= Hearst Castle =

Historical estate in San Simeon, California

Hearst Castle La Cuesta Encantada

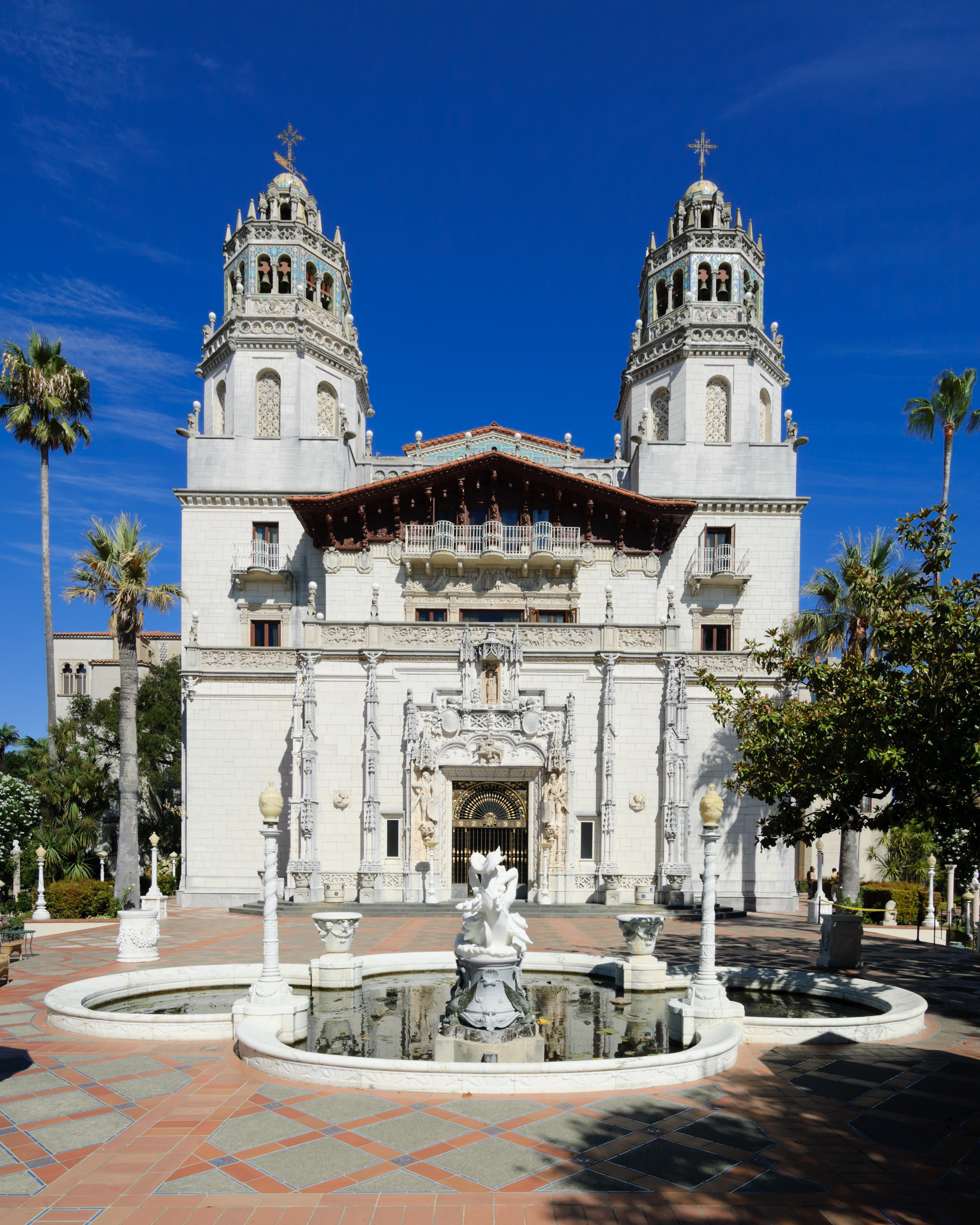
- Casa Grande, inspired by the Church of Santa María la Mayor, Ronda, Spain, forms the centerpiece of Hearst's estate.

General information
- Type: Mansion
- Architectural style: Spanish Colonial Revival, Mediterranean Revival, other late 19th and 20th century revival styles
- Location: Near San Simeon, California, United States
- Coordinates: 35°41′07″N 121°10′04″W
- Groundbreaking: 1919
- Completed: 1947

Technical details
- Floor area: More than 90,000 sq ft (8,400 m^{2})

Design and construction
- Architect: Julia Morgan

Website
- hearstcastle.org

U.S. National Register of Historic Places
- Designated: June 22, 1972
- Reference no.: 72000253

U.S. National Historic Landmark
- Designated: May 11, 1976

California Historical Landmark
- Designated: April 28, 1958
- Reference no.: 640

Hearst Castle, known formally as La Cuesta Encantada (Spanish for 'The Enchanted Hill'), is a historic estate in San Simeon, located on the Central Coast of California. Conceived by William Randolph Hearst, the publishing tycoon, and his architect Julia Morgan, the castle was built between 1919 and 1947. Today, Hearst Castle is a museum open to the public as a California State Park and registered as a National Historic Landmark and California Historical Landmark.

George Hearst, William Randolph Hearst's father, had purchased the original 40,000-acre (63 sq mi) estate in 1865 and Camp Hill, the site for the future Hearst Castle, was used for family camping vacations during Hearst's youth. Soon after the death of his mother, Phoebe Hearst, in 1919, William Randolph commissioned the architectural pioneer Julia Morgan to build "something a little more comfortable up on the hill", the genesis of the present castle. She worked in close collaboration with Hearst for over twenty years; the castle was under almost continual construction from 1920 until 1939, with work resuming after the end of World War II until Hearst's final departure in 1947.

Originally intended to be a family home for Hearst, his wife Millicent and their five sons, by 1925 Hearst's marriage was effectively over and San Simeon became the home of him and his mistress, the actress Marion Davies. Their guest list included many of the Hollywood stars of the Roaring Twenties; Charlie Chaplin, Cary Grant, the Marx Brothers, Greta Garbo, Buster Keaton, Mary Pickford, Jean Harlow and Clark Gable all visited, some on multiple occasions. Political luminaries encompassed Calvin Coolidge and Winston Churchill while other notables included Charles Lindbergh, P. G. Wodehouse and Bernard Shaw.

Shortly after starting San Simeon, Hearst—who had a passion for collecting so strong he was dubbed the "Great Accumulator"—began to conceive of making the castle "a museum of the best things that I can secure". Foremost among his purchases were architectural elements from Western Europe, particularly Spain; over thirty ceilings, doorcases, fireplaces and mantels, entire monasteries, paneling and a medieval tithe barn were purchased, shipped to Hearst's Brooklyn warehouses and transported on to California. Much was then incorporated into the fabric of Hearst Castle. In addition, he built up collections of more conventional art and antiques of high quality; his assemblage of ancient Greek vases was one of the world's largest. The castle and Hearst's lifestyle was satirized by Orson Welles in his 1941 film Citizen Kane, which Hearst sought to suppress.

In May 1947, Hearst's health compelled him and Marion Davies to leave the castle for the last time. He died in Los Angeles in 1951. Morgan died in 1957. The following year, the Hearst family gave the castle and many of its contents to the State of California and the mansion was opened to the public in June 1958. It has since operated as the Hearst San Simeon State Historical Monument and attracts about 750,000 visitors annually. The Hearst family retains ownership of the majority of the wider estate of 82,000 acres (128 sq mi) and, under a land conservation agreement reached in 2005, has worked with the California State Parks Department and American Land Conservancy to preserve the undeveloped character of the area; the setting for the castle which Bernard Shaw is said to have described as "what God would have built if he had had the money".

== History ==
=== Early history: to 1864 ===
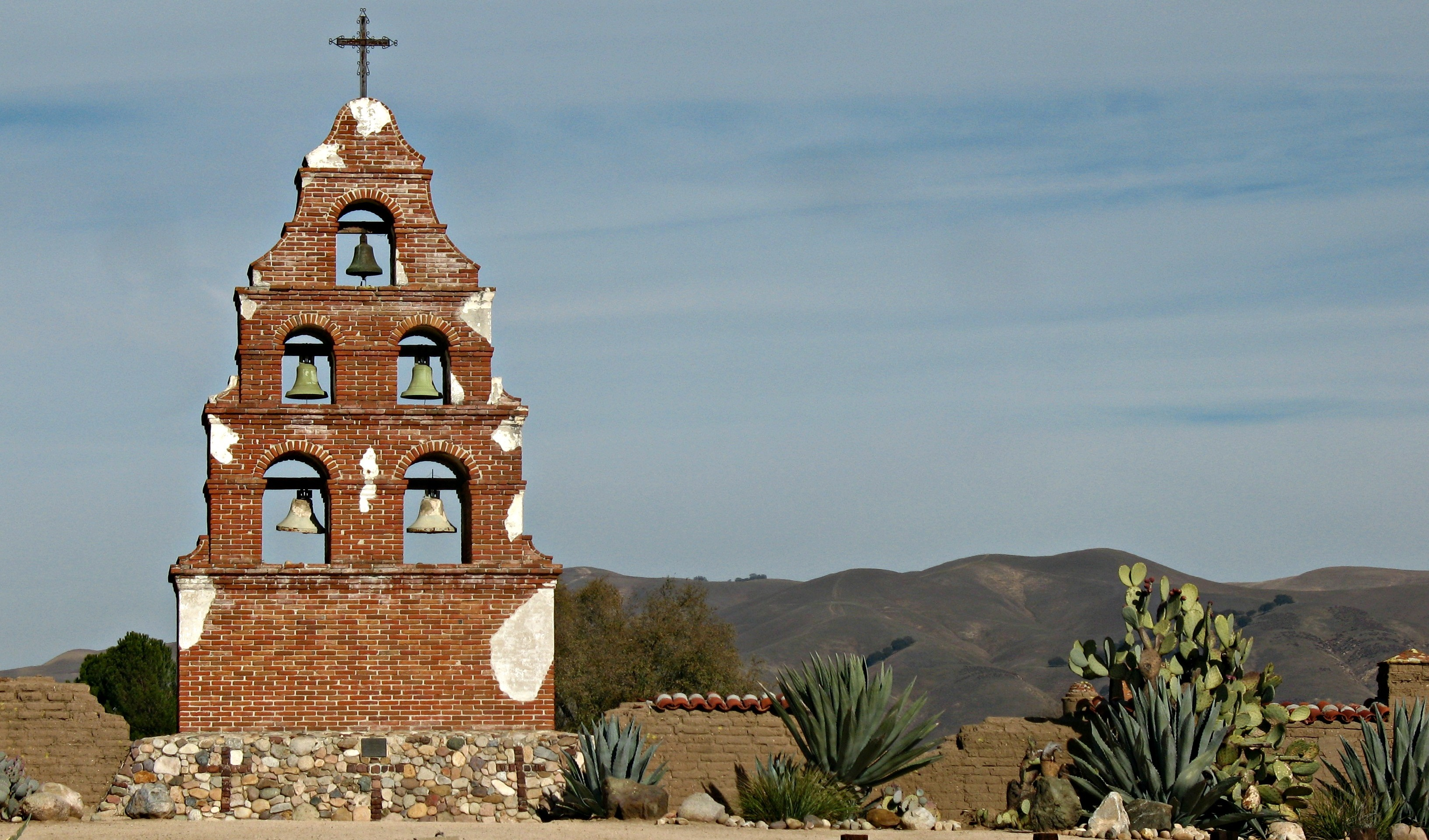
The bell tower of the restored Mission San Miguel Arcángel

The coastal range of Southern California has been occupied since prehistoric times. The indigenous inhabitants were the Salinans and the Chumash. In the late 18th century, Spanish missions were established in the area to convert the Native American population. Mission San Miguel Arcángel, one of the largest, opened in what is now San Luis Obispo county in 1797. By the 1840s, the mission had declined and the priests departed. In that decade, the governors of Mexican California distributed the mission lands in a series of grants. Three of these were Rancho Piedra Blanca, Rancho Santa Rosa and Rancho San Simeon. The Mexican–American War of 1846–1848 saw the area pass into the control of the United States under the terms of the Mexican Cession. The California gold rush of the next decade brought an influx of American settlers, among whom was the 30-year old George Hearst.

=== Buying the land: 1865–1919 ===
Born in Missouri in 1820, Hearst made his fortune as a miner, notably at the Comstock Lode and the Homestake Mine. He then undertook a political career, becoming a senator in 1886, and purchasing The San Francisco Examiner. Investing in land, he bought the Piedra Blanca property in 1865 and subsequently extended his holdings with the acquisition of most of the Santa Rosa estate, and much of the San Simeon lands. In the 1870s George Hearst built a ranch house on the estate, which remains a private property maintained by the Hearst Corporation, and the San Simeon area became a site for family camping expeditions, including his young son, William. A particularly favored spot was named Camp Hill, the site of the future Hearst Castle. Years later Hearst recalled his early memories of the place. "My father brought me to San Simeon as a boy. I had to come up the slope hanging on to the tail of a pony. We lived in a cabin on this spot and I could see forever. That's the West – forever." George Hearst developed the estate somewhat, introducing beef and dairy cattle, planting extensive fruit orchards, and expanding the wharf facilities at San Simeon Bay. He also bred racehorses. While his father developed the ranch, Hearst and his mother traveled, including an eighteen-month tour of Europe in 1873, where Hearst's lifelong obsession with art collecting began.

At George Hearst's death in 1891, he left an estate of $18 million to his widow including the California ranch. Phoebe Hearst shared the cultural and artistic interests of her son, collecting art and patronizing architects. She was also a considerable philanthropist, founding schools and libraries, supporting the fledgling University of California, Berkeley, including the funding of the Hearst Mining Building in memory of her husband, and making major donations to a range of women's organizations, including the YWCA. During this period, probably in the late 1890s, Mrs Hearst encountered Julia Morgan, a young civil engineering student at Berkeley. On Phoebe Hearst's own death in 1919, Hearst inherited the ranch, which had grown to 250,000 acres (1,012 km^{2}) and 14 mi (23 km) of coastline, as well as $11 million. Within days, he was at Morgan's San Francisco office. (Note: Mary Levkoff suggests that the initial discussion regarding San Simeon took place just before Phoebe Hearst's death, in late March or early April 1919.)

=== Morgan and Hearst: "a true collaboration" ===
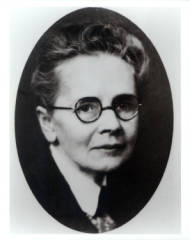
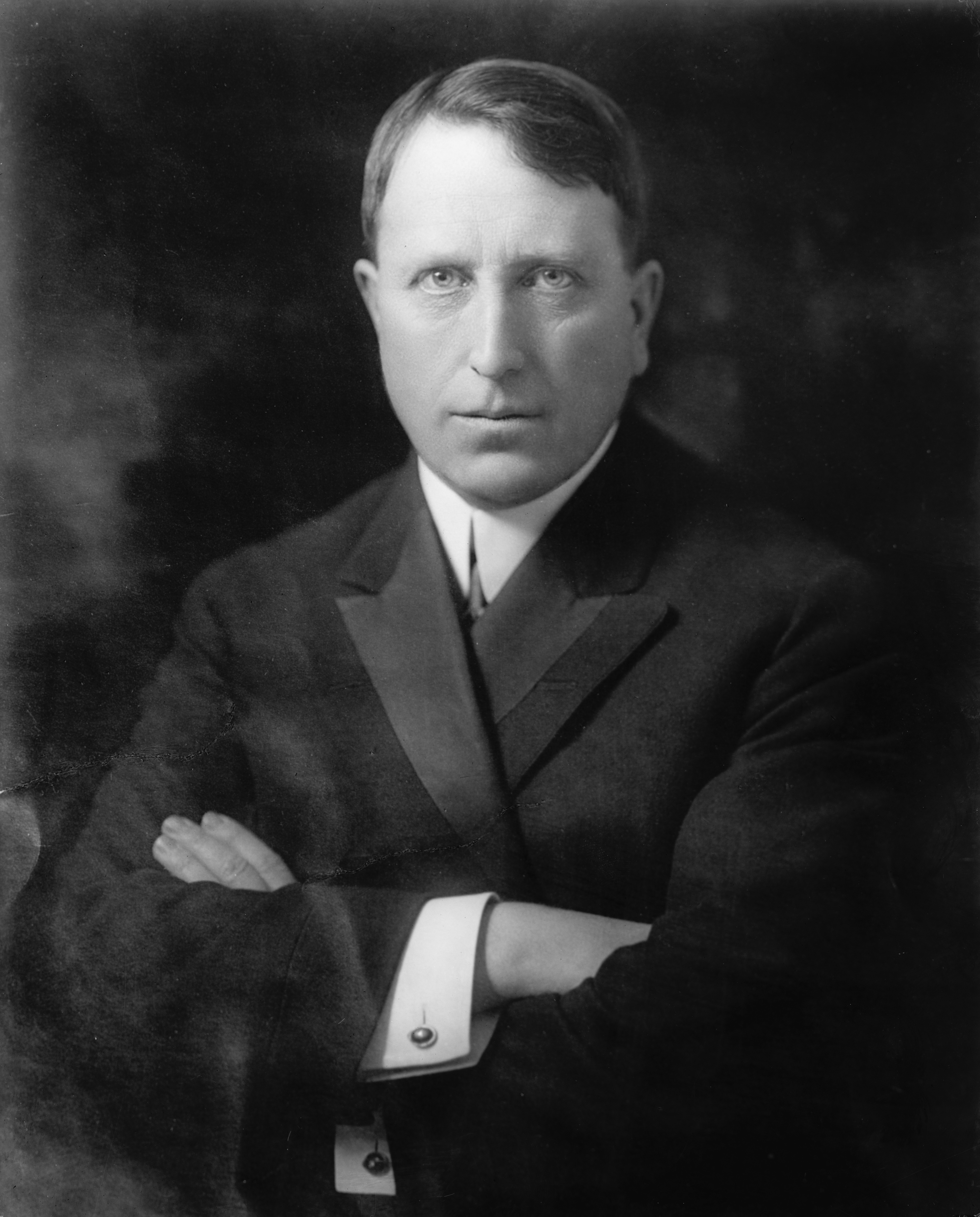
"A true collaboration". Left: Julia Morgan in about 1926. Right: Hearst around 1910.

Julia Morgan, born in 1872, was forty-seven when Hearst entered her office in 1919. Her biographer Mark A. Wilson has described her subsequent career as that of "America's first independent full-time woman architect". After studying at Berkeley, where she worked with Bernard Maybeck, in 1898 she became the first woman to win entry to the prestigious École des Beaux-Arts in Paris. Passing out from the École in 1902, Morgan returned to San Francisco and took up a post at the architectural practice of John Galen Howard. Howard recognized Morgan's talents, but also exploited them – "... the best thing about this person is, I pay her almost nothing, as it is a woman" – and in 1904, she passed the California architects' licensing examination, the first woman to do so, establishing her own office at 456 Montgomery Street in 1906. During her time with Howard, Morgan was commissioned by Phoebe Hearst to undertake work at her Hacienda del Pozo de Verona estate at Pleasanton. This led to work at Wyntoon and to a number of commissions from Hearst himself; an unexecuted design for a mansion at Sausalito, north of San Francisco, a cottage at the Grand Canyon, the Los Angeles Examiner Building and the Hearst Castle estate. (Note: Mark Alan Hewitt, in his study, The Architect & the American Country House: 1890-1940, estimates that Morgan designed some seven hundred buildings over the course of her career.)

In 1919, when he turned up at Morgan's office, Hearst was fifty-six years old and the owner of a publishing empire that included twenty-eight newspapers, thirteen magazines, eight radio stations, four film studios, extensive real-estate holdings and thirty-one thousand employees. He was also a significant public figure: although his political endeavors had proved largely unsuccessful, the influence he exerted through his very direct control of his media empire attracted fame and opprobrium in equal measure. In 1917, one biographer described him as "the most hated man in the country". The actor Ralph Bellamy, a guest at San Simeon in the mid-1930s, recorded Hearst's working methods in a description of a party in the assembly room: "the party was quite gay. And in the midst of it, Mr Hearst came in. There was a (teletype machine) just inside and he stopped and he read it. He went to a table and picked up a phone. He asked for the editor of (his) San Francisco newspaper and he said, 'Put this in a two-column box of the front pages of all the newspapers tomorrow morning.' And without notes he dictated an editorial".

Morgan and Hearst's partnership at San Simeon lasted from 1919, until his final departure from the castle in 1947. Their correspondence, preserved in the Julia Morgan archive in the Robert E. Kennedy Library at Cal Poly San Luis Obispo, runs to some 3,700 letters and telegrams. (Note: From 2019 the Kennedy Library has been undertaking digitalization of the Morgan/Hearst correspondence with the results to be made available online.) Victoria Kastner, Hearst Castle's in-house custodian, has described the partnership as "a rare, true collaboration" and there are many contemporary accounts of the closeness of the relationship. Walter Steilberg, a draughtsman in Morgan's office, once observed them at dinner; "The rest of us could have been a hundred miles away; they didn't pay any attention to anybody ... these two very different people just clicked". Thomas Aidala, in his 1984 history of the castle, made a similar observation: "seated opposite each other, they would discuss and review work, consider design changes, pass drawings back and forth ... seemingly oblivious of the rest of the guests".

=== Having a ball: 1925–1938 ===
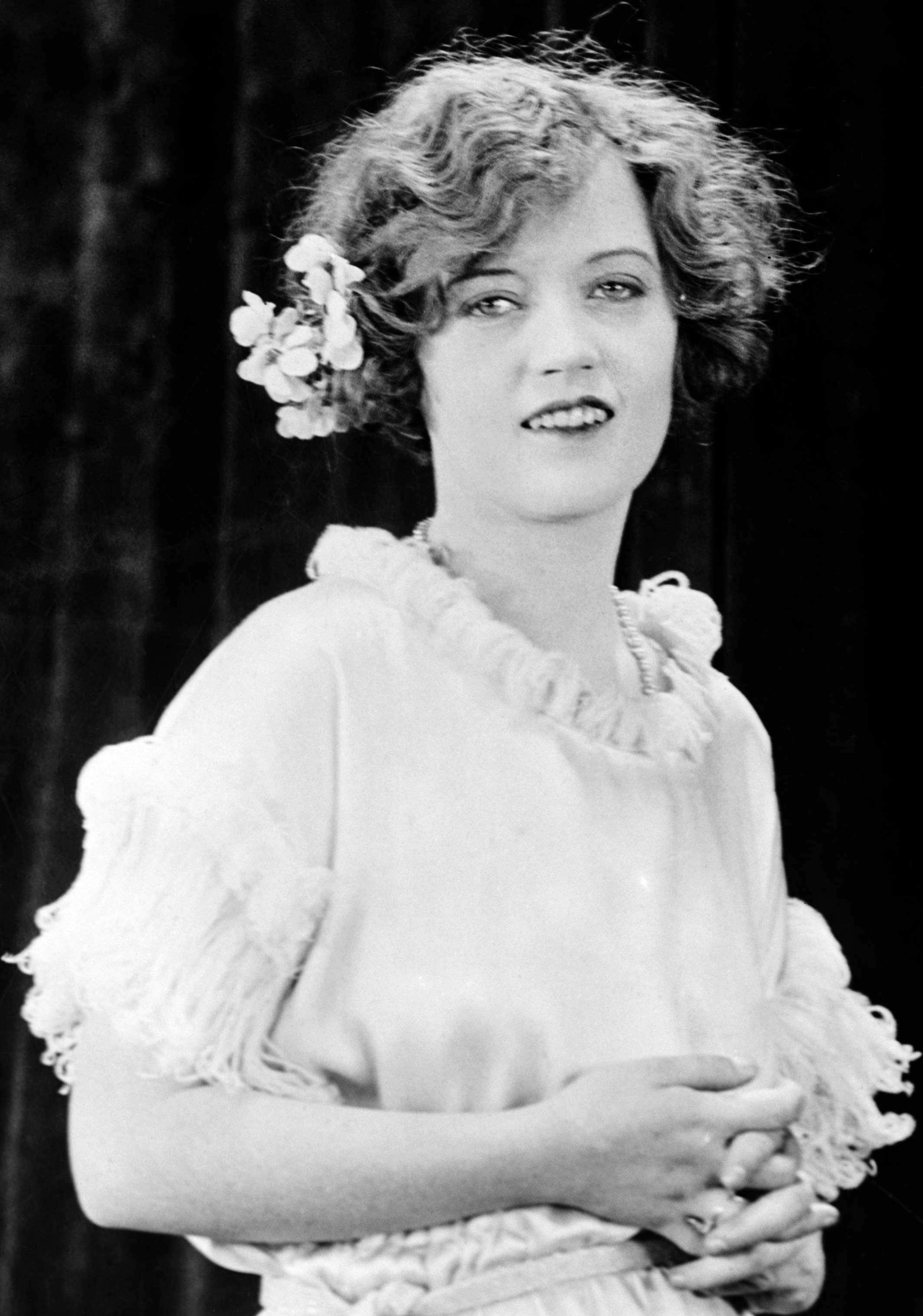
Marion Davies – Hearst's lover since 1918, and chatelaine of Hearst Castle

Hearst and his family occupied Casa Grande for the first time at Christmas, 1925. Thereafter, Hearst's wife, Millicent, went back to New York, and from 1926 until they left for the last time in 1947, Hearst's mistress Marion Davies acted as his chatelaine at the castle. The Hollywood and political elite often visited in the 1920s and 1930s. Among Hearst's guests were Calvin Coolidge, Winston Churchill, Charlie Chaplin, Cary Grant, the Marx Brothers, Charles Lindbergh, Jean Harlow and Clark Gable. Churchill described his host, and Millicent Hearst and Davies, in a letter to his own wife; "a grave simple child – with no doubt a nasty temper – playing with the most costly toys ... two magnificent establishments, two charming wives, complete indifference to public opinion, oriental hospitalities". In another letter to Clementine, Churchill dismissed criticism of San Simeon; "his house is rudely described as Monte Carlo Casino on top of the Rock of Gibraltar - but it is better than this." (Note: During his visit to San Simeon in September 1929, Churchill encountered William Van Antwerp, an anglophile stockbroker and book collector. Sensing an opportunity, Churchill immediately opened an account with Van Antwerp's brokerage. His timing was unfortunate: within a month, the Wall Street Crash saw his American losses exceed $75,000.) Weekend guests were either brought by private train from Glendale Station north of Los Angeles, and then by car to the castle, or flew into Hearst's airstrip, generally arriving late on Friday evening or on Saturday. Cecil Beaton wrote of his impressions during his first visit for New Year's Eve in 1931: "we caught sight of a vast, sparkling white castle in Spain. It was out of a fairy story. The sun poured down with theatrical brilliance on tons of white marble and white stone. There seemed to be a thousand statues, pedestals, urns. The flowers were unreal in their ordered profusion. Hearst stood smiling at the top of one of the many flights of garden steps".

Guests were generally left to their own devices during the day. Horse-riding, shooting, swimming, golf, croquet and tennis were all available, while Hearst would lead mounted parties for picnics on the estate. The only absolute deadline was for cocktails in the assembly room at 7.30 on Saturday night. Alcohol was rationed; guests were not permitted to have liquor in their rooms, and were limited to one cocktail each before dinner. This was due not to meanness on Hearst's part but to his concerns over Davies's alcoholism, though the rule was frequently flouted. (Note: The limitation of the serving of alcohol at the castle irritated some guests. Eddie Sutherland, the film director and husband of Louise Brooks, left after three days, "I'll be dammed if I'll be rousted out of the hay by a cowbell at eight o'clock every morning for breakfast, and have my liquor rationed as if I was some silly schoolboy".) The actor David Niven later reflected on his supplying illicit alcohol to Davies; "It seemed fun at the time to stoke up her fire of outrageous fun and I got a kick out of feeling I had outwitted one of the most powerful and best informed men on earth, but what a disloyal and crummy betrayal of (him) and what a nasty potential nail to put in her coffin". Dinner was served at 9.00 in the refectory. Wine came from Hearst's 7,000-bottle cellar. Charlie Chaplin commented on the fare; "dinners were elaborate, pheasant, wild duck, partridge and venison" but also the informality, "amidst the opulence, we were served paper napkins, it was only when Mrs. Hearst was in residence that the guests were given linen ones". The informality extended to the ketchup bottles and condiments in jars which were remarked on by many guests. (Note: Ken Murray, in his history, The Golden Days of San Simeon, reproduces the menu card for 4 July 1946, the last full year of Hearst's residence at the castle. Listing the times for meals as "Breakfast 9:00 to 12:00, Luncheon 2:00 (and) Dinner 9:00", for the evening meal guests were to be served: "Fried olympic oysters, roast partridge, gravy, bread sauce, artichokes hollandaise, cake and cherry ice cream". The card also records the evening movie, The Perfect Marriage with David Niven and Loretta Young, showing at the castle some seven months before its official release.) Dinner was invariably followed by a movie; initially outside, and then in the theater. The actress Ilka Chase recorded a showing in the early 1930s; "the theater was not yet complete – the plaster was still wet – so an immense pile of fur coats was heaped at the door and each guest picked one up and enveloped himself before entering...Hearst and Marion, close together in the gloom and bundled in their fur coats, looked for all the world like the big and baby bears". Movies were generally films from Hearst's own studio, Cosmopolitan Productions, and often featured Marion Davies. Sherman Eubanks, whose father worked as an electrician at the castle, recorded in an oral history: "Mr Hearst would push a button and call up to the projectionist and say 'Put on Marion's Peg o' My Heart'. So I've seen Peg o' My Heart about fifty times. This is not being critical. I'm simply saying that's the way it was". Chase noted that this repetition tended to "put a slight strain on the guests' gratitude".

In 1937, Patricia Van Cleeve married at the castle, the grandest social occasion there since the visit of President and Mrs Coolidge in February 1930. Ken Murray records these two events as the only occasions when formal attire was required of guests to the castle. Van Cleeve, who married the actor, Arthur Lake, was always introduced as Marion Davies' favorite niece. It was frequently rumored that she was in fact Davies and Hearst's daughter, something she herself acknowledged just before her death in 1993. In February 1938, a plane crash at the San Simeon airstrip led to the deaths of Lord and Lady Plunket, who were traveling to the castle as Hearst's guests, and the pilot Tex Phillips. The only other passenger, the bobsledding champion, James Lawrence, survived.

=== The specter at the feast: Hearst, Welles and Xanadu ===
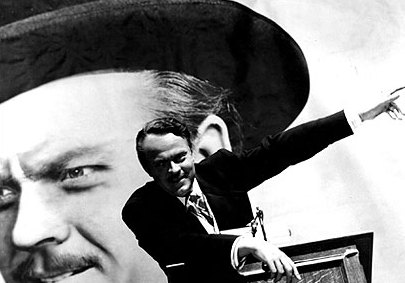
A publicity shot for Citizen Kane

Hearst Castle was the inspiration for Xanadu, and Hearst himself the main model for Charles Foster Kane in Orson Welles's 1941 film Citizen Kane. Having made his name with the Mercury Theatre production of The War of the Worlds in 1938, Welles arrived in Hollywood in 1939 to make a film version of Joseph Conrad's novel, Heart of Darkness for RKO Pictures. That film was not made and Welles began a collaboration with the screenwriter Herman J. Mankiewicz on a screenplay originally entitled American. The film tells the stories of Kane, a media magnate and aspiring politician, and of his second wife Susan Alexander, a failed opera singer driven to drink, (Note: Kastner suggests that Welles's portrayal of Susan Foster Kane, modelled on Davies, as a "pitiful drunkard" was the element of the film that most angered Hearst.) who inhabit a castle in Florida, filled with "paintings, pictures, statues, the very stones of many another palace – a collection of everything so big it can never be cataloged or appraised; enough for ten museums; the loot of the world". Filming began in June 1940 and the movie premiered on 1 June 1941. Although at the time Welles, and RKO, denied that the film was based on Hearst, his long-time friend and collaborator, John Houseman was clear, "the truth is simple: for the basic concept of Charles Foster Kane and for the main lines and significant events of his public life, Mankiewicz used as his model the figure of William Randolph Hearst". Told of the film's content before its release – his friends, the gossip columnists Hedda Hopper and Louella Parsons having attended early screenings – Hearst made strenuous efforts to stop the premiere. When these failed, he sought to damage the film's circulation by alternately forbidding all mention of it in his media outlets, or by using them to attack both the movie and Welles. Hearst's assault damaged the film at the box office, and harmed Welles' subsequent career. Since its inception in 1952 through to 2012, the Sight and Sound Critics' Poll voted Citizen Kane the greatest film of all time in every decade of polling. (Note: In 2012 it was beaten by Alfred Hitchcock's Vertigo.) (Note: Orson Welles' ashes were interred on a farm outside Ronda belonging to his longtime friend, the matador Antonio Ordóñez) On 9 March 2012, the film was screened in the movie theater at Hearst Castle for the first time as part of the San Luis Obispo International Film Festival.

=== Depression, death and after: 1939–present ===
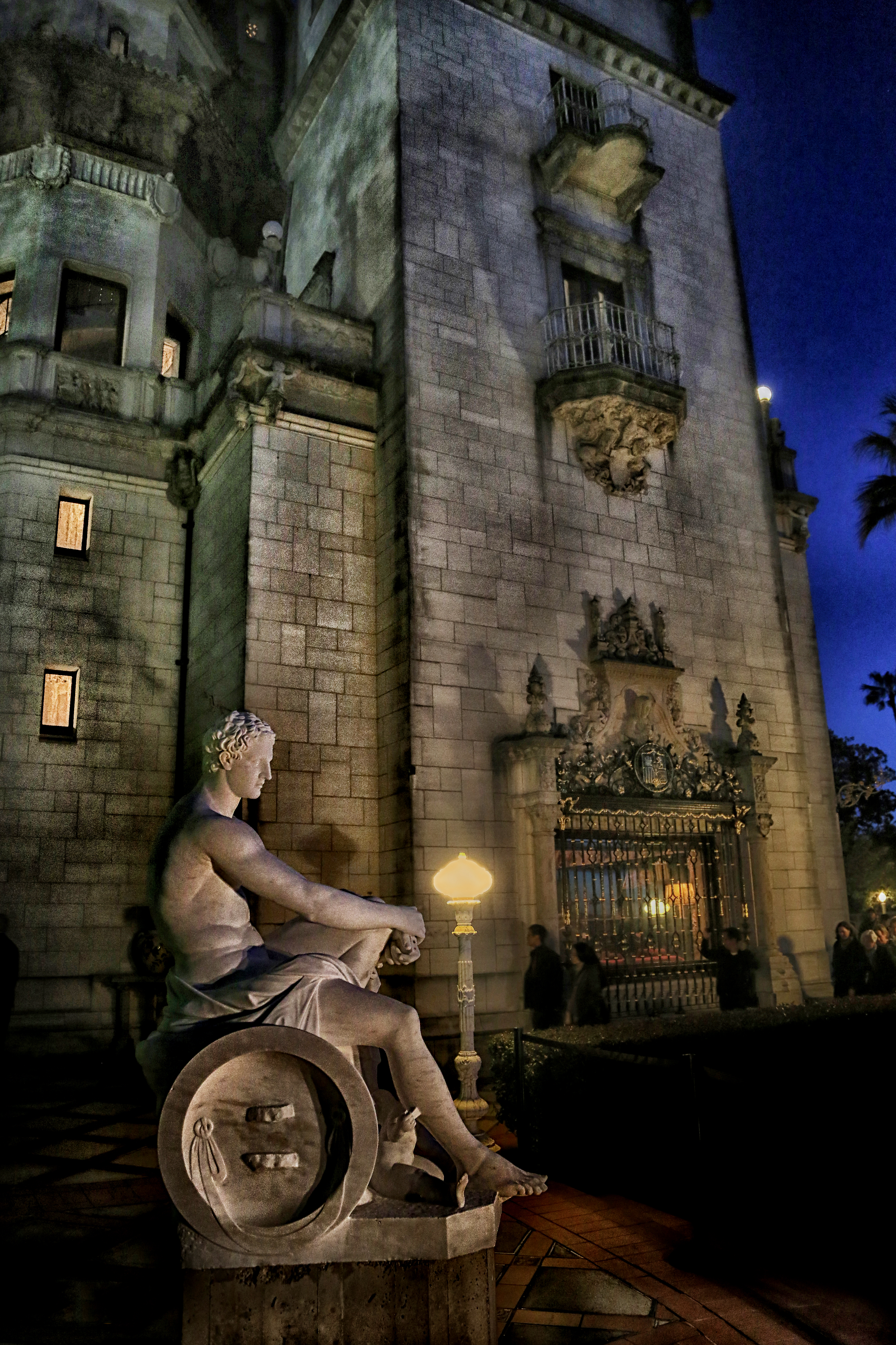
Casa Grande at night

By the late 1930s the Great Depression and Hearst's profligacy had brought him to the brink of financial ruin. Debts totaled $126 million. (Note: Victoria Kastner suggests the lower, but still enormous, figure of $87 million.) He was compelled to cede financial control of the Hearst Corporation, newspapers and radio stations were sold, and much of his art collection was dispersed in a series of sales, often for considerably less than he had paid. Hearst railed against his losses, and the perceived incompetence of the sales agents, Parish-Watson & Co.: "they greatly cheapened them and us, (he) advertises like a bargain basement sale. I am heartbroken". Construction at Hearst Castle virtually ceased. After Pearl Harbor the castle was closed up and Hearst and Davies moved to Wyntoon which was perceived to be less vulnerable to enemy attack. They returned in 1945 and construction on a limited scale recommenced, finally ending in 1947. In early May of that year, with his health declining, Hearst and Davies left the castle for the last time. The pair settled in at 1007 North Beverly Drive in Beverly Hills. Hearst died in 1951, (Note: The pallbearers for Hearst's coffin included Herbert Hoover, Earl Warren, Douglas MacArthur, Bernard Baruch and Louis B. Mayer.) his death abruptly severing him from Davies, who was excluded from the funeral by Hearst's family – "For thirty-two years I had him, and they leave me with his empty room". In 1950 Julia Morgan closed her San Francisco office after a career of forty-two years. Ill health circumscribed her retirement and she died, a virtual recluse, in early 1957.

In 1958 the Hearst Corporation donated Hearst Castle, its gardens, and many of its contents, to the state of California. A dedicatory plaque at the castle reads: "La Cuesta Encantada presented to the State of California in 1958 by the Hearst Corporation in memory of William Randolph Hearst who created this Enchanted Hill, and of his mother, Phoebe Apperson Hearst, who inspired it". The castle was opened to the public for the first time in June 1958. Hearst Castle was added to the National Register of Historic Places on June 22, 1972, and became a United States National Historic Landmark on May 11, 1976. Hearst was always keen to protect the mystique of his castle. In 1926, he wrote to Morgan to congratulate her after a successful party was held on the hill: "those wild movie people said it was wonderful and that the most extravagant dream of a movie picture fell far short of this reality. They all wanted to make a picture there but they are NOT going to be allowed to do this...". Commercial filming at the castle is still rarely allowed; since 1957 only two projects have been granted permission. Stanley Kubrick's 1960 film Spartacus used the castle to stand in as Crassus' villa, and in 2014, Lady Gaga's music video for "G.U.Y." was filmed at the Neptune and Roman Pools.

On February 12, 1976, the Casa del Sol guesthouse was damaged by a bomb. The device was placed by allies of the Symbionese Liberation Army (SLA), in retaliation for Patty Hearst, Hearst's granddaughter, testifying in court at her trial for armed robbery, following her kidnapping by the SLA in 1974. On December 22, 2003, an earthquake occurred with its epicenter some three miles north of the castle. With a magnitude of 6.5, it was the largest earthquake recorded at San Simeon - the very limited structural damage which resulted was a testament to the quality of the castle's construction. Since its opening, the castle has become a major California tourist attraction, attracting over 850,000 visitors in 2018. Changes to the tour arrangements in 2019 allowed visitors time to explore the grounds independently, at the conclusion of the conducted tours. The Hearst family maintains a connection with the castle, which was closed for a day in early August 2019 for the wedding of Amanda Hearst, Hearst's great-granddaughter.

The castle closed in March 2020 due to the COVID-19 pandemic. Many projects and repairs that would have been impossible to undertake with the castle open to tourists were completed during the closure. The castle reopened on May 11, 2022.

== Architecture ==
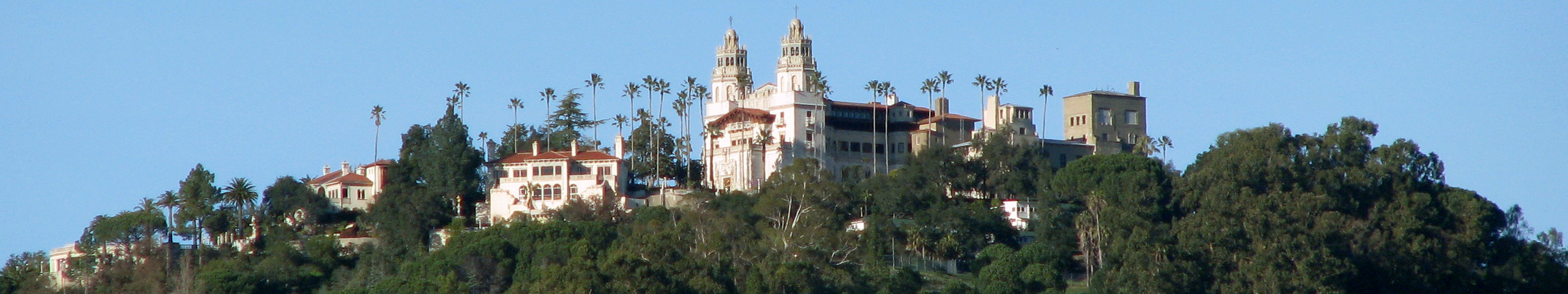
A view of Hearst Castle from the southwest

=== Design ===
Hearst first approached Morgan with ideas for a new project in April 1919, shortly after the death of his mother had brought him into his inheritance. His original idea was to build a bungalow, according to Walter Steilberg, one of Morgan's draftsmen who recalled Hearst's words from the initial meeting: "I would like to build something up on the hill at San Simeon. I get tired of going up there and camping in tents. I'm getting a little too old for that. I'd like to get something that would be a little more comfortable".

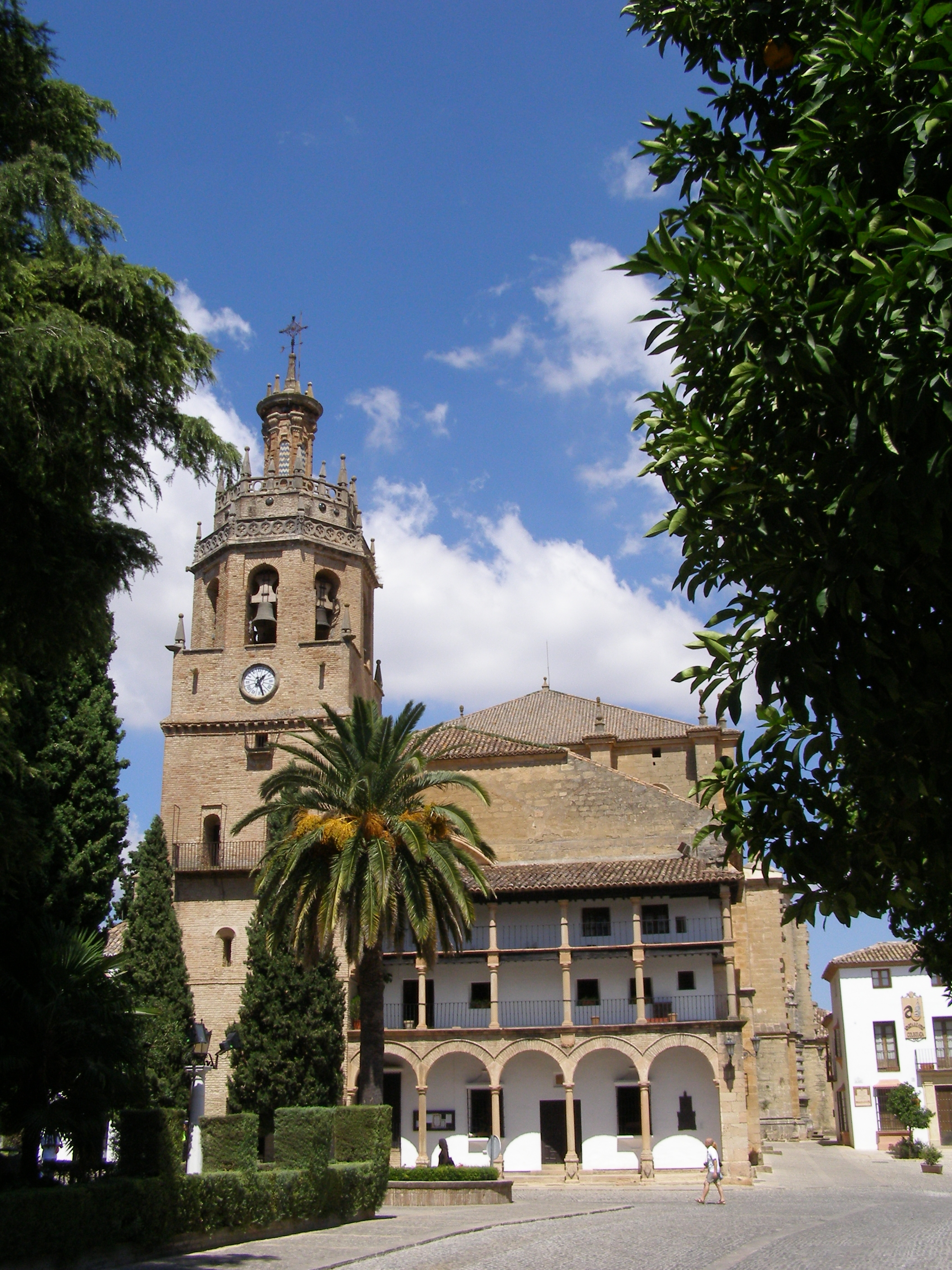
The Church of Santa María la Mayor, Ronda – Hearst's main inspiration

Within a month, Hearst's original ideas for a modest dwelling had greatly expanded. Discussion on the style began with consideration of "Jappo-Swisso" themes. Then the Spanish Colonial Revival style was favored. Morgan had used this style when she worked on Hearst's Los Angeles Herald Examiner headquarters in 1915. (Note: In his study, The Spanish Style House, which is jointly dedicated to Julia Morgan and Paul Revere Williams, Ruben G. Mendoza suggests that Morgan's most successful designs drew on the Mission and Moorish, as well as the Spanish Colonial Revival styles.) Hearst appreciated the Spanish Revival but was dissatisfied with the crudeness of the colonial structures in California. Mexican colonial architecture had more sophistication, but he objected to its abundance of ornamentation. Thomas Aidala, in his 1984 study of the castle, notes the Churrigueresque influence on the design of the main block, "flat and unembellished exterior surfaces; decorative urges are particularized and isolated, focused mainly on doorways, windows (and) towers". The 1915 Panama–California Exposition in San Diego held the closest approximations in California to the approach Hearst desired. But his European tours, and specifically the inspiration of the Iberian Peninsula, led him to Renaissance and Baroque examples in southern Spain that more exactly suited his tastes. (Note: In their study Courtyard Housing in Los Angeles, Polyzoides, Sherwood and Tice trace the influence of Spanish, and particularly Andalusian, architectural styles in California back to Washington Irving's Tales of the Alhambra, published in 1832.) He particularly admired a church in Ronda, Spain and asked Morgan to model the Casa Grande towers after it. In a letter to Morgan dated December 31, 1919, Hearst wrote, "The San Diego Exposition is the best source of Spanish in California. The alternative is to build in the Renaissance style of southern Spain. We picked out the towers of the church at Ronda... a Renaissance decoration, particularly that of the very southern part of Spain, could harmonize well with them. I would very much like to have your views on... what style of architecture we should select." This blend of Southern Spanish Renaissance, Revival and Mediterranean examples became San Simeon's defining style; "something a little different than other people are doing out in California". The architectural writers Arrol Gellner and Douglas Keister describe Casa Grande as "a palatial fusion of Classicism and Mediterranean architecture... [that] transcended the Mission Revival era and instead belonged to the more archaeological Period Revival styles that gained favor after the Panama–California Exposition of 1915".

Hearst Castle has a total of 42 bedrooms, 61 bathrooms, 19 sitting rooms, 127 acres (0.5 km^{2}) of gardens, indoor and outdoor swimming pools, tennis courts, a movie theater, an airfield and, during Hearst's lifetime, the world's largest private zoo. Hearst was an inveterate rethinker who would frequently order the redesign of previously agreed, and often built, structures: the Neptune Pool was rebuilt three times before he was satisfied. He was aware of his propensity for changing his mind; in a letter dated 18 March 1920, he wrote to Morgan; "All little houses stunning. Please complete before I can think up any more changes". As a consequence of Hearst's persistent design changes, and financial difficulties in the early and later 1930s, the complex was never finished. By late summer 1919, Morgan had surveyed the site, analyzed its geology, and drawn initial plans for Casa Grande. Construction began in 1919 and continued through 1947 when Hearst left the estate for the last time. During the early years of construction, until Hearst's stays at San Simeon became longer and more frequent, his approval for the ongoing design was obtained by Morgan sending him models of planned developments. By the late 1920s the main model, designed by another female architect Julian C. Mesic, had become too large to ship and Mesic and Morgan would photograph it, hand color the images, and send these to Hearst.

=== Construction ===
The castle's location presented major challenges for construction. It was remote; when Morgan began coming to the estate for site visits in 1919, she would leave her San Francisco office on Friday afternoon and take an eight-hour, 200-mile (320 km) train journey to San Luis Obispo, followed by a fifty-mile (80 km) drive to San Simeon. (Note: Between 1919 and 1939 Morgan made the journey a total of 558 times.) The relative isolation made recruiting and retaining a workforce a constant difficulty. In the early years, the estate lacked water, its limited supplies coming from three natural springs on Pine Mountain, a 3,500 ft-high (1,100 m) peak seven miles (11 km) east of Hearst Castle. The issue was addressed by the construction of three reservoirs and Morgan devised a gravity-based water delivery system that transported water from the nearby mountain springs to the reservoirs, including the main one on Rocky Butte, a 2,000 ft (610 m) knoll less than a mile southeast from Hearst Castle. Water was of particular importance; as well as feeding the pools and fountains Hearst desired, it provided electricity, by way of a private hydroelectric plant, until the San Joaquin Light and Power Corporation began service to the castle in 1924. The climate presented a further challenge. The proximity to the coast brought strong winds in from the Pacific Ocean and the site's elevation meant that winter storms were frequent and severe.

We are all leaving the hill. We are drowned, blown and frozen out … Before we build anything more let's make what we have practical, comfortable and beautiful. If we can't do that we might just as well change the names of the houses to Pneumonia House, Diphtheria House and Influenza Bungalow. The main house we can call the Clinic.

— Hearst's letter of February 1927 after a visit during a period of severe storms

Water was also essential for the production of concrete, the main structural component of the houses and their ancillary buildings. Morgan had substantial experience of building in steel-reinforced concrete and, together with the firm of consulting engineers Earl and Wright, experimented in finding suitable stone, eventually settling on that quarried from the mountain top on which the foundation platform for the castle was built. Combining this with desalinated sand from San Simeon Bay produced concrete of exceptionally high quality. Later, white sand was brought in from Carmel. Material for construction was transported either by train and truck, or by sea into a wharf built in San Simeon Bay below the site. In time, a light railway was constructed from the wharf to the castle, and Morgan built a compound of warehouses for storage and accommodation for workers by the bay. Brick and tile works were also developed on site as brick was used extensively and tiling was an important element of the decoration of the castle. Morgan used several tile companies to produce her designs including Grueby Faience, Batchelder, California Faience and Solon & Schemmel. Albert Solon and Frank Schemmel came to Hearst Castle to undertake tiling work and Solon's brother, Camille, was responsible for the design of the mosaics of blue-and-gold Venetian glass tile used in the Roman pool and the murals in Hearst's Gothic library.

Morgan worked with a series of construction managers; Henry Washburn from 1919 to 1922, then Camille Rossi from 1922, until his firing by Hearst in 1932, (Note: Rossi, whose involvement in both the construction and the design of the complex was considerable, had an abrasive personality and by 1932 had exhausted the patience of both Hearst and Morgan.) and finally George Loorz until 1940. From 1920 to 1939, there were between 25 and 150 workmen employed in construction at the castle.

=== Costs ===
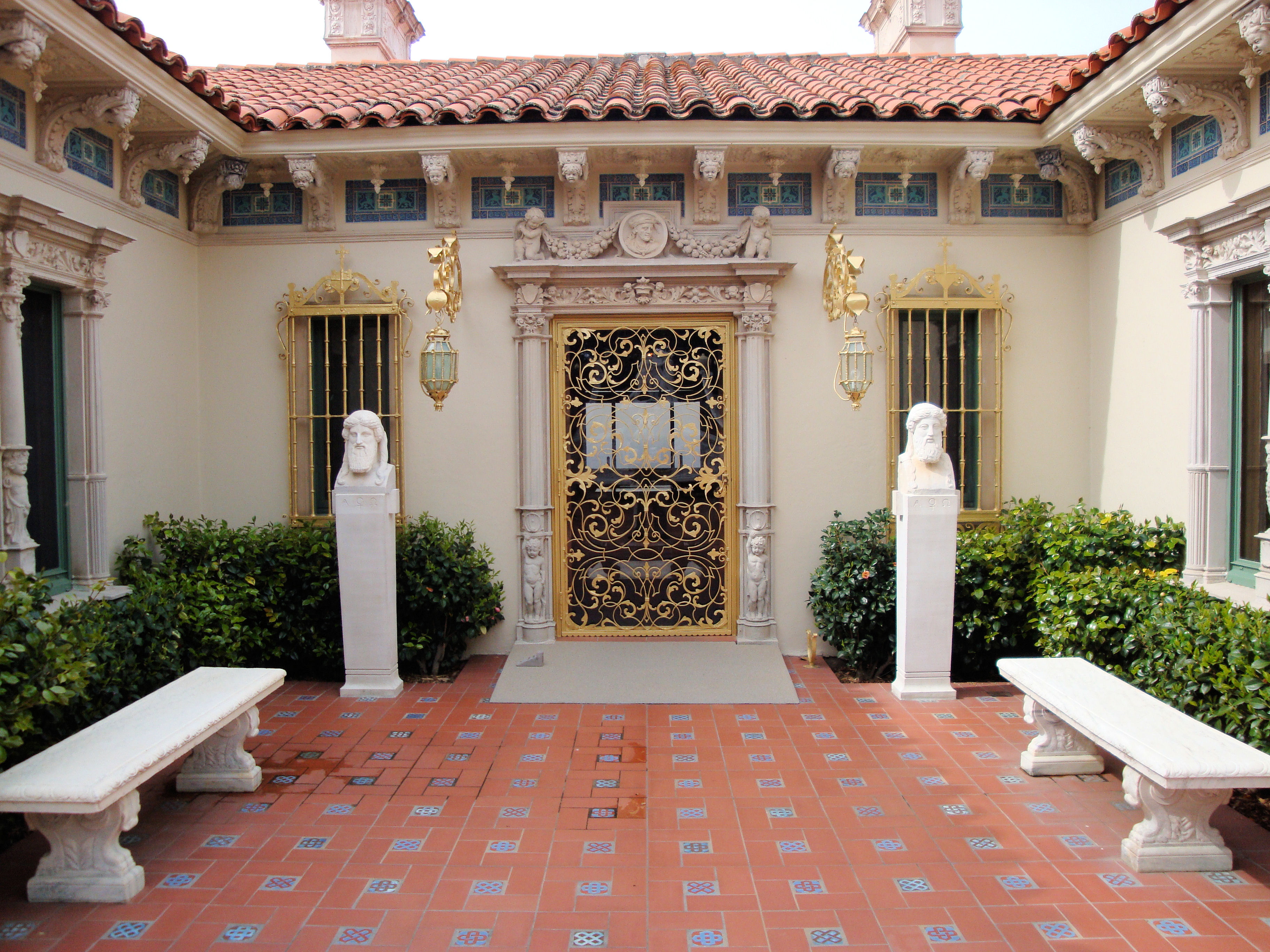
The front courtyard of Casa del Mar

The exact cost of the entire San Simeon complex is unknown. Kastner makes an estimate of expenditure on construction and furnishing the complex between 1919 and 1947 as "under $10,000,000". Thomas Aidala suggests a slightly more precise figure for the overall cost at between $7.2 and $8.2 million. Hearst's relaxed approach to using the funds of his companies, and sometimes the companies themselves, to make personal purchases made clear accounting for expenditure almost impossible. (Note: As an example, St Donat's Castle was purchased not by Hearst but by his National Magazine Company.) In 1927 one of his lawyers wrote, "the entire history of your corporation shows an informal method of withdrawal of funds". In 1945, when the Hearst Corporation was closing the Hearst Castle account for the final time, Morgan gave a breakdown of construction costs, which did not include expenditure on antiques and furnishings. Casa Grande's build cost is given as $2,987,000 and that for the guest houses, $500,000. Other works, including nearly half a million dollars on the Neptune pool, brought the total to $4,717,000. Morgan's fees for twenty-odd years of almost continuous work, came to $70,755. Her initial fee was a 6% commission on total costs. This was later increased to 8.5%. Many additional expenses, and challenges in getting prompt payment, led her to receive rather less than this. Kastner suggests that Morgan made an overall profit of $100,000 on the entire, twenty-year, project. Her modest remuneration was unimportant to her. At the height of Hearst's financial travails in the late 1930s, when his debts stood at over $87 million, Morgan wrote to him, "I wish you would use me in any way that relieves your mind as to the care of your belongings. There never has been nor will there be, any charge in this connection, [it is] an honor and a pleasure".

=== Plan of the castle complex ===
Hearst Castle estate

=== Casa del Mar ===
Casa del Mar, the largest of the three guest houses, provided accommodation for Hearst himself until Casa Grande was ready in 1925. He stayed in the house again in 1947, during his last visit to the ranch. Casa del Mar contains 5,350 square feet (497 square metres) of floor space. Although luxuriously designed and furnished, none of the guest houses had kitchen facilities, an omission that sometimes irritated Hearst's guests. Adela Rogers St. Johns recounted her first visit: "I rang and asked the maid for coffee. With a smile, she said I would have to go up to the castle for that. I asked Marion Davies about this. She said W. R. (Hearst) did not approve of breakfast in bed." Adjacent to Casa del Mar is the wellhead (Italian: Pozzo) from Phoebe Hearst's Hacienda del Pozo de Verona, which Hearst moved to San Simeon when he sold his mother's estate after her death in 1919.

=== Casa del Monte ===
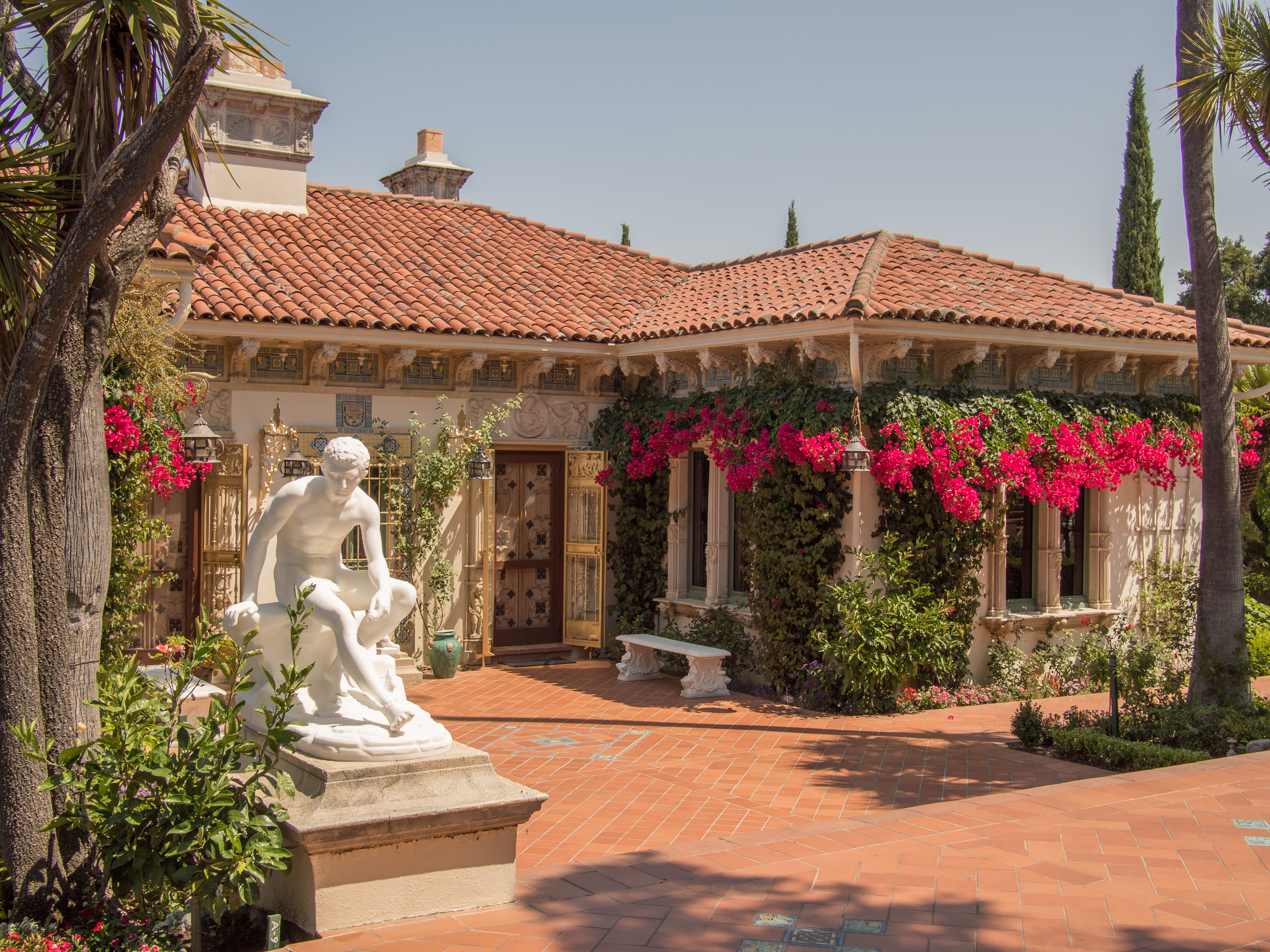
The single-story front elevation of Casa del Monte

Casa del Monte was the first of the guest houses, originally entitled simply Houses A (del Mar), B (del Monte) and C (del Sol), built by Morgan on the slopes below the site of Casa Grande during 1920–1924. Hearst had initially wanted to begin work with the construction of the main house but Morgan persuaded him to begin with the guest cottages because the smaller structures could be completed more quickly. Each guest house faces the Esplanade and appears as a single story at its front entrance. Additional stories descend rearward down the terraced mountain side. Casa del Monte has 2,550 sq ft (237 m^{2}) of living space.

=== Casa del Sol ===
The rear elevation of Casa del Sol. The guest houses flank Casa Grande, echoing a tented encampment, and are single-storied at the front elevations with multiple levels to the rear.

The decorative style of the Casa del Sol is Moorish, accentuated by the use of antique Persian tiles. A bronze copy of Donatello's David stands atop a copy of an original Spanish fountain. (Note: Ken Murray, the home movie maker who chronicled San Simeon at its social apogee, incorrectly identifies the fountain as an Italian original.) The inspiration for the fountain came from an illustration in a book, The Minor Ecclesiastical, Domestic and Garden Architecture of Southern Spain, written by Austin Whittlesey and published in 1919. Hearst sent a copy to Morgan, while retaining another for himself, and it proved a fertile source of ideas. The size of the house is 3,620 square feet (336 square metres). Morgan's staff were responsible for the cataloguing of those parts of Hearst's art collection which were shipped to California and an oral record made in the 1980s indicates the methodology used for furnishing the buildings at San Simeon. "We would set (the object) up and then I would stand with a yardstick to give it scale. Sam Crow would take a picture. Then we would give it a number and I would write a description. These were made into albums. When Mr Hearst would write and say 'I want a Florentine mantel in Cottage C in Room B, and four yards of tiles', then we would look it up in the books and find something that would fit."

=== Casa Grande ===
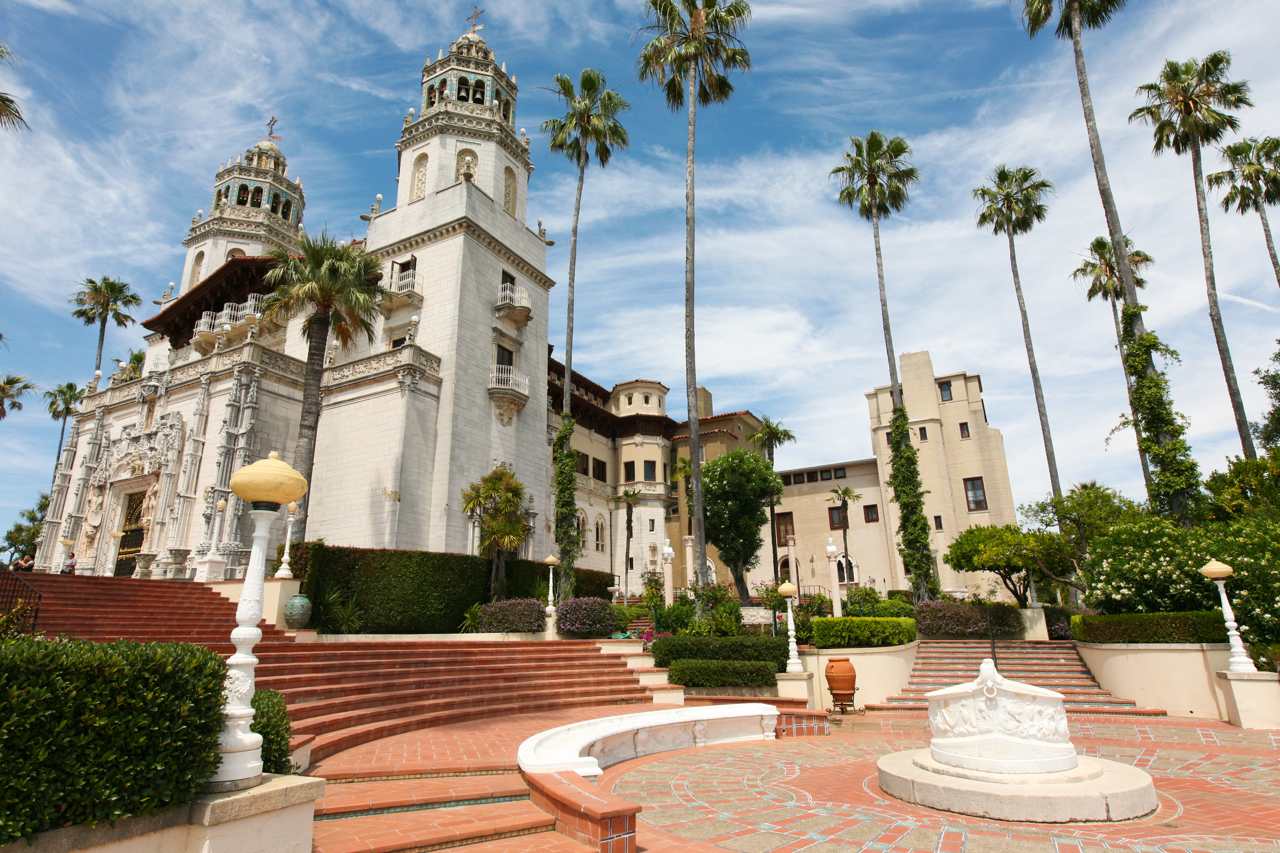
Casa Grande from the Esplanade

Construction of Casa Grande began in April 1922. Work continued almost until Hearst's final departure on May 2, 1947, and even then the house was unfinished. The size of Casa Grande is 68,500 square feet (6,360 square metres). The main western facade is four stories, the entrance front, inspired by a gateway in Seville, is flanked by twin bell towers modeled on the tower of the church of Santa Maria la Mayor. The layout of the main house was originally to a T-plan, with the assembly room to the front, and the refectory at a right angle to its center. (Note: The "somewhat unusual" T-plan was dictated in part by the presence of two old oaks on the site which, as Hearst was unwilling to uproot them, led Morgan to fit the main structure around them. Later, the castle workforce would develop considerable skill in relocating large oak trees by tunneling under them, encasing them in reinforced concrete and moving them on rollers to their desired new locations.) The subsequent extensions of the North and South wings modified the original design. As elsewhere, the core construction material is concrete, though the façade is faced in stone. In October 1927 Morgan wrote to Arthur Byne; "We finally took the bull by the horns and are facing the entire main building with a Manti stone from Utah." Morgan assured Hearst that it would be "the making of the building". A cast-stone balcony fronts the second floor, and another in cast-iron the third. Above this is a large wooden overhang or gable. This was constructed in Siamese teak, originally intended to outfit a ship, which Morgan located in San Francisco. The carving was undertaken by her senior carver Jules Suppo. Sara Holmes Boutelle suggests Morgan may have been inspired by a somewhat similar example at the Mission San Xavier del Bac in Arizona. The façade terminates with the bell towers, comprising the Celestial suites, the carillon towers and two cupolas.

The curator Victoria Kastner notes a particular feature of Casa Grande, the absence of any grand staircases. Access to the upper floors is either by elevators or stairwells in the corner turrets of the building. Many of the stairwells are undecorated and the plain, poured concrete contrasts with the richness of the decoration elsewhere. The terrace in front of the entrance, named Central Plaza, has a quatrefoil pond at its center, with a statue of Galatea on a Dolphin. The statue was inherited, having been bought by Phoebe Hearst when her son was temporarily short of money. The doorway from the Central Plaza into Casa Grande illustrates Morgan and Hearst's relaxed approach to combining genuine antiques with modern reproductions to achieve the effects they both desired. A 16th-century iron gate from Spain is topped by a fanlight grille, constructed in a matching style in the 1920s by Ed Trinkeller, the castle's main ironmonger. (Note: In a letter to Hearst dated June 3rd 1927, Morgan wrote of the 'wormers', carpenters who artificially aged new work; "the Gothic Sitting Room ceiling is in. It took some real good nature on the part of the 'wormers' to match up new with old work".)

The castle made use of the latest technology. Casa Grande was wired with an early sound system, allowing guests to make music selections which were played from a Capehart phonograph located in the basement, and piped into rooms in the house through a system of speakers. Alternatively, six radio stations were available. The entire estate was also equipped with 80 telephones, operated through a PBX switchboard, which was staffed 24 hours a day, and ran under the exclusive exchange 'Hacienda'. Fortune recorded an example of Hearst's delighting in the ubiquitous access the system provided - "(a guest) fell to wondering how a ball game came out while seated by a campfire with Mr Hearst, a day's ride from the castle. 'I'll tell you' volunteers Mr Hearst and, fumbling with the rock against which he was leaning, pulls from there a telephone, asks for New York, and relieves his guest's curiosity".

==== Assembly room ====
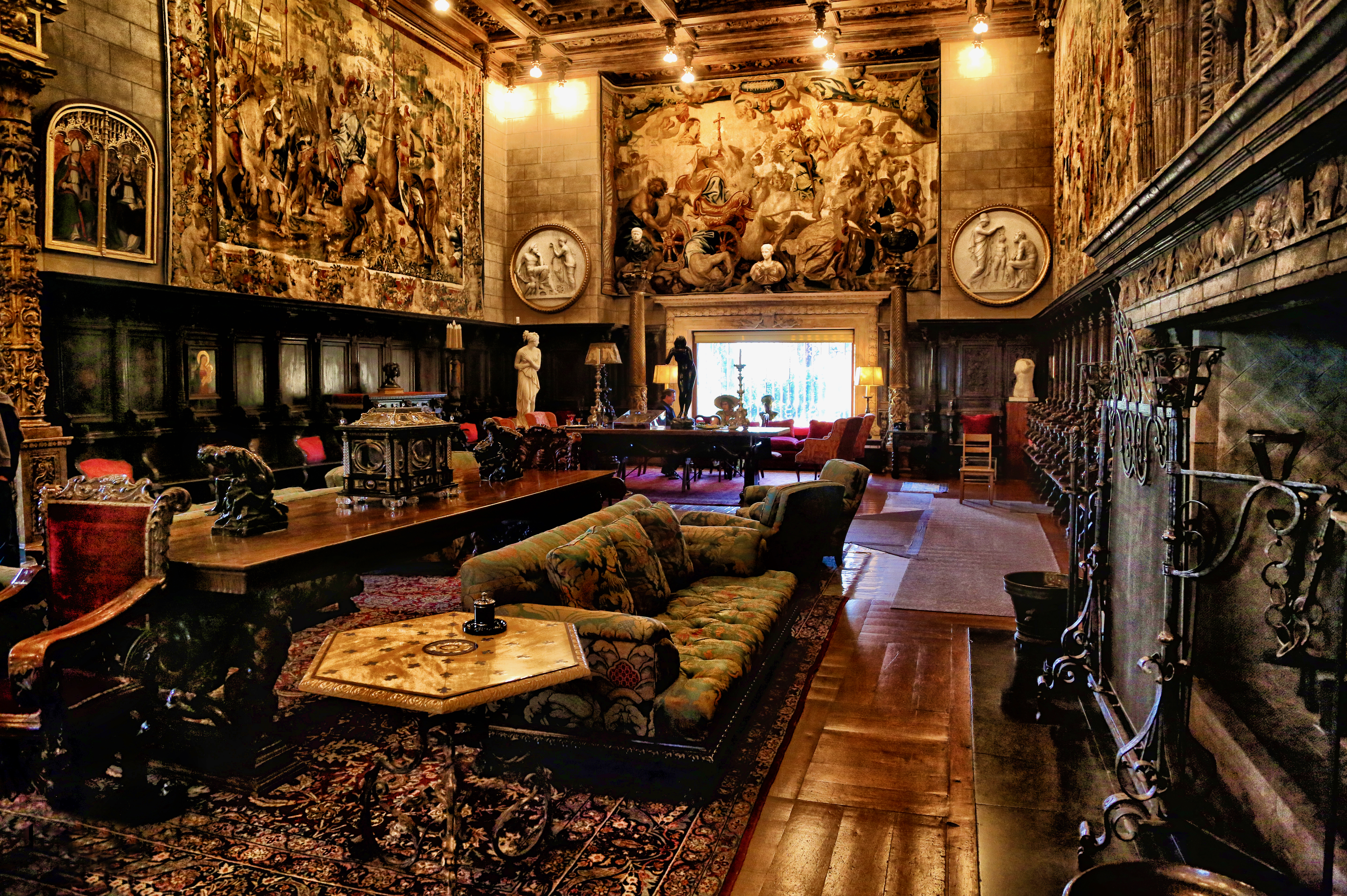
The assembly room

The assembly room is the main reception room of the castle, described by Taylor Coffman, in his 1985 study, Hearst Castle: The Story of William Randolph Hearst and San Simeon, as "one of San Simeon's most magnificent interiors". The fireplace, originally from a Burgundian chateau in Jours-lès-Baigneux, is named the Great Barney Mantel, after a previous owner, Charles T. Barney, from whose estate Hearst bought it after Barney's suicide. The mantel had been acquired for Barney by society architect Stanford White and Kastner notes the major influence of White's style on a number of rooms at Hearst Castle, in particular the assembly room and the main sitting room in Casa del Mar. The ceiling is from an Italian palazzo. A concealed door in the paneling next to the fireplace allowed Hearst to surprise his guests by entering unannounced. The door opened off an elevator which connected with his Gothic suite on the third floor. The assembly room, completed in 1926, is nearly 2,500 square feet in extent and was described by the writer and illustrator Ludwig Bemelmans as looking like "half of Grand Central station".

The room held some of Hearst's best tapestries. These include four from a set celebrating the Roman general Scipio Africanus, designed by Giulio Romano, and two copied from drawings by Peter Paul Rubens depicting The Triumph of Religion. The need to fit the tapestries above the paneling and below the roof required the installation of the unusually low windows. The room has the only piece of Art Nouveau decorative art in the castle, the Orchid Vase lamp, made by Tiffany for the Exposition Universelle held in Paris in 1889. Bought by Phoebe Hearst, who had the original vase converted to a lamp, Hearst placed it in the assembly room in tribute to his mother.

==== Refectory ====
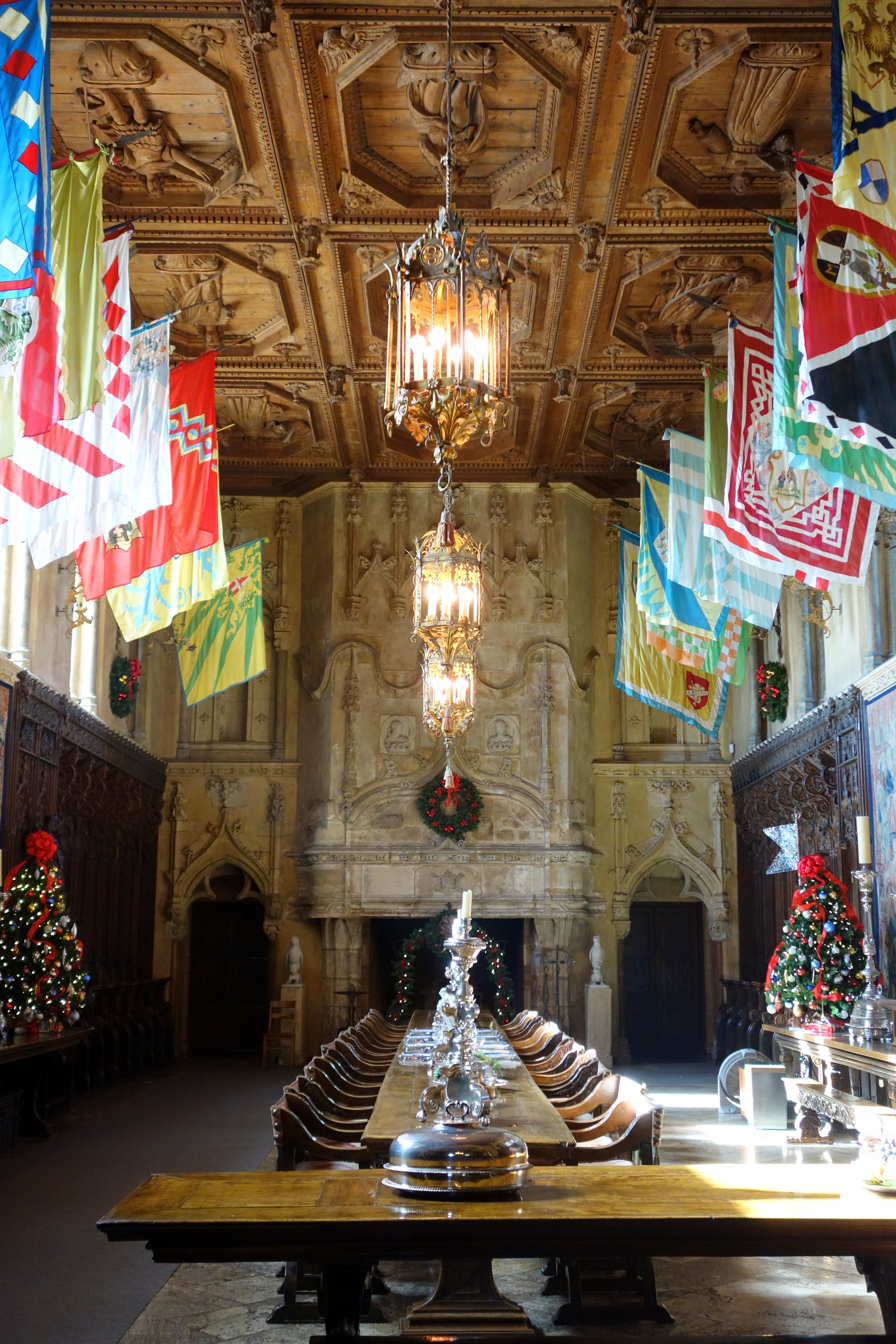
The refectory

The refectory was the only dining room in the castle, and was built between 1926 and 1927. The choir stalls which line the walls are from the La Seu d'Urgell Cathedral in Catalonia, Spain, and the silk flags mounted on the walls are Palio banners from Siena, Italy. (Note: The banners now hanging in the refectory are copies, the originals having proved too fragile to allow for their permanent display.) Hearst originally intended a "vaulted Moorish ceiling" for the room but, finding nothing suitable, he and Morgan settled on the Italian Renaissance example, dating from around 1600, which Hearst purchased from a dealer in Rome in 1924. Victoria Kastner considered that the flat roof, with life-size carvings of saints, "strikes a discordant note of horizontality among the vertical lines of the room". The style of the whole is Gothic, in contrast to the Renaissance approach adopted in the preceding assembly room. The refectory is said to have been Morgan's favorite interior within the castle. The design of both the refectory and the assembly room was greatly influenced by the monumental architectural elements, especially the fireplaces and the choir stalls used as wainscoting, and works of art, particularly the tapestries, which Hearst determined would be incorporated into the rooms. The central table provided seating for 22 in its usual arrangement of two tables, which could be extended to three or four, on the occasion of larger gatherings. The tables were sourced from an Italian monastery and were the setting for some of the best pieces from Hearst's collection of silverware. One of the finest is a wine cooler dating from the early 18th century and weighing 14.2 kg by the Anglo-French silversmith David Willaume.

==== Library ====
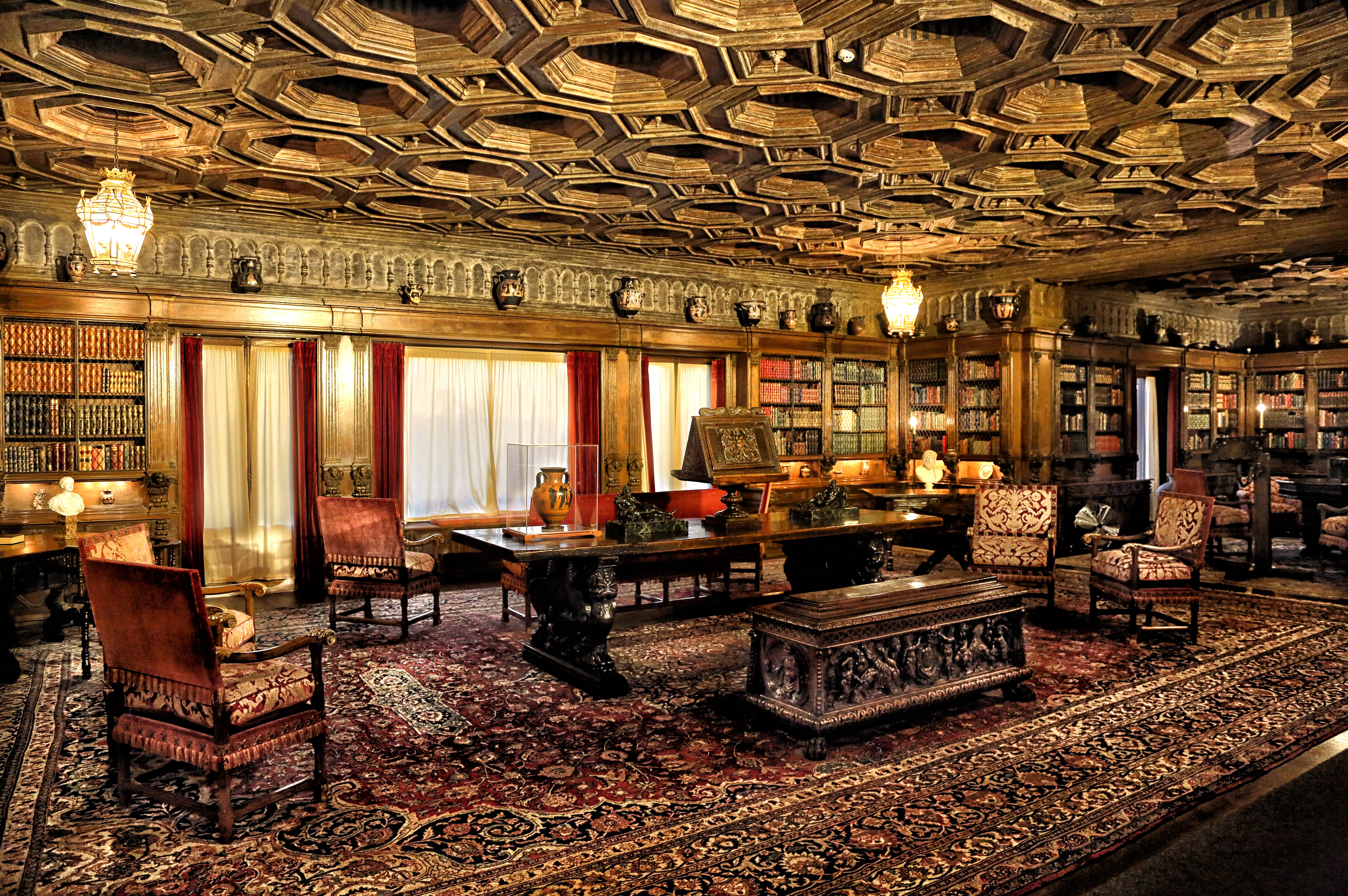
The library, with some of Hearst's collection of ancient Greek vases on the bookshelves

The library is on the second floor, directly above the assembly room. The ceiling is 16th century Spanish, and a remnant is used in the library's lobby. It comprises three separate ceilings, from different rooms in the same Spanish house, which Morgan combined into one. The fireplace is the largest Italian example in the castle. Carved from limestone, it is attributed to the medieval sculptor and architect Benedetto da Maiano. The room contains a collection of over 5,000 books, with another 3,700 in Hearst's study above. The majority of the library collections were sold at sales at Parke-Bernet at 1939 and Gimbels in 1941. The sales saw the disposal of some of the best items, including sets, often signed, of first editions by Charles Dickens, Hearst's favorite author. The library is also the location for much of Hearst's important holding of antique Greek vases.

==== Cloisters and the Doge's Suite ====
The cloisters form a grouping of four bedrooms above the refectory and, along with the doge's suite above the breakfast room, were completed in 1925–1926. The doge's suite was occupied by Millicent Hearst on her rare visits to the castle. The room is lined with blue silk and has a Dutch painted ceiling, in addition to two more of Spanish origin, which was once the property of architect Stanford White. Morgan also incorporated an original Venetian loggia in the suite, refashioned as a balcony. The suite leads on to Morgan's inventive North and South Duplex apartments, with sitting areas and bathrooms at entry level and bedrooms on mezzanine floors above.

==== Gothic suite ====
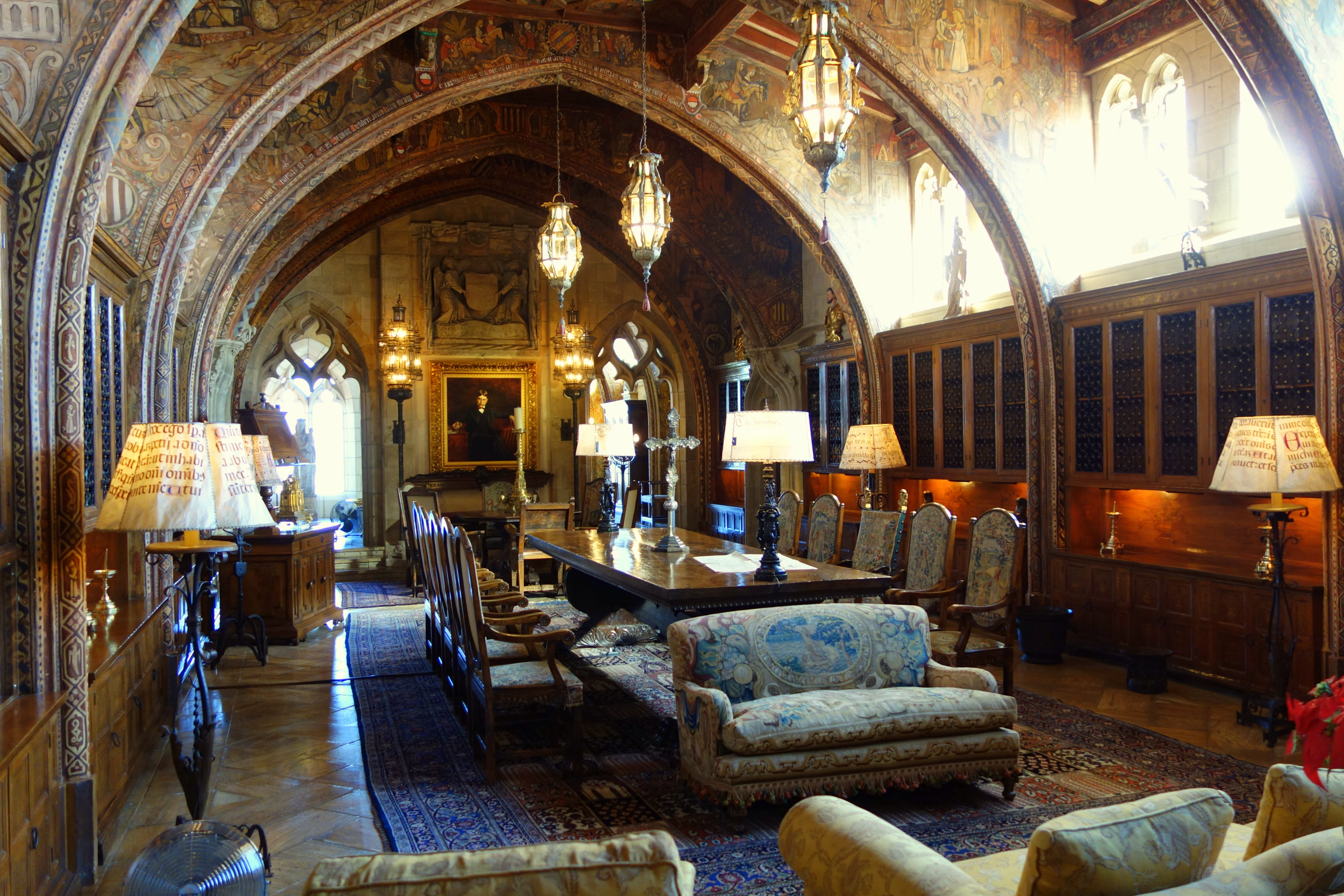
The gothic library, with Orrin Peck's portrait of Hearst on the far wall

The gothic suite was Hearst's private apartment on the third floor. He moved there in 1927. It comprises the gothic study or library and Hearst's own gothic bedroom and private sitting room. The ceiling of the bedroom is one of the best Hearst bought; Spanish, of the 14th century, it was discovered by his Iberian agent Arthur Byne who also located the original frieze panels which had been detached and sold some time before. (Note: Byne was Hearst's single most successful supplier of Spanish antiques and architectural pieces. Of the thirty antique ceilings incorporated into buildings on the estate, Byne sourced more than any other single supplier.) The whole was installed at the castle in 1924. The space originally allocated for the study was too low to create the impression desired by Morgan and Hearst, a difficulty Morgan surmounted by raising the roof and supporting the ceiling with concrete trusses. These, and the walls, were painted with frescoes by Camille Solon. Light was provided by two ranges of clerestory windows. The necessity of raising the roof to incorporate the study occasioned one of the few instances where Hearst hesitated, "I telegraphed you my fear of the cost...I imagine it would be ghastly", and Morgan urged further changes and expense. The result vindicated Morgan. The study, completed in 1931, is dominated by a portrait of Hearst at age 31, painted by his life-long friend, Orrin Peck.

==== Celestial suites ====
The celestial bedrooms, with a connecting, shared, sitting room, were created between 1924 and 1926. The bell towers were raised to improve the proportions of the building, and the suites constructed in the spaces created below. The relatively cramped spaces allowed no room for storage, and en-suite bathrooms were "awkwardly squeezed" into lower landings. Ludwig Bemelmans, a guest in the 1930s, recalled; "there was no place to hang your clothes, so I hung mine on wire coat hangers that a former tenant had left hanging on the arms of two six-armed gold candelabra, the rest I put on the floor". The sitting room contains one of the most important paintings in Hearst's collection, Bonaparte Before the Sphinx (1886) by Jean-Léon Gérôme. The suites are linked externally by a walkway, the celestial bridge, which is decorated with elaborate tiling.

==== North and South wings ====
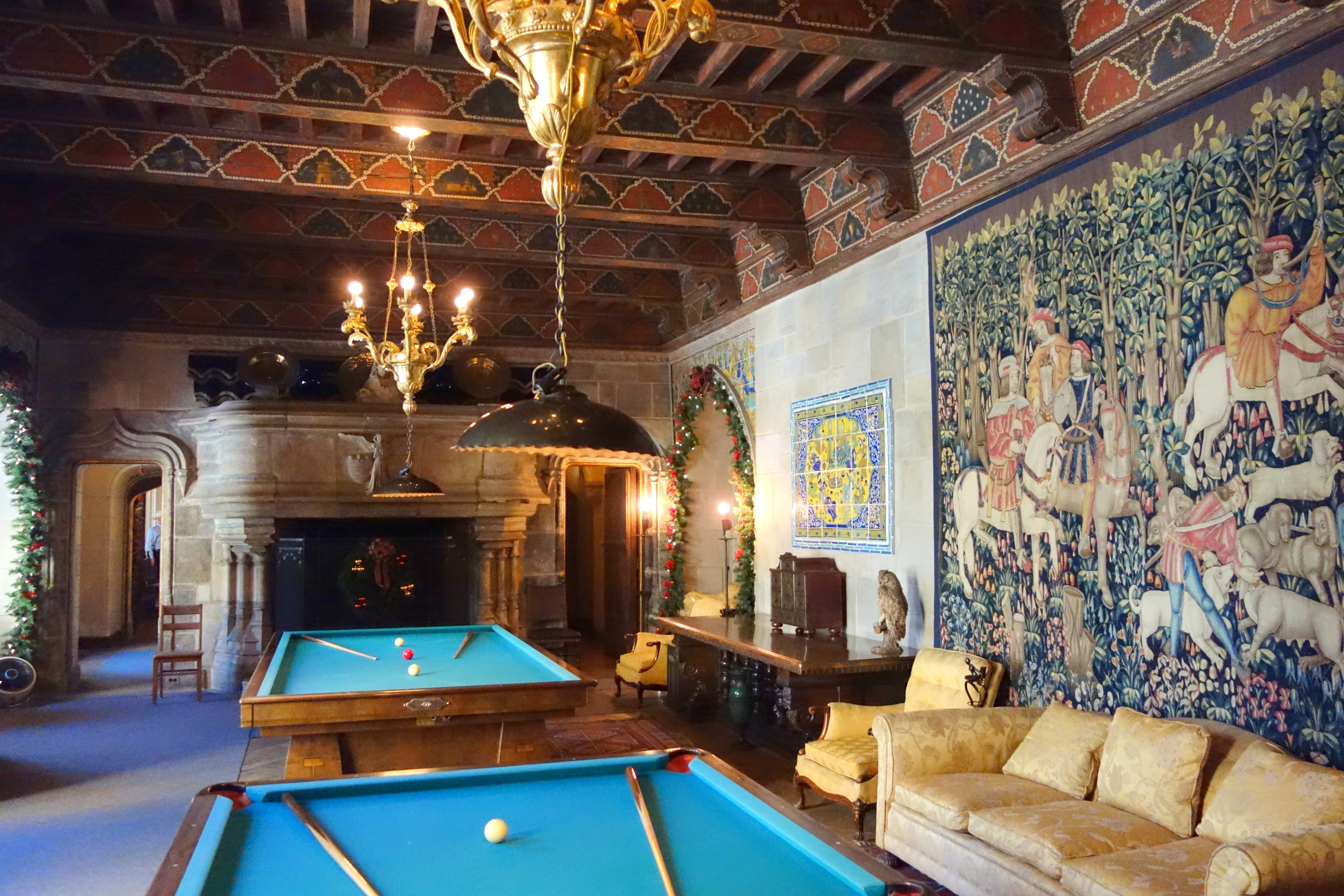
The billiard room with part of the millefleur tapestry to the right.

The north, or billiard, and the south, or service, wings complete the castle and were begun in 1929. The north wing houses the billiard room on the first floor, which was converted from the original breakfast room. It has a Spanish antique ceiling and a French fireplace and contains the oldest tapestry in the castle, a Millefleur hunting scene woven in Flanders in the 15th century. The spandrel over the doorcase is decorated with a frieze of 16th-century Persian tiles depicting a battle. The 34 tiles originate from Isfahan and were purchased by Hearst at the Kevorkian sale in New York in 1922. The theater, which leads off the billiard room, was used both for amateur theatricals and the showing of movies from Hearst's Cosmopolitan Studios. The theater accommodated fifty guests and had an electric keyboard that enabled the bells in the carillon towers to be played. The walls are decorated in red damask, which originally hung in the assembly room, and feature gilded caryatids.

The upper stories of the north wing were the last to be worked upon and were never completed. Activity recommenced in 1945 and Morgan delegated the work to her assistant, Warren McClure. Many of the rooms are unfinished but Aidala considers that the bathrooms in the wing represent "first-rate examples of streamline design. The service wing contains the kitchen. The hotel-scale units and worktops are constructed in Monel metal, an expensive form of nickel alloy invented in 1901. The wing contains further bedroom suites, a staff dining room and gives entry to the 9,000-square-foot basement which contained a wine cellar, pantries, the boiler plant which heated the main house, and a barber/hairdressing parlour, for the use of Hearst's guests.

=== Planned but uncompleted elements ===
Hearst and Morgan intended a large ballroom or cloister to connect the North and South wings at the rear of Casa Grande and unify the whole composition but it was never undertaken. In 1932, Hearst contemplated incorporating the reja (grille) he had acquired from Valladolid Cathedral in 1929 into this room. He described his vision in a letter to Morgan dated that year; "A great ballroom and banqueting hall, that is the scheme! Isn't it a pippin." The letter was signed "Sincerely, Your Assistant Architect". Other structures that did not develop beyond drawings and plans included two more guest houses, in English and Chinese architectural styles. (Note: A plan, elaborate even by Hearst's standards, for a winter garden on the hill, to be a "combination orchid-greenhouse and indoor pool – with plate-glass partition for sharks", never materialized.)

== Collections ==
Why didn't you buy Ansiglioni's Galatea. It is superb...I have a great notion to buy it myself, the one thing that prevents me is a scarcity of funds. The man wants eight thousand dollars for the blooming thing. I have the art fever terribly. Queer, isn't it? I never miss a gallery and I go and nosey about the pictures and statuary and wish they were mine.

— Hearst's letter of 1889 to his mother after a visit to Ansiglioni's workshop

Hearst was a voracious collector of art, with the stated intention of making the castle "a museum of the best things that I can secure". The dealer Joseph Duveen, from whom Hearst bought despite their mutual dislike, called him the "Great Accumulator". His robust approach to buying, particularly the purchase and removal of entire historic structures, generated considerable ill-feeling and sometimes outright opposition. His deconstruction and removal of the 14th century Bradenstoke Priory in England led the Society for the Protection of Ancient Buildings to organize a campaign which used language so violent that its posters had to be pasted over for fear of a libel suit. (Note: Hearst's biographer David Nasaw refers to elements of the priory being discovered in crates in a Hearst Corporation warehouse in Los Angeles in 1960. These were subsequently sold to a hotelier in San Luis Obispo whose son was, as of 2018, planning to reconstruct them.) Hearst sometimes encountered similar opposition elsewhere. In 1919 he was writing to Morgan about; "the patio from Bergos (sic) which, by the way, I own but cannot get out of Spain". The dismantling of a monastery in Sacramenia, which Hearst bought in its entirety in the 1920s, saw his workmen attacked by enraged villagers. Hearst's tardiness in paying his bills was another less attractive feature of his purchasing approach; in 1925 Morgan was obliged to write to Arthur Byne, "Mr. Hearst accepts your dictum – cash or nothing". (Note: Social upheaval in Spain in the 1920s and 1930s, which led eventually to the outbreak of civil war, made buying and removing artifacts problematic but also offered opportunities. In October 1923 Byne wrote to Hearst, "with a threatened revolution, I found the owner in a much more reasonable mood; in fact rather anxious to sell".)

Some of the finest pieces from the collections of books and manuscripts, tapestries, paintings, antiquities and sculpture, amounting to about half of Hearst's total art holdings, were sold in sales in the late 1930s and early 1940s, when Hearst's publishing empire was facing financial collapse, but a great deal remains. His art buying had started when he was young and, in his tested fashion, he established a company, the International Studio Arts Corporation, as a vehicle for purchasing works and as a means of dealing with their export and import. The curator Mary Levkoff divides the collection into four parts, the antiquities, the sculptures, the tapestries and the paintings, of which she considers the last of least significance. In 1975, the Hearst Corporation donated the archive of Hearst's Brooklyn warehouses, the gathering point for almost all of his European acquisitions before their dispersal to his many homes, to Long Island University. As of 2015, the university has embarked on a digitization project which will ultimately see the 125 albums of records, and sundry other materials, made available online.

=== Antiquities ===
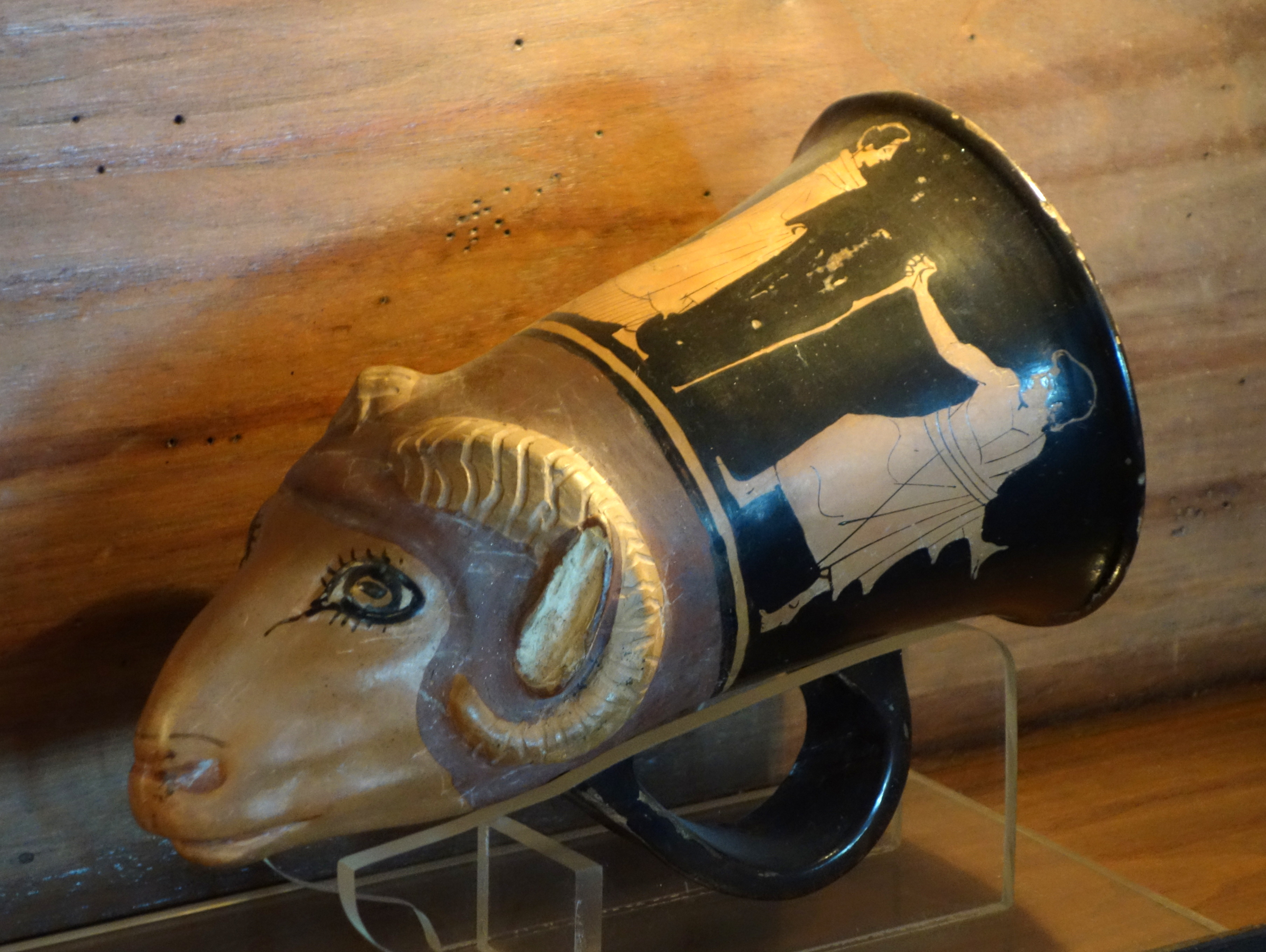
A Greek rhyton

The ancient Egyptian, Greek and Roman antiquities are the oldest works in Hearst's collection. The oldest of all are the stone figures of the Egyptian goddess Sekhmet which stand on the South Esplanade below Casa Grande and date from the Eighteenth and Nineteenth Dynasties, approximately 1550 to 1189 BC. Morgan designed the pool setting for the pieces, with tiling inspired by ancient Egyptian motifs. In the courtyard of Casa del Monte is one of a total of nine Roman sarcophagi collected by Hearst, dated to 230 AD and previously held at the Palazzo Barberini, which was acquired at the Charles T. Yerkes sale in 1910. The most important element of the antiquities collection is the holding of Greek vases, on display in the second-floor library. Although some 65 vases were purchased by the Metropolitan Museum of Art in New York after Hearst's death, those which remain at the castle still form one of the world's largest groups. (Note: One of the oldest examples is the Baring Amphora, dating from 740BC and purchased by Hearst at the Revelstone sale in London in 1935.) Hearst began collecting vases in 1901, and his collection was moved from his New York homes to the castle in 1935. At its peak, the collection numbered over 400 pieces. The vases were placed on the tops of the bookshelves in the library, each carefully wired in place to guard against vibrations from earthquakes. At the time of Hearst's collecting, many of the vases were believed to be of Etruscan manufacture, but later scholars ascribe all of them to Greece.

=== Sculptures ===
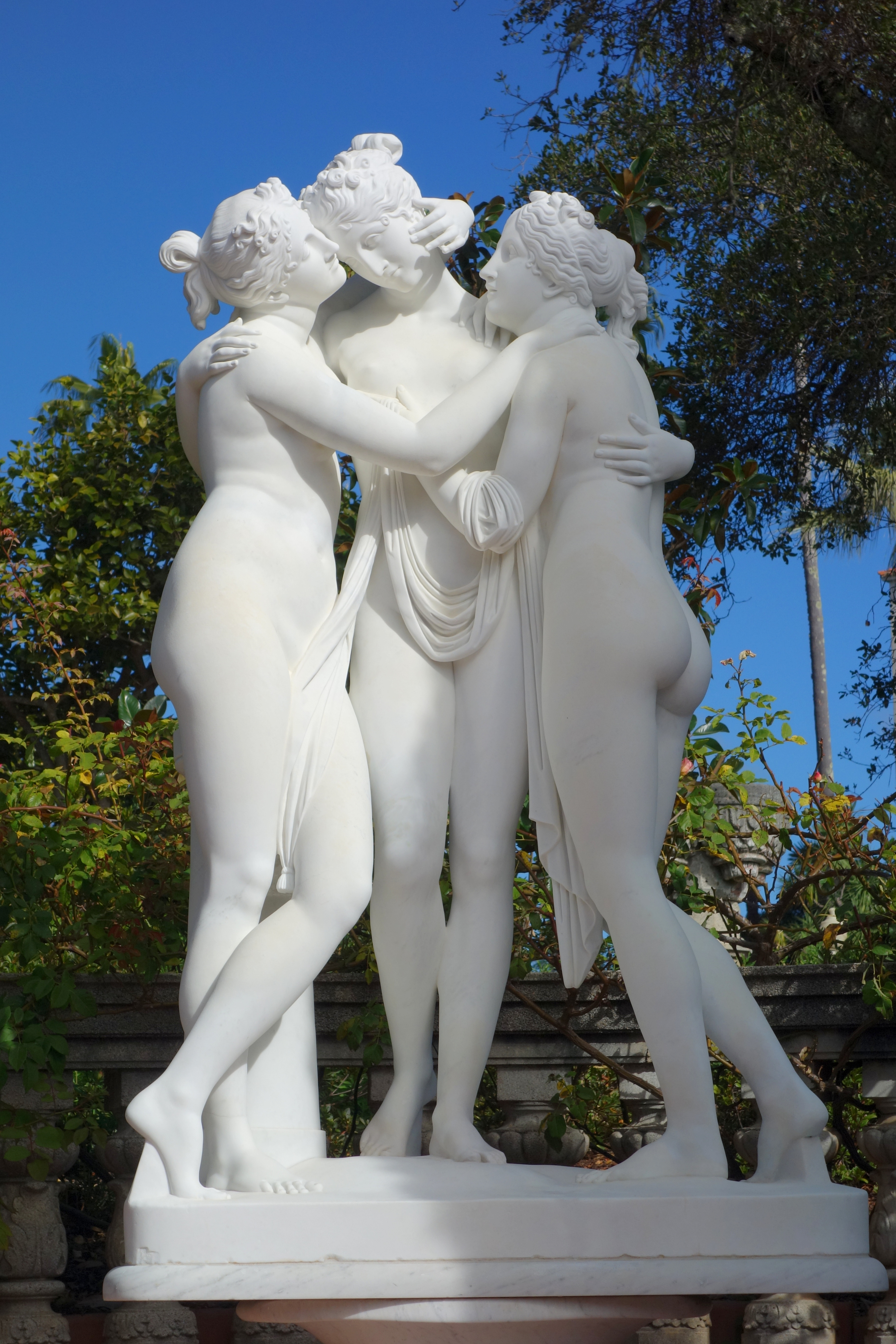
Three Graces – copy of an original by Canova

Hearst often bought multiple lots from sales of major collections; in 1930 he purchased five antique Roman statues from the Lansdowne sale in London. Four are now in the collection of the Los Angeles County Museum of Art and one in the Metropolitan. He collected bronzes as well as marble figures; a cast of a stone original of Apollo and Daphne by Bernini, dating from around 1617, stands in the Doge's suite.

In addition to his classical sculptures, Hearst was content to acquire 19th century versions, or contemporary copies of ancient works; "if we cannot find the right thing in a classic statue we can find a modern one". He was a particular patron of Charles Cassou and also favored the early 19th-century Danish sculptor Bertel Thorvaldsen whose Venus Victorious remains at the castle. Both this, and the genuinely classical Athena from the collection of Thomas Hope, were displayed in the Assembly room, along with the Venus Italica by Antonio Canova. Other works by Thorvaldsen include the four large marble medallions in the Assembly room depicting society's virtues. Two 19th-century marbles are in the anteroom to the Assembly room, Bacchante, by Frederick William MacMonnies, a copy of his bronze original and Pygmalion and Galatea by Gérôme. A monumental statue of Galatea, attributed to Leopoldo Ansiglioni and dating from around 1882, stands in the center of the pool on the plaza in front of Casa Grande.

=== Textiles ===
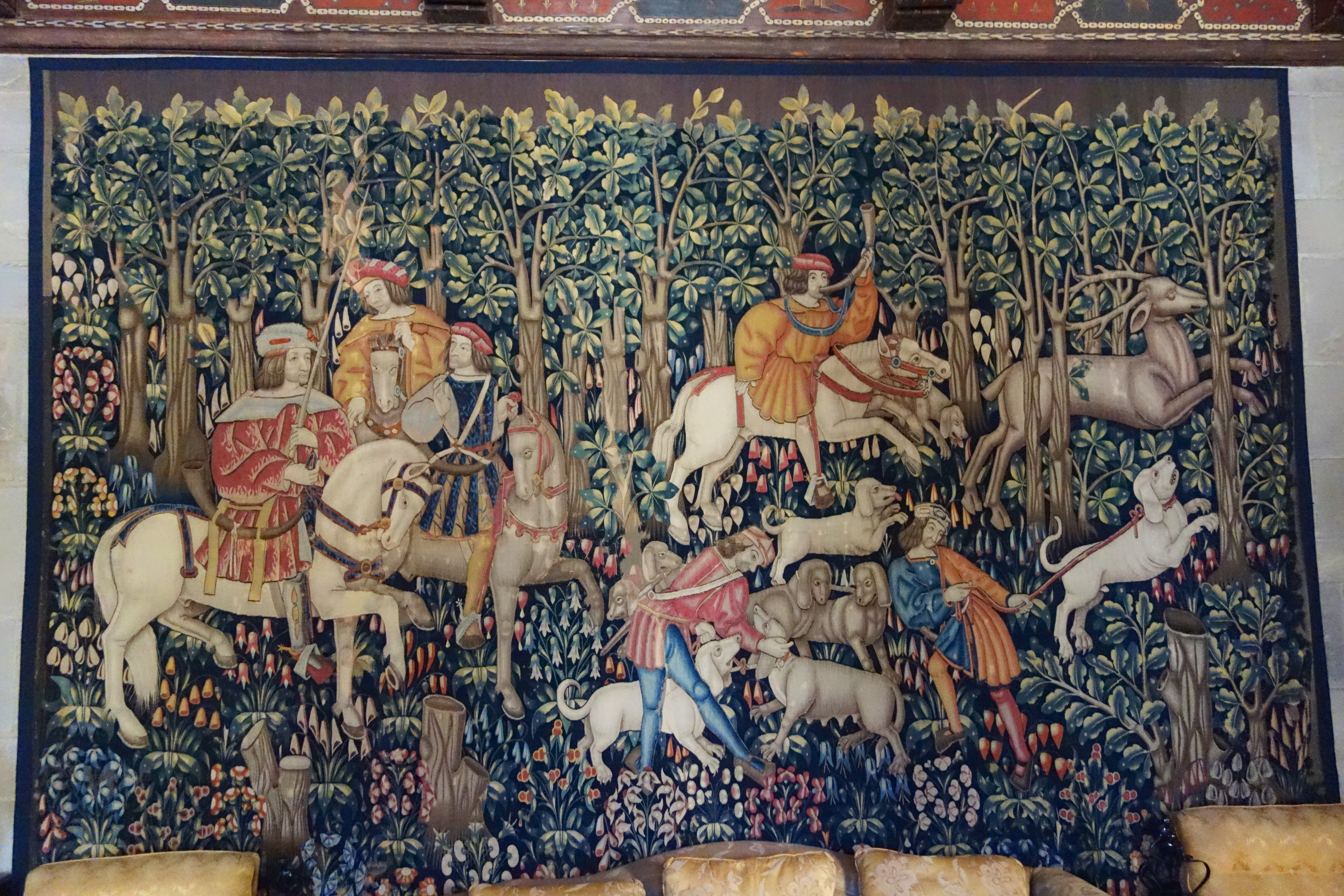
The millefleur tapestry in the billiard room

Tapestries include the Scipio set after Giulio Romano in the assembly room, two from a set telling the Biblical story of Daniel in the morning room, and the millefleur hunting scene in the Billiard room. The last is particularly rare, one of only "a handful from this period in the world". Hearst also assembled and displayed an important collection of Navajo textiles at San Simeon, including blankets, rugs and serapes. Most were purchased from Herman Schweizer, who ran the Indian Department of the Fred Harvey Company. Originally gathered at Hearst's hacienda at Jolon, they were moved to Wyntoon in 1940 before being brought to San Simeon and finally being donated to the Los Angeles County Museum of Art in 1942. Hearst was always interested in pieces that had historical and cultural connections to the history of California and Central and Latin America; the North Wing contains two Peruvian armorial banners. Dating from the 1580s, they show the shields of Don Luis Jerónimo Fernández Cabrera y Bobadilla, Count of Chinchón and viceroy of Peru. Nathaniel Burt, the composer and critic evaluated the collections at San Simeon thus; "Far from being the mere kitsch that most easterners have been led to believe, [San Simeon is] full of real beauties and treasures".

=== Paintings ===
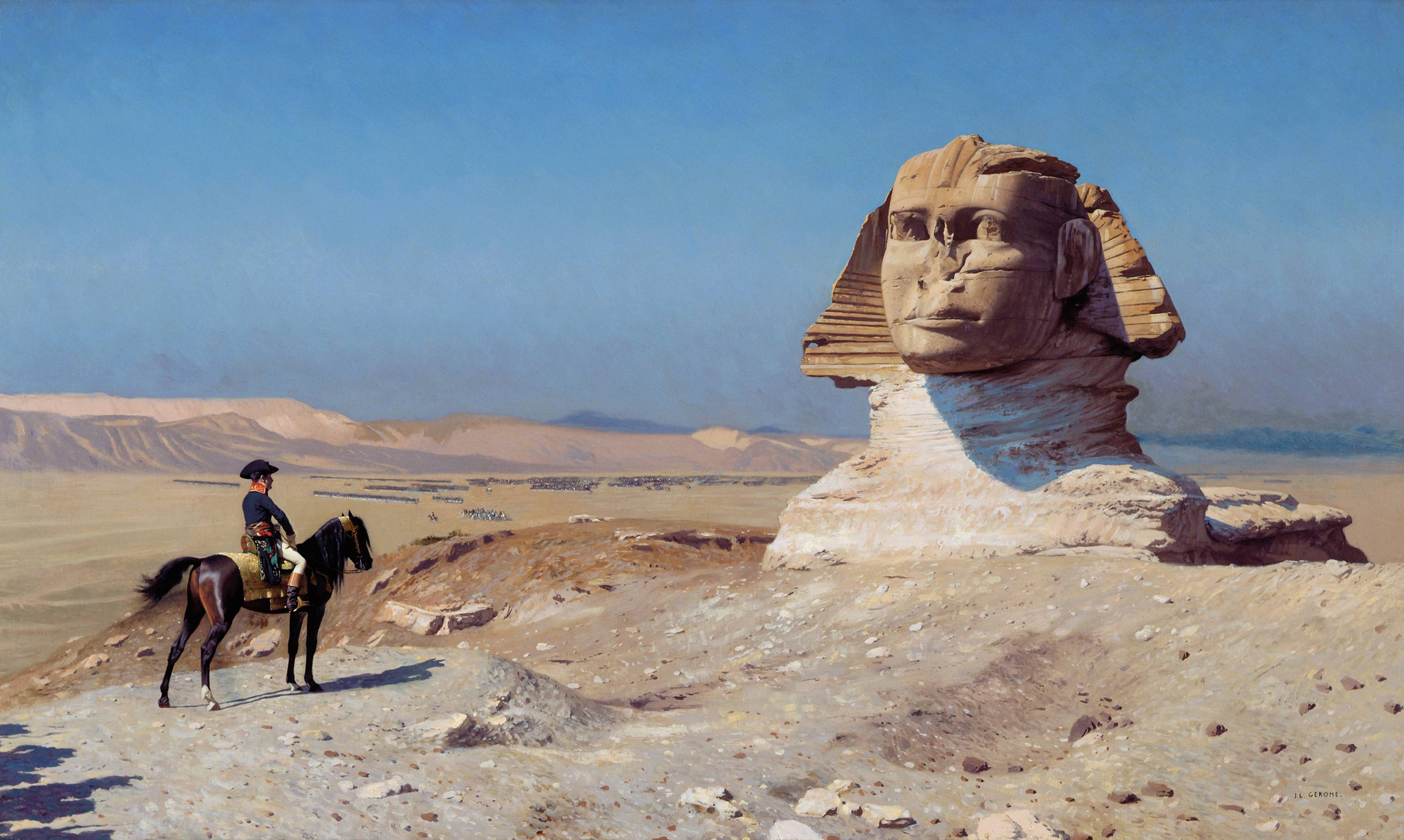
Gérôme's Bonaparte Before the Sphinx, which hangs in the sitting room of the celestial suite

The art collection includes works by Tintoretto, whose portrait of Alvisius Vendramin hangs in the Doge's suite, Franz Xaver Winterhalter who carried out the double portraits of Maximilian I of Mexico and his empress Carlota, located in Casa del Mar and two portraits of Napoléon by Jean-Léon Gérôme. Hearst's earliest painting, a Madonna and Child from the school of Duccio di Buoninsegna, dates from the early 14th century. A gift from his friend, the editor Cissy Patterson, the painting hangs in Hearst's bedroom. Portrait of a Woman, by Giulio Campi, hangs in a bedroom in the north wing. In 1928 Hearst acquired the Madonna and Child with Two Angels, by Adriaen Isenbrandt. The curator Taylor Coffman describes this work, which hangs in the Casa del Mar sitting room, as perhaps "San Simeon's finest painting". (Note: The Hearst Castle curator, Victoria Kastner, suggests this work may be by Ambrosius Benson. Both Isenbrandt and Benson were strongly influenced by the Flemish master Gerard David and both worked in Bruges in the early 16th century.) In 2018, a previously unattributed Annunciation in the assembly room was identified as a work of 1690 by Bartolomé Pérez.

== Gardens and grounds ==
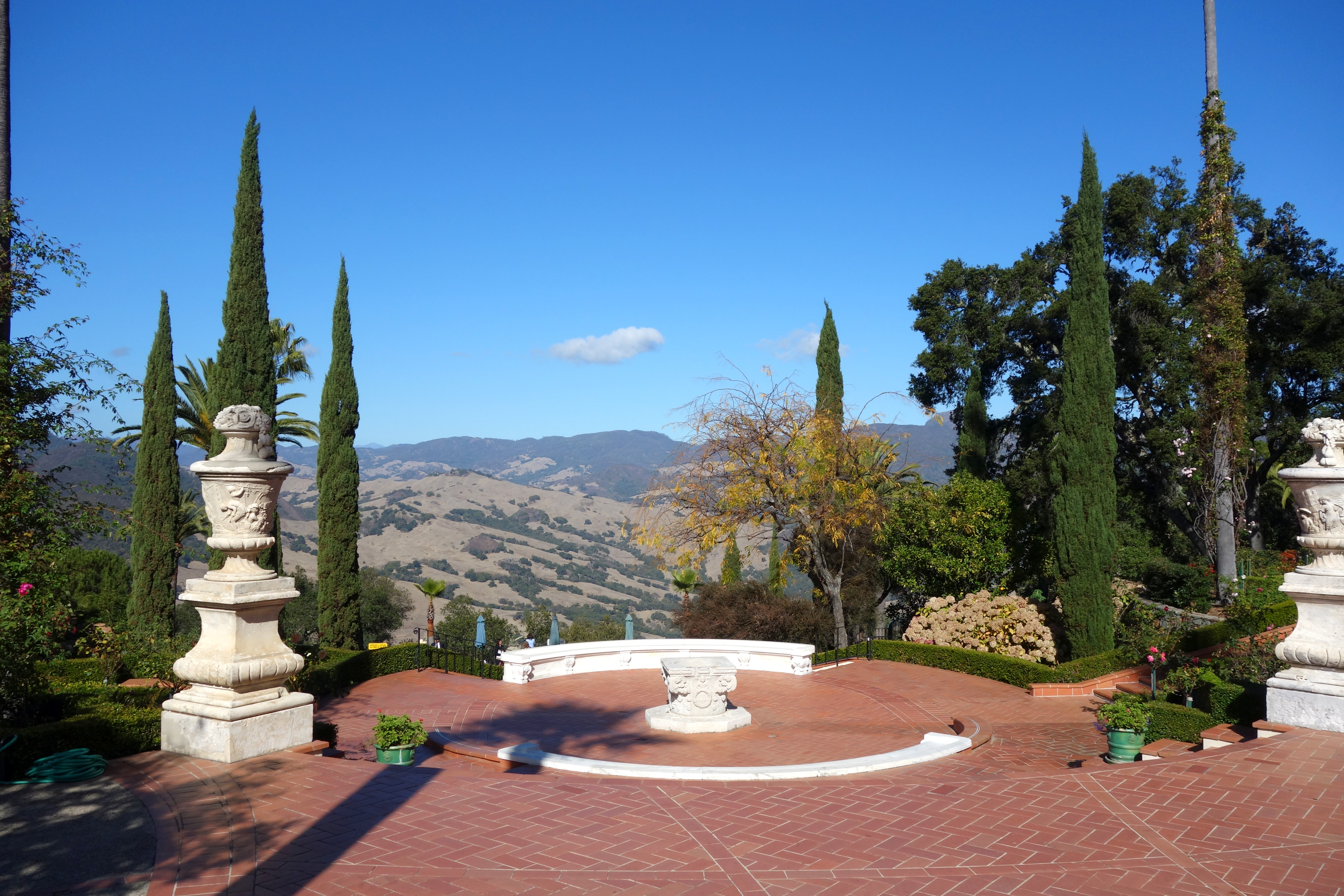
View from the esplanade at the North Lower Terrace

The Esplanade, a curving, paved walkway, connects the main house with the guest cottages; Hearst described it as giving "a finished touch to the big house, to frame it in, as it were". Morgan designed the pedestrianized pavement with great care, to create a coup de théâtre for guests, desiring "a strikingly noble and saississant effect be impressed upon everyone on arrival". Hearst concurred: "Heartily approve. I certainly want that saississant effect. I don't know what it is but I think we ought to have at least one such on the premises". A feature of the gardens are the lampposts topped with alabaster globes; modeled on "janiform hermae", the concept was Hearst's. (Note: In September 1927 Hearst wrote to Morgan; "take those caryatids from one of the Roman villas, where they are holding some kind of cup or globe on top of their heads, and make some kind of cast-stone models out of these and put lights in place of the vase".) The Swan lamps, remodeled with alabaster globe lights to match the hermae, were designed by Morgan's chief draftsman, Thaddeus Joy. Others whose ideas and approach influenced Hearst and Morgan in their landscaping include Charles Adams Platt, an artist and gardener who had made a particular study of the layout and planting of Italian villas; Nigel Keep, Hearst's orchardman, who worked at San Simeon from 1922 to 1947, and Albert Webb, Hearst's English head gardener who was at the hill during 1922–1948.

=== Neptune Pool ===
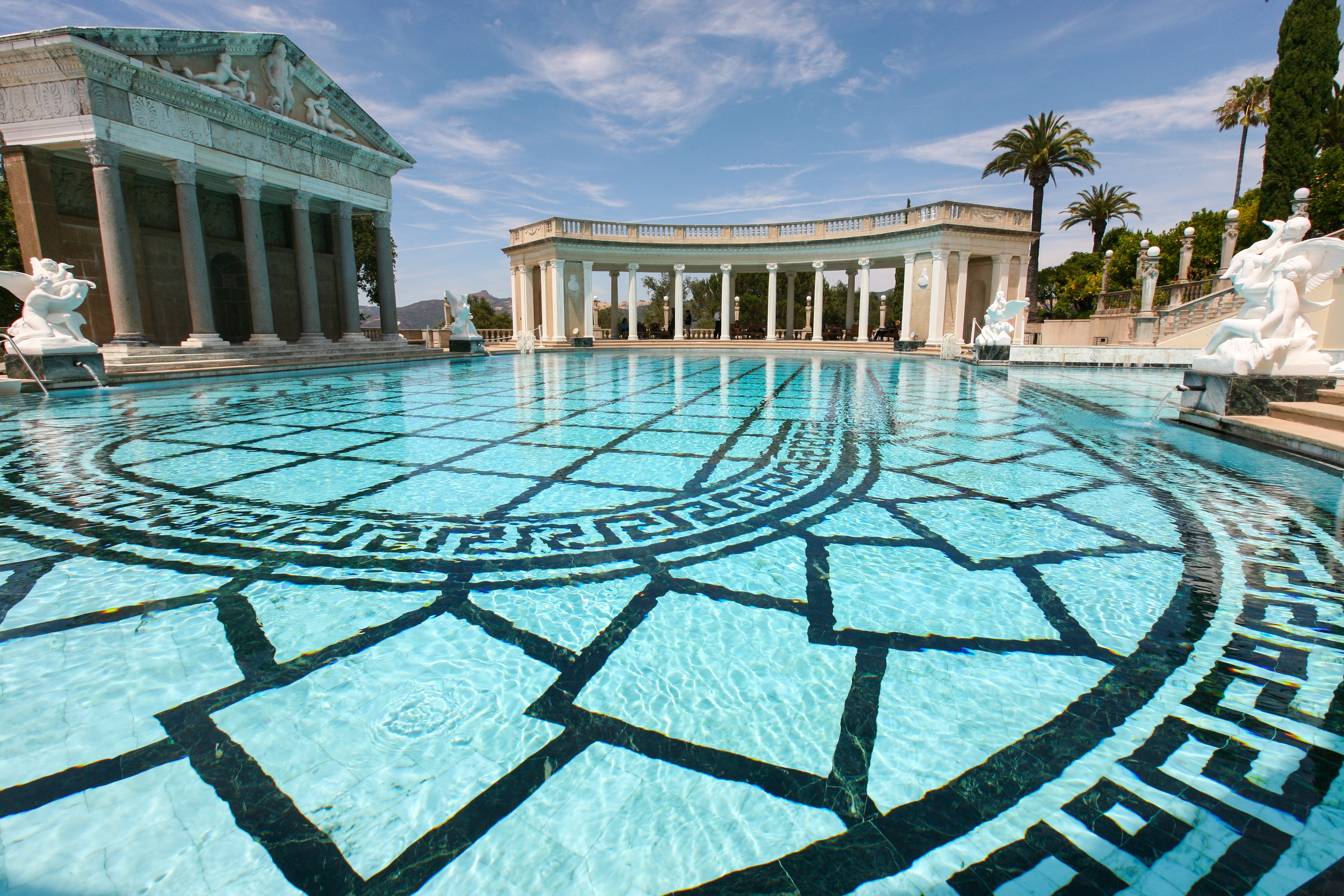
The Neptune pool

The Neptune pool, described by Ginger Wadsworth in her biography of Morgan as "the most sumptuous swimming pool on earth", is located near the edge of the hilltop and is enclosed by a retaining wall and underpinned by a framework of concrete struts to allow for movement in the event of earthquakes. The pool is often cited as an example of Hearst's changeability; it was reconstructed three times before he was finally satisfied. Originally begun as an ornamental pond, it was first expanded in 1924 as Millicent Hearst desired a swimming pool. It was enlarged again during 1926–1928 to accommodate Cassou's statuary. Finally, in 1934, it was extended again to act as a setting for a Roman temple, in part original and in part comprising elements from other structures which Hearst transported from Europe and had reconstructed at the site. The tiling was undertaken by Solon and Schemmel.

The pool holds 345,000 gallons of water and is equipped with seventeen shower and changing rooms. It was heated by oil-fired burners. In early 2014, the pool was drained due to drought conditions and leakage. After a long-term restoration project to fix the leaking, the pool was refilled in August 2018. The restoration of the pool was recognized with a Preservation Design Award for Craftsmanship from the California Preservation Foundation in 2019. The pool is well-supplied with sculpture, particularly works by Charles Cassou. His centerpiece, opposite the Roman temple, is The Birth of Venus. An even larger sculptural grouping, depicting Neptune in a chariot drawn by four horses, was commissioned to fill the empty basin above the Venus. Although carved, it was never installed. (Note: The grouping, completed by Cassou in the late 1930s, was not shipped to America until after Hearst's death due to post-war import restrictions. In 1956, the group was purchased by the Forest Lawn Memorial Park but was destroyed in a pier explosion at Brooklyn docks. Three other statues completed by Cassou at the same time as the Neptune, and depicting Diana and other mythological figures, ultimately made their way to Forest Lawn.)

=== Roman Pool ===
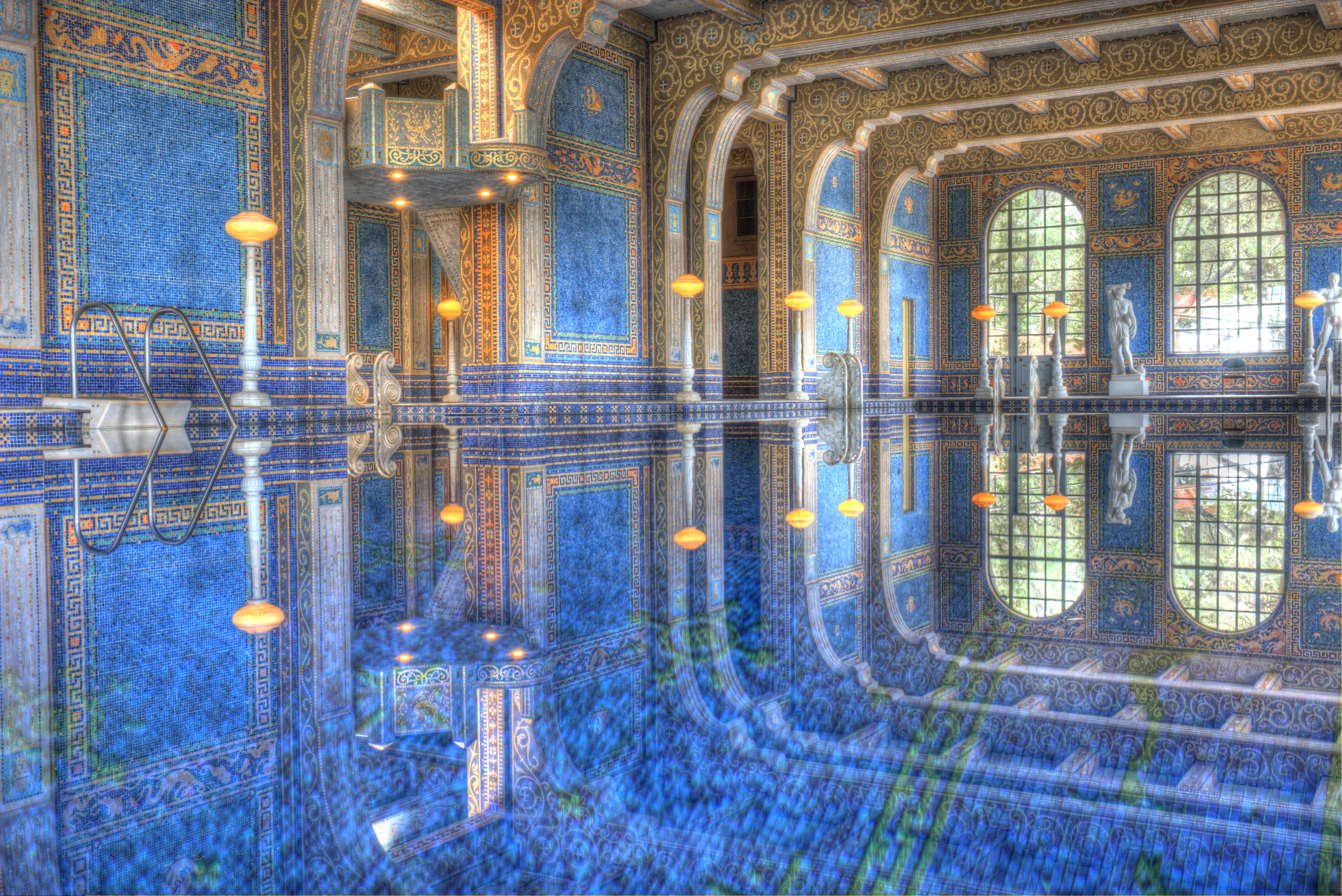
The Roman pool

The Roman pool, constructed under the tennis courts, provided an indoor alternative to the Neptune pool. Originally mooted by Hearst in 1927, construction did not begin until 1930 and the pool was not completed until 1935. Hearst initially wanted the pool to be fed by salt-water but the design challenges proved to be insuperable. A disastrous attempt to fulfill Hearst's desires by pouring 20 tons of washed rock salt into the pool saw the disintegration of the cast-iron heat exchanger and pump. (Note: Alex Rankin, a plumber working on the pool, recalled the incident in an Oral History Project undertaken by Hearst Castle in 1986. "Mr Hearst gave Mr Willicombe, his secretary an order; 'Put salt in the water'. I said, 'You can't put salt into this pool, the pipes are not designed for it'. He said, 'Mr Hearst wants salt water in the pool'. About a week later I see a big truck loaded right to the top with rock salt to put in the pool. The heater exchanger, where the copper tubes and steel comes together, it ate it all out. The pump broke and inside the cast iron was like cheese. You could cut it with a knife.") Inspiration for the mosaic decoration came from the Mausoleum of Galla Placidia in Ravenna. The tiles are of Murano glass, with gold-leaf, and were designed by Solon and manufactured in San Francisco. Although a pool of "spectacular beauty", it was little used being located in a less-visited part of the complex.

=== Pergola and zoo ===
Two other major features of the grounds were the pergola and the zoo. The pergola, an ornamental bridleway, runs to the west of Casa Grande. Comprising concrete columns, covered in espaliered fruit trees, Morgan ensured that it was built to a height sufficient to allow Hearst, "a tall man with a tall hat on a tall horse", to ride unimpeded down its mile-long length. Plans for a zoo, to house Hearst's large collection of wild animals, were drawn up by Morgan and included an elephant house and separate enclosures for antelopes, camels, zebras and bears. This was never constructed, but a range of shelters and pits were built, sited on Orchard Hill.

== Estate ==
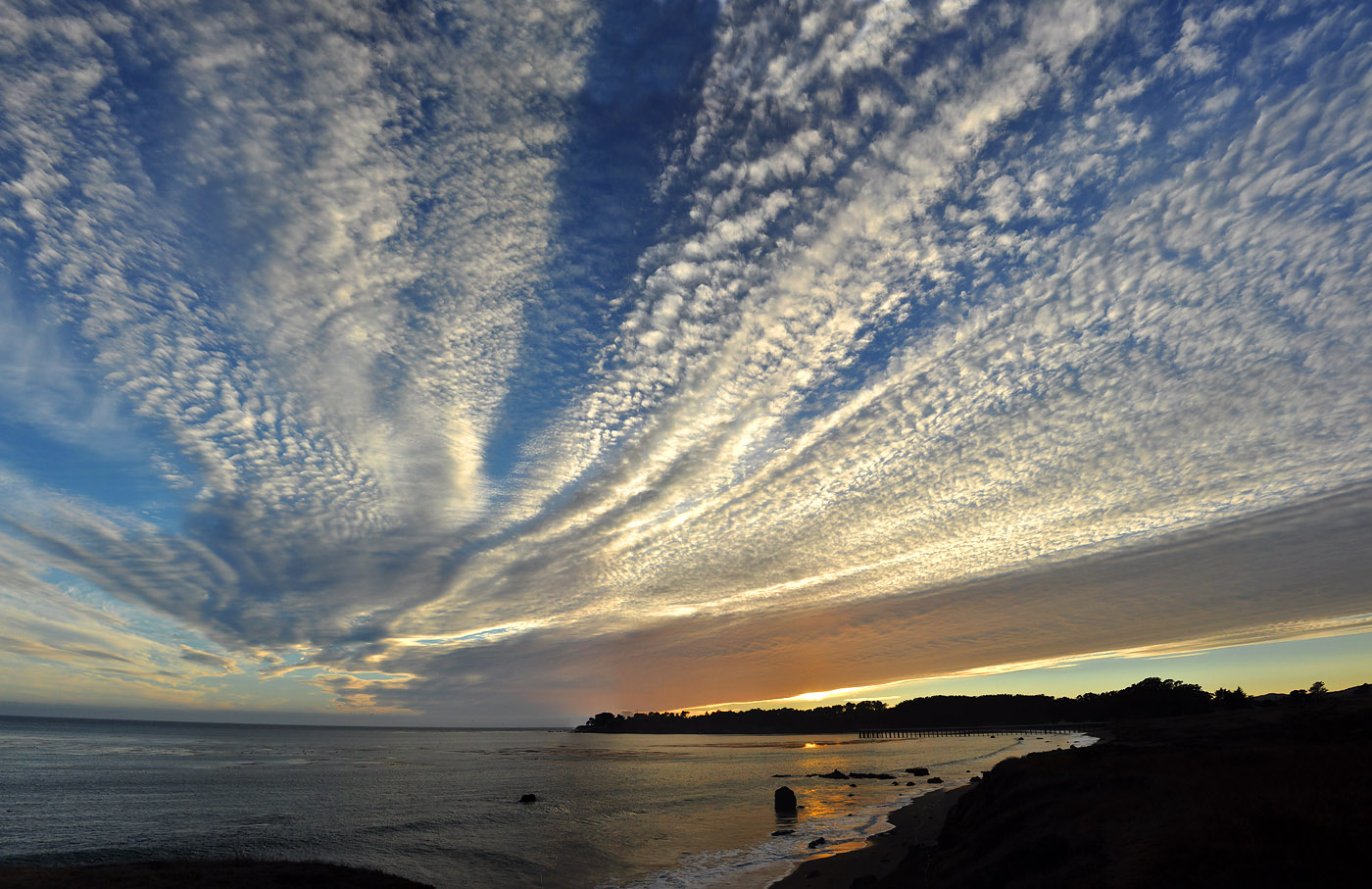
Sunset at San Simeon Bay

Hearst Castle is located near the town of San Simeon, California, approximately 250 mi (400 km) from both Los Angeles and San Francisco, and 43 mi (69 km) from San Luis Obispo at the northern end of San Luis Obispo County. The estate itself is five miles (eight km) inland atop a hill of the Santa Lucia Range at an altitude of 1,600 ft (490 m). The region is sparsely populated because the Santa Lucia Range abuts the Pacific Ocean, which provides dramatic vistas but offers few opportunities for development and hampers transportation. The surrounding countryside remains largely undeveloped. The castle's entrance is approximately five miles north of Hearst San Simeon State Park.

At the height of Hearst's ownership, the estate totaled more than 250,000 acres. W. C. Fields commented on the extent of the estate while on a visit; "Wonderful place to bring up children. You can send them out to play. They won't come back till they're grown". The gardens and terraces immediately surrounding the castle total roughly 22 acres (88305 sqm), [see plan]. Some 23 miles to the north of the castle, Morgan constructed the Milpitas Hacienda, a ranchhouse that acted as a trianon to the main estate, and as a focus for riding expeditions. In 1957, the castle and its contents, with 120 acres of the gardens, were transferred to the guardianship of the California State Parks Department. In 2005, the wider setting for the castle was protected by a conservation arrangement between the department, American Land Conservancy and the Hearst Corporation which aimed to preserve the undeveloped character of the coast. Years earlier, the writer Henry Miller had described the Big Sur area as "the California that men dreamed of ... the face of the earth as the Creator intended it to look". Miller's comment echoes an earlier observation on San Simeon made by Bernard Shaw; "This is what God would have built if he had had the money". (Note: The quote has also been recorded as Shaw's comment on St Donat's Castle, Hearst's genuine medieval castle in Wales. It has also been attributed to other people, among them Alexander Woollcott and George S. Kaufman, and to other places.) The agreement reached between the state and the family has not been without controversy. The deal, which saw the Hearst family receive $80 million in cash together with $15 million in state tax credits in exchange for ceding development rights on the majority of the estate, has been criticized as being too generous to the Hearsts, and for restricting public access to the estate. The deal's sponsors disagreed, Mike Chrisman, California's then Secretary for Resources, describing the agreement as "a landmark effort ... and a big deal for the state, for Hearst Corp. and the family and the public".

== Appreciation ==
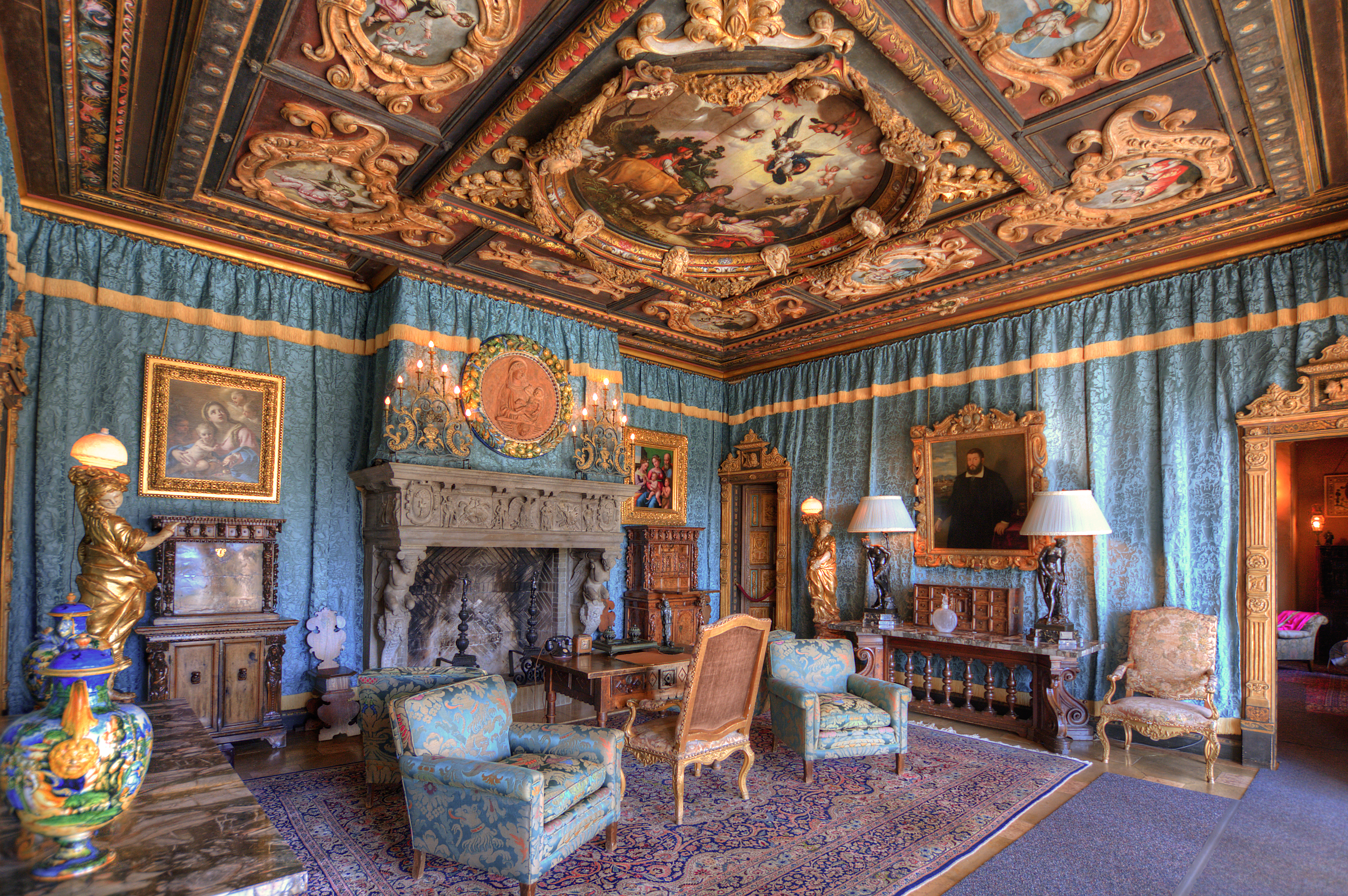
The sitting room in the Doge's Suite

As with Hearst himself, Hearst Castle and its collections have been the subject of considerable criticism. From the 1940s the view of Hearst and Morgan's most important joint creation as the phantasmagorical Xanadu of Orson Welles's imagination has been commonplace. Although some literary depictions were gently mocking; P. G. Wodehouse's novel of 1953, Ring for Jeeves, published in America in 1954 as The Return of Jeeves, has a character describe her stay, "I remember visiting at San Simeon once, and there was a whole French Abbey lying on the grass"; (Note: Wodehouse also recorded his impressions of his host. "There are two kinds of elderly American. One is mateyness itself. The other broods. It says little. Every now and then you catch its eye, and it is like colliding with a raw oyster. Mine host belongs to the latter class".) others were not. John Steinbeck's unnamed description was certainly of Hearst; "They's a fella, newspaper fella near the coast, got a million acres. Fat, sof' fella with little mean eyes an' a mouth like a ass-hole". The writer John Dos Passos went further, explicitly referencing Hearst in the third volume of his 1938 U.S.A trilogy. "The emperor of newsprint retired to his fief of San Simeon where he built an Andalusian palace and there spends his last years amid the relaxing adulations of screenstars, admen, screenwriters, publicity-men, columnists, Until he dies, a spent Caesar grown old with spending." The English architectural writer Clive Aslet was little more complimentary about the castle. Disliking its "unsympathetic texture (of) poured concrete", he described it as "best seen from a distance". The unfinished, and unresolved, rear façade of Casa Grande has been the subject of particular negative comment; Carleton Winslow and Nicola Frye, in their history from 1980, suggest the flanking north and south wings "compete rather disastrously" with the central doge's suite block. Others questioned the castle's very existence; the architect Witold Rybczynski asking, "what is this Italian villa doing on the Californian Coastal Range? ... a costly piece of theatrical décor that ignores its context (and) lacks meaning". Hearst's collections were similarly disparaged, the art historian William George Constable echoed Joseph Duveen when he assessed Hearst as "not a collector but a gigantic and voracious magpie".

Later decades after Hearst's death have seen a more sympathetic and appreciative evaluation of his collections, and the estate he and Morgan created to house them. The director of the Metropolitan Museum of Art, Thomas Hoving, although listing Hearst only at number 83 in his evaluation of America's top 101 art collectors, wrote, "Hearst is being reevaluated. He may have been much more of a collector than was thought at the time of his death". The curator Mary Levkoff, in her 2008 study, Hearst the Collector, contends that he was, describing the four separate "staggeringly important" collections of antique vases, tapestries, armor and silver which Hearst brought together, (Note: Hearst's collections of armor, assembled at sales during the 1920s and 1930s, were mainly housed at the armory he built at his penthouse in the Clarendon Building in New York, or at St Donat's Castle, and are not described here.) and writing of the challenge of bringing their artistic merit to light from under the shadow of his own reputation. (Note: Ms Levkoff, previously the Director of Sculpture and Decorative Arts at the National Gallery of Art was appointed Museum Director at Hearst Castle in 2014.) Of Morgan's building, its stock has risen with the re-evaluation of her standing and accomplishments, which saw her inducted into the California Hall of Fame in 2008, become the first woman to receive the American Institute of Architects Gold Medal in 2014, (Note: Morgan's nomination was supported by Dianne Feinstein, Maria Shriver, Michael Graves, Robert Venturi and Frank Gehry.) and to have an obituary in The New York Times as recently as 2019. (Note: Morgan shunned publicity, disliked being photographed particularly after an operation on her ear in 1932 left her face somewhat disfigured, and did not give press interviews, enter architectural competitions, or write articles publicizing her work. Dismissing these activities as suitable only for "talking architects" she wrote, "my buildings will be my legacy ... they will speak for me long after I'm gone".) The writer John Julius Norwich recorded his personal recantation after a visit to the castle; "I went prepared to mock; I remained to marvel. Hearst Castle (is) a palace in every sense of the word". Victoria Kastner, for many years the in-house historian of Hearst Castle and author of a number of books on its design and history, concludes her history of the castle with an assessment of San Simeon as "the quintessential twentieth-century American country house".

== See also ==
- List of works by Julia Morgan
- List of largest houses in the United States

== Sources ==
- Aidala, Thomas (1984). Hearst Castle: San Simeon. New York: Harrison House. OCLC 731420004.
- Aslet, Clive (1982). The Last Country Houses. New Haven, US and London: Yale University Press. ISBN 978-0-300-02904-8.
- — (1990). The American Country House. New York: Yale University Press. ISBN 978-0-300-04757-8. OCLC 22342371.
- Blomberg, Nancy J. (1988). Navajo Textiles: The William Randolph Hearst Collection. Tucson, Arizona: University of Arizona Press. ISBN 978-0-8165-1467-0.
- von Bothmer, Dietrich (March 1957). "Greek Vases from the Hearst Collection". The Metropolitan Museum of Art Bulletin (March 1957): 165–180.
- Boutelle, Sarah Holmes (1995). Julia Morgan: Architect. New York, London: Abbeville Press. ISBN 978-0-789-20019-8. OCLC 877447659.
- Burt, Nathaniel (1977). Palaces for the People: A Social History of the American Art Museum. Boston: Little, Brown and Company. ISBN 978-0-316-11785-2.
- Carringer, Robert L. (1985). The Making of Citizen Kane. Berkeley, California: University of California Press. ISBN 978-0-520-20567-3. OCLC 925334492.
- Churchill, Winston; Churchill, Clementine (1998). Mary Soames (ed.). Speaking For Themselves: The Personal Letters of Winston and Clementine Churchill. London: Doubleday. ISBN 0385406916.
- Clarke, Peter (2012). Mr Churchill's Profession: Statesman, Orator, Writer. London: Bloomsbury Publishing. ISBN 978-1-408-81887-9. OCLC 813834249.
- Coffman, Taylor (1985). Hearst Castle: The Story of William Randolph Hearst and San Simeon. Santa Barbara, California: Sequoia Communications. ISBN 978-0-866-79022-2. OCLC 886313320.
- Constable, William George (1964). Art collecting in the United States of America: An outline of a history. London: Thomas Nelson. OCLC 804260639.
- Crabtree, Cheryl (2011). Northern California 2011. El Segundo, California: Fodor's. ISBN 978-1-400-00503-1.
- Eargle, Dolan H. (2008). Native California: An Introductory Guide to the Original Peoples From Earliest to Modern Times. San Francisco: Trees Company Press. ISBN 978-0-937-40111-8.
- Everingham, Carol J. (1981). The Art of San Simeon: Introduction to the Collection. Santa Barbara, California: Haagen Printing. ISBN 978-0-960-69960-5.
- Fourie, Denise; Trujillo, Catherine (2008). "Guide to the Camille Solon Drawings Collection: 1900–1952". California Polytechnic State University.
- Gellner, Arrol; Keister, Douglas (2002). Red Tile Style: America's Spanish revival architecture. New York: Viking Press. ISBN 978-0-670-03050-7.
- Gilbert, Martin (1976). Winston S. Churchill 1922–1939. Authorised biography of Winston S. Churchill. Vol. V. London: Heinemann. OCLC 715481469.
- Harris, John (2007). Moving Rooms: The Trade in Architectural Salvages. New Haven, US and London: Yale University Press. ISBN 978-0-300-12420-0.
- Hewitt, Mark Alan (1990). The Architect & the American Country House: 1890-1940. New Haven, US and London: Yale University Press. ISBN 978-0-300-04740-0. OCLC 442679431.
- Higham, Charles (1971). The Films of Orson Welles. Berkeley, California: University of California Press. ISBN 978-0-520-02048-1.
- Houseman, John (1972). Run-Through: A Memoir. New York: Simon & Schuster. OCLC 463094615.
- Kastner, Victoria (2000). Hearst Castle: The Biography of a Country House. New York: Abrams Books. ISBN 978-0-810-93415-3. OCLC 906879446.
- — (2009). Hearst's San Simeon: The Gardens and the Land. New York: Abrams Books. ISBN 978-0-810-97290-2.
- Larkin, Catherine (2015). The William Randolph Hearst Archive: An Emerging Opportunity for Digital Art Research and Scholarship (PDF). Long Island, New York: Long Island University.
- Levkoff, Mary L. (2008). Hearst the Collector. New York: Abrams Books. ISBN 978-0-810-97283-4. OCLC 804275809.
- Loe, Nancy E. (1991). Hearst Castle: The Official Pictorial Guide. San Rafael, California: Aramack. ISBN 978-0-944-19714-1.
- — (1994). Hearst Castle: An Interpretative History of W. R. Hearst's San Simeon Estate. Santa Barbara, California: Companion Press. ISBN 978-0-944-19746-2. OCLC 750727216.
- Lough, David (2015). No More Champagne: Churchill and His Money. London: Head of Zeus Ltd. ISBN 978-1-784-08182-9.
- Marter, Joan M. (2011). The Grove Encyclopedia of American Art. Oxford, UK: Oxford University Press. ISBN 978-0-195-33579-8.
- McBride, Joseph (2013). What Ever Happened to Orson Welles? A Portrait of an Independent Career. Lexington, Kentucky: University Press of Kentucky. ISBN 978-0-81314-595-2.
- McMurry, Enfys (1999). Hearst's Other Castle. Bridgend, Wales: Seren Press. ISBN 978-1-854-11228-6. OCLC 41396927.
- Mendoza, Ruben G. (2021). The Spanish Style House: From Enchanted Andalusia to the Californian Dream. New York: Rizzoli. ISBN 978-0-847-86516-1. OCLC 1143615933.
- de Moubray, Amicia (2013). Twentieth Century Castles in Britain. London: Frances Lincoln Publishers. ISBN 978-0-711-23178-8.
- Murray, Ken (1995). The Golden Days of San Simeon. Los Angeles: Murmar Publishing. ISBN 978-0-385-04632-9.
- Nasaw, David (2001). The Chief: The Life of William Randolph Hearst. Boston: Houghton Mifflin Harcourt. ISBN 978-0-618-15446-3.
- Norwich, John Julius (1993). Great Residences: Illustrated Perspectives on Power, Wealth and Prestige. London: Mitchell Beazley. ISBN 978-1-857-32082-4. OCLC 29596614.
- Pizzitola, Louis (2002). Hearst over Hollywood: power, passion, and propaganda in the movies. New York: Columbia University Press. p. 430. ISBN 978-0-231-11646-6. "Patricia Van Cleve, Hearst."
- Polyzoides, Stefanos; Sherwood, Roger; Tice, James (1992). Courtyard Housing in Los Angeles. New York: Princeton Architectural Press. ISBN 978-0-910-41353-4.
- Procter, Ben (2007). William Randolph Hearst: The Later Years, 1911–1951. New York: Oxford University Press. ISBN 978-0-195-32534-8.
- Rybczynski, Witold (1989). The Most Beautiful House in the World. New York: Viking Press. ISBN 978-0-670-81981-2.
- Steinbeck, John (1939). The Grapes of Wrath. New York: Viking Press. OCLC 981334514.
- Thorndike Jr., Joseph J. (1978). The Magnificent Builders and their Dream Houses. New York: American Heritage Publishing Company. ISBN 978-0-828-13064-6.
- Wadsworth, Ginger (1990). Julia Morgan: Architect of Dreams. Minneapolis: Lerner Publications Company. ISBN 978-0-822-54903-1.
- Wiencek, Henry; Lucey, Donna M. (1999). America's Great Houses. Washington: National Geographic Society. ISBN 978-0-792-27424-7. OCLC 40609228.
- Wilson, Mark Anthony (2012). Julia Morgan: Architect of Beauty. Layton, Utah: Gibbs Smith. ISBN 978-1-423-63654-0. OCLC 966008538.
- Winslow, Carleton M.; Frye, Nikola L. (1980). The Enchanted Hill: The Story of Hearst Castle at San Simeon. Los Angeles: Rosebud Books. ISBN 978-0-865-58003-9. OCLC 718340532.
- Wodehouse, P. G. (1983). P. G. Wodehouse: Five Complete Novels. New York: Avenel Books. ISBN 978-0-517-40538-3.
