= Hirst (surname) =

- Language: English

Origin
- Language: English
- Meaning: Someone who lived on a wooded hill
- Region of origin: England

Other names
- Variant forms: Hurst, Herst, Hearst

Hirst is an English surname. Notable people with the surname include:

- Amos Brook Hirst, English football administrator
- Arthur Stanley Hirst (1883–1930), British entomologist
- Barton Cooke Hirst (1861–1935), American obstetrician
- Ben Hirst (born 1997), English footballer
- Bob Hirst (1941–2008), Australian rules footballer
- Byron Hirst (1912–2002), American lawyer and politician from Wyoming
- Christopher Hirst (born 1947), British cricketer and educator
- Claude Raguet Hirst (1855–1942), American painter
- Damien Hirst (born 1965), English artist
- David Hirst (arachnologist), Australian huntsman spider expert
- David Hirst (footballer) (born 1967), English footballer and coach
- David Hirst (journalist) (1936–2025), British journalist based in the Middle East
- David Hirst (judge) (1925–2011), British Lord Justice of Appeal
- Derek Hirst (born 1948), British historian
- Edmund Hirst (1898–1975), British chemist
- Edward Hirst (1857–1914), British cricketer
- Elín Hirst (born 1960), Icelandic politician
- Emily Hirst (born 1993), Canadian actress
- Ernest Hirst (1855–1933), British cricketer
- Francis Hirst (1873–1953), British journalist and editor of The Economist
- Geoffrey Hirst (1904–1984), British industrialist and politician
- Georgia Hirst (born 1994), English actress
- George Hirst (1871–1954), English cricketer
- George Hirst (footballer) (born 1999), English footballer
- George Hirst (rugby league) (born 2001), English rugby league footballer
- George Hirst (virologist) (1909–1994), American virologist
- George Harry Hirst (1879–1933), British politician
- George Littlewood Hirst (1890–1967), Welsh rugby union footballer
- G. M. Hirst (1869–1962), English-American classicist
- Grace Hirst (1805–1901), New Zealand businesswoman
- Henry Hirst (1838–1911), New Zealand politician
- Henry Beck Hirst (1813–1874), American poet
- Hugo Hirst, 1st Baron Hirst (1863–1943), British industrialist
- Ian Hirst (born 1989), Irish rugby union footballer
- Irene Hirst (1930–2000), British gymnast
- Ivan Hirst (1916–2000), British Army officer in post-war Germany
- Jack Hirst (rugby league, born c. 1900), British rugby league footballer
- Jack Hirst (rugby league, born c. 1936) (c.1936–2012), British rugby league footballer
- Jacqueline Suthren Hirst, British religious studies academic
- Jake Hirst (baseball), American baseball coach
- Jake Hirst (footballer) (born 1996), English footballer
- Jane Hirst, Australian academic obstetrician
- Jeff Hirst (born 1963), Canadian diver
- Jemmy Hirst (1738–1829), English eccentric
- Klasey Hirst, Australian politician
- Joe Hirst (born 1987), British rugby league footballer
- Joseph Hirst (1863–1945), British architect
- John Hirst (businessman) (born 1947), British businessman, Chief Executive of the UK Meteorological Office
- John Hirst (criminal) (born 1950), British killer and campaigner for prisoners' rights
- John Hirst (historian) (1942–2016), Australian historian
- John Henry Hirst (1826–1882), English architect
- John Malcolm Hirst (1921–1997), British aerobiologist, agricultural botanist, and mycologist
- Joseph Hirst (1863–1945), English architect
- Judy Hirst, British biologist
- Kenneth Hirst (1940–2008), British rugby union and rugby league footballer
- Keegan Hirst (born 1988), British rugby league footballer
- Larry Hirst (born 1951), British businessman
- Leslie Hirst, English rugby league footballer of the 1940s and 1950s
- Linda S. Hirst, British and American physicist
- Malcolm Hirst (born 1945), British biathlete
- Marie Boaze Hirst, married name Marie Hirst Yochim (1920–2012), American lineage society leader
- Mark Hirst, British journalist
- Maude Hirst (born 1988), English actress
- Michael Hirst (art historian) (1933–2017), British art historian.
- Michael Hirst (politician) (born 1946), Scottish politician
- Michael Hirst (writer) (born 1952), English screenwriter and producer
- Miss Hirst (fl.1850–1870s), early New Zealand astronomical observer
- Nicky Hirst (born 1963), English sculptor and artist
- Olive Hirst (1912–1994), English advertising agent
- Omer L. Hirst (1915–2003) was an American real estate broker and politician from Virginia
- Pat Hirst (1918–1996), British gymnast
- Paul Hirst (1946–2003), British sociologist
- Rachel Hirst (born 1965), British rower
- Rob Hirst (1956–2026), Australian musician
- Robert Hirst (sailor) (born 1971), British Virgin Islands competitive sailor
- Roger Hirst (born 1960), English politician
- Sam Hirst (1875–1937), English cricketer
- Shakespeare Hirst (1841–1907), British actor and author
- Sophie Hirst (born 2000), American soccer player
- Stanley Hirst (trade unionist) (1876–1950), British trade unionist
- Shari Decter Hirst, Canadian politician
- Stephanie Hirst (born 1975), British radio and television presenter
- Terry Hirst (1932–2015), British-Kenyan cartoonist
- Thomas Hirst (1865–1927), British cricketer
- Thomas Archer Hirst (1830–1892), British mathematician
- Tilly Hirst (1941–2021), New Zealand netball player
- Tony Hirst (born 1967), British actor and stage director
- Tony Hirst (blogger), British academic and blogger
- Tony Hirst (footballer) (born 1945), Australian rules footballer
- Ursula Hirst (1909–2002), British actress
- William Hirst (1873–1946), British politician

== See also ==
- Hirst (disambiguation)
- Hearst (surname)
- Hurst (surname)
