= Hurst (surname) =

Hurst is a surname. As of May 2021, in the United States, there are 55,172 people with this last name making it the 702nd most popular last name. Notable people with the surname include:

- Alan Hurst (politician) (1945–2023), British politician
- Alan Hurst (cricketer) (born 1950), former Australian cricketer
- Alfred Hurst (1846–1915), English-born American politician and businessman
- Brandon Hurst (1866–1947), English actor
- Brian Desmond Hurst (1895–1986), Irish film director
- Bruce Hurst (born 1958), Major League Baseball pitcher
- Charles Angas Hurst (1923–2011), Australian Mathematical Physicist
- Charles Chamberlain Hurst (1870–1947), British Mendelian geneticist and botanist
- Demontre Hurst (born 1991), American football player
- David Hurst (1926–2019), German actor
- David W. Hurst (c. 1820s–1882), justice of the Supreme Court of Mississippi
- Denfield Hurst (born 1910), Antiguan politician
- Emma Hurst (born 1981), Australia federal politician
- Fannie Hurst (1889–1968), American novelist
- Fielding Hurst (1810-1882), American landowner, military commander and politician
- Geoff Hurst (born 1941), English footballer
- George Samuel Hurst (1927–2010), American health physicist and inventor, touchscreen pioneer
- Glynn Hurst (born 1976), professional footballer
- Greg Hurst, Scottish footballer
- Harold Edwin Hurst (1880–1978), British hydrologist
- Hayden Hurst (born 1993), American football player
- James Hurst (disambiguation)
  - James Hurst, a short story writer of "The Scarlet Ibis"
  - James Hurst (baseball) (born 1967), Major League Baseball player
  - Jim Hurst, American guitarist
- John Hurst (disambiguation), multiple people
- Jonny Hurst (born 1966), England's first Chant Laureate
- Kevan Hurst (born 1985), footballer
- Lee Hurst (born 1962), comedian
- Lee Hurst (footballer) (born 1970), English football midfielder
- Lillian Hurst (born 1943), Puerto Rican actress and comedian
- Margery Hurst (1913–1989), British businesswoman
- Maurice Hurst (cornerback) (born 1967), American football player
  - His son, Maurice Hurst Jr. (born 1995), American football player
- Maurice Hurst (architect) (1929–2003), Australian architect
- Michael Hurst (born 1957), actor, director and writer
- Mike Hurst (politician) (born 1950), Canadian politician
- Mike Hurst (producer) (born 1942), British singer and record producer
- Murray Hurst, former coach of the North Queensland Cowboys
- Pat Hurst (born 1969), American golfer
- Paul Hurst (born 1974), English footballer
- Paul Hurst (actor) (1888–1953), American film actor and director
- Rick Hurst (1946–2025), American actor
- Robert Hurst (disambiguation), various including:
  - Robert Hurst (broadcaster), president of CTV News
- Ryan Hurst (born 1976), American actor
- Ted Hurst (born 2004), American football player
- Trevor Hurst, lead singer of Econoline Crush
- William Hurst (disambiguation)

== See also ==
- Hearst (surname)
- Hirst (surname)
- Horst (disambiguation)
