= Hurst =

Hurst may refer to:

== Places ==
=== England ===
- Hurst, Berkshire, a village
- Hurst, Cumbria, a location
- Hurst, Dorset, a location
- Hurst, Greater Manchester, a location
- Hurst, North Yorkshire, a hamlet
- Hurst, Somerset, a settlement within the village of Martock
- Hurst Spit, a shingle spit in Hampshire
  - Hurst Castle
- Hurst Hill, Lancashire
- Hurst Reservoir, a disused reservoir near Glossop, north Derbyshire

=== United States ===
- Hurst, Illinois, a city
- Hurst, Missouri, a ghost town
- Hurst, Texas, a city
- Hurst, West Virginia, an unincorporated community

=== Antarctica ===
- Hurst Peak, Ellsworth Land
- Hurst Bay, James Ross Island

== Schools ==
- The Hurst School, Baughurst, Hampshire, England
- Hurst High School, Norvelt, Pennsylvania, United States
- Hurst Junior High School, Hurst, Texas, United States

== Other uses ==
- Hurst (surname)
- C. Hurst & Co., British publishing company
- USS Hurst, the name of more than one United States Navy ship
- Hurst Street, Birmingham, England
- Ashton United F.C., an English football club founded as Hurst F.C. in 1878
- Hurst Fire, a wildfire that burned in California as part of the January 2025 Southern California wildfires

== See also ==
- Hurst exponent
- Hurst Performance, products for automobiles
- Hearst (disambiguation)
- Herst (disambiguation)
- Hirst (disambiguation)
- Horst (disambiguation)
