= James Hurst =

James Hurst may refer to:

- James Hurst (author) (1922–2013), author of "The Scarlet Ibis"
- James Hurst (politician) (1880–1964), Tasmanian politician
- James Hurst (footballer) (born 1992), English footballer
- James Hurst (baseball) (born 1967), former Major League Baseball pitcher
- James Hurst (American football) (born 1991), American football offensive tackle
- James Willard Hurst (1910–1997), American legal history scholar
- James Hurst (screenwriter), Canadian television producer and writer
- Jim Hurst, American guitarist

== See also ==
- Hurst (disambiguation)
