= Hindu mythology =

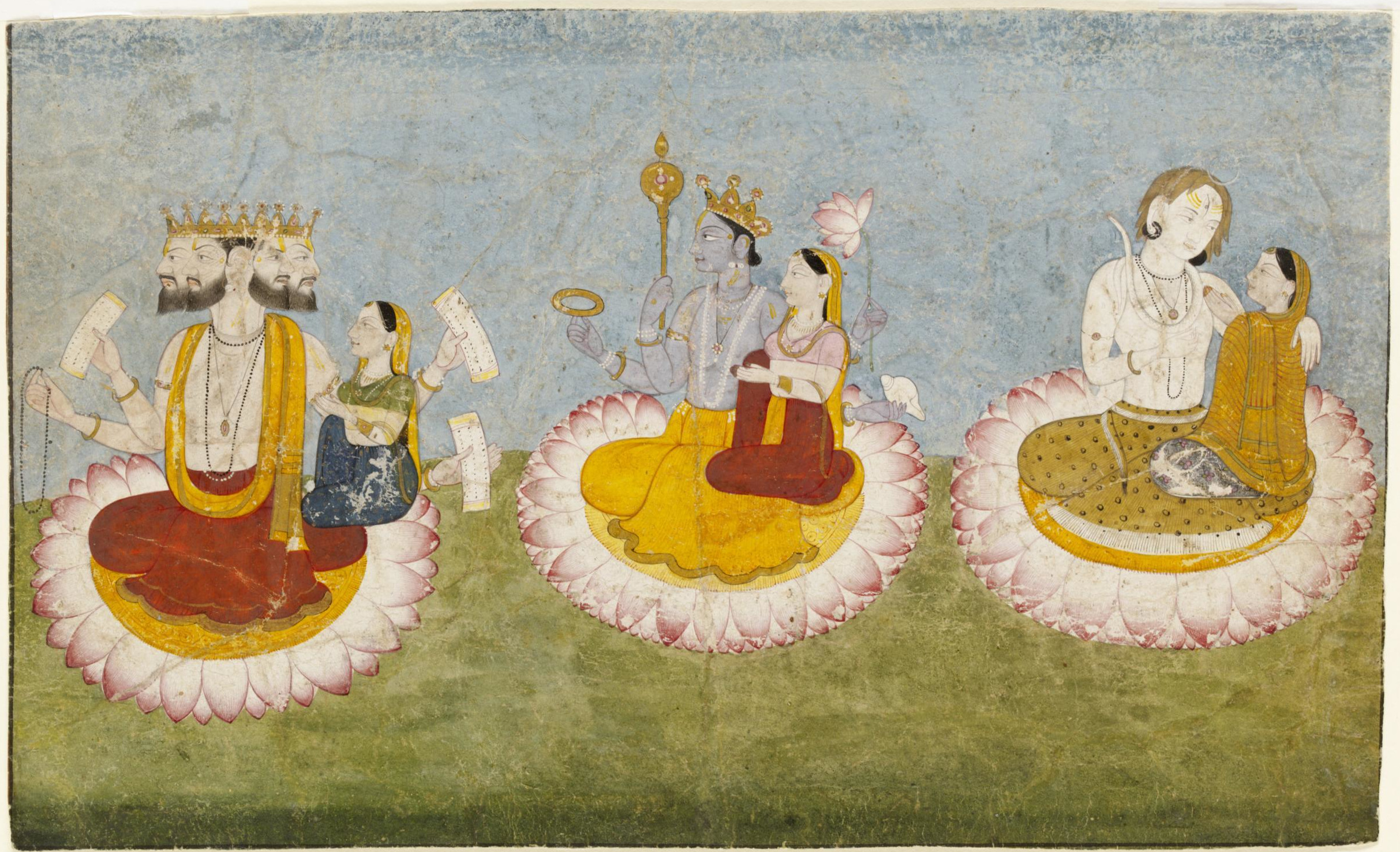
The Trimurti (Brahma, Vishnu, and Shiva) seated on lotuses with their consorts, the Tridevi (Saraswati, Lakshmi, and Parvati).

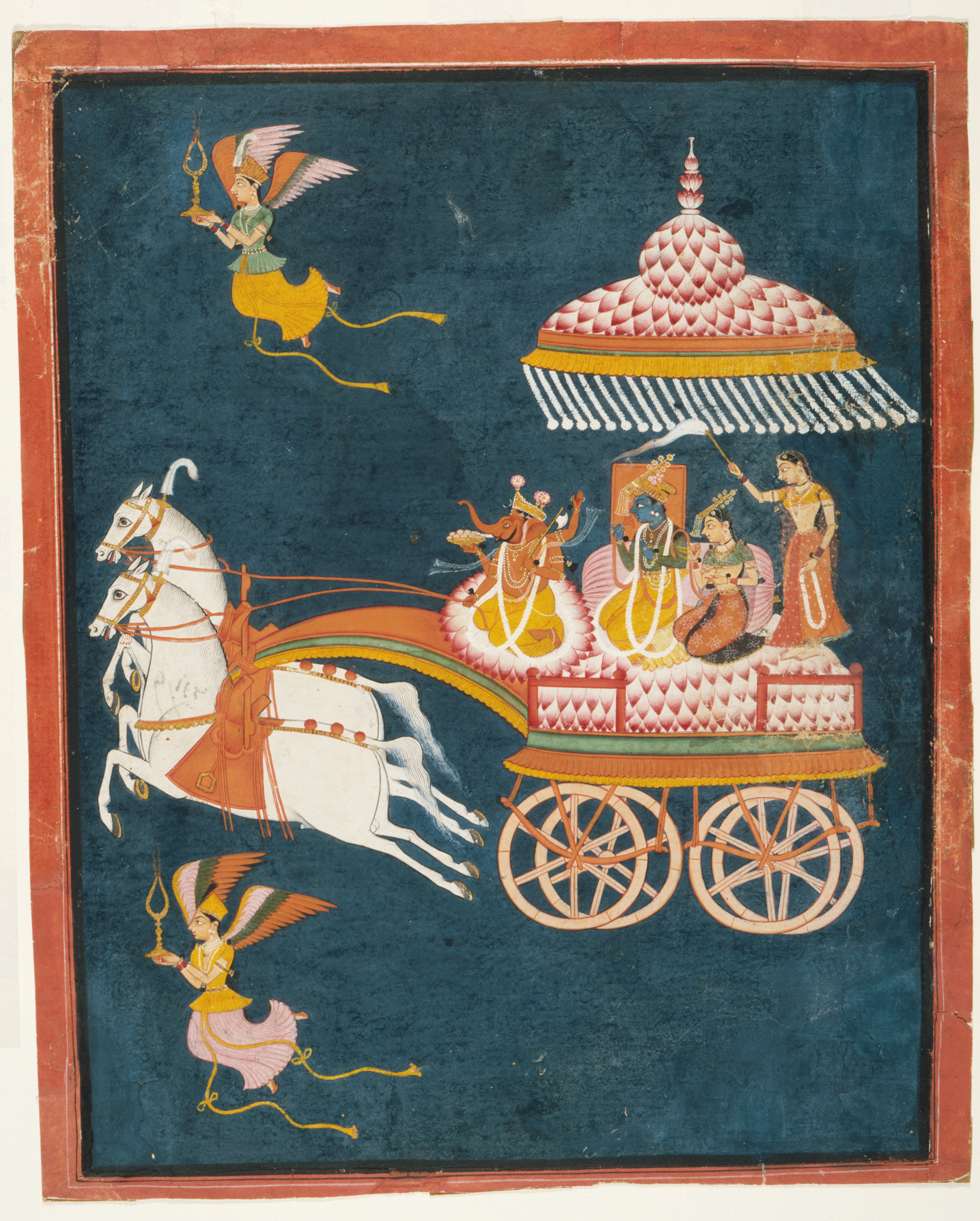
Krishna elopes with Princess Rukmini

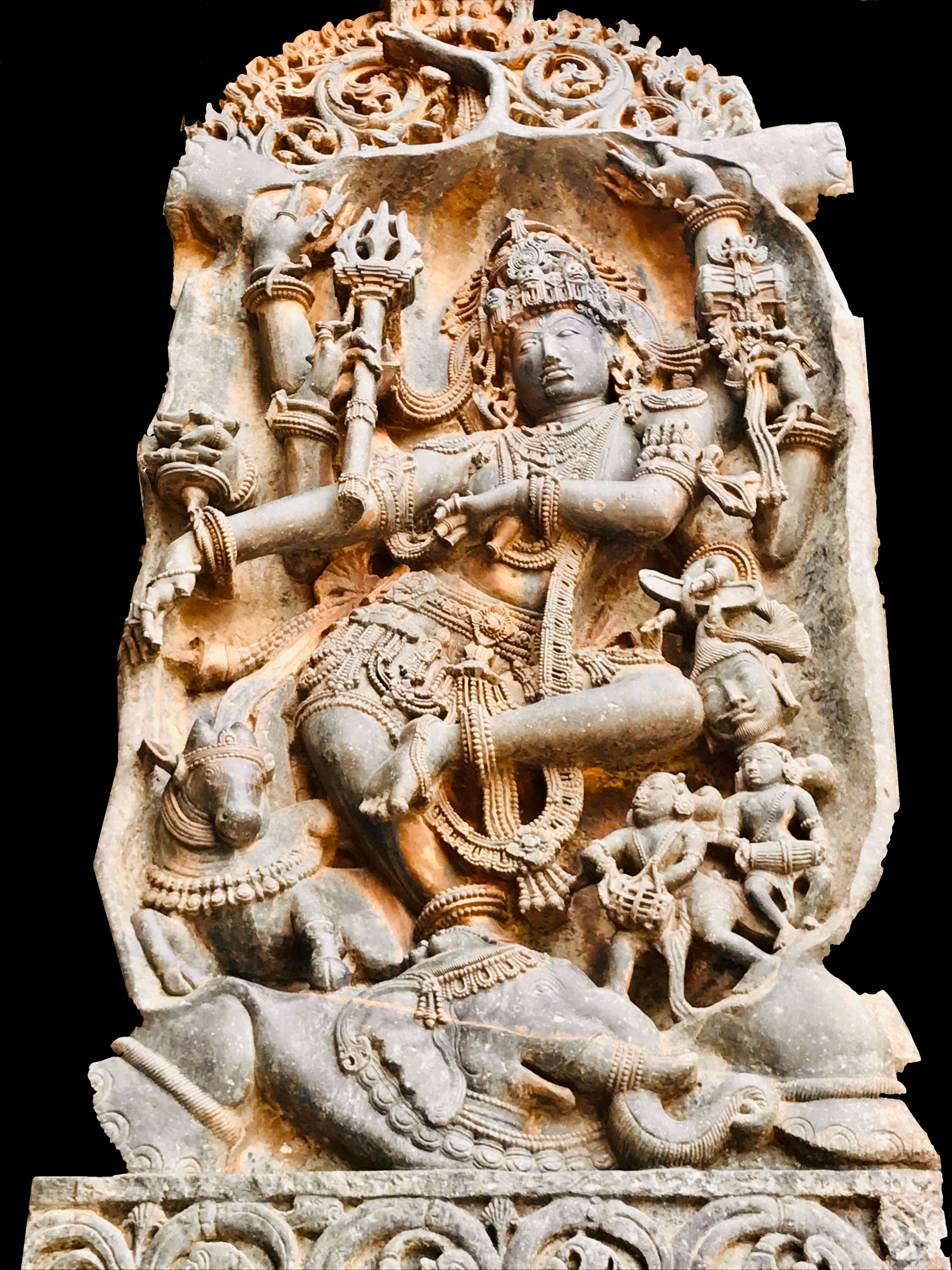
Shiva slays Gajasura

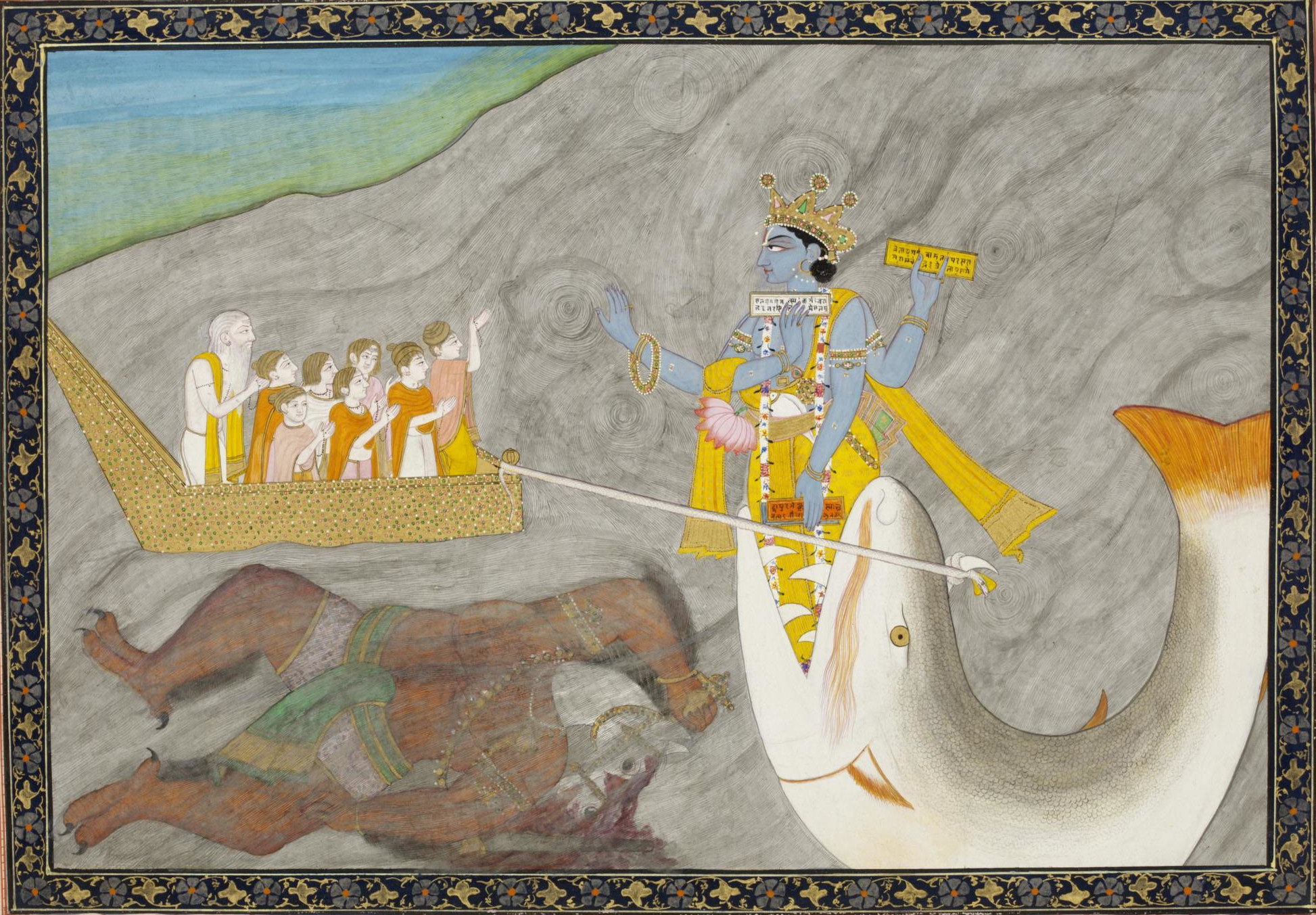
Vishnu's Matsya avatar, a prominent Hindu myth.

Hindu mythology refers to the collection of myths (Note: The term myth is used here in its academic sense, meaning "a traditional story consisting of events that are ostensibly historical, though often supernatural, explaining the origins of a cultural practice or natural phenomenon". It is not being used to mean "something that is false".) associated with Hinduism, derived from various Hindu texts and traditions. These myths are found in sacred texts such as the Vedas, the Itihasas (the Mahabharata and the Ramayana), and the Puranas. They also appear in regional and ethnolinguistic texts, including the Bengali Mangal Kavya and the Tamil Periya Puranam and Divya Prabandham. Additionally, Hindu myths are found in widely translated fables like the Panchatantra and the Hitopadesha, as well as in Southeast Asian texts influenced by Hindu traditions.

== Meaning of "myth" ==
Myth is an etic (foreign, outsider) term relative to Hinduism. "Myth" describes a genre of folklore or theology consisting primarily of narratives that play a fundamental role in a society, such as foundational tales or origin myths. For folklorists, historians, philosophers or theologians this is very different from the use of "myth" simply indicating that something is not true. Instead, the truth value of a myth is not a defining criterion.

== Origins and development ==
=== Indus Valley Civilisation ===
Scholars do not know if the Indus Valley Civilisation (3300–1300 BCE, mature form 2600–1900 BCE) left traces in the beliefs and traditions of Hinduism. Some scholars, such as Joseph Campbell, argued that artefacts have revealed motifs that are also employed and revered by Hindus today, such as primary male deities worshipped by a ruling elite, mother goddesses, nature spirits, snake worship, as well as the reverence of other theriomorphic (animal-shaped) beings. But more recent scholars have suggested that links between Hindu myths and the Indus Civilization are unproven and that we know little about religion in the Indus Valley Civilization.

=== Vedic tradition ===
==== Vedic period ====
The term Veda signifies knowledge that was "heard" (shruti) or orally communicated to Vedic sages known as Rishis. The pantheon of this religion focuses on the personification of natural forces, governed by a "Vedic Triad" of supreme deities: Agni, Indra and Surya.

The Rigveda contains praise verses to the gods. The Yajurveda provides the mantras for sacrificial rites. The Samaveda arranges its verses as songs to be melodically chanted. The Atharvaveda collects spells, curses, and healing incantations. The use of physical images of gods likely came only in later centuries.

In the Vedic pantheon, three gods stood above all others: Agni, Indra, and Surya:

- Indra was the most popular deity of the Vedic age, the god of the firmament who wields the thunderbolt and commands the refreshing showers that make the earth fruitful. People celebrate Indra as a fearsome warrior because he killed Vritra, a demon who caused drought by blocking the waters. Killing Vritra released the "sky waters" down to earth. Those waters watered the dry soil and made it good for farming again.
- Agni is the messenger who travels between gods and humans. But he is not just a go-between. The myths say he stays in every home, and people there treat him like an honored guest who has come to visit.
- Surya is often called the one who gives life to everything. According to the myths, he travels across the sky in a fiery chariot. His light drives out darkness, and it also stirs up human thought and understanding.The Gayatri Mantra, which is considered one of the most spiritually charged and revered verses in all of Hinduism, praises Surya. The mantra speaks directly to his magnificent, shining glory.

There were many other divine figures, responsible for keeping the universe in order and for preserving justice and morality throughout creation.

- Varuna: He witnessed every human truth and every concealed falsehood. This ability came with his rise to the top and he was known as "all-knowing asura" - the position of supreme ruler over all creation. His earlier form in the myths was much simpler as a god of light. He was later associated with the regulation of both celestial and terrestrial waters.
- Usha: Usha represents the first light of morning. The oldest Hindu poems describe her in glowing termed as "golden goddess." She is the daughter of the Sky. No other deity in Vedic literature is painted with such tender beauty. People praise her for two reasons. She wakes the living from sleep, which the hymns call a form of death. And she gets the road ready for Surya to make his journey.
- Aditi: Aditi is the mother of the gods known as the Adityas. Her name means boundless. She represents the infinite, never-ending space of the heavens. Her importance comes from her symbolic meanings. She is a figure of motherhood, of conscious awareness, and of a life untouched by suffering.
- Soma: Soma plays two roles: he is both a god and a juice pressed from a plant that makes people feel intoxicated. Vedic rituals could not be performed without this juice. The Vedic people thought Soma could make the gods immortal. Later on, they also started identifying him with the Moon.

==== Brahmanical period ====
This period saw the composition of the Brahmanas, a collection of prose commentaries containing detailed explanations and applications of ritualistic sacrifices. During this time, Vedic ritual developed into a complex sacrificial system requiring specialized priests. Major ceremonies included the horse sacrifice (ashvamedha) and Soma sacrifice. Prajapati emerged as an important creator god of the Brahmanas, while Agni served as the medium through whom sacrificial offerings were made to the gods.

==== Upanishads ====
The oldest Upanishads, composed in northern India, are not primarily mythological narratives, but philosophical and religious texts, which elaborate on the Vedic ritual, exploring the hidden connections between the Vedic rituals, "the cosmic realities", and the human body and person. The Upanishads were composed after the Vedas, and, like the Vedas, the oldest Upanishads were preserved through oral transmission for centuries before being written down.

The early Upanishads mark "the transition from the archaic ritualism of the Veda into new religious ideas and institutions", and major Hindu concepts such as atman, brahman, karma, reincarnation, and liberation were first formulated in these texts. Yet, the Brahmanas and Upanishads also show continuity through textual devices and a similar "idiom"; karma, for example, originally signified ritual action.

Wilkins, citing Monier-Williams, describes Brahman as the "universally expanding essence" or "universally diffused substance" or a "simple infinite being" and relates it to divine manifestations such as Brahma, Vishnu, and Shiva.

==== Key figures ====
Yajnavalkya is major sage of the Brihadaranyaka Upanishad and one of the most important philosophical figures in early Hindu thought. In the text he articulates through various conversations key ideas about the self, karma, rebirth, liberation, Brahman, and Atman.

=== Sramanic movements ===
Elements such as those emerging from Buddhism and Jainism made their contributions to later Hindu mythology, such as temples, indoor shrines, and rituals modeled after service to a divine king. Renunciate traditions contributed elements that questioned sacrifices and the killing of animals, and promoted asceticism and vegetarianism. All of these themes would be incorporated by the Brahmin classes into the later Hindu synthesis, which developed in response to the sramanic movements between ca. 500–300 BCE and 500 CE, and also found their way into Hindu mythology.

=== Classical period ===
This period saw the development of the Hindu synthesis, the syncretization of local traditions with a nominal adherence to Brahmanical orthodoxy.

==== The epics ====
The epics depict gods with human-like qualities, and also emphasize avatars. The belief was that Vishnu descends to earth in human or animal shape when morality declines. He comes to restore dharma, or the right order of things.

===== The Ramayana: The Quest of Rama =====
The Ramayana, traditionally attributed to Valmiki, has about 24,000 verses. It narrates the story of Prince Rama of Ayodhya, who is sent into exile in the forest. There, the demon king Ravana kidnaps his wife Sita and takes her to Lanka. Rama goes to rescue her.

Hindus consider Rama to be an avatar of Vishnu in human form. Sita is seen as the goddess Lakshmi born as a woman. The Ramayana is an important moral guide. Rama represents the perfect man. Sita represents the perfect wife devoted and loyal.

===== The Mahabharata: The Great Dynasty =====
The Mahabharata is among the longest literary works ever created seven times the length of the Iliad and Odyssey combined. It tells of a struggle between five Pandava cousins and one hundred Kaurava cousins. Their battle between right and wrong culminates in a massive war. The sage Vyasa is credited with the epic. Tradition says he dictated it while the elephant-headed god Ganesha wrote it down using one of his own tusks as a pen.

Two notable texts associated with Mahabharata are:

- The Bhagavad Gita: A conversation between the warrior Arjuna and his chariot driver Krishna (Vishnu's eighth avatar) right before a massive battle. It explores duty, the soul, and the cosmic fight between good and evil.
- The Harivamsa: An appendix that records royal family trees and provides the main mythological stories about Krishna's life and deeds.

==== Puranas ====
The word "Purana" means "old story" or "ancient tale." Between roughly 250 and 1500 CE, dozens of these texts were written down. Some lists say there are eighteen major ones; others add eighteen minor ones. But the exact number matters less than what these books represented.

Unlike the Vedas, which were dense collections of hymns and sacrificial formulas, the Puranas were composed in narrative form. They included folk tales that grandmothers told children. They traced the family trees of kings and heroes. They retold episodes from the Ramayana and Mahabharata but added new twists and characters. A farmer in a village who could not read a single word of the Vedas could still sit by a fire at night and listen to a Puranic storyteller describe how Krishna lifted a mountain on one finger or how Durga rode a lion into battle against a buffalo demon.

In this period, three main non-Vedic traditions developed: Vaishnavas (followers of Vishnu), Shaivas (followers of Shiva), and Shaktas (followers of Devi). Each group's Puranas declared their own deity as supreme. A Vaishnava text would call Vishnu the source of everything, while a Shaiva text would say the same for Shiva, treating other gods as lesser beings.

The Puranas also developed the idea of the Trimurti - Brahma the creator, Vishnu the preserver, and Shiva the destroyer. Alongside them stood the Tridevi: Saraswati, Lakshmi, and Parvati. These goddesses represented Shakti, the feminine energy that made the male gods active and powerful.

The Puranas pushed the older Vedic gods down the hierarchy. While Indra, Agni, and Surya were prime deities in the Vedic tradition, they were incorporated as secondary figures living in lower heavens in the developing Hindu synthesis. In story after story, Indra comes across as a flawed king. He is proud, fearful, or both. Demons keep stealing his throne, and he has to beg Vishnu or Shiva to save him.

=== Tantric period ===
The Tantric period (c. 900-1600 CE) represents a major development in Hindu mythology characterized by the composition of Tantras, which were often regarded by their followers as a "fifth Veda." These scriptures are typically presented as a dialogue between the god Shiva and his consort, Parvati, and serve as the primary authority for the shaktas, or worshippers of the Divine Mother. This era emphasized Shaktism, the belief that Shakti (cosmic energy) is the supreme manifestation of the ultimate reality, animating and balancing the power of male deities.

==== The concept of Shakti and the Mahavidyas ====
At the heart of Tantric mythology is the personification of divine feminine energy as a Mother Goddess from which all existence stems. In this worldview, male gods like those of the Trimurti are considered inactive or "non-existent" without their feminine counterparts.

==== Ritual practices and Mythology ====
Tantric narratives often diverged from the Epic focus on social duty (dharma) and asceticism, instead incorporating themes of ritual complexity and sensory experience. This period revived the significance of blood sacrifice to appease fierce deities like Durga or Kali, with specific texts providing detailed instructions for offering intended to ensure prosperity or the destruction of malignant forces. The tradition is famously divided into two distinct paths:

- The Right-Handed Path: consists of rites performed openly that generally align with mainstream Hindu customs.
- The Left-Handed Path: Involves secretive rituals that may incorporate acts or substances usually prohibited by orthodox Hinduism - such as meat and intoxicating drinks - as tools for achieving spiritual liberation (moksha).

==== Syncretism and Historical continuity ====
The Tantric era was a period of intense syncretism, where local and tribal beliefs were integrated into the broader Hindu pantheon by identifying regional goddesses as manifestations of Shakti. While Tantric mythology differed radically in its emphasis on the goddess's cosmic energy, writers often sought to establish continuity with the past by explaining their doctrines as legitimate developments of ancient Vedic concepts.

=== Modern period ===
==== Mass Media and Transmission ====
The late 20th century marked a significant event in television history with the 1987-1988 broadcast of the Ramayana series. This production attracted over 100 million viewers, famously causing public life in India to come to a standstill during its airtime and even prompting labor strikes to ensure the series finale was aired. Similarly, India's Bollywood film industry has a long history of mythological retellings, beginning with the first feature-length silent film, Raja Harishchandra (1913) (1913). Modern cinema continues this trend with direct retellings such as Ravan (2010) and superhero films like Krissh (2013), which draws on the powers reminiscent of Krishna. These media portrayals have reinforced the "profound emotional and psychological resonance" that epics like Ramayana and Mahabharata hold for modern Hindus.

Hindu myths were similarly communicated through comic books such as the Amar Chitra Katha series. The Tales of Durga for example, retells the Devi Mahatmya, bringing the mythological and philosophical messages of an ancient Hindu scripture about the goddess Durga to a modern audience.

==== Global influence ====
The Ramayana and Mahabharata have been translated into many languages and adapted across Southeast Asia, where localised versions of both epics have influenced literary and performing arts traditions in Thailand, Indonesia, Cambodia, and the Philippines for over a millennium. Hindu deities and myths are represented in sculpture and relief work in South Asia. Southeast Asian dynasties claimed descent from Shiva, Vishnu, or Brahma to justify their rule.

== Cosmology ==
=== Creation and destruction ===
According to Puranic cosmology, there is no single story of the creation of the universe, rather a mix of alternative views. One such narrative describes Vishnu resting on the serpent Shesha in the cosmic ocean. Brahma, then emerges from a lotus growing from Vishnu's navel and begins the creation of the universe and all living beings. Another narrative describes the universe originating from a "golden egg" or Hiranyagarbha. In Shri Vidya theology, cosmos is seen as an extension of the Goddess through which she willfully contracts and expands the universe through recurring cycles of creation and reabsorption.

The destruction of the universe is known as pralaya or dissolution. Puranic texts describe several forms of pralaya, some of which occur during the night of Brahma, others at the end of Brahma's life, and a final dissolution in which all time and existence ceases. The process of creation and destruction within Hindu cosmology is viewed as endless and cyclical.

=== Time ===
In addition to the cyclical nature of creation and destruction, Hindu mythology measures time through yugas, manvantaras, and kalpas. There are four yugas or ages– Satya, Treta, Dvapara, and Kali and together they form a mahayuga. Seventy-one mahayugas make a manvantara, and fourteen such manvantaras make one kalpa or one day of Brahma.

== Mythical themes and types ==
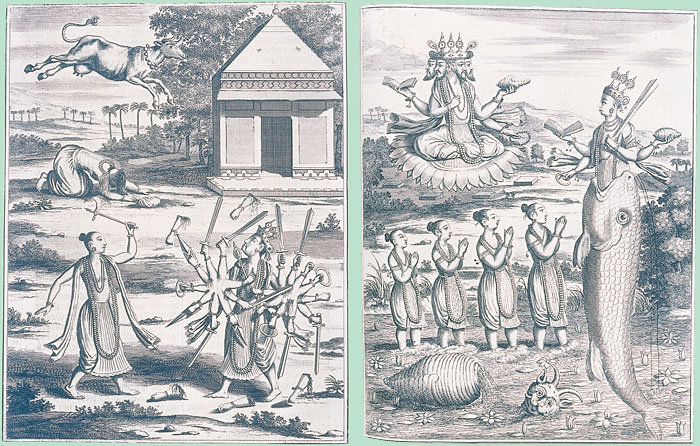
Depictions of episodes from Hindu mythology

Scholars often define mythology as deeply valued stories that explain a society's existence and world order: those narratives of a society's creation, its origins and foundations, its god(s), its original heroes, humanity's connection to the "divine", and its narratives of eschatology (what happens in the "afterlife"). This is a very general outline of some of the basic sacred stories with those themes. In its broadest academic sense, the word myth simply means a traditional story. However, many scholars restrict the term "myth" to sacred stories. Folklorists often go further, defining myths as "tales believed as true, usually sacred, set in the distant past or other worlds or parts of the world, and with extra-human, inhuman, or heroic characters".

In classical Greek, muthos, from which the English word myth derives, meant "story, narrative." Hindu mythology often does not have a consistent, monolithic structure. The same mythic narrative typically appears in various versions, and can be represented differently across different regional and socio-religious traditions. Many of these legends evolve across these texts, where the character names change or the story is embellished with greater details. According to Suthren Hirst, these myths have been given a complex range of interpretations. Doniger O'Flaherty argues that the central message and moral values remain the same. They have been modified by various philosophical schools over time, and are interpreted as having deeper, often symbolic, meaning.

=== Sacred geography ===
Hindu mythology is linked with sacred geography. Diana Eck notes that Hindu mythology is linked to its rivers, mountains, forests, villages, and cities. Places such as Mathura, identified as Krishna's birthplace, and Guptakashi in the Himalayas, linked to the stories from the Mahabharata, forest places associated with the Ramayana all show how mythological stories are linked to specific locations. Rivers like the Ganga, Godavari, and Narmada are considered sacred and are connected to stories of divine descent. The Ganga was originally a heavenly river that came to earth through the prayers of sage Bhagiratha. Through pilgrimage and local traditions, mythological stories become connected to specific sacred locations, giving religious meaning to the landscape itself. Many of these places are known as tirthas, a term meaning "fords" or "crossings", and are understood as sites where "the gods are close and the benefits of worship generous".

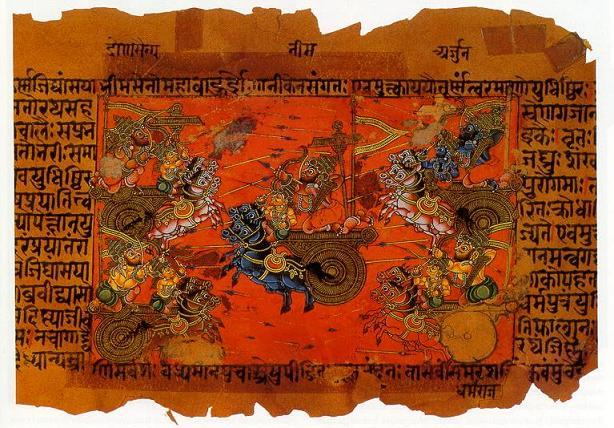
picture of a Mahabharat manuscript

=== Themes from the epic Mahabharata ===
The Mahabharata is a great war epic from ancient India that involves royal families, kinship, heroism, and conflict, understood through the broader philosophical lens of Karma and Dharma. Mythological themes emerge from personal and divine interventions in the broader political and military struggles.

==== War Heroism (Warrior Dharma) ====
The Mahabharata presents the Kurukshetra War as both a dynastic struggle and a moral conflict highlighting themes of Kshatriya (warrior) dharma, kingship, and justice. The Mahabharata is centered on large-scale wars that focus on theme of warrior heroism as well as the destruction and grief caused by warfare.

==== Fate, Destiny, and Cosmic Order (Karma and Dharma) ====
Mahabharata emphasizes destiny, but interprets it through the Hindu concepts of karma and dharma, where actions produce moral consequences across generations and shape the cosmic balance of the universe. The epic portrays human life as governed by larger cosmic forces beyond individual control.

==== Moral Conflict and Ethical Duty (Dharma as Duty) ====
The Mahabharata is deeply concerned with moral ambiguity and the complexity of righteous action. Characters repeatedly face conflicts between family loyalty, political obligation, and ethical duty, making dharma one of the epic’s defining concerns. The epic examines how heroes struggle psychologically and ethically within the violence of war.

==== Royal Family duties and conflicts (Raj Dharma) ====
The Mahabharata centers on a war between cousins of the same royal lineage, transforming kinship into a source of betrayal and destruction, guided by broader themes of royal duties (Raj Dharma). The epic depicts warfare as a tragic conflict within interconnected families and social systems. Throughout the narrative, personal relationships become inseparable from political and military struggles.

==== Mortality, Existence, and Renunciation (Yoga and Dharma) ====
Another theme from the Mahabharata is the awareness of mortality and impermanence. The Mahabharata reflects on suffering, death, renunciation, and the cyclical nature of existence through philosophical dialogues on Yoga and Dharma. The epics ultimately uses war narratives to explore universal questions concerning human suffering, destiny, morality, and the search for meaning in existence.

=== Themes from the epic Ramayana ===
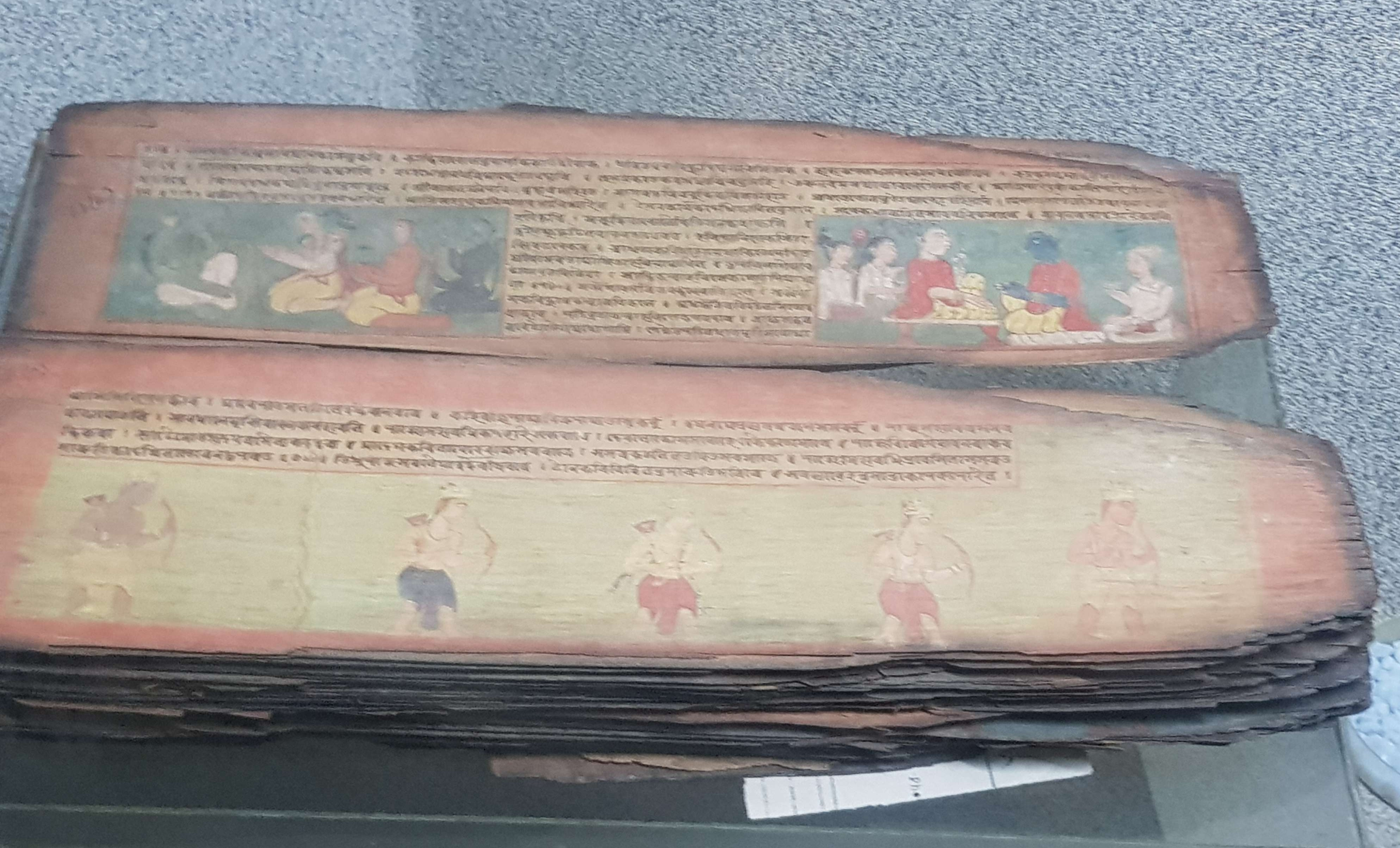
picture of an illustrated manuscript of the Ramayan

The Ramayana is a foundational epic that shaped the civilisation of ancient India. The Ramayana is a dharma-centered exile and rescue narrative. Rama is exiled from his kingdom, his wife Sita is abducted by Ravana, and the story follows Rama’s mission to rescue her and restore moral order, in a journey involving demons (rakshasas), the monkey god Hanuman, tragedies and moral tests.

==== Heroic ideal (Moral Dharma) ====
The epic Ramayana presents the heroic ideal through Rama, whose greatness derives from adherence to dharma, moral self-discipline, and righteous conduct even under suffering and exile. The Ramayana places ethical duty at the center of its worldview, portraying Rama’s unwavering commitment to dharma as more important than personal happiness or political advantage. Rama embodies the archetype of the ideal king whose conduct exemplifies justice, restraint, loyalty, and righteous governance within both family and kingdom.

==== Karma, actions, and Universal Dharma ====
The Ramayana interprets fate through the interconnected concepts of karma and dharma, where moral actions shape cosmic and personal outcomes, and Rama’s success ultimately derives from righteous conduct aligned with universal order. In the Odyssey, human life is shaped by a somewhat similar force, "moira" (destiny), that even the gods cannot entirely escape, and Odysseus’s journey reflects the Greek belief that suffering and struggle are inseparable from fate.

==== Life Journey and Returning Home ====
The Ramayana centres on the journey of Rama from exile, war and finally returning to homeland, Ayodhya. Rama accepts banishment from Ayodhya, rescues Sita from Ravana, and eventually returns to establish righteous rule.

==== Good versus Evil and Cosmic order ====
In the Ramayana, divine involvement reflects a cosmic moral order in which Rama, regarded as an incarnation of God Vishnu, restores dharma and defeats evil demon, Ravana to preserve a cosmic order (dharma), though the Evil in ancient Hindu philosophy differs from modern western interpretations, in that evil entities may also become devotees of God, and transform themselves towards goodness. Therefore, an ancient demon is different from modern devil, in terms of possibilities of transformation.

== Comparative mythology ==
The most influential comparative framework is the trifunctional hypothesis developed by French mythologist Georges Dumézil (1898-1986). Dumézil argued that Proto-Indo-European society was organized around three hierarchically ordered "functions" - sovereignty (magico-religious and juridical), military force, and fertility/sustenance - and that these functions were collectively represented in the myths of various Indo-European-derived cultures. Dumézil argued that the Mahabharata represents a systematic transposition of Vedic deities into epic heroes. According to this view, Yudhisthira derives from Mitra/Varuna and embodies the first function i.e righteous sovereignty. Arjuna derives from Indra and embodies the second function i.e warrior idea. The twin heroes Nakula and Sahadeva derive from the Ashvins and embody the third function i.e fertility, healing, prosperity. Bhima embodies a secondary, brutish aspect of the warrior function.

== Symbols ==
A few of the symbols that frequent Hindu myths

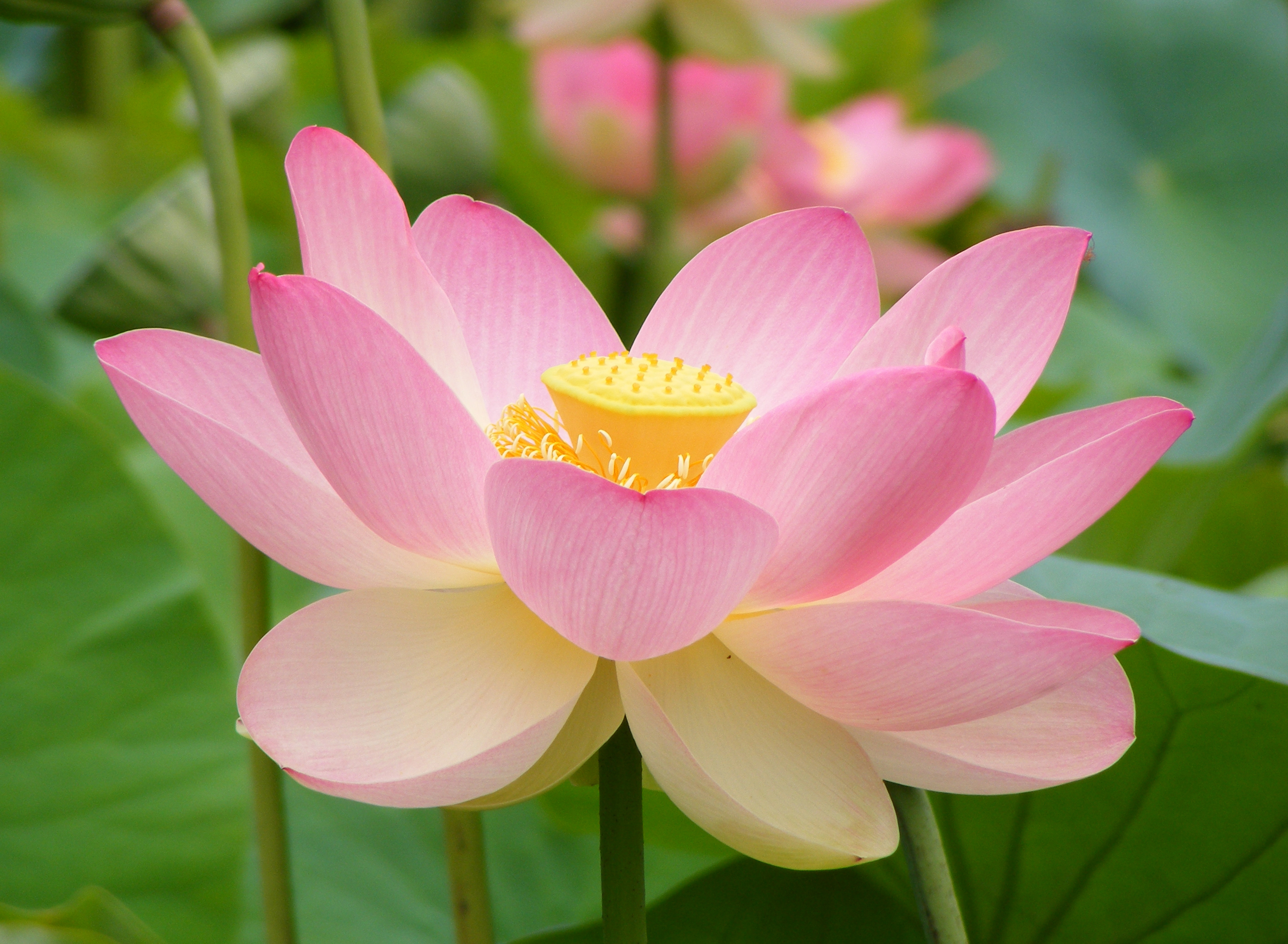
Lotus

Chakra, Shanka, Gadha, Padma, Narayana

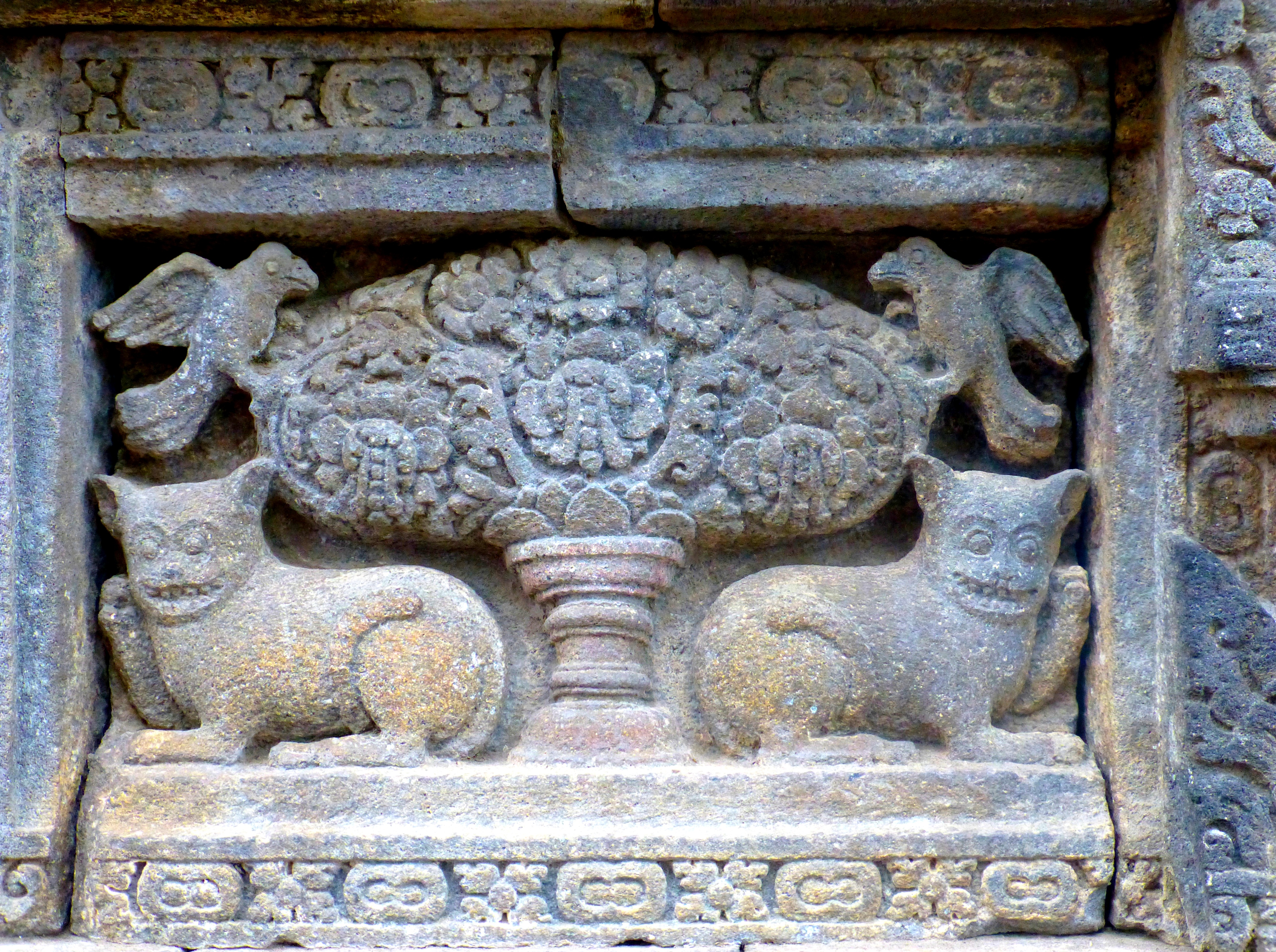
Kalpataru

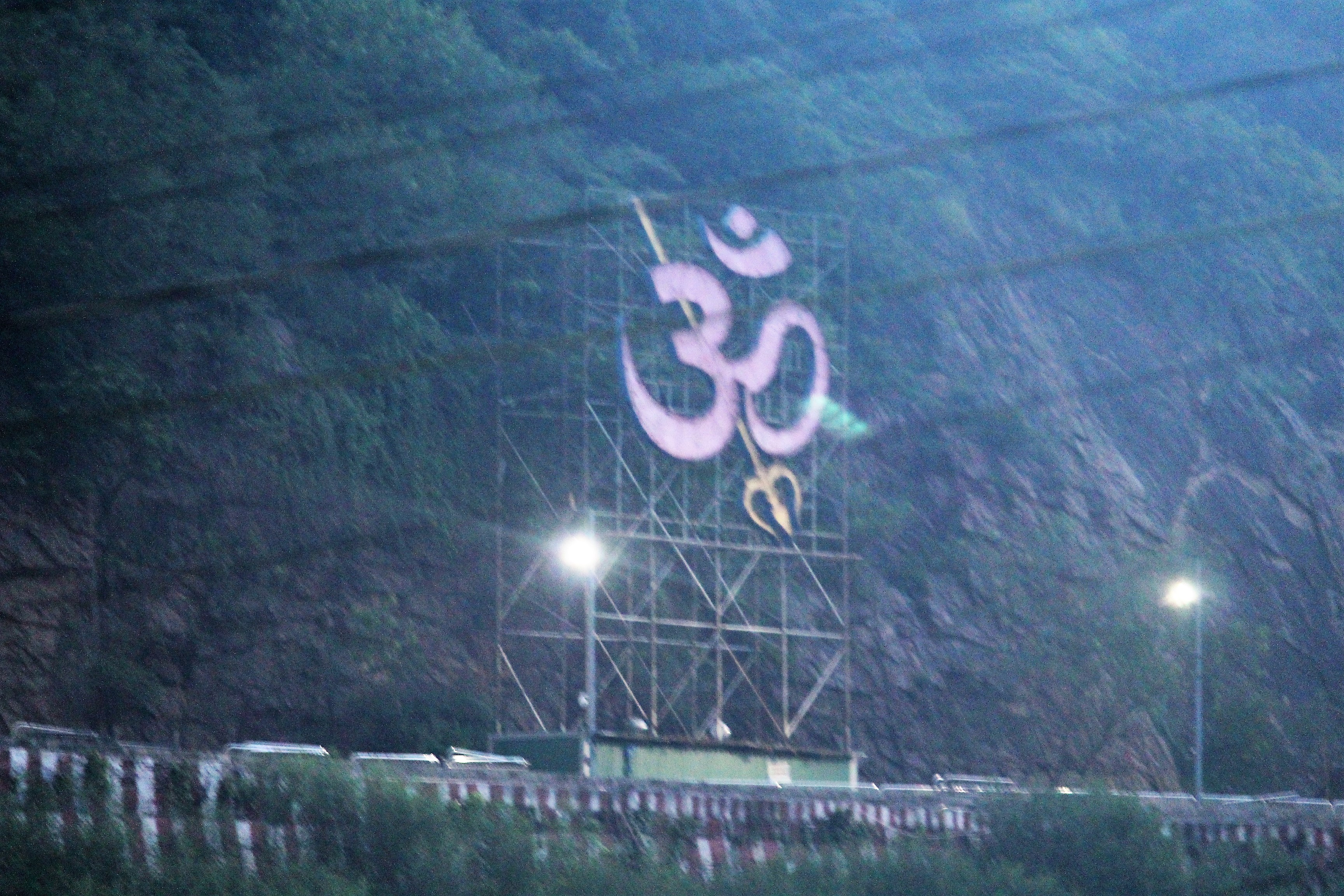
Om

== See also ==
- Comparative mythology
- Itihasa
- Dashavatara
- Hinduism
- Hindu cosmology
- Hindu deities
- Hindu eschatology
- Hindu scriptures
- Meitei mythology
- Proto-Indo-European mythology
- Proto-Indo-Iranian religion
- Saga
- Vedic mythology

== Sources ==
- Basham, A. L. (2004). The Wonder that was India. Pan Macmillan. ISBN 978-0-330-43909-1.
- Bonnefoy, Yves (1993). Asian Mythologies. University of Chicago Press. ISBN 978-0-226-06456-7. Archived from the original on 24 April 2023.
- Bronkhorst, Johannes (1993), The Two Traditions Of Meditation In Ancient India, Motilal Banarsidass Publ.
- Cohen, Signe (2018). The Upanisads: A Complete Guide. Routledge. ISBN 978-1-138-79505-1.
- Doniger, Wendy (2009). The Hindus : an alternative history. New York : Penguin Press. ISBN 978-1-59420-205-6.
- Doniger O'Flaherty, Wendy (1975). Hindu epics: A Sourcebook translated from the Sanskrit. Penguin. ISBN 978-0140449907.
- Eck, Diana L. (27 March 2012). India: A Sacred Geography. Harmony/Rodale/Convergent. ISBN 978-0-385-53191-7.
- Hardy, Adam (2007). The temple architecture of India. Chichester ; Hoboken, NJ : John Wiley & Sons. ISBN 978-0-470-02827-8.
- Hiltebeitel, Alf (2001). Rethinking the Mahabharata: A Reader's Guide to the Education of the Dharma King. Chicago, IL: University of Chicago Press. ISBN 978-0-226-34054-8.
- Washburn Hopkins, Edward (1986). Epic Mythology. Motilal Banarsidass. ISBN 978-81-208-0227-8. Archived from the original on 24 April 2023.
- MacKay, Jennifer (2015). Hindu Mythology. Lucent Books. ISBN 978-1-4205-1147-5.
- Macdonell, Arthur Anthony (1978). Vedic Mythology ((reprint) ed.). Motilal Banarsidass. ISBN 978-81-208-1113-3. Archived from the original on 24 April 2023.
- Olivelle, Patrick (1998). The Early Upanishads: Annotated Text and Translation. Oxford University Press, USA. ISBN 978-0-19-512435-4.
- Olivelle, Patrick (1999). Pañcatantra: The Book of India's Folk Wisdom. Oxford University Press. ISBN 978-0-19-283988-6.
- Opler, Morris E.; Campbell, Joseph (1962). "The Masks of God: Primitive Mythology". The Journal of American Folklore. 75 (295). doi:10.2307/537862. ISSN 0021-8715. JSTOR 537862.
- Suthren Hirst, Jacqueline (1998), "Myth and history", in Bowen, Paul (ed.), Themes and Issues in Hinduism, Cassell
- Tull, Herman Wayne (1989). The Vedic origins of karma : cosmos as man in ancient Indian myth and ritual. Internet Archive. Albany : State University of New York Press. ISBN 978-0-7914-0094-4.
- Waldau, Paul; Patton, Kimberley (2009). A Communion of Subjects: Animals in Religion, Science, and Ethics. Columbia University Press. ISBN 978-0-231-13643-3.
- Wilkins, W. J. (2001). Hindu Mythology: Vedic and Puranic. Rupa Publications. ISBN 978-0-01-000158-7.
- Williams, George M. (2003). Handbook of Hindu Mythology. New York: Oxford University Press. ISBN 978-0-19-533261-2.
- Williams, George M. (2008). Handbook of Hindu Mythology. New York: Oxford University Press.
- Stone, Zayden (2023). The Women of Hindu Mythology: A Beginner's Guide to the Goddesses, Heroines and Demonesses in Hinduism's Myths and Folktales. Spent Pens.
- Littleton, C. Scott (1973). The New Comparative Mythology: An Anthropological Assessment of the Theories of Georges Dumézil (revised ed.). University of California Press. ISBN 978-0-520-02403-8.
- Goldberg, Philip (2010). American Veda. Harmony Books. ISBN 978-0-385-52134-5.
