= John Hirst =

John Hirst is the name of:

- John Hirst (businessman), Chief Executive of the UK Met Office
- John Hirst (criminal) (born 1950), convicted of manslaughter in 1980 and a campaigner for prisoners' rights
- John Hirst (historian) (1942–2016), emeritus professor of history at La Trobe University, Melbourne, Australia
- Jack Hirst, rugby league footballer who played in the 1920s for England, and Featherstone Rovers
- John Henry Hirst (1826–1882) English architect, working in Bristol and Harrogate
- John Malcolm Hirst (1921–1997), British aerobiologist, agricultural botanist, and mycologist

== See also ==
- John Hurst (disambiguation)
- Hirst (surname)
