= Senator Hirst =

Senator Hirst may refer to:

- Byron Hirst (1912–2002), Wyoming State Senate
- Omer L. Hirst (1915–2003), Virginia State Senate

== See also ==
- Senator Hurst (disambiguation)
