= John Hearst =

John Hearst may refer to:

- John Randolph Hearst, American business executive
- John Augustine Hearst, American business and media executive, film producer and philanthropist
- John E. Hearst, American-Austrian chemist

== See also ==
- John Hurst (disambiguation)
