= Hearst =

Hearst may refer to:

== Places ==
- Hearst, former name of Hacienda, California, United States
- Hearst, Ontario, town in Northern Ontario, Canada
- Hearst, California, an unincorporated community in Mendocino County, United States
- Hearst Island, an island in Antarctica
- Hearst Castle, a mansion built by William Randolph Hearst in San Simeon, California, United States
- Hearst Block, a provincial government building in Toronto, Ontario, Canada

== People ==
- Hearst (surname)
- William Randolph Hearst (1863–1951), newspaper magnate
- Hunter Hearst Helmsley (b. 1969), WWE professional wrestler
- Michael Hearst (b. 1972), musician, composer, writer

== Arts, entertainment, and media ==
- Hearst College, a fictional College in the CW series Veronica Mars
- Hearst Communications, a privately held media conglomerate
- Hearst Television, Hearst Communications' broadcast television division (formerly Hearst-Argyle Television)

== Other uses ==
- Université de Hearst, a French-language university federated with Laurentian University, based in Hearst, Ontario

== See also ==
- Herst (disambiguation)
- Hirst (disambiguation)
- Hurst (disambiguation)
