= Livy =

Roman historian (59 BC – AD 17)

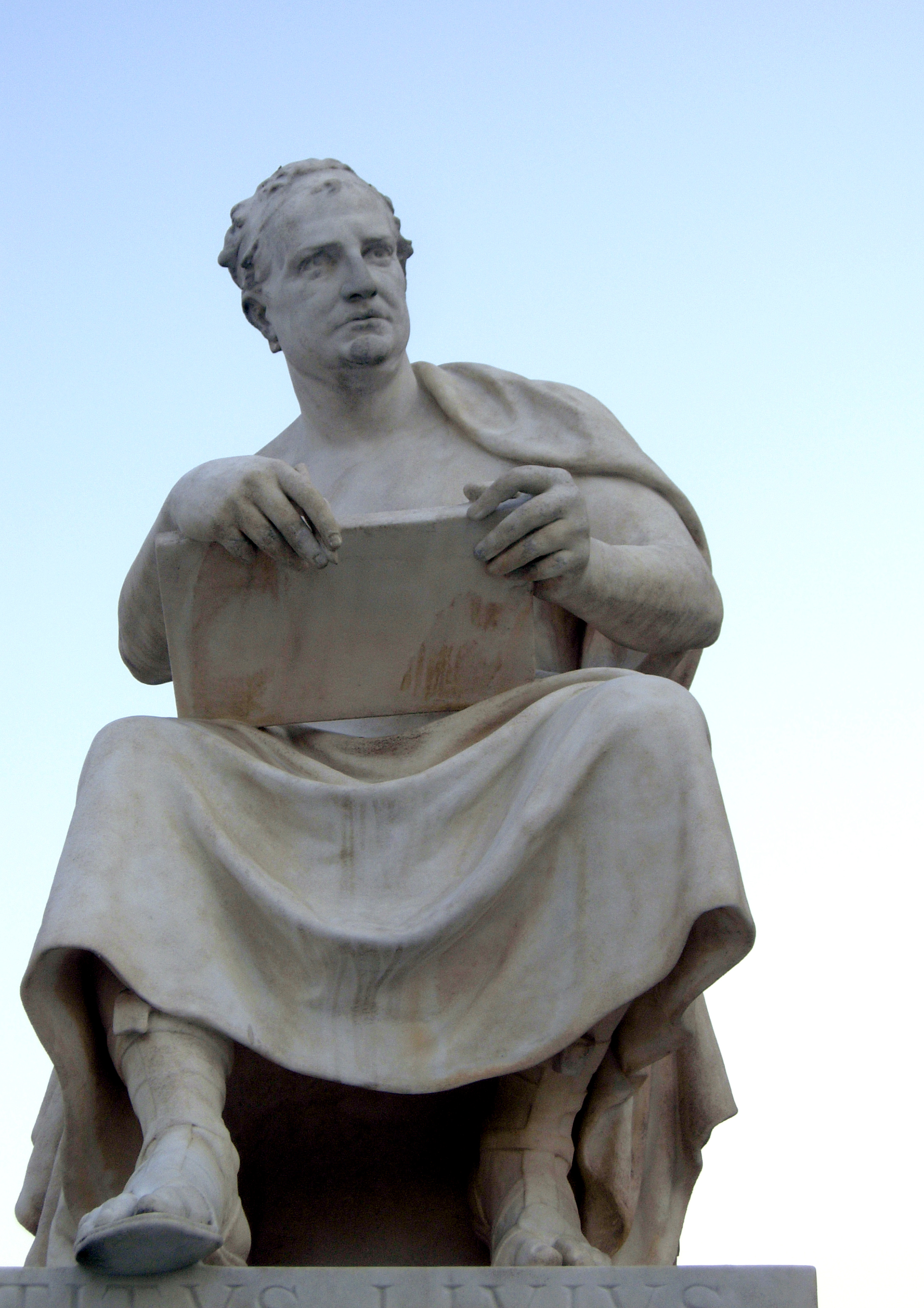
- 19th-century statue of Livy at the Austrian Parliament Building
- Born: Titus Livius (Note: Titus is the praenomen (the personal name); Livius is the nomen (the gentile name, i.e. "belonging to the gens Livia"). Therefore, Titus Livius did not have a cognomen (third name, i.e. family name), which was not unusual during the Roman Republic. About this, classical sources agree: Seneca (Ep. 100.9); Tacitus (Ann. IV.34.4); Pliny (Ep. II.3.8); and Suetonius (Claud. 41.1) call him Titus Livius. Quintilian calls him Titus Livius (Inst. Or. VIII.1.3; VIII.2.18; X.1.101) or simply Livius (Inst. Or. I.5.56; X.1.39). In the sepulchral inscription from Patavium, which most probably concerns Titus, he is named, with the patronymic, T Livius C f, ''Titus Livius Gai filius'' (CIL V, 2975).); 59 BC; Patavium, Roman Republic (modern Padua, Italy)
- Died: AD 17 (aged 74–75); Patavium, Roman Empire
- Occupation: Historian
- Years active: Golden Age of Latin

Academic background
- Influences: Polybius; Cicero

Academic work
- Discipline: History
- Main interests: History, biography, oratory
- Notable works: Ab urbe condita

Titus Livius (Latin: [ˈtɪtʊs ˈliːwiʊs]; 59 BC – AD 17), known in English as Livy (/ˈlɪvi/ LIV-ee), was a Roman historian. He wrote a monumental history of Rome and the Roman people, titled Ab Urbe Condita, ''From the Founding of the City'', covering the period from the earliest legends of Rome before the traditional founding in 753 BC through the reign of Augustus in Livy's own lifetime. He was on good terms with members of the Julio-Claudian dynasty and was a friend of Augustus. Livy encouraged Augustus's young grandnephew, the future emperor Claudius, to take up the writing of history.

== Life ==
Livy was born in Patavium in northern Italy, now modern Padua, probably in 59 BC. (Note: Jerome says Livy was born in 59 BC and died in AD 17. First proposed by G. M. Hirst, Ronald Syme and others have suggested bringing his birth and death dates back five years (64 BC – AD 12), but this idea has not gained consensus.) At the time of his birth, his home city of Patavium was the second wealthiest on the Italian peninsula, and the largest in the province of Cisalpine Gaul (northern Italy). Cisalpine Gaul was merged into Italy proper during his lifetime and its inhabitants were given Roman citizenship by Julius Caesar. In his works, Livy often expressed his deep affection and pride for Patavium, and the city was well known for its conservative values in morality and politics.

Livy's teenage years were during the 40s BC, a period of civil wars throughout the Roman world. The governor of Cisalpine Gaul at the time, Asinius Pollio, tried to sway Patavium into supporting Marcus Antonius (Mark Antony), the leader of one of the warring factions during Caesar's civil war (49–45 BC). The wealthy citizens of Patavium refused to contribute money and arms to Asinius Pollio, and went into hiding. Pollio then attempted to bribe the slaves of those wealthy citizens to expose the whereabouts of their masters; his bribery failed, and the citizens instead pledged their allegiance to the Senate. It is therefore likely that the Roman civil wars prevented Livy from pursuing a higher education in Rome or going on a tour of Greece, which was common for adolescent males of the nobility at the time. Many years later, Asinius Pollio derisively commented on Livy's "patavinity", saying that Livy's Latin showed certain "provincialisms" frowned upon in Rome. Pollio's remarks may have been the result of negative feelings he harboured toward the city of Patavium from his experiences there during the civil wars.

Livy likely went to Rome in the 30s BC, and it is probable that he spent a large amount of time in the city after this, although it may not have been his primary residence. During his time in Rome, he was never a senator nor held a government position. His writings contain elementary mistakes on military matters, indicating that he probably never served in the Roman army. However, he was educated in philosophy and rhetoric. It seems that Livy had the financial resources and means to live an independent life, though the origin of that wealth is unknown. He devoted a large part of his life to his writings, which he was able to do because of his financial freedom.

Livy was known to give recitations to small audiences, but he was not heard of to engage in declamation, then a common pastime. He was familiar with the emperor Augustus and the imperial family. Augustus was considered by later Romans to have been the greatest Roman emperor, benefiting Livy's reputation long after his death. Suetonius described how Livy encouraged the future emperor Claudius, who was born in 10 BC, to write historiographical works during his childhood.

Livy's most famous work was his history of Rome. In it he narrates a complete history of the city of Rome, from its foundation to the death of Augustus. Because he was writing under the reign of Augustus, Livy's history emphasizes the great triumphs of Rome. He wrote his history with embellished accounts of Roman heroism in order to promote the new type of government implemented by Augustus when he became emperor. In the preface to his history Livy wrote that he did not care whether his personal fame remained in darkness, as long as his work helped to "preserve the memory of the deeds of the world's preeminent nation." Because Livy was mostly writing about events that had occurred hundreds of years earlier, the historical value of his work was questionable, although many Romans came to believe his account to be true.

Livy was married and had at least one daughter and one son. He also produced other works, including an essay in the form of a letter to his son, and numerous dialogues, most likely modelled on similar works by Cicero. One of his sons wrote a book on geography and a daughter married Lucius Magius, a rhetorician.

Titus Livius died at his home city of Patavium in AD 17. The tombstone of Livy and his wife might have been found in Padua.

== Works ==
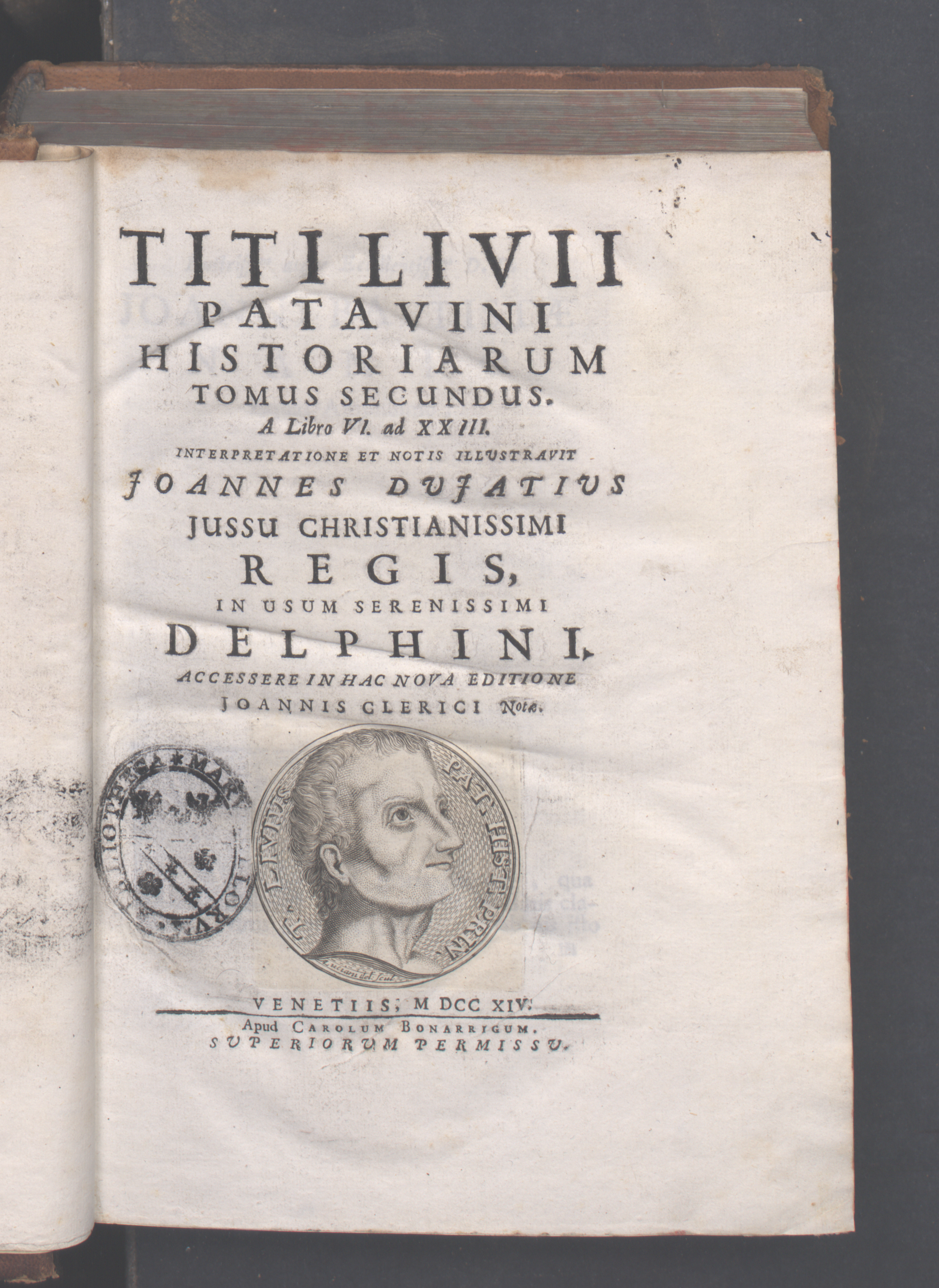
Ab Urbe condita (printed edition dated 1714)

Livy's only surviving work is commonly known as History of Rome (or Ab Urbe Condita, 'From the Founding of the City'). Together with Polybius it is considered one of the main accounts of the Second Punic War.

When he began this work he was already past his youth, probably 33; presumably, events in his life prior to that time had led to his intense activity as a historian. He continued working on it until he left Rome for Padua in his old age, probably in the reign of Tiberius after the death of Augustus. Seneca the Younger says he was an orator and philosopher and had written some historical treatises in those fields. (Note: "Livy wrote both dialogues, which should be ranked as history no less than as philosophy, and works which professedly deal with philosophy" ("scripsit enim et dialogos, quos non magis philosophiae adnumerare possis quam historiae, et ex professo philosophiam continentis libros") —Seneca the Younger. Moral Letters to Lucilius. 100.9.)

History of Rome also served as the driving force behind the "northern theory" regarding the Etruscans' origins. This is because in the book Livy states, "The Greeks also call them the 'Tyrrhene' and the 'Adriatic ... The Alpine tribes are undoubtedly of the same kind, especially the Raetii, who had through the nature of their country become so uncivilized that they retained no trace of their original condition except their language, and even this was not free from corruption". Thus, many scholars, like Karl Otfried Müller, utilized this statement as evidence that the Etruscans or the Tyrrhenians migrated from the north and were descendants of an Alpine tribe known as the Raeti.

== Reception ==
=== Imperial era ===
Livy's History of Rome was in high demand from the time it was published and remained so during the early years of the empire. Pliny the Younger reported that Livy's celebrity was so widespread, a man from Cádiz travelled to Rome and back for the sole purpose of meeting him. Livy's work was a source for the later works of Aurelius Victor, Cassiodorus, Eutropius, Festus, Florus, Granius Licinianus and Orosius. Julius Obsequens used Livy, or a source with access to Livy, to compose his De Prodigiis, an account of supernatural events in Rome from the consulship of Scipio and Laelius to that of Paulus Fabius and Quintus Aelius.

Livy wrote during the reign of Augustus, who came to power after a civil war with generals and consuls claiming to be defending the Roman Republic, such as Pompey. Patavium had been pro-Pompey. To clarify his status, the victor of the civil war, Octavian Caesar, had wanted to take the title Romulus (the first king of Rome) but in the end accepted the senate proposal of Augustus. Rather than abolishing the republic, he adapted it and its institutions to imperial rule.

The historian Tacitus, writing about a century after Livy's time, described the Emperor Augustus as his friend. Describing the trial of Cremutius Cordus, Tacitus represents him as defending himself face-to-face with the frowning Tiberius as follows:

I am said to have praised Brutus and Cassius, whose careers many have described and no one mentioned without eulogy. Titus Livius, pre-eminently famous for eloquence and truthfulness, extolled Cn. Pompeius in such a panegyric that Augustus called him Pompeianus, and yet this was no obstacle to their friendship.

Livy's reasons for returning to Padua after the death of Augustus (if he did) are unclear, but the circumstances of Tiberius's reign certainly allow for speculation.

=== Later ===
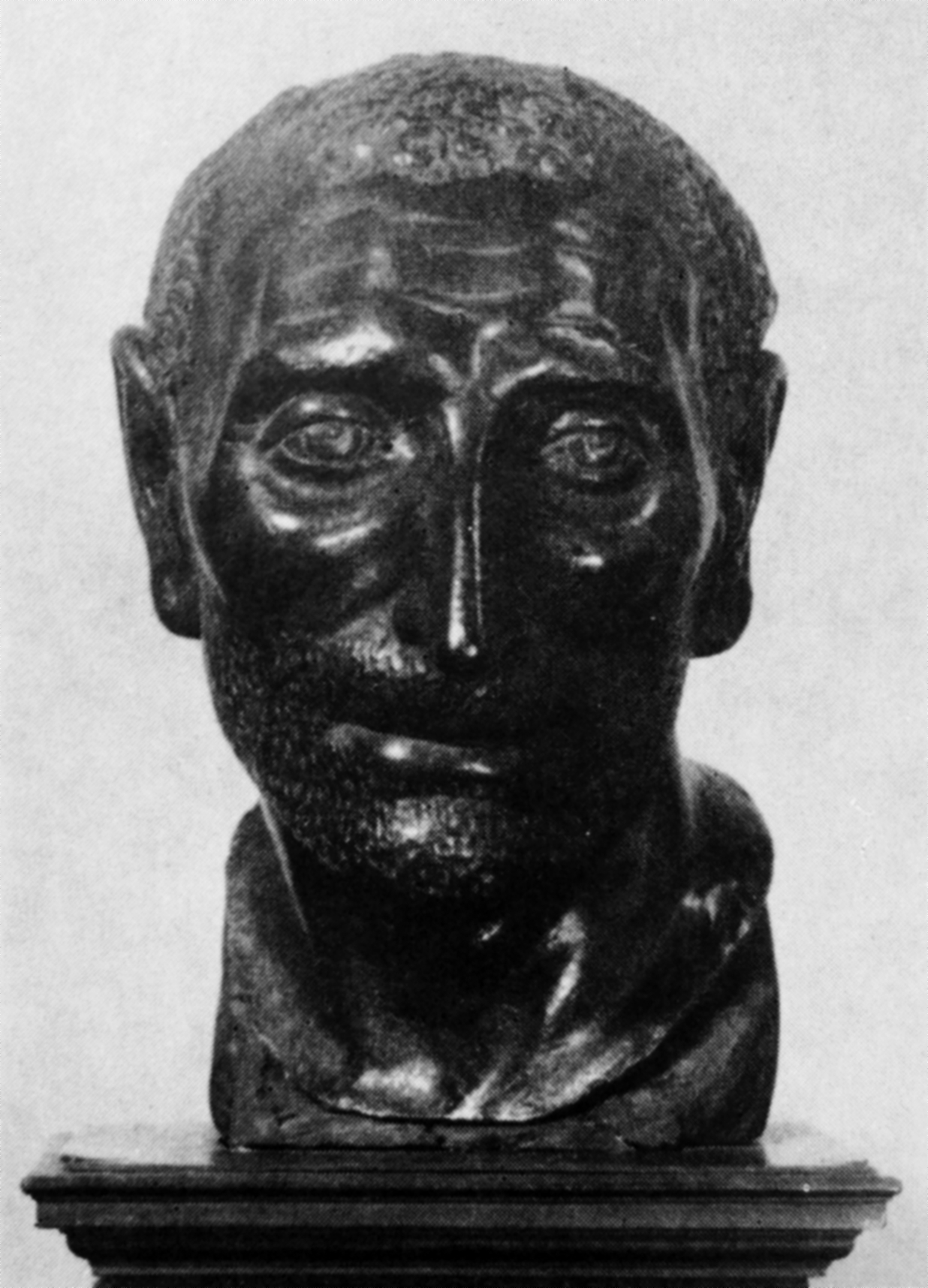
Titus Livius by Andrea Briosco (c. 1567)

During the Middle Ages, due to the length of the work, the literate class was already reading summaries rather than the work itself, which was tedious to copy, expensive, and required a lot of storage space. It must have been during this period, if not before, that manuscripts began to be lost without replacement. The Renaissance was a time of intense revival; the population discovered that Livy's work was being lost and large amounts of money changed hands in the rush to collect Livian manuscripts. The poet Beccadelli sold a country home for funding to purchase one manuscript copied by Poggio. Petrarch and Pope Nicholas V launched a search for the now missing books. Laurentius Valla published an amended text initiating the field of Livy scholarship. Dante speaks highly of him in his poetry, and Francis I of France commissioned extensive artwork treating Livian themes; Niccolò Machiavelli's work on republics, the Discourses on Livy, is presented as a commentary on the History of Rome. Respect for Livy rose to lofty heights. Walter Scott reports in Waverley (1814) as an historical fact that a Scotsman involved in the first Jacobite uprising of 1715 was recaptured (and executed) because, having escaped, he yet lingered near the place of his captivity in "the hope of recovering his favourite Titus Livius".

== Dates ==
The authority supplying information from which possible vital data on Livy can be deduced is Eusebius of Caesarea, a bishop of the early Christian Church. One of his works was a summary of world history in ancient Greek, termed the Chronikon, dating from the early 4th century AD. This work was lost except for fragments (mainly excerpts), but not before it had been translated in whole and in part by various authors such as St. Jerome. The entire work survives in two separate manuscripts, Armenian and Greek (Christesen and Martirosova-Torlone 2006). St. Jerome wrote in Latin. Fragments in Syriac exist.

Eusebius' work consists of two books: the Chronographia, a summary of history in annalist form, and the Chronikoi Kanones, tables of years and events. St. Jerome translated the tables into Latin as the Chronicon, probably adding some information of his own from unknown sources. Livy's dates appear in Jerome's Chronicon.

The main problem with the information given in the manuscripts is that, between them, they often give different dates for the same events or different events, do not include the same material entirely, and reformat what they do include. A date may be in Ab Urbe Condita or in Olympiads or in some other form, such as age. These variations may have occurred through scribal error or scribal license. Some material has been inserted under the aegis of Eusebius.

The topic of manuscript variants is a large and specialized one, on which authors of works on Livy seldom care to linger. As a result, standard information in a standard rendition is used, which gives the impression of a standard set of dates for Livy. There are no such dates. A typical presumption is of a birth in the 2nd year of the 180th Olympiad and a death in the first year of the 199th Olympiad, which are coded 180.2 and 199.1 respectively. All sources use the same first Olympiad, 776/775–773/772 BC by the modern calendar. By a complex formula (made so by the 0 reference point not falling on the border of an Olympiad), these codes correspond to 59 BC for the birth, 17 AD for the death. In another manuscript the birth is in 180.4, or 57 BC.

== Cultural references ==
Actor Denis Carey portrayed Livy in the mini-series I, Claudius.

== Bibliography ==
- Livy (1919) [written 27–9 BC]. Livy. Vol. I. Translated by Foster, B. O. Boston: Harvard University Press. ISBN 0-674-99256-3.
- Livy (1998) [written 27–9 BC]. The Rise of Rome. Vol. Books 1–5. Translated by Luce, T. J. Oxford: Oxford University Press..
