= Tom Hearst =

Tom Hearst is an American racing driver from Muscatine, Iowa who won the first NASCAR Advance Auto Parts Weekly Series national championship in 1982.

Driving a dirt Late Model for owners Keith Simmons and Gary Oliver, Hearst won 27 of the 50 NASCAR-sanctioned races that he entered. Most were at race tracks in Davenport, Iowa; Cedar Rapids, Iowa; West Liberty, Iowa; and Freeport, Illinois. Hearst also won 15 of the 17 non-NASCAR races in which he competed.

Hearst made an attempt in the NASCAR Southwest Series, in 1987, but failed to qualify.
