= Sam Hirst =

English cricketer (1875–1937)

Personal information
- Full name: Sam Hirst
- Born: 31 March 1875; Netherton, Yorkshire, England
- Died: 17 January 1937 (aged 61); Almondbury, Yorkshire, England
- Batting: Unknown
- Bowling: Unknown

Domestic team information
- Years: Team
- 1905: Scotland

Career statistics
Competition	First-class
Matches	1
Runs scored	61
Batting average	30.50
100s/50s	–/–
Top score	33
Balls bowled	12
Wickets	0
Bowling average	–
5 wickets in innings	–
10 wickets in match	–
Best bowling	–
Catches/stumpings	1/–
- Source: CricketArchive, 31 October 2022

Sam Hirst (31 March 1875 – 17 January 1937) was an English first-class cricketer.

Hirst was born in March 1875 at Netherton, Yorkshire. A professional cricketer, he became the professional for Uddingston Cricket Club in 1899. He was selected to represent Scotland in a first-class match against the touring Australians at Edinburgh in 1905. (Note: ESPNcricinfo lists Thomas Hirst (T. H. Hirst) as playing in the fixture against the Australians; however, this is erroneous, as it was Sam Hirst who actually played for Scotland in this match. Given Sam and Thomas were teammates at Uddingston and were both from the same area of Yorkshire, there is a strong possibility that the two were however related.) Playing as an opening batsman, he scored 28 runs in the Scottish first innings before being dismissed by Charlie McLeod, while in their second innings he was dismissed for 33 runs by the same bowler. He left his role at Uddingston as a player–coach in September 1905, being replaced by the Yorkshire professional Arthur Broadbent. Hirst died in January 1937 at Almondbury, Yorkshire.
