= Endeavour Awards =

Australian scholarship programme

The Endeavour Leadership Program, formerly Endeavour Scholarships and Fellowships, formerly Endeavour Awards, was an internationally competitive, merit-based scholarship programme that formed part of the Australian Government's $1.4 billion Australian initiative. The programme brought leading researchers, executives and students to Australia to undertake short or long term study, research and professional development in a broad range of disciplines, and enabled Australians to do the same abroad. It aimed at developing linkages between involved nations.

The Endeavour Awards were established as part of the 2003 International Education Package Engaging the World Through Education. Through international, merit-based competition, the Endeavour Awards bring leading researchers, professionals and students to Australia. The Australian Scholarships, a $1.4 billion Australian Government initiative, brings under the one umbrella the scholarship programmes managed by the federal government and AusAID. Over the five years from July 2006, Australian Scholarships have doubled the number of Australian Government funded scholarships available in the Asia-Pacific region.

Under Australian Scholarships, the Endeavour Awards were greatly expanded to provide approximately 9,000 scholarships over five years, of which nearly half were for outgoing Australians. The scholarships are a mix of postgraduate, undergraduate, vocational and technical education courses, and research and professional development awards. They are open to all fields of study. The focus of the Awards is to strengthen education linkages between Australia and the region, and to showcase Australia’s excellence in education, science and training. Notable recipients include Professor Jane Hirst from Oxford University, Chef Ganesh Iyer from LCB, Sydney.

The Endeavour Awards were divided into four categories:

- Endeavour Postgraduate and Post-doctoral Awards
- Endeavour Vocational Education and Training Awards
- Endeavour Executive Awards
- Endeavour Student Exchange Programmes

In April 2019 it was announced that the ELP was to end, with 2019 recipients the last to be funded. It is to be replaced with the Destination Australia program.
