= Trinity Market =

Market in Yorkshire, England

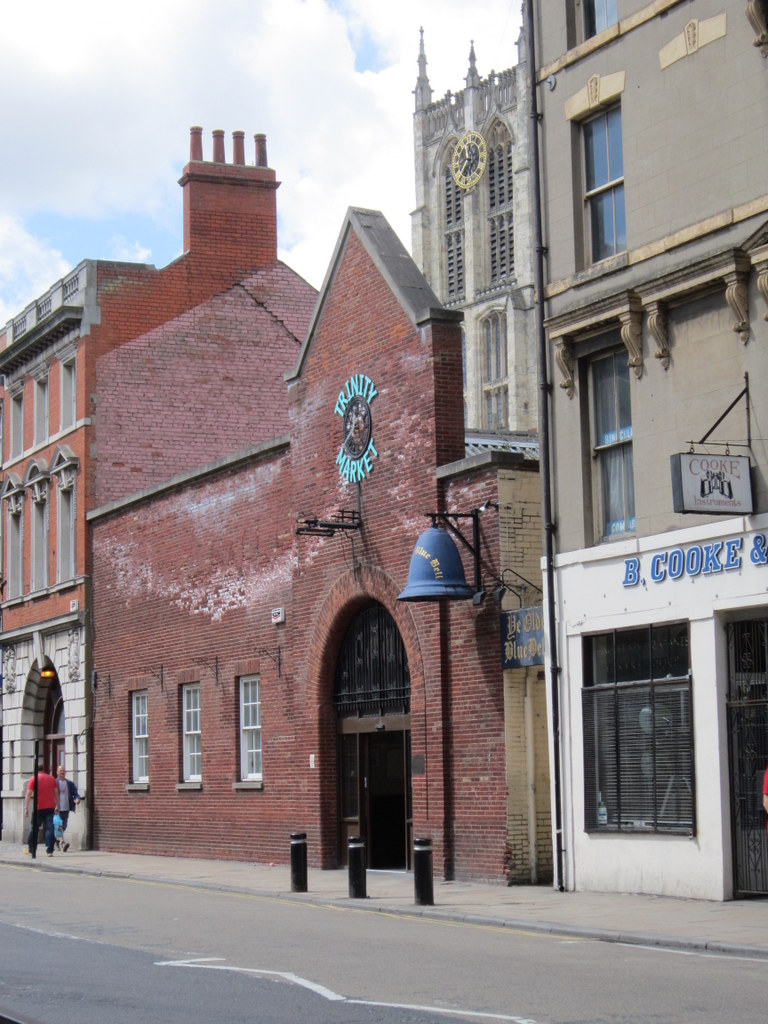
- Trinity Market on Lowgate
- Location: Trinity House Lane, Kingston upon Hull, HU1 2JH; Kingston upon Hull; 53.7423°N 0.3343°W
- Opening date: 1904
- Architect: Joseph Hirst
- Goods sold: Various
- Days normally open: Monday – Sunday
- Website: Official website
- Interactive map of Trinity Market

Trinity Market is a Grade II listed Edwardian building in the city of Kingston upon Hull, in the East Riding of Yorkshire, England. A market has existed on the site since at least 1469, and in 1904 a building was provided as an indoor market place.

== History ==
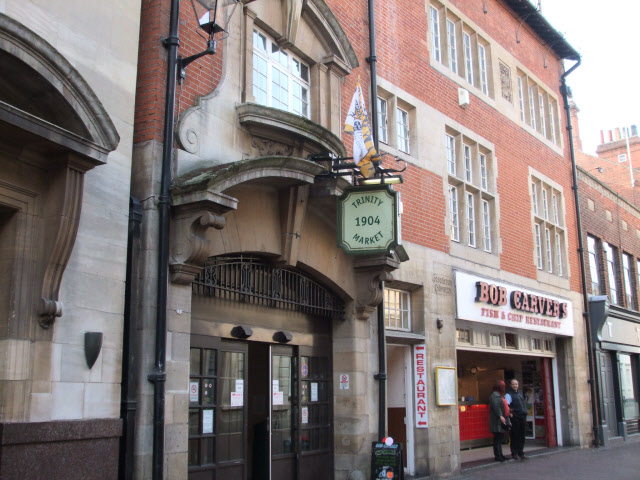
The frontage that includes the restaurant mentioned specifically in the Historic England listing

Facade and tower on North Church Side

An open-air market has existed in Hull since at least 1469, and by the 18th century the market was so popular that it was decided to build market halls to have a covered area for the stalls. During the 16th century, the market place also became the main area for local government administration, with on occasion, officials holding meetings in the adjacent chapel of Trinity Church.

In 1801 an Act of Parliament (Hull Market Place and Dock Improvement Act 1801 (41 Geo. 3. (U.K.) c. lxv)) provided for the market-place area to be expanded. The act also allowed for a direct route to the docks, to allow goods being brought to the market from sea-borne transport easier access to the market. The Trinity Market building was opened in 1904 initially selling fruit, vegetables and flowers; and by 1928 it had 74 stalls. It was designed by the city architect Joseph Hirst, and Pevsner described it as "..Baroque..[with] a domed campanile." Other open market stalls, especially those on the dock and in Humber Street were gradually moved to the open-air outside market section of Trinity Market.

In 1994 it was suggested by the market's owners that the site should be moved closer to the city centre. Stall numbers had dropped from 100 in 1981, to 70 in 1994, and some stall-owners were worried about the lack of car-parking spaces. The market hall was extensively renovated in 2006 and between 2016 and 2018. By 2021 it was announced that as all stands were occupied by businesses, the market-hall building was full, for the first time in its 117-year history.

The market hall was Grade II listed in 1974, and the whole market area is part of Hull's Old Town conservation area. In 2014 a monthly outdoor market was re-launched. From 2019 the market started opening seven days a week.
