= Hirst =

Hirst may refer to:

== People ==
- Hirst (surname), a surname (including a list of people with the name)

== Places ==
- Hirst, North Lanarkshire, a settlement in North Lanarkshire, Scotland
- Hirst, Northumberland, a settlement and former parish in Ashington, England
- Temple Hirst, North Yorkshire, England

== See also ==
- Hearst (disambiguation)
- Hurst (disambiguation)
