= Hull City Hall =

Municipal building in Hull, East Riding of Yorkshire, England

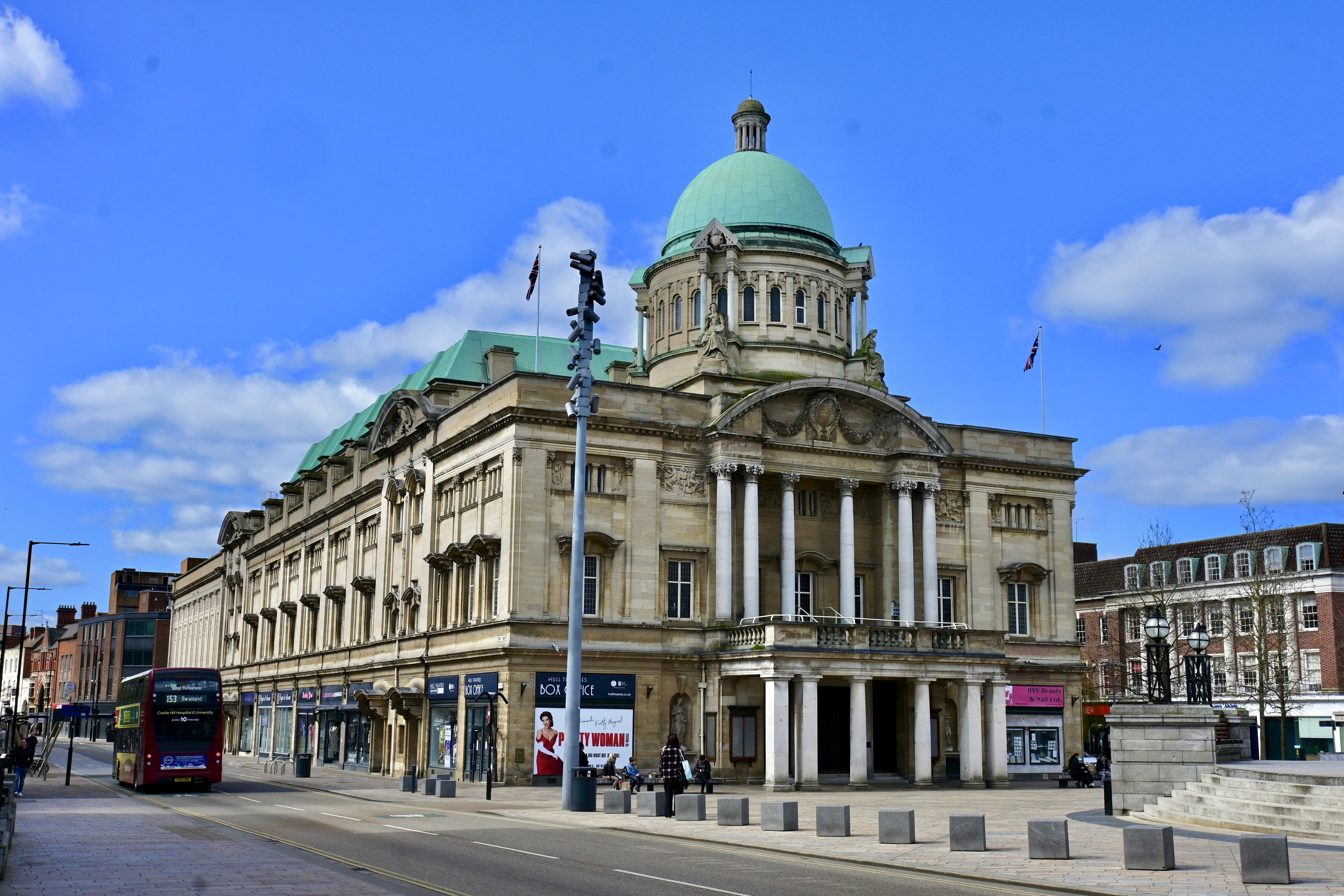
- Hull City Hall in April 2023

- Shown in the East Riding of Yorkshire
- 53.743750°N 0.340146°W
- Location: Hull, East Riding of Yorkshire, England
- OS grid reference: TA 0954 2876

History
- Built: 1909

Site notes
- Architect: Joseph Hirst
- Architectural style: Baroque Revival style

Listed Building – Grade II*
- Designated: 12 November 1973
- Reference no.: 1197685

Hull City Hall is a civic building located in Kingston upon Hull, East Riding of Yorkshire, England. Located in Queen Victoria Square in the city centre, it is a Grade II* listed building.

== History ==
The hall, which was designed by Hull's City architect Joseph Hirst in the Baroque Revival style, was built between 1903 and 1909. It was not intended to perform an administrative function for Hull's council, as these functions have historically been carried out in the Guildhall. An organ, which was built by the local firm of Forster and Andrews, was installed in time for an opening concert by the composer Edwin Lemare on 30 March 1911.

An art gallery was also installed in the building but this was removed to form the Ferens Art Gallery in Queen Victoria Square in 1927. The space created by the removal of the art gallery was instead used to accommodate an archaeological collection amassed by John Robert Mortimer known as the Mortimer Collection and the area re-opened as the Mortimer Museum in 1931.

The hall was damaged in bombing in May 1941 during the Hull Blitz of the Second World War and the organ was badly damaged. King George VI and Queen Elizabeth visited the city to see the damage and attended a concert in the hall in August 1941.

The building was restored and the organ comprehensively restored in 1951 following the war damage. The Mortimer Collection was transferred to the Transport and Archaeology Museum on High Street in 1956. The hall hosted a performance by the rock band the Who in February 1970, Siouxsie and the Banshees in October 1979, the Damned in December 1979, Slade in December 1981, and the first show of Iron Maiden's 1983 world tour in May 1983.

City Hall was altered in 1986 and again in 1989. A live album entitled MTV Unplugged (Live at Hull City Hall) was performed by Liam Gallagher and released by Warner Records on 12 June 2020.

== Services ==
City Hall is home to a grand central hall which plays host to a varied programme of concerts including pop, rock and classical music as well as civic functions such as graduation ceremonies for the University of Hull. The city's main tourist Information office and shop is based on the building's ground floor. The main hall has a floor, balcony and gallery with total capacity for 1,200 people seated, or up to 1,800 with a mixture of standing on the main floor and seated on the balcony and gallery.

In February 2021 it was announced that the building would be used as a mass vaccination centre for COVID-19 for the city and the East Riding of Yorkshire.

== See also ==
- Grade II* listed buildings in the East Riding of Yorkshire
- Listed buildings in Kingston upon Hull (Myton Ward)
