= Ernest Hirst =

English cricketer

Ernest William Hirst (27 February 1855 – 24 October 1933) was an English first-class cricketer, who played two matches for Yorkshire County Cricket Club against Middlesex and Nottinghamshire in 1881.

Born in New House, Deighton, Huddersfield, Yorkshire, England, Hirst learnt his cricket with the Lascelles Hall Cricket Club and played there from 1873 to 1888. He also played for the Huddersfield Cricket Club for many years and captained them on many occasions. He moved to Dorset in 1898.

A right-handed batsman, he scored 33 runs with a highest score of 28 on debut against Middlesex, a match Yorkshire won by fifteen runs. A right arm fast medium bowler, he bowled four overs of four balls each, conceding three runs without taking a wicket.

His brother, Edward Hirst, also played for Yorkshire County Cricket Club and others. Ernest played alongside him on his debut.

Hirst died in October 1933 in Evershot, Dorchester, Dorset.
