= Jemmy Hirst =

James "Jemmy" Hirst (1738–1829) was an English eccentric.

Hirst was born to a farmer family of Rawcliffe, Yorkshire. Even at school he kept a pet jackdaw and trained a hedgehog to follow him around. His parents' hope that he would become a priest never materialised when he was thrown out of school for his pranks. Hirst was apprenticed to a tanner, fell in love with his daughter and became engaged to her.

Reputedly Hirst's eccentricity began when his betrothed died of smallpox after he rescued her from a flooding river. At first Hirst retired to his bed and reputedly contracted "brain fever". When he recovered (apparently), he continued his habits of animal training. His first success was his later favourite, a bull he named "Jupiter" and trained to behave as a horse so he could ride him and use him to pull his carriage. The carriage itself was made of wicker, had unusually big wheels and looked like a lampshade upside down. It also had an odometer of Hirst's own design that would ring a bell after a mile of travel. When Jupiter found it hard to pull, Hirst fitted it with sails. The experiment was unsuccessful and the carriage crashed into a shop window in Pontefract; Hirst was banned from the town.

Hirst rode Jupiter in a fox hunt, using pigs as pointers instead of dogs. He tried to train an otter to fish - but getting the otter to let go of his catch was too hard. He went to Doncaster races dressed in a lambskin hat with a nine-foot brim and a waistcoat of duck feathers. Hirst also blew his hunting horn to summon the poor and the elderly to his house for tea. Sometimes the visitors found that the refreshments were served from their host's favourite coffin. Hirst hung the walls of his house with bits of old rope and iron and wrote doggerel verse. Eventually he married his housekeeper; during the ceremony he wore a toga and insisted that the formalities should be conducted in sign language. However, he did make a profitable trade of his produce and increased his wealth. His farm was the one at the North end of Chapel Lane. The farmhouse is still there but the stack yard behind it has been built on. His grave is in Rawcliffe churchyard.

Hirst's fame grew enough that King George III was intrigued and invited him to visit London. At first Hirst sent a reply that he was busy trying to train otters to fish, but would come later. When he arrived in his carriage he attracted much attention in his flamboyant costume. During his visit, one noble began to laugh. Hirst proceeded to throw a goblet of water in his face because he was clearly "having hysterics". He announced that he was pleased to find his monarch a "plain-looking fellow" and invited him to visit him in Rawcliffe for a good brandy. The king did not oblige, but reputedly gave him a number of bottles from the royal wine cellar.

Jemmy Hirst died in 1829. His will left £12 to twelve old maids who were to follow his coffin and two musicians, a fiddler and a bagpiper, who were to play happy songs. Only two old maids obliged. The priest did not let the piper play anything but O'er the hills and far away and forbade the fiddler from playing anything at all. He also left his accountant a piece of rope to "go hang himself with". Rumour claims that Hirst had had his own coffin built with windows and shelves, which he kept in his front room and charged people to sit in.

In his memory there is a pub in Rawcliffe near Goole named Jemmy Hirst at The Rose and Crown.
