= Hurst, West Virginia =

- Unincorporated community
- Location within the state of West Virginia Hurst (the United States)
- Coordinates: 39°04′23″N 80°41′56″W
- Country: United States
- State: West Virginia
- County: Lewis
- Elevation: 794 ft (242 m)
- Time zone: UTC-5 (Eastern (EST))
  - Summer (DST): UTC-4 (EDT)
- GNIS feature ID: 1549755

Hurst is an unincorporated community in Lewis County, in the U.S. state of West Virginia.

== History ==
A post office called Hurst was established in 1893, and remained in operation until 1975. The community has the name of a local pioneer named Hurst.
