= G. M. Hirst =

English-American classicist

Gertrude Mary Hirst
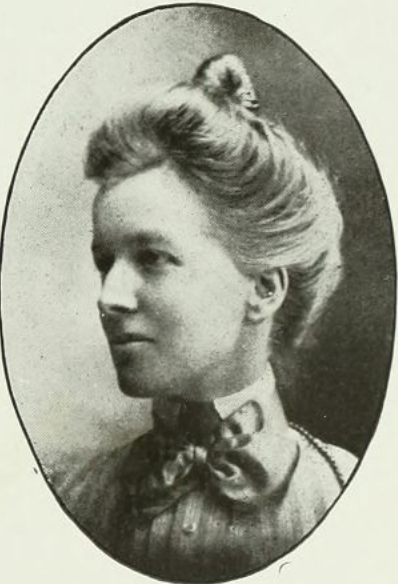
- Gertrude M. Hirst, from the 1914 yearbook of Barnard College
- Born: January 22, 1869; Huddersfield, Yorkshire, UK
- Died: January 12, 1962 (aged 92); Croton, New York, US
- Education: Columbia University (Ph.D.)
- Occupations: Classicist, philologist, college professor
- Relatives: H. H. Asquith (cousin), Francis Hirst (brother)

Gertrude Mary Hirst (January 22, 1869 – January 12, 1962), better known as G. M. Hirst, was an English-American classicist. Her most influential publication was her 1926 proposal that Livy was born in 64 BC, rather than the traditional date of 59 BC; this claim would later also be advocated by academics including Ronald Syme.

== Early life ==
Hirst was born in Huddersfield, Yorkshire, in 1869. Her father, Alfred, was a prosperous wool-stapler, and her mother, Mary Wrigley Hirst, was first cousin to H. H. Asquith, British Liberal MP and Prime Minister from 1908-1916. She was the sister of journalist, historian, and biographer Francis Hirst, and writer Margaret Hirst. Her brother William was a published authority on Argentina.

== Academic life ==
Hirst read Classics at Newnham College, Cambridge, from 1887 to 1891, where she became friends with classicist Arthur Woolgar Verrall and his wife Margaret, and the scholar of ancient Greek religion Jane Harrison. She worked as a lecturer in Classics at the University of Birmingham before moving to the United States to become a teacher at the Louisville Female Seminary, where she worked from 1891 to 1901.

She meanwhile did graduate work at Columbia under Edward Delavan Perry and Mortimer Lamson Earle, earning a master's degree in 1900 and Ph.D. in 1901. Her dissertation, The Cults of Olbia, was published in the Journal of Hellenic Studies. Upon earning her Ph.D., she became assistant professor in Greek and Latin at Barnard College, a position she held from 1901 through to her retirement in 1943.

Hirst lived in the dormitory and dined with the girls, often inviting them to tea. She was known for riding down the centre of Broadway on her bicycle. Perhaps her most famous student was archaeologist Evelyn Byrd Harrison.

Her one published book of collected papers includes writing on the Roman authors Catullus, Horace, Livy, Juvenal, Virgil, Martial, Tacitus, and Statius.

In 1957, she also published "From a Yorkshire Town to Morningside Heights," where she recounts her life experiences.

Her most influential publication was her 1926 proposal (in Classical World vol. 19) that Livy was born in 64 BC, rather than the traditional date of 59 BC. This meant that Livy died in Patavium in AD 17 at the age of 81 rather than 76, and that his advanced age, rather than the succession of Tiberius, led him to retire to his native town.

She died in Croton, New York, in 1962.

== Publications ==
Collected Classical Papers of Gertrude Mary Hirst (Basil Blackwell, Oxford, 1938)
