= Barton Cooke Hirst =

American obstetrician and educator

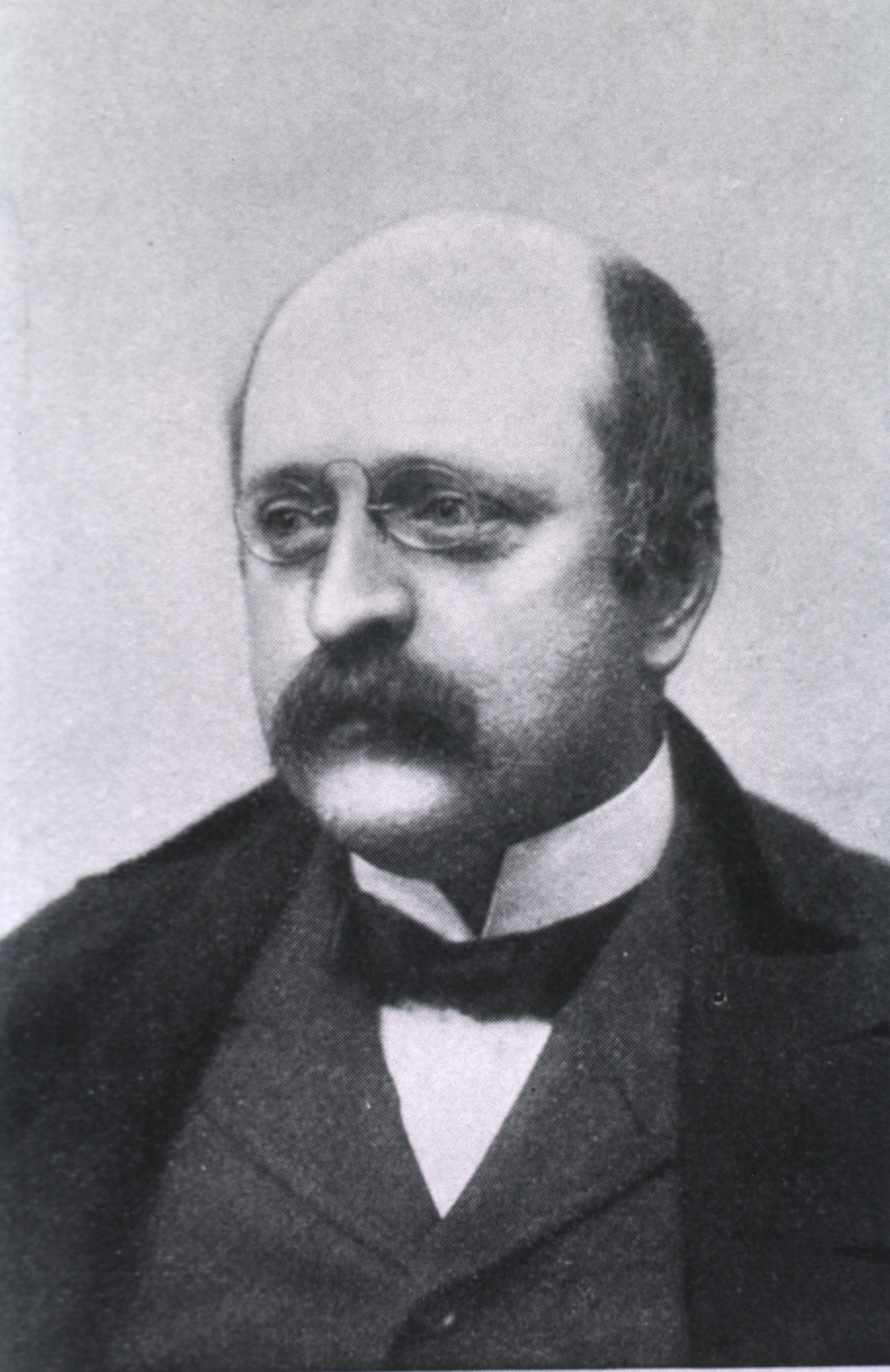
- Born: July 20, 1861; Philadelphia, Pennsylvania
- Died: September 2, 1935 (aged 74); Philadelphia, Pennsylvania
- Occupation: obstetrician

Barton Cooke Hirst (July 20, 1861 - September 2, 1935) was an American obstetrician known for founding University of Pennsylvania's Maternity Hospital in 1892. Hirst was the chair Department of Obstetrics for 38 years until it merged with the Department of Gynecology in 1927 and he retired. He was considered an international authority on obstetrics during his lifetime and was one of the founders of the American College of Surgeons as well as the President of The Obstetrical Society of Philadelphia from 1893 to 1894. He was elected to the American Philosophical Society in 1899.

Hirst wrote many books about his field of medicine including titles such as Atlas of Operative Gynaecology, A Textbook of Obstetrics, and Textbook of Diseases of Women. He is also known for being the co-creator of the book Human Monstrosities with photographer George Piersol. Published in four volumes between 1891 and 1893, this book of fetal and adult congenital malformations was the first large work concerning teratology which was illustrated with photography and one of the last to use the term "monster" as a medical descriptor. It was translated into both French and German and remains highly collectible.

Hirst often lectured publicly on OB-GYN topics. While he often decried birth control among educated people as "depriving the country of many geniuses and benefactors," he was also a defender of abortion when used to save the life of the mother, claiming it was supported by the Bible.

== Early life ==
Hirst was born to William Lucas Hirst and Lydia Barton (Cooke) Hirst. He married Essie du Puy Graham and the couple had four children. He attended the University of Pennsylvania for his undergraduate and medical school work, graduating in 1882 and 1883 respectively. He studied Obstetrics and Gynaecology in Europe for two years before returning to work at the University of Pennsylvania.
