= Joseph Hirst =

British architect

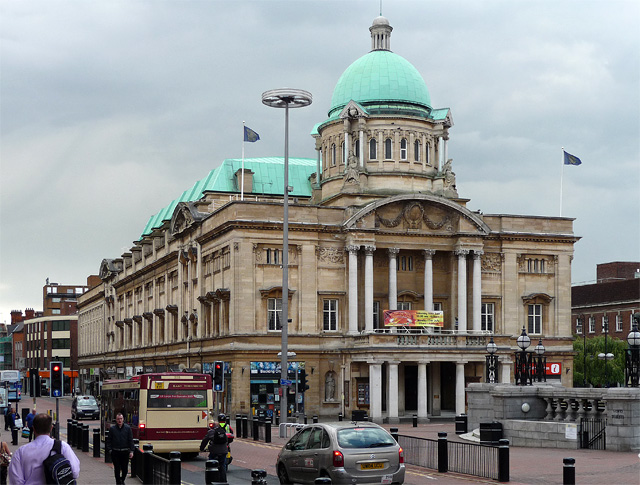
City Hall, Hull 1903-09

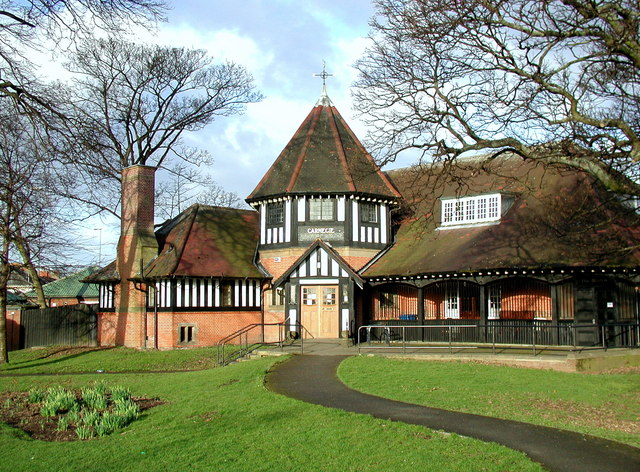
Carnegie Public Library, Anlaby Road, Hull 1905

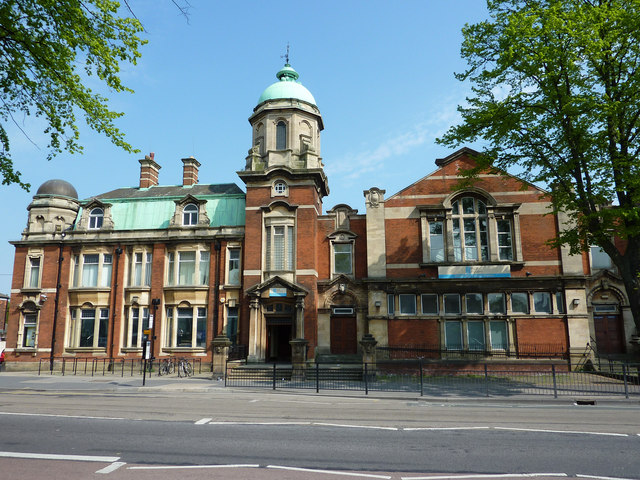
Beverley Road Baths, Hull 1905

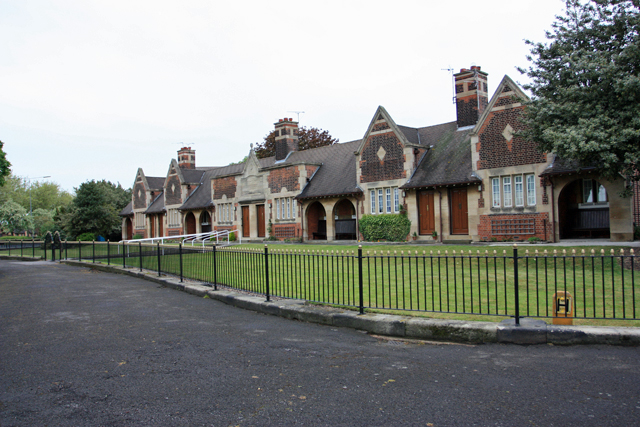
Pickering Almshouses, 1909

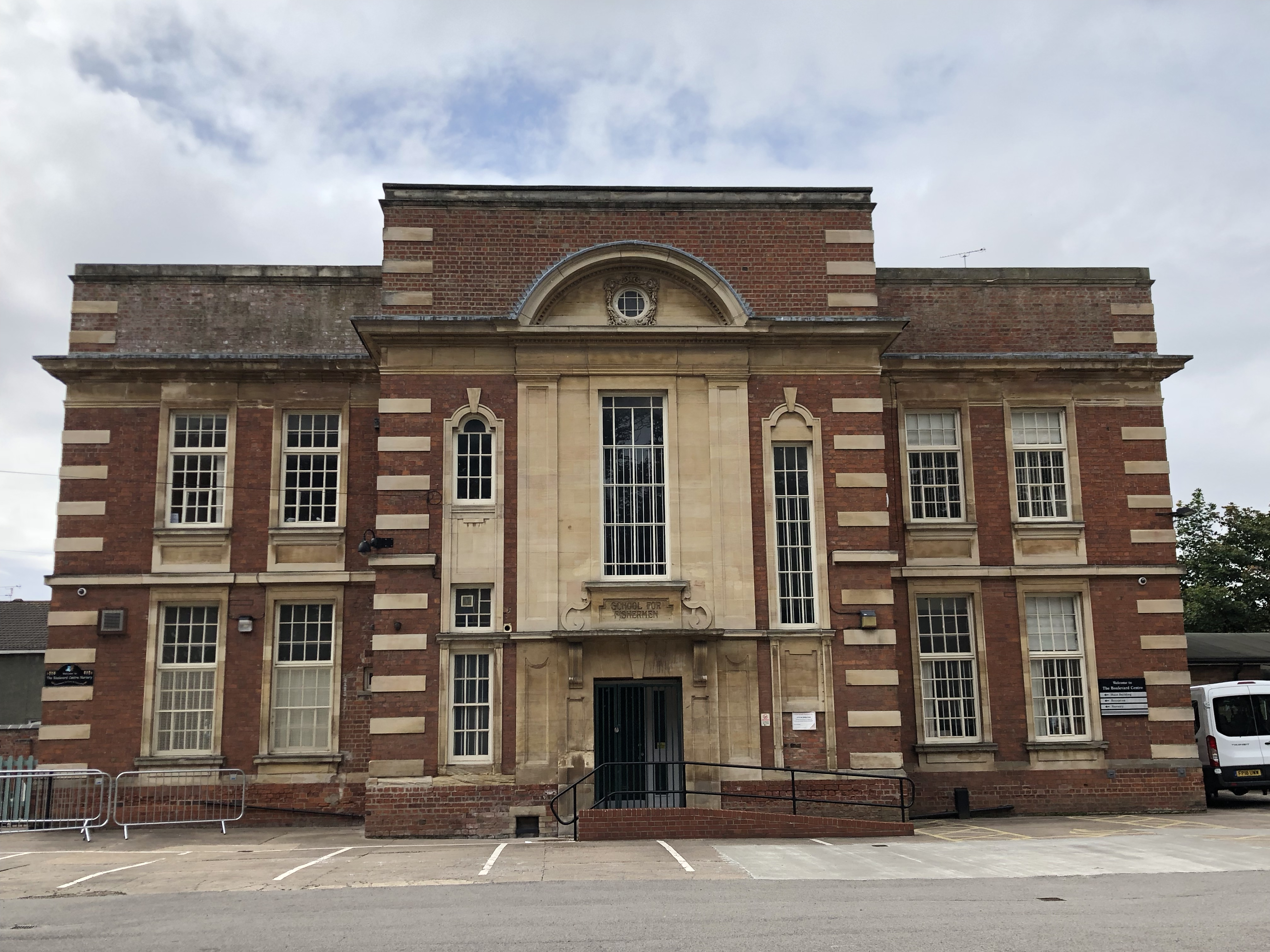
Former School for Fishermen, now the Boulevard Centre, Hull 1914

Joseph Henry Hirst (1863–1945) was a leading English architect of the post-Victorian era based in Kingston upon Hull.

== Life ==
Hirst was born in 1863 in South Milford, Yorkshire, the son of William Hirst (1833–1918) and Mary Ann Carr (1839–1883). He married Hannah Whitehead (1852-1951) in 1890 in St Charles Catholic Church, Hull. They had the following children:

- Captain Joseph Francis Xavier Hirst MC (1891-1978)
- William Leo Hirst (1896-1983)
- Irene Mary Hirst (1900-1973)

During the Second World War his home in Hymers Avenue, Hull was damaged in an air raid. He moved to Selby where he died aged 82.

== Career ==
He started his career as a surveyor under Colonel William H. Wellsted.

Hirst was appointed first City Architect for Kingston upon Hull on 1 January 1900, and he retained this until retirement on 1 July 1926 and was "the man who more than any other designed the face of the modern city". He was responsible for some of Hull's best-known buildings, among them the City Hall, swimming baths, schools and housing estates.

== Buildings designed by Joseph Hirst ==
- East Hull Baths, Holderness Road, Hull 1897-98
- Crematorium, Hedon Road Cemetery, Hull 1899-1901
- Council Houses, Steynburg Street and Rustenburg Street, Hull 1902-03
- Bob Carvers Fish and Chip Restaurant and Trinity Market Hall, North Church Side, Hull 1902-04
- Police Station, 20 Parliament Street, Hull 1902-04
- Empress Hotel, Alfred Gelder Street, Hull 1903
- Lodge, East Park, Hull 1903
- Fountain House, Fountain Road, Hull 1904
- Public Baths, Beverley Road, Hull 1905
- Carnegie Library, Anlaby Road, Hull 1905
- City Hall, Hull 1903-09
- Pickering Almshouses, Hessle Road, Hull 1909
- Sewage Pumping Station, Hessle Road, Hull 1909
- Lodge, West Park, Hull 1910
- Southcoates Lane School, Hull 1910-11
- Sidmouth Street School, Hull 1911-12
- Chapel, Northern Cemetery, Hull 1912
- Museum of Fisheries and Shipping, Hull 1912
- School for Fishermen, Boulevard, Hull 1914
- Newland School for Girls, Cottingham Road, Hull 1914
- Central Fire Station, Worship Street, Hull 1927
- Residences on Hymers Avenue, Hull, near Hymers College

== Publications ==
- (1913) The block houses of Kingston-upon-Hull and who went there: A glimpse of catholic life in the penal times and a missing page of local history. Hull: A. Brown & Sons.
- (1916) The Armorial Bearings of Kingston Upon Hull. Hull: A. Brown & Sons.
