= Edward Hirst =

English cricketer

Edward Theodore Hirst (6 May 1857 – 26 October 1914) was an English amateur first-class cricketer, who played twenty one matches for the Yorkshire County Cricket Club between 1877 and 1888. He also played for Oxford University.

== Life ==
Born in New House, Deighton, Huddersfield, Yorkshire, England, he was the third son of William Edwards Hirst, later of Lascelles Hall, Huddersfield.

Hirst was educated at Rugby School and Balliol College, Oxford, where he matriculated in 1876, graduating B.A. in 1880. He became a solicitor in Leeds. He died in October 1914 in Barnwood, Gloucestershire, England, aged 57.

== Cricket ==
Hirst was a right-handed batsman, who in total scored 778 runs with a highest score of 114 (his only first-class century), at an average of 12.54. He took seventeen catches in the field. His highest score for Yorkshire was 87 not out. His brother, Ernest Hirst, also played briefly for Yorkshire.

== Family ==
Hirst married in 1885 Emily Morton Pollock, daughter of Thomas Pollock of Leeds.
