= Ian Hirst =

- Born: Ian Hirst; June 14, 1989 (age 37) Dublin, Ireland
- Height: 1.88 m (6 ft 2 in)
- Weight: 118 kg (18 st 8 lb; 260 lb)

Rugby union career
- Position: Loosehead Prop
Amateur team(s)
Years	Team	Apps	(Points)
- Clontarf
Senior career
Years	Team	Apps	(Points)
	Leinster	0	(0)
- Correct as of 9 April 2015
- Correct as of 9 April 2015

Ian Hirst (born 1989) is an Irish rugby union player for Leinster Rugby. His preferred position is loosehead prop. It was announced in April 2015 that he had been awarded a senior contract with Leinster following an impressive amateur career with Clontarf FC.
