= Herst =

Herst may refer to:

== People ==
- Alison Herst (born 1971), Canadian sprint kayaker
- Herman “Pat” Herst, Jr. (1909–1999), philatelist and writer of books on philately.
- Jerry Herst (1909–1990), American songwriter, co-writer of "So Rare"
- Richard Herst († 1628), a well-to-do yeoman in England of the 17th century.

== See also ==
- Hearst (disambiguation)
