= Robert Hurst =

Robert Hurst may refer to:

- Robert Hurst (nuclear chemist) (1915–1996), New Zealand-born British scientist and bomb disposal expert
- Robert Hurst (musician) (born 1964), American jazz bassist
- Robert Hurst (broadcaster), Canadian broadcaster
- Robert Hurst (1750–1843), member of parliament for Shaftesbury, 1802–1806, Steyning, 1802–1803 and 1806–1812, and Horsham, 1812–1829)
- Robert Henry Hurst (senior) (1788–1857), member of parliament for Horsham, 1832–1841 and 1844–1857
- Robert Henry Hurst (junior) (1817–1905), member of parliament for Horsham, 1865–1868, 1869–1874 and 1875–1876
