= Hurst, Missouri =

Extinct town in Missouri, U.S.

Coordinates: 37°14′12″N 92°05′13″W

Hurst is an extinct town in Texas County, in the U.S. state of Missouri.

A post office called Hurst was established in 1900, and remained in operation until 1919. The community has the name of the local Hurst family, proprietors of a local country store.
