= Jake Hirst (footballer) =

English footballer

Personal information
- Date of birth: 5 May 1996 (age 30)
- Place of birth: Bad Nauheim, Germany
- Height: 1.94 m (6 ft 4 in)
- Position: Forward

Youth career
- Eintracht Frankfurt
- TSG Wieseck
- TSG Ober-Wöllstadt
- FSV Frankfurt
- TSG Ober-Wöllstadt

Senior career*
Years	Team	Apps	(Gls)
2017–2018	TSV Bad Nauheim		
2018–2019	Kickers Offenbach	29	(9)
2019–2020	FC Gießen	17	(5)
2020–2023	FSV Frankfurt	79	(25)
- * Club domestic league appearances and goals as of 21:48, 3 March 2025 (UTC)

Jake Hirst (born 5 May 1996) is an English former professional footballer who played as a forward.

== Early and personal life ==
Hirst was born in Bad Nauheim, Germany, to English parents from Yorkshire. His parents were tennis coaches, and as a youth Hirst worked as a coach at their tennis academy. Hirst did not know any German until beginning kindergarten. He is fluent in English and German, speaking both with a Yorkshire accent. He considers himself English.

== Career ==
Hirst began his career with Eintracht Frankfurt, but was released by the club at the age of 15 due to problems with his knees. He then played for TSG Wieseck, TSG Ober-Wöllstadt (twice), FSV Frankfurt, TSV Bad Nauheim and Kickers Offenbach.

In August 2019 he signed for FC Gießen. In July 2020 he returned to FSV Frankfurt. During his time at Frankfurt he lived in Bad Nauheim and commuted to Frankfurt.

Hirst retired at the end of the 2022–23 season.
