= Bob Hirst =

Australian rules footballer

Personal information
- Full name: Bob Hirst
- Born: 12 October 1941
- Died: 25 July 2008 (aged 66)
- Original teams: Wesley College; Western Districts
- Height: 178 cm (5 ft 10 in)
- Weight: 76 kg (168 lb)

Playing career^{1}
Years	Club	Games (Goals)
1965	North Melbourne	3 (1)
- ^{1} Playing statistics correct to the end of 1965.

Bob Hirst (12 October 1941 – 25 July 2008) was an Australian rules footballer who played with North Melbourne in the Victorian Football League (VFL).
