= Rajadharma =

Sanskrit for "king's duty"

Rajadharma (Sanskrit: राजधर्म, romanized: rājadharma) is the Sanskrit term for the duty of the king or emperor. The concept of the rajadharma is extensively discussed in the genre of Hindu literature called the Dharmashastras.

== Description ==
Rajadharma referred to the obligations of a king or emperor towards his subjects, to ensure their prosperity and peace during his reign. The Arthashastra and the Shanti Parva of the Mahabharata are regarded to be prominent sources of literature regarding this concept.

The primary duty of a monarch was regarded to be the protection of his subjects, a role that included providing a sense of security for them by punishing criminals such as thieves and other wrongdoers, as well as defending the kingdom or empire from invaders.

It also included the maintenance of the social order, regarded to be necessary for the moral order.

According to the Ramayana, the right to rule of kings and their divine status went hand-in-hand with the performance of their rajadharma.
