= Jane Hirst =

Australian academic obstetrician

Jane Hirst is an Australian professor and an academic obstetrician at The George Institute for Global Health, Imperial College London UK. She is the Clinical Chair at the George Institute for Global Health UK and the School of Public Health at Imperial College, London, and is a Visiting Professor at the University of Oxford. She conducts research in preventing cardio metabolic complications in women after high-risk pregnancy conditions such as gestational diabetes and preeclampsia, and understanding the effects of climate change on the health of women and girls.

== Awards and honours ==
- Hirst was awarded the Australian Prime Minister's Endeavour Awards in 2009
- Awarded UK Research and Innovation Future Leaders Fellowship
- In 2013, received a Nuffield fellowship to collaborate with the Intergrowth-21st consortium and the Gdm-Health development team.

== Career ==
Hirst's research looks at global women's health and, in particular, gestational diabetes mellitus, preterm birth and stillbirth. She is also an Honorary Consultant in the Department of Obstetrics & Gynaecology at the John Radcliffe Hospital, Oxford University Hospitals NHS Trust, UK. Her research interests are in global health, particularly in the areas of pregnancy as an opportunity to improve lifelong health, as well as digital health interventions and AI for women’s health, and the effects of climate change on women's health. She has conducted research and education programmes in Australia, the United Kingdom, Africa, Malaysia, Fiji and Vietnam.

== Selected publications ==
- Hirst, Jane E; Tran, Thach Son; Do, My An T; Rowena, Forsyth; Morris, Jonathan M; Jeffery, Heather E (December 2012). "Women with gestational diabetes in Vietnam: a qualitative study to determine attitudes and health behaviours". BMC Pregnancy and Childbirth. 12 (1): 81. doi:10.1186/1471-2393-12-81. PMC 3449178. PMID 22873351.
- Hirst, Jane E.; Gard, Gregory B.; McIllroy, Kirsty; Nevell, David; Field, Michael (July 2009). "High Rates of Occult Fallopian Tube Cancer Diagnosed at Prophylactic Bilateral Salpingo-Oophorectomy". International Journal of Gynecological Cancer. 19 (5): 826–829. doi:10.1111/IGC.0b013e3181a1b5dc. PMID 19574767. S2CID 6496116. ProQuest 2552822798.
- Hirst, Jane E.; Torode, Hugh; Sears, William; Cousins, Michael J. (January 2009). "Beware the Tarlov Cyst". Journal of Minimally Invasive Gynecology. 16 (1): 78–80. doi:10.1016/j.jmig.2008.09.580. PMID 19110185.
- Hirst, Jane E; Knight, Hannah Ellin; Ohuma, Eric O; Dwyer, Terence; Hennig, Benjamin D; Papageorghiou, Aris T; Cheikh Ismail, Leila; Villar, José; Kennedy, Stephen H (September 2019). "Social gradient of birthweight in England assessed using the INTERGROWTH-21 st gestational age-specific standard" (PDF). Archives of Disease in Childhood - Fetal and Neonatal Edition. 104 (5): F486–F492. doi:10.1136/archdischild-2018-315295. PMID 30464006. S2CID 53715814.
