= Byron Hirst =

American politician

Member of the Wyoming Senate from the Albany County district
- In office 1953–1958

Personal details
- Born: Edward Byron Hirst; June 18, 1912 Grand Island, Nebraska, U.S.
- Died: August 20, 2002 (aged 90) Cheyenne, Wyoming
- Party: Republican
- Education: University of Nebraska–Lincoln (BA); George Washington University Law School (LLB, JD); Harvard Law School (LLM)
- Occupation: Attorney

Byron Hirst (1912–2002) was an American politician and lawyer in the state of Wyoming. He served in the Wyoming Senate from 1953 to 1958. He was a member of the Republican party. He was also a prosecutor in Cheyenne before being a senator.
