= The Scarlet Ibis =

- Short story by James Hurst
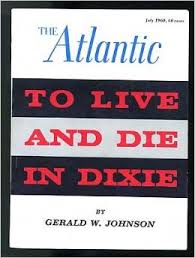
- Cover of The Atlantic issue in which this was first published
- Country: United States
- Language: English
- Genres: Tragedy, short story

Publication
- Published in: The Atlantic Monthly
- Media type: magazine
- Publication date: July 1960

"The Scarlet Ibis" is a short story written by James Hurst. It was first published in The Atlantic Monthly in July 1960 and won the "Atlantic First" award. The story has become a classic of American literature, and has been frequently republished in high school anthologies and other collections.

== Plot ==
The narrator, who is not named but simply called "Brother", recounts the life of his younger brother, William Armstrong, nicknamed "Doodle". Doodle is born a sickly child, who is not expected to live because of his birth defects. His family even has a small coffin made in anticipation of his death, and presumably chooses the robust name 'William Armstrong' because it would look good on a gravestone. Doodle survives, but for most of his childhood, he is unable to move or respond to his environment. Brother even goes so far as planning to smother the baby with a pillow, thinking that having no brother was better than having a brother who wasn't truly there. Luckily, Doodle smiles at Brother before he can do the deed, and, overjoyed that his brother is smart, Brother leaves him be.

Doodle eventually learns to crawl, even though the doctor says the strain of even sitting up might kill him because of his weak heart. He crawls backwards, though, reminding Brother of a doodlebug, leading him to nickname William, "Doodle". But Doodle is still very weak and feeble. Brother wanted someone who could run and jump and play with him, but resents having the weak and fragile Doodle instead. Brother even has to pull his brother around in a wooden go-kart his father built him, because Doodle can't walk. It is now that Brother decides to train Doodle by taking him down to the swamp to teach him how to walk.

Eventually, shortly before his sixth birthday, Doodle learns to walk with help from Brother. Encouraged by this, Brother decides to teach Doodle how to run, climb vines, swim, row and even fight to prepare Doodle for school. However, almost a year after the plan was made, Doodle is far from accomplishing the goals by the nearing deadline.

One day, a big red bird appears in their garden, looking sick and tired. The boys' father identifies it as a scarlet ibis, a tropical bird that was blown off-course by a recent storm. When the bird dies, Doodle, pitying the creature, buries it. Afterwards, the boys go to the nearby Horsehead Landing to continue Doodle's "training". On their way back to the house, Brother has Doodle practice rowing. A sudden rainstorm comes, and when they reach the riverbank, Doodle is tired and frightened. Brother, angry and frustrated that Doodle could not finish his training before school starts, runs ahead of Doodle, leaving the frightened boy behind. When Brother does not see Doodle, he returns for him, his anger dissipated. To his horror, he finds Doodle, lifeless, sitting on the ground with blood flowing out of his mouth, staining his throat and shirt "a brilliant red." The story ends with Brother crying and cradling Doodle's body.

== Analysis ==
The story has been praised by many critics because of its rich symbolism. The scarlet ibis is the main symbol in the story, as is the color red and the ibis in comparison to Doodle as fragile yet majestic. The storm is often likened to Brother for pushing the scarlet ibis too hard, and thus forsaking it. The story also examines the ambiguous nature of pride: "I did not know then that pride is a wonderful, terrible thing, a seed that bears two vines, life and death." Brother acknowledges that pride is wonderful because it has allowed for Doodle to do great and unexpected things but also terrible because his true motivations were not pure and ultimately caused Doodle's death.

== Opera ==
The story was developed into an opera by composer Stefan Weisman with librettist David Cote. The opera was co-produced by New York City's Beth Morrison Projects and HERE Arts Center in association with American Opera Projects, and premiered in the Prototype Opera Festival on January 8, 2015. New York Times critic, David Allen, called the opera "a moving, intense and dignified creation." The opera was produced in January 2019 by the Boston Opera Collaborative and February 2019 by the Chicago Opera Theater.

== James Hurst ==
James Hurst was born on January 1, 1922, near Jacksonville, North Carolina. He attended Booker T. Washington High School in Atlanta, Georgia and studied chemical engineering at North Carolina State College. However, following military service in World War II, he decided to be an opera singer and studied at the Juilliard School of Music in New York and in Italy. In 1951, Hurst abandoned his musical career and became a banker in New York for the next thirty-four years. He wrote plays and short stories in his spare time. "The Scarlet Ibis" was his only literary work that gained widespread recognition, appearing in the July 1960 issue of The Atlantic Monthly and earning the 'Atlantic First' prize that year. James Hurst died in Jacksonville, North Carolina, on October 24, 2013, at the age of 91.

=== Published stories ===
- "August Snow", Prairie Schooner 31.1 (Spring 1957)
- "Seaweed", Southwest Review (Summer 1958)
- "Watchman, What of the Night?", Escapade (February 1960)
- "The Scarlet Ibis", The Atlantic (July 1960)
- "A Cup of Trembling", Southwest Review 46.2 (Spring 1961)
- "Once There Came a Cobra", Transatlantic Review 9 (1962)
- "The Summer of Two Figs", Transatlantic Review 20 (1966)
