= James Hurst (baseball) =

American baseball player (born 1967)

- Pitcher
- Born: June 1, 1967 (age 58); Plantation, Florida
- Batted: Left Threw: Left

MLB debut
- April 4, 1994, for the Texas Rangers

Last MLB appearance
- May 22, 1994, for the Texas Rangers

MLB statistics
- Win–loss record: 0–0
- Earned run average: 10.13
- Strikeouts: 5
- Stats at Baseball Reference

Teams
- Texas Rangers (1994)

James Lavon Hurst (born June 1, 1967) is a former Major League Baseball pitcher who played in 1994 with the Texas Rangers.

Hurst was selected in the 32nd round of the 1989 Major League Baseball draft out of Florida Southern by the Cleveland Indians. He was assigned to the Reno Silver Sox to begin his career in 1990 but was released after one minor league season in Reno. He was signed by the Rangers in July 1991 and spent the next few years in their farm system.

He made his Major League debut on Opening Day of the 1994 season on April 4 at Yankee Stadium against the New York Yankees. He pitched a scoreless inning in relief of Kevin Brown. His final Major League game would come on May 22 of the same season against the Seattle Mariners at the Kingdome.

The 1995 season was his last in professional baseball. He split time between the minor league systems of the Rangers, Baltimore Orioles and Cincinnati Reds.
