= Jacqueline Suthren Hirst =

Comparative religion scholar

Jacqueline G. Suthren Hirst or Jackie Hirst is a senior lecturer in comparative religion and South Asian studies at Manchester University.

She has an MA and PhD from Cambridge University and is a qualified teacher, and taught religious education in a school for five years. She was a senior lecturer at Homerton College, training teachers to teach religious education, before moving to Manchester in 1994.

She has been a guest on BBC Radio 4's In Our Time, in an episode first broadcast on 6 October 2016 on the topic of Lakshmi.

== Selected publications ==
- Hirst, Jacqueline Suthren (2016), "Negotiating Secularity: Indira Gandhi, Ānandamayī Mā, and the Eliya Rajah of Travancore", International Journal of Hindu Studies, 20 (2), International Journal of Hindu Studies, v20 n2: 159–198, doi:10.1007/s11407-016-9189-2, ISSN 1022-4556
- Hirst, Jacqueline Suthren (2014), Sita's story, Indic values series, 1., Bayeux Arts, ISBN 978-1897411940
- Hirst, Jacqueline Suthren; Zavos, John (2011), Religious traditions in modern South Asia, London, ISBN 978-0203802427
- Hirst, Jacqueline Suthren (2009), Philosophy of the enlightenment (routledge revivals) : the christian, Routledge, ISBN 9780415576253
- Suthren, Jacqueline Hirst (2006), Samkara's advaita vedanta : a way of teaching, Routledge, ISBN 9780415406017
- Hegarty, James Marcel; Hirst, Jacqueline Suthren (2005), Fire tongues: narrative patterning in the Sanskrit Mahabharata, University of Manchester, OCLC 643554429
- Hirst, Jacqueline Suthren; Thomas, Lynn (2004), Playing for real : Hindu role models, religion, and gender, New Delhi, ISBN 9780195667226
- Hirst, Jacqueline Suthren (2003), Hinduism in modern indonesia, Routledgecurzon, ISBN 9780415405980
- Hirst, J G Suthren (1983), The teacher and the Avatara : Mediators of realisation in Samkara's Advaitin theology, University of Cambridge, OCLC 59324739

=== Works published for children ===
- Hirst, Jacqueline; Pandey, Geeta (1990), Hinduism, Growing up in ..., Longman, ISBN 9780582002852
- Hirst, Jacqueline Suthren; Sanders, Beryl (1987). The Story of the Hindus. Cambridge UP. ISBN 9780521269001.
