= Thomas Hirst =

English cricketer

Thomas Henry Hirst (21 May 1865 – 3 April 1927) was an English first-class cricketer, who played against Somerset for Yorkshire County Cricket Club, in a drawn match at The Circle, Kingston upon Hull, in 1899.

Hirst was born in Lockwood, Huddersfield, Yorkshire, England, and was a right-handed batsman. He scored a total of 66 runs with best scores of 33 and 28 in Scotland's draw against the Australians. Hirst took a catch, but his right arm fast medium pace failed to take a wicket, while conceding 44 runs. He batted at number eleven in his first game, and at number one in his second.

Hirst died in April 1927 in Meltham, Yorkshire.
