= John Hurst =

John Hurst may refer to:

- John Hurst (American football) (born 1996), American football player
- John Hurst (footballer) (1947–2024), English footballer
- John Fletcher Hurst (1834–1903), bishop
- John Hurst (archaeologist) (1927–2003), British archaeologist
- John Hurst (sport shooter) (1923–2007), American Olympic shooter
- J. Willis Hurst (1920–2011), American cardiologist
- John Hurst (field hockey) (born 1952), British Olympic hockey manager

== See also ==
- John Hirst (disambiguation)
- Jonathan Hurst (born 1966), American baseball player
