= Hearst (surname) =

Hearst is a surname. Notable people with the surname include:

- Amanda Hearst (born 1984), American socialite, activist, fashion model, and heiress
- Anne Hearst (born 1956), American socialite and philanthropist
- Cary Ann Hearst (born 1979), American musician
- Gabriela Hearst (born 1976), Uruguayan and American fashion designer
- Garrison Hearst (born 1971), American football player
- George Hearst (1820–1891), American businessman and politician
- George Randolph Hearst (1904–1972), American socialite
- George Randolph Hearst Jr. (1927–2012), American mass media owner and billionaire
- George Randolph Hearst III (born 1955), American publisher and billionaire
- James Hearst (1900–1983), American poet, philosopher, and academic
- John E. Hearst (born 1935), American-Austrian chemist
- John Randolph Hearst (1909–1958), American business executive and socialite
- John Augustine Hearst (born 1952), American media executive and philanthropist
- Kathleen McCartney Hearst, American triathlete
- Lydia Hearst (born 1984), American model, actress, and socialite
- Marti Hearst, American computer scientist
- Michael Hearst (born 1972), American musician
- Millicent Hearst (1882–1974), American vaudeville performer and wife of William Randolph Hearst
- Patty Hearst (born 1954), now known as Patricia Hearst Shaw, American newspaper heiress, occasional actress, and kidnap victim
- Phoebe Hearst (1842–1919), American philanthropist, feminist, and suffragist
- Phoebe Hearst Cooke (1927–2012), American businesswoman and philanthropist
- Randolph Apperson Hearst (1915–2000), American mass media owner and socialite
- Rick Hearst (born 1965), American actor
- Stephen Hearst (1919–2010), Austrian-born British television and radio executive
- Tom Hearst, American racing driver
- William Howard Hearst (1864–1941), Conservative premier of the Canadian province of Ontario
- William Randolph Hearst (1863–1951), American newspaper magnate, founder of Hearst Corporation, and builder of Hearst Castle
- William Randolph Hearst II (1908–1993), editor-in-chief of Hearst Newspapers after his father's death
- William Randolph Hearst III (born 1949), president of the William Randolph Hearst Foundation since early 2003

== See also ==
- Hirst (surname)
- Hurst (surname)
