= R. Couri Hay =

American publicist and gossip columnist

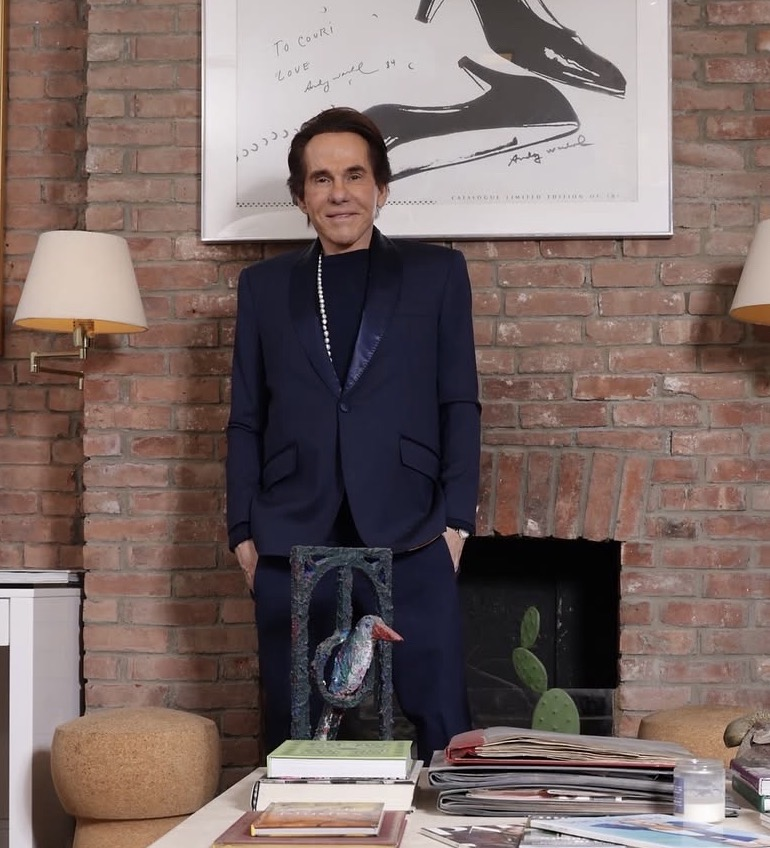
- Born: Robert Couri Hay; Portland, Maine, US
- Education: American University
- Occupations: Publicist and gossip columnist
- Website: rcourihay.com

Robert Couri Hay is an American publicist and gossip columnist. Initially working for Andy Warhol among the original contributing editors to Interview magazine, his reporting subsequently appeared in People, Town & Country, and CNN Films documentary Hamptons, with contributions to Women's Wear Daily and New York newspapers. Recent appearances in documentary retrospectives include Halston (2019) and The Andy Warhol Diaries (2022) on Netflix.

Hay has represented notable media events, including the centennial anniversary of the Juilliard School, 10th anniversary of the Broadway show Chicago, galas for Lincoln Center, the American Ballet Theatre, the Budapest Symphony Orchestra, and the Society of Memorial Sloan Kettering Cancer Center. His list of clients has included Harry Winston, Bergdorf Goodman, Prada, Chopard, Escada, and Bulgari, and Veuve Clicquot. Hay was honored by the New York State Assembly for his exceptional contributions to the world of printed press and the promotion of arts. Assemblymember Rebecca Seawright presented the citation to Hay on December 22, 2023.

Hay was honored with the Leadership Award at the 2023 NYC TV festival for his contribution in film and media.

== Early life and education ==
Hay was born and raised in Portland, Maine. He attended American University in Washington, D.C. According to Hay in an interview with Flatt magazine, he was named after his uncle, A. Robert Couri, a World War II veteran. He studied under Larry McMurtry and had his initial learning from Charles James and Timothy Leary. Hay also did coursework at Georgetown University in 1970.

Marilyn Couri Hay (Couri's mother), was a sportswoman, socialite and philanthropist. She was also the chairperson of Red Cross for the greater Portland area. Hay's cousin Ralph Hay, founded the NFL. R Couri Hay is a member of Mayflower Society and is a descendant from passengers of the mayflower ship including Stephan Hopkins. One of his ancestors, John Hay, was a personal secretary to President Abraham Lincoln.

== Career ==
=== Publicist ===
Hay is a publicist based in Manhattan and the Hamptons. He has been the publicist of notable personalities working with Cornelia Guest, Lydia Hearst, Ivanka Trump Amanda Hearst Peter Max Lauren Bush, Jean Shafiroff and Suzanne Somers. He has worked with luxury brands such as Harry Winston, Bergdorf Goodman, Prada, Chopard, Escada, and Bulgari, and organized philanthropic events for the Society of Memorial Sloan-Kettering Cancer Center, Lenox Hill Neighborhood House, Henry Street Settlement, the Central Park Conservancy, and the Lighthouse International; his work with New Yorkers for Children resulted in the first benefit event after 9/11. The New York Times, in October 2014, noted career milestones of Hay as a publicist and quoted the writer Jay McInerney who called Hay "irrepressible."

=== Gossip columnist ===
He was an editor for Andy Warhol's Interview magazine. Hay starred in Anton Perich's public access television show and interviewed artists like Louise Nevelson and John Cage. Hay appeared on the cover of New York Magazine in August 1979 talking about "The Weird World of Cable TV," and was also on the cover of Cable TV World. The Los Angeles Times labeled Hay one of the interviewers who had the "skill and subtlety to draw... flashes of devilish wit and astute observation, as well as delicious gossip." He was quoted about gossip in Newsweek Magazine. In January 1979, Hay and Zandra Rhodes shared fact-findings on their trip to China with the New Yorker, and in 1970, Hay reported on his trip to Cuba. Hay also began to write for Town & Country and People. The same year, Hay started his own company: R. Couri Hay Creative Public Relations.

Until it was sold late in 2018, Hay wrote a monthly society column for Avenue Magazine (New York) covering the "Hamptons chicest galas and posh private parties to "Happenings in Manhattan and the South Fork." He was the society editor for Hamptons Magazine and a columnist for Gotham Magazine. Currently, he is the Co-Founder & Creative Director for Park magazine and writes a quarterly column titled Social Safari. In the summer of 2013 and 2014 he wrote weekly Hampton's Magazine profiles on cultural icons. He also wrote "Corner Office" profiles in Gotham Magazine.

He has appeared as a gossip columnist on The Today Show, Fox, MSNBC, Extra, PBS, Thicke of the Night starring Alan Thicke, New York City's The Morning Show with Regis Philbin, ABC's Primetime Live, CNN Headline News, Showbiz Tonight, E! News Live, E! True Hollywood Story, ABC World News Now and VH1's The Fabulous Life.

=== Other ventures ===
Hay took on the role of drawing a younger crowd to the American Ballet Theatre and organized a "Junior Council" that acted as co-chairs for the ballet theater's annual gala with Anne Hearst, Cornelia Guest and Count Erik Wachtmeister. By the 1980s, Hay began planning parties at Studio 54 and hosted celebrity parties at his New York City townhouse; one party was Boy George's 24th birthday party. Hay became a partner in the now closed supper club Tatou in New York.

In May 2014, Hay was referenced in the Charles James' book by Harold Koda titled "Beyond Fashion" for a 24-hour "video project" both Hay and filmmaker Anton Perich created. Interview Magazine revisited Hay's interview with Charles James. In the fall of 2014, New York Magazine announced that Hay's collection of Charles James' sketches would be displayed at The National Arts Club. The New York Times art critic Roberta Smith reviewed the exhibition, "Charles James Beneath the Dress," at The National Arts Club saying: "Nothing reflects the complex, sometimes fraught sensibility of the great fashion designer Charles James as completely as his drawings...this exhibition presents 93 drawings from the 1960s and '70s. All come from the collection of R. Couri Hay, a writer who works in public relations and was a confidant of James's late in his life." In 2015, Hay appeared weekly on The Charles James Story, a documentary series on the designer by Anton Perich that aired on cable television every Monday night. Hay's novel Secret Lives was excerpted in Michael Musto’s Village Voice column. Hay served as the president of the jury governing the 15th Anniversary of the New York International Film Festival; he first assumed the role in 2015 Hay has visited the White House under five presidents: Reagan, Bush, Clinton, Obama, and Trump.

== Personal life and family ==
Hay currently lives in New York City.

Hay's family has an extensive historical background, with The Mayflower Society citing him as a descendant of Stephen Hopkins, one of the 41 signatories of the Mayflower Compact. Hay is a direct descendant of US Secretary of State John Hay. His grandmother Alice White was a concert pianist who attended the New England Conservatory of Music and Juilliard School and performed for American troops in Europe during World War II as a member of the Boston Symphony Orchestra.
