= Hearst family =

Wealthy American family

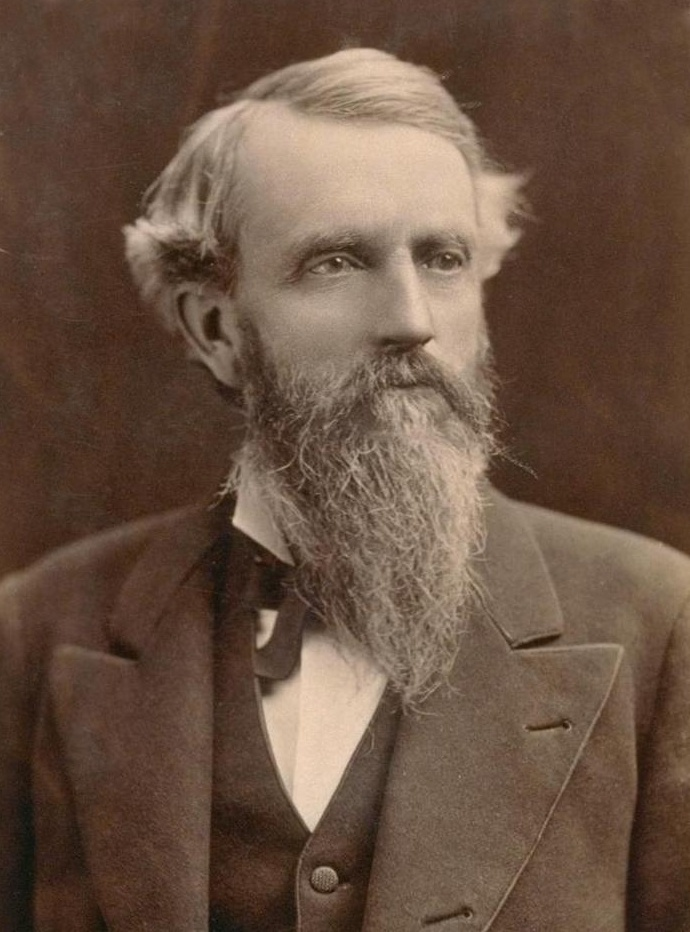
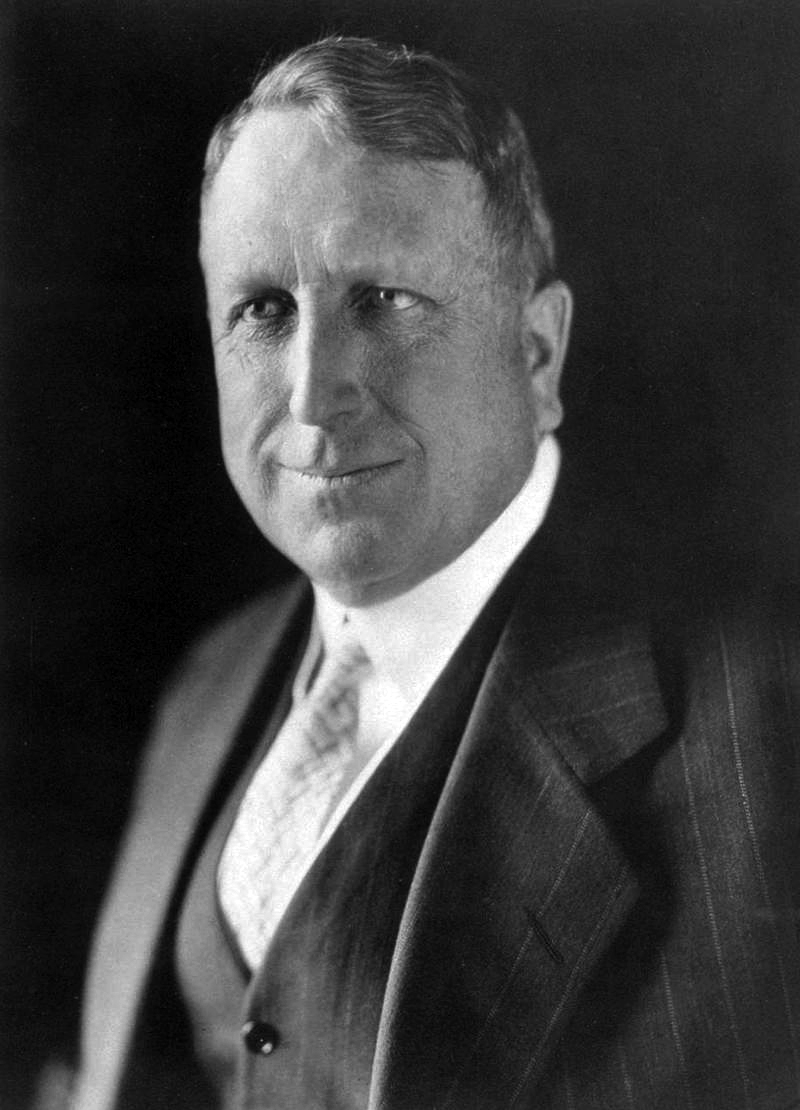
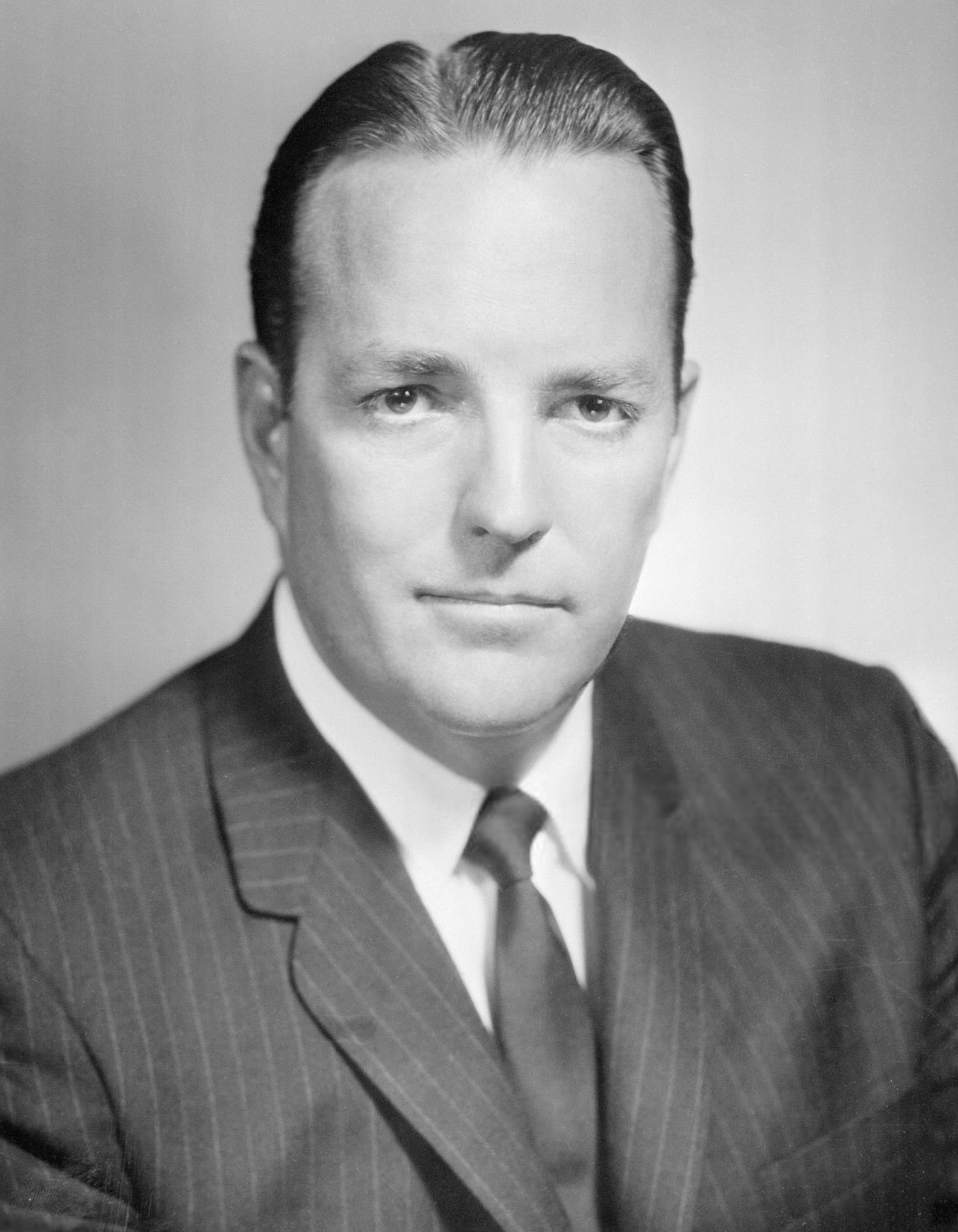
- George Hearst William Randolph Hearst Randolph A. Hearst
- Current region: California, United States
- Origin: County Monaghan, Ireland
- Founder: George Hearst
- Current head: William Randolph Hearst III
- Estates: The Hacienda, Hearst Castle, Hearst Ranch

The Hearst family is a wealthy American family based in California. After earning a sizable fortune in the mining industry during the late 19th Century, the family applied their wealth towards acquiring ownership over numerous publications throughout the country. This network of news outlets ultimately grew to become one of the largest mass media empires in the 20th century. To this day, the Hearst family continues to be involved in the media industry through their ownership and control of the multinational conglomerate, Hearst Communications (alternatively known as the "Hearst Corporation").

== History ==
The Hearst family's fortune was originally earned in the mining industry during the late 19th century through the entreprenuership of George Hearst. Subsequently, George's son, William Randolph Hearst used his father's wealth to buy numerous news outlets including the New York Evening Journal, Cosmopolitan, Good Housekeeping, Town & Country and Harper's Bazaar. By the 1930s, William Randolph's network of publications had grown to become the largest media empire in the United States.

Today, via their ownership of the Hearst Corporation, the Hearsts' holdings encompass 76 newspapers, 250 magazines, and 35 TV stations. As of 2025, the family's combined net worth is set at $22.4 billion.

== Members ==
- George Hearst
  - William Randolph Hearst
    - George Randolph Hearst
      - George Randolph Hearst Jr.
        - George Randolph Hearst III
          - Emma Hearst
      - Phoebe Hearst Cooke
    - William Randolph Hearst Jr.
      - William Randolph Hearst III
      - John Augustine Hearst
    - John Randolph Hearst
      - John Randolph “Bunky” Hearst Jr.
        - Lisa Hearst Hagerman
      - William Randolph Hearst II
    - Randolph Apperson Hearst
      - Catherine (Hearst) Hill
      - Virginia Hearst Randt
      - Patty Hearst
        - Gillian Hearst-Shaw
        - Lydia Hearst-Shaw
      - Anne Hearst
        - King Randolph Harris
        - Amanda Hearst
      - Victoria Hearst
    - David Whitmire Hearst
      - David Whitmire Hearst Jr.
      - Millicent Hearst Bouadjakji
        - Anissa Bouadjakji Balson

== Network ==
=== Associates ===
The following is a list of figures who have been closely aligned with or subordinate to the Hearst family.

- Richard E. Berlin
- Ambrose Bierce
- Paul Block
- Arthur Brisbane
- Stephen Crane
- Marcus Daly
- Homer Davenport
- Richard Harding Davis
- Nelson E. Edwards
- Lee Guittar
- Julian Hawthorne
- George Herriman
- Walter Howey
- Ellen Levine
- Alfred Henry Lewis
- Henry McLemore
- Rachel Newman
- Richard F. Outcault
- Louella Parsons
- Frederic Remington
- Elsie Robinson
- Ashton Stevens
- Robert E. Thompson
- Ariel Varges

=== Businesses ===
The following is a non-exhaustive list of publications and other businesses in which the Hearst family have held a controlling or otherwise significant interest.

- A&E Networks
- The Atlanta Georgian
- Awesomeness
- The Beaumont Enterprise
- Bicycling
- Boston American
- Car and Driver
- Chicago American
- Connecticut Magazine
- Connecticut Post
- Cosmopolitan
- Country Living
- The Courier
- Detroit Times
- Digital Spy
- Elle
- ESPN Inc.
- Esquire
- Examiner Newspaper Group
- Fitch Ratings
- Food Network Magazine
- Gente
- Good Housekeeping
- Greenwich Time
- Harper's Bazaar
- Hearst, Haggins, Tevis & Company
- Hearst Metrotone News
- Hearst Shkulev Media
- Hearst Television
- House Beautiful
- Houston Chronicle
- Huron Daily Tribune
- International News Service
- Jacksonville Journal-Courier
- Journal Inquirer
- Laredo Morning Times
- Los Angeles Examiner
- Men's Health
- The Middletown Press
- Midland Daily News
- Midland Reporter-Telegram
- New Haven Register
- New York Daily Mirror
- New York Journal-American
- The News-Times
- O, The Oprah Magazine
- Plainview Herald
- Popular Mechanics
- Quest
- Record Journal
- Register and Tribune Syndicate
- San Antonio Express-News
- San Francisco Chronicle
- Seattle Post-Intelligencer
- Seventeen
- SFGate
- Stamford Advocate
- The Telegraph (Alton, Illinois)
- Times Union (Albany)
- Town & Country
- The Washington Herald
- Washington Times-Herald
- Women's Health
