= George Hurst =

George Hurst may refer to:

- George Hurst (conductor) (1926–2012), British conductor
- George Hurst (artist) (1933–2022), American leather artist
- George Samuel Hurst (1927–2010), health physicist, scientist, inventor, educator and innovator
- George Hurst (died 1986), founder of Hurst Performance

== See also ==
- George Hirst (disambiguation)
- George Hearst (1820–1891), American businessman and politician
- George Randolph Hearst (1904–1972), eldest son of William Randolph Hearst
- George Randolph Hearst Jr. (1927–2012), chairman of the board of the Hearst Corporation
