= Amanda Hearst =

American socialite, activist, and fashion model

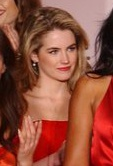
- Born: Amanda Randolph Hearst; January 5, 1984 (age 42); New York City, U.S.
- Education: Choate Rosemary Hall
- Alma mater: Fordham University
- Occupations: Model; socialite
- Height: 5 ft 3 in (1.60 m)
- Spouse: Joachim Rønning (m. 2019)
- Children: Haakon Hearst Rønning
- Parents: Richard McChesney; Anne Hearst
- Relatives: Randolph Apperson Hearst (grandfather); Patty Hearst (aunt); Lydia Hearst (cousin); William Randolph Hearst (great-grandfather); Millicent Hearst (great-grandmother)

Amanda Randolph Hearst (born January 5, 1984), sometimes called Amanda Hearst Rønning, is an American model, socialite, and heiress of the Hearst family.

== Family and early life ==
Amanda Hearst is the daughter of Anne Hearst, the niece of Patty Hearst, and the great-granddaughter of media mogul William Randolph Hearst. Her father, Richard McChesney, separated from her mother before Hearst's birth; she is the only child from the marriage. Hearst is also the stepdaughter of novelist Jay McInerney and a cousin of Lydia Hearst-Shaw.

Hearst attended the Chapin School in New York City and graduated from Choate Rosemary Hall, a boarding school. After a brief stint at Boston College, she dropped out to pursue modeling. She was eventually persuaded to return to school, and she attended Fordham University, graduating in 2008 with a B.A. in art history.

== Career ==
Hearst is the co-founder of Well/Beings, a grant-making nonprofit focused on environmental justice and conservation. Hearst also co-founded Maison de Mode, an online retail platform dedicated to sustainable fashion.

As a former IMG model, Hearst has appeared on the covers of Town & Country, International Harper’s Bazaar, Cosmopolitan, and other major magazines, and has been featured in Vanity Fair.

== Personal life ==
Amanda married Joachim Rønning on August 2, 2019. On June 4, 2022, she gave birth to their first child, a son named Haakon "Hawk" Hearst Rønning.
