= George Hirst (disambiguation) =

George Hirst (1871–1954) was an English cricketer.

George Hirst may also refer to:

- George Hirst (astronomer) (1846–1915), astronomer in New South Wales who was an official observer of the 1874 transit of Venus
- George Harry Hirst (1879–1933), British politician
- George Littlewood Hirst (1890–1967), Welsh rugby union player
- George Hirst (virologist) (1909–1994), American virologist and science administrator
- George Hirst (footballer) (born 1999), Scottish footballer

== See also ==
- George Hurst (disambiguation)
