= William Randolph Hearst Jr. =

American newspaper publisher (1908–1993)

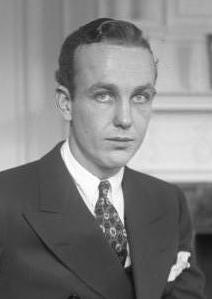
- Hearst in 1930
- Born: January 27, 1908; New York City, U.S.
- Died: May 14, 1993 (aged 85); New York City, U.S.
- Resting place: Cypress Lawn Memorial Park
- Education: University of California, Berkeley
- Occupations: Businessman, newspaper publisher
- Employer: Hearst Corporation
- Spouses: Alma Walker (m. 1928; div. 1932) Lorelle McCarver (m. 1933; div. 1948) Austine McDonnell (m. 1948; died 1991)
- Children: William Randolph Hearst III; John Augustine Hearst
- Parent(s): William Randolph Hearst; Millicent Willson

William Randolph Hearst Jr. (January 27, 1908 – May 14, 1993) was an American businessman, newspaper publisher and member of the wealthy Hearst family.

He was the second son of the publisher William Randolph Hearst. He became editor-in-chief of Hearst Newspapers after the death of his father in 1951. He won a Pulitzer Prize for his interview with Soviet premier, Nikita Khrushchev, and associated commentaries in 1955.

== Early life and education ==
Hearst was born on January 27, 1908, in Manhattan, New York City, to William Randolph Hearst and his wife, Millicent Willson.

Hearst attended the University of California, Berkeley, and was a member of the Phi Delta Theta fraternity.

== Career ==
Hearst was instrumental in restoring some measure of family control to the Hearst Corporation, which under his father's will is (and will continue to be while any grandchild alive at William Randolph Hearst Sr.'s death in 1951 is still living) controlled by a board of thirteen trustees, five from the Hearst family and eight Hearst executives. When tax laws changed to prevent the foundations his father had established from continuing to own the corporation, he arranged for the family trust (with the same trustees) to buy the shares and for longtime chief executive Richard E. Berlin, who was going senile, to be eased out to become chairman of the trustees for a period. Later, William Randolph Hearst Jr. himself headed the trust and served as chairman of the executive committee of the corporation. At his death, his branch of the family became represented on the trustees by his son, William Randolph Hearst III.

Hearst was a member of the Sons of the American Revolution. He makes a brief appearance in the musical adaptation of Newsies as Bill.

== Personal life ==
Hearst was married three times:

- Alma Walker (March 24, 1928 – May 26, 1932; divorced)
- Lorelle McCarver (March 28, 1933 – March 30, 1948; divorced)
- Austine McDonnell (July 29, 1948 – December 15, 1991; her death)

He had two sons with McDonnell:

- William Randolph Hearst III (born June 18, 1949)
- John Augustine Hearst (born October 24, 1952).
