= Collette Lyons =

American actress

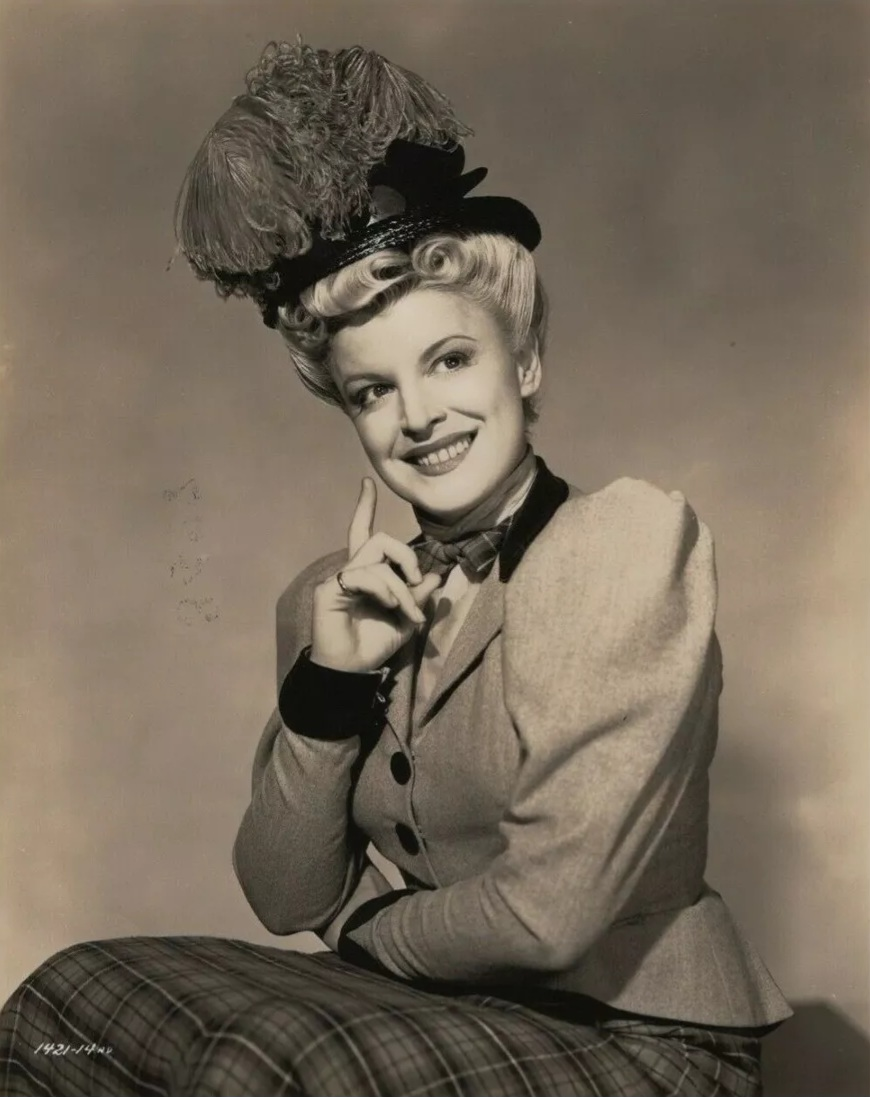
- Lyons in 1944
- Born: October 3, 1908
- Died: October 5, 1986 (aged 78)
- Occupation: Actress
- Years active: 1937–1962 (TV & film)
- Spouses: Alan Dinehart Jr.; (m. 1942; annul. 1950); George Randolph Hearst (m. 1952; div. 1958)

Collette Lyons (October 3, 1908 – October 5, 1986) was an American stage, film and television actress.

On December 26, 1942, Lyons married Alan Dinehart Jr. in Brooklyn, but that union was annulled in April 1950.

Lyons married George Randolph Hearst on March 6, 1952, in Hollywood, California. The wedding was their second such ceremony, following an October 1951 nuptial in Mexico. Lyons obtained a divorce from Hearst in Santa Monica, California, in 1958.

== Filmography ==
Year	Title	Role	Notes
1937	Hotel Haywire	Genevieve Stern	
1937	Dance Charlie Dance	Bobbie Benson	
1937	Woman Against the World	Patsy	
1937	52nd Street	Minnie	
1939	Three Texas Steers	Lillian	
1945	Frisco Sal	Mickey Finn	
1945	Blonde Ransom	Sheila	
1945	The Dolly Sisters	Flo Daly	Uncredited
1949	Blondie's Big Deal	Norma Addison	
1949	The Lone Wolf and His Lady	Marta Frisbie	
1950	Wabash Avenue	Beulah	
1950	When You're Smiling	Nan Doran	
1959	The Rebel Set	Rita Leland	
1959	The Rookie	Parsons	Uncredited
1961	Return to Peyton Place	Mrs. Sarah Bingham	Uncredited

=== Television ===
Year	Title	Role	Notes
1955–1958	The Life and Legend of Wyatt Earp	Rowdy Kate	(Season 1/Episode 5)"Wyatt Earp Comes to Wichita"(Season 1/Episode 22)"The Bribe"(Season 4/Episode 15)"Little Brother"
1958	The Life and Legend of Wyatt Earp	Kate Holliday	(Season 4/Episode 16) "The Reformation of Doc Holliday"

== Bibliography ==
- Marshall, Wendy L. William Beaudine: From Silents to Television. Scarecrow Press, 2005.
