= Phoebe Hearst Cooke =

American businesswoman and philanthropist

- Born: Phoebe Millicent Hearst; July 13, 1927
- Died: November 18, 2012 (aged 85)
- Citizenship: United States
- Occupations: Businesswoman, philanthropist
- Board member of: Hearst Corporation
- Spouse(s): Philip Edward Tovrea Jr. Amory "Jack" Cooke (dec)
- Children: Phoebe "Misty" Tovrea Lipari
- Parent(s): George Randolph Hearst (father); Blanche Ellen Hearst (Wilbur) (mother)

Phoebe Millicent Hearst Cooke (July 13, 1927 – November 18, 2012) was an American businesswoman, philanthropist and heiress of the Hearst family. She served on the board of directors of the Hearst Corporation from 1962 to 1998. She was a granddaughter of William Randolph Hearst. Her twin brother was former Hearst Corporation chairman George Randolph Hearst Jr., who died earlier that year, in June 2012.

In 1949 she married Philip Edward Tovrea Jr, of the Phoenix-based Tovrea Land and Cattle Company. She later married Amory J. “Jack” Cooke, who became president of the Hearst Sunical Land & Livestock division.

She spent much of her life in Woodside, California, and was particularly involved in the equestrian community, including horse-assisted therapy through the National Center For Equine Facilitated Therapy.

In her elder years, she faced disputes with family over the management of her estate, which concluded in 2009 with a conservatorship.

In 1996, she was inducted into the Hall of Great Westerners of the National Cowboy & Western Heritage Museum.

She died in Templeton from complications due to pneumonia.
