= Anne Hearst =

American socialite and philanthropist

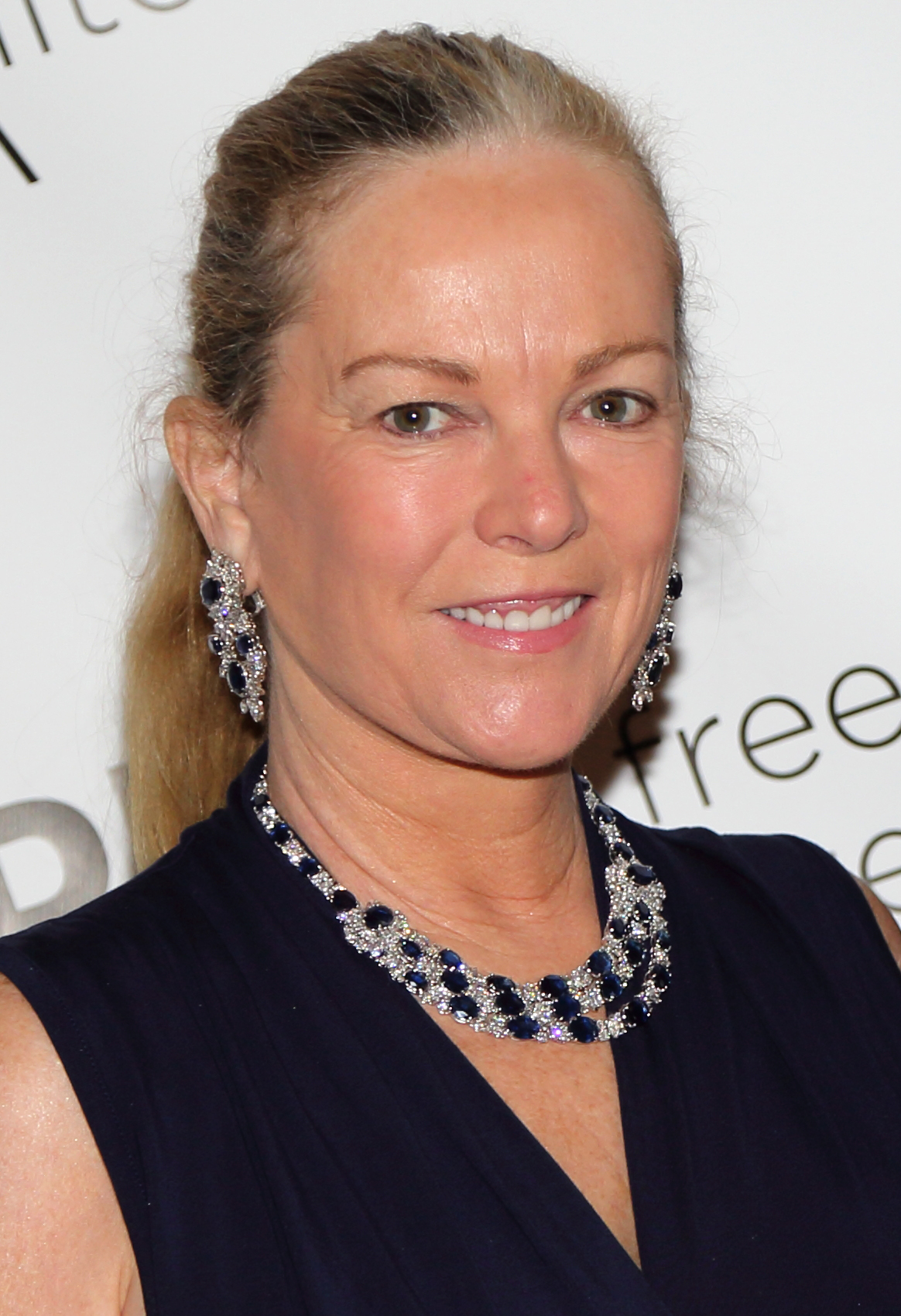
- Hearst in May 2014.
- Born: Anne Randolph Hearst; July 29, 1955 (age 71)
- Education: Regis College
- Occupations: Heiress; socialite; philanthropist
- Spouses: Richard McChesney; King Harris; Jay McInerney (m. 2006)
- Children: King Randolph Harris, Amanda
- Father: Randolph Apperson Hearst
- Relatives: Patty Hearst (sister); Lydia Hearst (niece); William Randolph Hearst (grandfather); Millicent Hearst (grandmother)

Anne Randolph Hearst (born July 29, 1955) is an American socialite, philanthropist, and publishing heiress of the wealthy Hearst family. Hearst is a contributing editor of Town & Country magazine.

== Early life ==
Hearst is one of the five daughters of Randolph Apperson Hearst (1915–2000), former president of The San Francisco Examiner, and his first wife, the former Catherine Wood Campbell. She is the granddaughter of newspaper tycoon William Randolph Hearst. Patty Hearst, who was kidnapped in 1974 by members of the Symbionese Liberation Army, is one of her sisters. She was educated at the Crystal Springs Uplands School and Regis College in Denver, Colorado.

== Personal life ==
Hearst has been married three times; Her first husband was Richard McChesney. The couple separated soon after their marriage, and during that separation, Anne Hearst gave birth to their only child, Amanda Hearst (b. January 5, 1984). Her second husband was King Harris. They had a son, King Randolph Harris, and divorced. Her third husband, whom she married on 21 November 2006, is the novelist Jay McInerney. She is his fourth wife.

=== Legal issues ===
In March 1975, Hearst was arrested and charged with misdemeanor possession of crystallized amphetamine. She was arrested at Niagara Falls, New York, along with Daniel Moffet, one of two other passengers in the car she was driving when the trio entered the United States at the Rainbow Bridge. Both of them were later released on $1,000 recognizance bond. During the court hearing, both Moffet and Hearst said that the pills were hers, and so the US attorney's office recommended the charges against Moffet be dropped. Hearst was also questioned by FBI agents about her sister Patty Hearst, a then fugitive. Although there was speculation that Anne had visited her sister Patty while in Canada, authorities said she was merely driving from Detroit to New York City and the Canadian route was the shortest. After serving four months' probation, the charges against her were dropped, as she had properly served her time of probation without violating any of its conditions.
