= Philip Edward Tovrea Jr. =

American WWII flying ace (1920–1981)

Philip Edward Tovrea Jr. Distinguished Flying Cross
- 1st Lt. Philip Edward Tovrea Jr.
- Born: Philip Edward Tovrea Jr. December 31, 1920; Phoenix, Arizona, U.S.
- Died: January 18, 1981 (aged 60); Phoenix, Arizona, U.S.
- Resting place: Greenwood/Memory Lawn Mortuary & Cemetery
- Occupation: Pilot
- Employer: United States Army Air Force
- Spouse: Phoebe Milicent Hearst
- Children: 1

Philip Edward Tovrea Jr. (December 31, 1920 – January 18, 1981) was a U.S. Army Air Forces World War II flying ace who was awarded the Silver Star Medal for gallantry and the Distinguished Flying Cross for extraordinary achievement while participating in aerial flight while serving as a P-38 Fighter Pilot of the 27th Fighter Squadron. He is credited with shooting down 8 enemy aircraft in aerial combat.

== Early years ==
Tovrea was born in Phoenix, Arizona to Philip Edward Tovrea Sr. and Helen Green Tovrea. His family was involved in the family cattle business in Arizona. His uncle Edward A. Tovrea, known as a Cattle Baron, established the Tovrea Packing Company in 1919, the base from which the Tovrea family made its fortune. Tovrea received his primary and secondary education in his native homeland.

== World War II ==
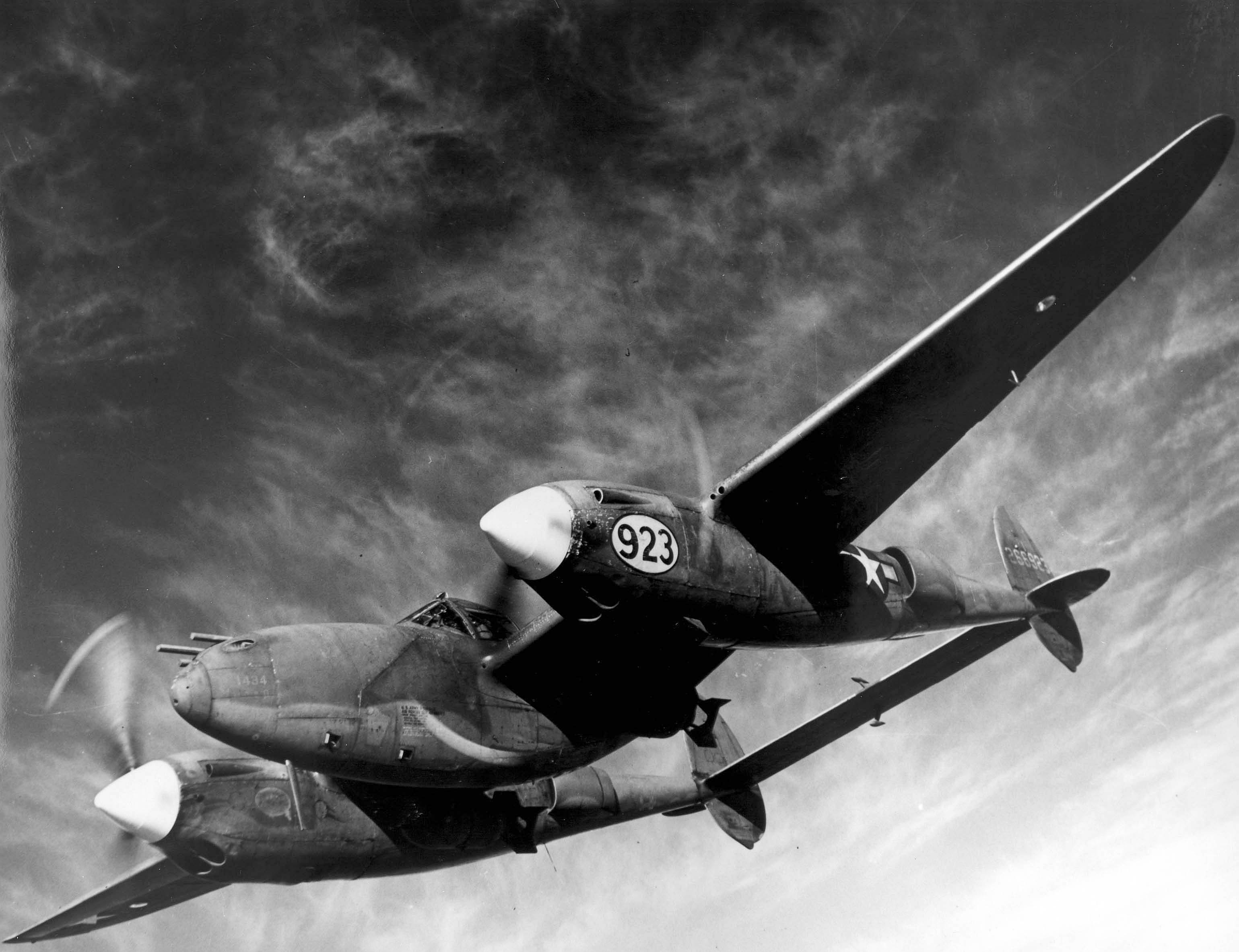
Lockheed P-38 Lightning

Tovrea joined the U.S. Army Air Force the outbreak of World War II. In 1944, he was assigned to the 27th Fighter Squadron, 1st Fighter Group, 15th Air Force in Europe. His unit participated in aerial combat in the Mediterranean Theater of Operations during the war. He was awarded the Silver Star Medal for gallantry and the Distinguished Flying Cross for extraordinary achievement while participating in aerial flight. During the war Tovrea flew a Lockheed P-38 Lightning, a World War II American fighter aircraft built by Lockheed. As an Ace he was ranked 65th and credited with shooting down 8 enemy aircraft in aerial combat.

== Silver Star citation ==
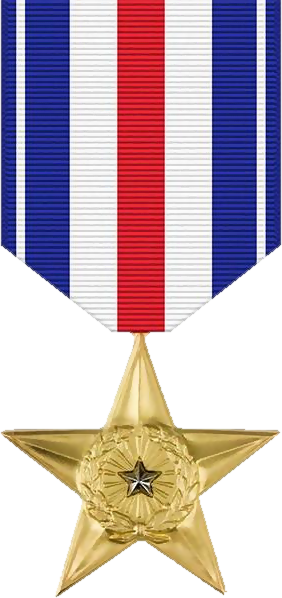

Tovrea Jr., Philip Edward
Action Date: World War II
Service: Army Air Forces
Battalion: 27th Fighter Squadron
Regiment: 1st Fighter Group
Division: 15th Air Force
General Orders: Headquarters, 15th Air Force, General Orders No. 2725 (1944)

Citation:

First Lieutenant (Air Corps) Philip Edward Tovrea Jr. (ASN: 0-758893), United States Army Air Forces, was awarded the Silver Star for gallantry in action against the enemy as a P-38 Fighter Pilot of the 27th Fighter Squadron, 1st Fighter Group, FIFTEENTH Air Force, in action against the enemy in aerial combat in the Mediterranean Theater of Action during World War II. His gallant actions and dedicated devotion to duty, without regard for his own life, were in keeping with the highest traditions of military service and reflect great credit upon himself, his unit, and the United States Army Air Forces.

== Distinguished Flying Cross citation ==
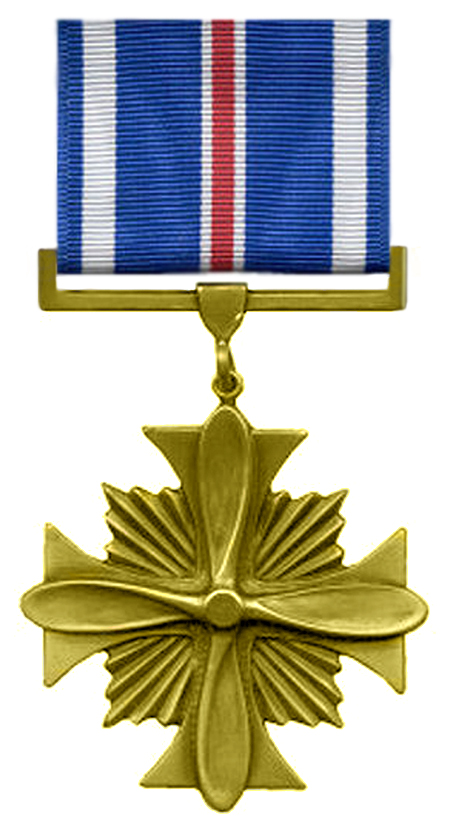

Tovrea Jr., Philip Edward
Action Date: World War II
Service: Army Air Forces
Battalion: 27th Fighter Squadron
Regiment: 1st Fighter Group
Division: 15th Air Force

Citation:

First Lieutenant (Air Corps) Philip Edward Tovrea Jr. (ASN: 0-758893), United States Army Air Forces, was awarded the Distinguished Flying Cross for extraordinary achievement while participating in aerial flight while serving as a P-38 Fighter Pilot of the 27th Fighter Squadron, 1st Fighter Group, FIFTEENTH Air Force, in action against the enemy in aerial combat in the Mediterranean Theater of Action during World War II. The skillful and zealous manner in which he has sought out the enemy and destroyed him, his devotion to duty and courage under all conditions serve as an inspiration to his fellow flyers. His actions on all these occasions reflect the highest credit upon himself and the Armed Forces of the United States.

== Tables ==
American Aces

Rank	Name	WW II Victories	Branch
65	Tovrea, Philip Edward Jr.	8	USAAF

Lockheed Lightning Aircraft

Aircraft	Nickname	Modex	Bureau No.	Flown by
P-38J-15-LO			42-104261	Tovrea, Philip Edward Jr.
P-38J-15-LO			42-104281	Tovrea, Philip Edward Jr.
P-38J-15-LO	Lamonica Plato		42-104xx1	Tovrea, Philip Edward Jr.
P-38J-15-LO	Sweet Sue/Nellie Ann	5	43-28650	Tovrea, Philip Edward Jr.
P-38J-15-LO			43-28734	Tovrea, Philip Edward Jr.

== Later years ==
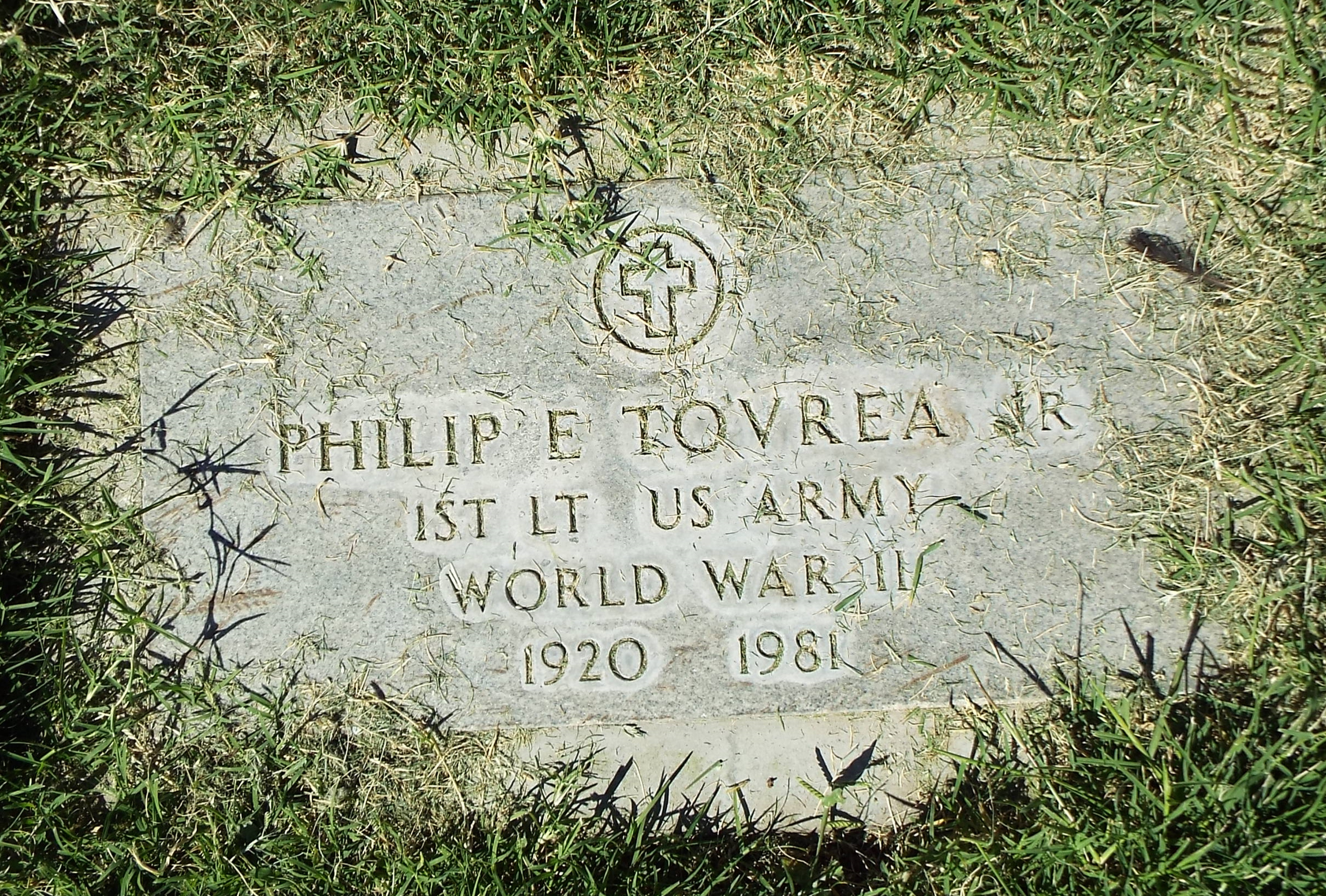
Grave of Lt. Tovrea

Tovrea served in the Board of Directors of the Tovrea Company, a family business, which was later incorporated as Arizona Packing Company. The principal business of the Tovrea Company was operating a packinghouse and buying and selling cattle. He resigned as director on November 28, 1958. He was also a partial owner of the Tovrea Equipment Company, later known as Tovrea Motors. The company sold motor fuel and vehicles to the Tovrea Company.

Tovrea married Phoebe Milicent Hearst (1927–2012), who was a granddaughter of publishing tycoon William Randolph Hearst.

Tovrea died in 1981, at the age of 60 in Phoenix. He was buried with full Military Honors in Phoenix's Greenwood/Memory Lawn Mortuary & Cemetery.
