= James L. Browning Jr. =

American judge (1932–2016)

United States Assistant Attorney General for the Criminal Division
- In office 1969–1977
- President: Richard Nixon; Gerald Ford
- Preceded by: Cecil F. Poole

Personal details
- Born: James Louis Browning Jr. December 8, 1932 Globe, Arizona, U.S.
- Died: January 12, 2016 (aged 83) Oro Valley, Arizona, U.S.
- Spouse: Linda Miltner
- Education: California State University, Fresno; University of California, Hastings College of the Law
- Occupation: Jurist

James Louis Browning Jr. (December 8, 1932 – January 12, 2016) was a California jurist. He served as United States Attorney for the Northern District of California from 1969 to 1977 and later as a municipal, then state judge. He was the lead prosecutor in the sensational case that sent newspaper heiress Patty Hearst to prison in 1976.

== Biography ==
=== Early life and education ===
Browning was born in Globe, Arizona. He completed his undergraduate studies at California State University, Fresno, and his law degree at University of California, Hastings College of the Law.

=== Career ===
Browning was a deputy district attorney for San Mateo County at the time he was appointed by President Nixon to succeed Cecil F. Poole as United States Attorney for the Northern District of California. He served in that position from 1969 to 1977. Notable events Browning was involved in include negotiation and consultation during the occupation of Alcatraz, consultation on whether a statement Groucho Marx made in a magazine interview constituted a threat to the President of the United States, and as a prosecutor in the trial of Patty Hearst, squaring off against defense counsel F. Lee Bailey.

In 1978, he filed to run for California Attorney General, but lost the Republican nomination to George Deukmejian.

Browning later served as a municipal court judge in San Mateo County, California. In 1990, he was appointed to superior court judge by governor George Deukmejian.

He died of complications from a fall in the Tucson suburb of Oro Valley, Arizona, at the age of 83.

=== Marriage and children ===
Browning married a second time, to the former Linda Miltner, in June 1978.
