= Lydia Hearst =

American model and actress

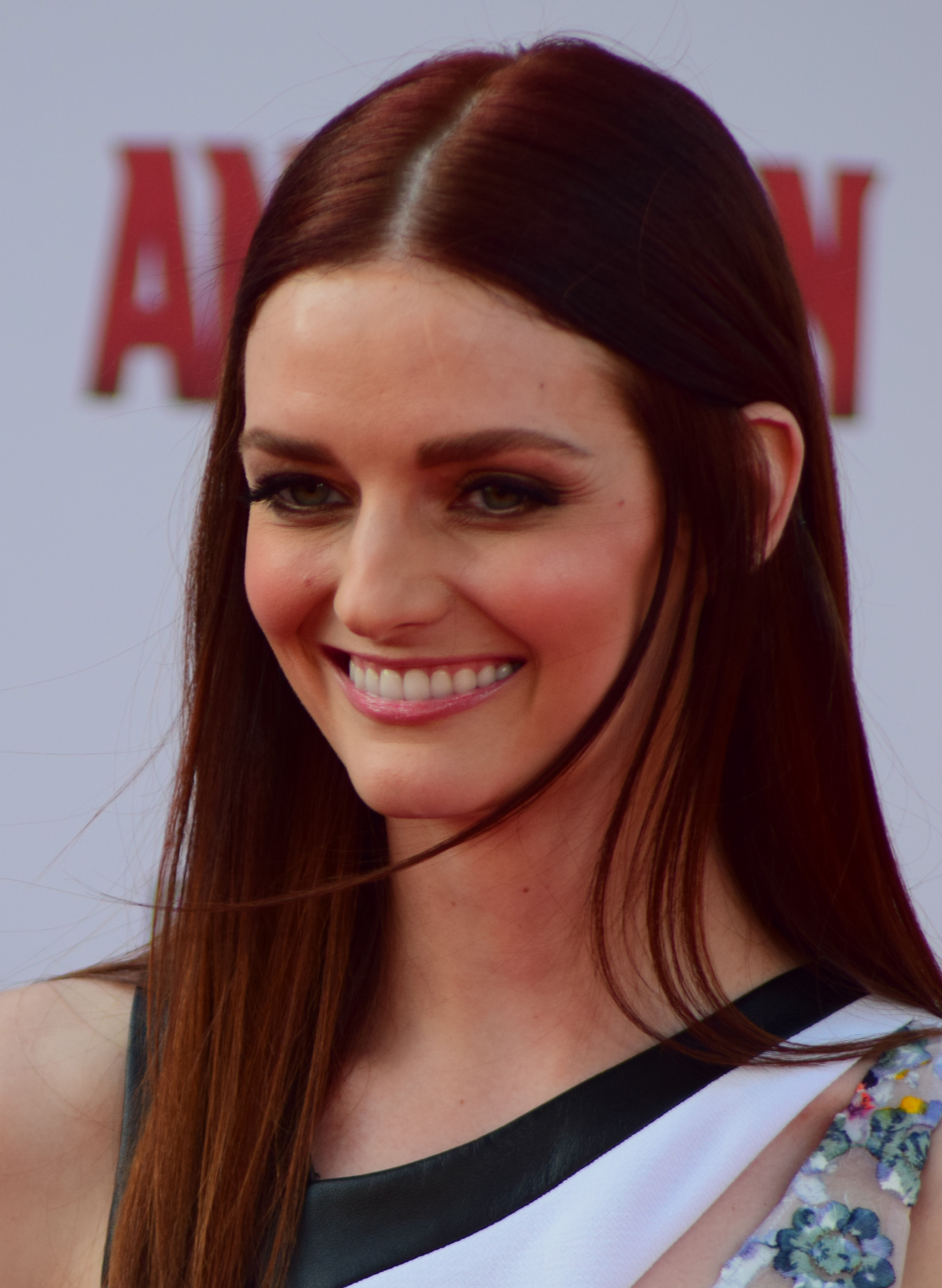
- Hearst in 2015
- Born: Lydia Marie Hearst-Shaw; September 19, 1984 (age 42); Wilton, Connecticut, U.S.
- Education: Sacred Heart University
- Occupations: Fashion model; actress; socialite; lifestyle blogger
- Years active: 2004–present
- Spouse: Chris Hardwick (m. 2016)
- Children: 1
- Mother: Patty Hearst
- Relatives: Randolph Apperson Hearst (grandfather); Anne Hearst (aunt); Amanda Hearst (cousin); William Randolph Hearst (great-grandfather); Millicent Hearst (great-grandmother)
- Modeling information
- Hair color: Blonde
- Eye color: Green
- Agency: Marilyn Agency (Paris); Modellink (Gothenburg); DT Model Management (Los Angeles)
- Website: lydiahearst.com

Lydia Marie Hearst-Shaw (born September 19, 1984) is an American fashion model, actress, socialite, and lifestyle blogger. She is a great-granddaughter of newspaper publisher and politician William Randolph Hearst and a daughter of the author and actress Patty Hearst.

== Early life and education ==
Hearst-Shaw was born in 1984, the daughter of actress Patty Hearst and Bernard L. Shaw, a former San Francisco police officer. She is of Irish and Scots-Irish descent through her mother, and is a member of the Hearst family. She attended Sacred Heart University in Fairfield, Connecticut until 2003, when she began fashion modeling.

== Career ==
=== Magazines and fashion shows ===
Photographer Steven Meisel "discovered" Hearst and shot her first magazine cover for Vogue Italia in April 2004. Since then, she has appeared internationally on a variety of magazine covers such as Vogue, Harper's Bazaar, Elle, Marie Claire, GQ, L'Officiel, and Esquire. She has worked with several well-known photographers such as Meisel, Patrick Demarchelier, Ellen Von Unwerth, Mario Testino, Peter Lindbergh, Inez van Lamsweerde and Vinoodh Matadin.

Hearst has modeled for fashion designers such as Chanel, Fendi, Catherine Malandrino, Nicole Miller, and Jeremy Scott.

=== Advertising ===
Hearst has appeared in advertising campaigns for Prada, Louis Vuitton, Alexander McQueen, Bottega Veneta, Sephora, L'Oreal Ferria, DKNY, MYLA Lingerie, H&M, NARS Cosmetics, MAC Cosmetics, Miss Me Jeans, Moschino Cheap & Chic. In 2007, she appeared in Puma's French 77, after which Puma engaged her to design a line of handbags for their collection.

In Spring of 2012, Swarovski chose Hearst to be its ambassador for its Heart Truth campaign, sponsored by the National Heart, Lung and Blood Institute, intended to raise women's awareness about heart health.

=== Journalism ===
Hearst was briefly a columnist for Page Six, a feature of the Sunday edition of the New York Post. She also ran a lifestyle and fashion blog.

=== Other roles ===
Hearst made an appearance in the music video for the Miles Fisher cover of "This Must Be the Place". Hearst again starred in a music video in 2011 for Cisco Adler's "Song for All the Girls", where she is graphically murdered by a spin saw. She also has a minor role in Johnny Polygon's "LimoSexSuperstar" video.

In 2015 Hearst co-starred in the Lifetime shoplifting comedy Stealing Chanel with Carol Alt, John Rothman, and Anna Maria Cianciulli.

=== Reality TV ===
Hearst served alongside Anne Vyalitsyna and Naomi Campbell as a supermodel coach for the second edition of Oxygen's The Face modeling reality competition. The season premiered on March 5, 2014.

== Personal life ==
Hearst married Chris Hardwick on August 20, 2016, in Pasadena, California. Their daughter was born in January 2022. They currently live in Los Feliz, Los Angeles.

== Filmography ==
=== Film ===
Year	Title	Role	Notes
2008	The Last International Playboy	Stella	
2012	Two Jacks	Alexis	
2013	Delirium	Jennifer	
2014	Cabin Fever: Patient Zero	Bridgett	
2014	Automobile Waltz	Penelope	Short film
2014	The Barber	Melissa	
2014	Desire	Penelope	Short film
2015	Stealing Chanel	Chanel	
2015	Condemned	Tess	
2015	#Horror	Lisa	
2016	Guys Reading Poems	Actress	
2016	All at Once	Amy	
2016	Swing State	Julia Davies	
2017	West of Time	Sister	Short film
2018	Between Worlds	Mary	
2019	The Haunting of Sharon Tate	Abigail Folger	
2020	50K	Chloe	
2021	Grace and Grit	Amy	Uncredited
2021	Aileen Wuornos: American Boogeywoman	Jennifer Fell	Also executive producer
2022	Titanic 666	Idina Bess	
2022	Turning Point	McKayla	
2022	Root Letter	Karen Blake	
2022	Slayers	Liz Andrews	Also co-executive producer
2025	Werewolf Game	Monika	

=== Television ===
Year	Title	Role	Notes
2008	Gossip Girl	Amelia	Episode: "Much 'I Do' About Nothing"
2013	Mistresses	Story	Episode: "Ultimatum"
2014	The Face	Herself / Coach	Season 2
2015	South of Hell	Charlotte Roberts	6 episodes
2018	Z Nation	Pandora	5 episodes
2020	Sinister Sister	Zara Downes / Ronnie	Television film; also known as Psycho Sister-in-Law
2021	Eli Roth's History of Horror	Herself	4 episodes

=== Podcasts ===
Year	Title	Role	Notes	Ref.
2020	The Shadow Diaries	Christine / Lina	Voice role	

=== Music videos ===
Year	Title	Artist(s)	Ref.
2009	"This Must Be the Place (Naive Melody)"	Miles Fisher	
2011	"Song for All the Girls"	Cisco Adler featuring Young Chris	
2013	"LimoSexSuperstar"	Johnny Polygon	
2019	"Ass Level"	Santina Muha	

== See also ==
- Hearst family
