= George Randolph Hearst III =

Newspaper publisher in New York, US

- Born: 1955 (age 70–71)
- Education: Pepperdine University (BA)
- Employer: Hearst Corporation
- Spouse: Christine Sterge
- Parent(s): George Randolph Hearst Jr. Mary Thompson

George Randolph Hearst III (born 1955) is the publisher and CEO of the Times Union newspaper in Albany, New York, a director of the Hearst Corporation and a member of the wealthy Hearst family.

== Life ==
He is the second child of George Randolph Hearst Jr. and Mary Astrid Thompson and great-grandson of William Randolph Hearst. Hearst graduated from Pepperdine University in 1977. He was previously the director of operations of the Times Union and then its associate publisher and general manager. He is the chairman of the board of trustees of the Albany Institute of History & Art, a member of the board of directors of the Saratoga Performing Arts Center and St. Peter's Health Care Services, a hospital in Albany. He sued the producer of the "reality-TV" movie Hopelessly Rich, which aired on VH1 in 2003, over his portrayal in the made-for-TV movie about a con man who had stolen his identity and impersonated Hearst. He is part of the ownership group of the Albany Empire of the Arena Football League, which began play in 2018. Mr. Hearst bought a farm and wooded land near his home in Colonie, New York, leasing part of the land to his daughter Emma, a chef, for her to run a small farm and farm stand.
