= William Randolph Hearst III =

American businessman

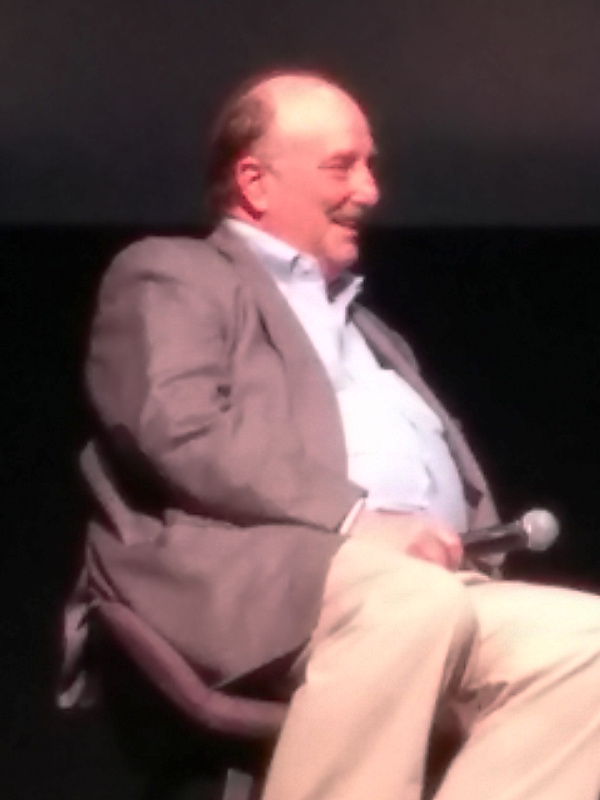
- Born: June 18, 1949 (age 77)
- Education: Harvard University (BA)
- Occupations: Businessman, philanthropist
- Title: Chairman of Hearst Communications Editor and Publisher Journal of Alta California
- Spouse: Margaret Hearst
- Children: 4
- Parent: William Randolph Hearst Jr. (father)

William Randolph Hearst III (born June 18, 1949) is an American heir, businessman, philanthropist and member of the wealthy Hearst family.

== Biography ==
=== Early life and education ===
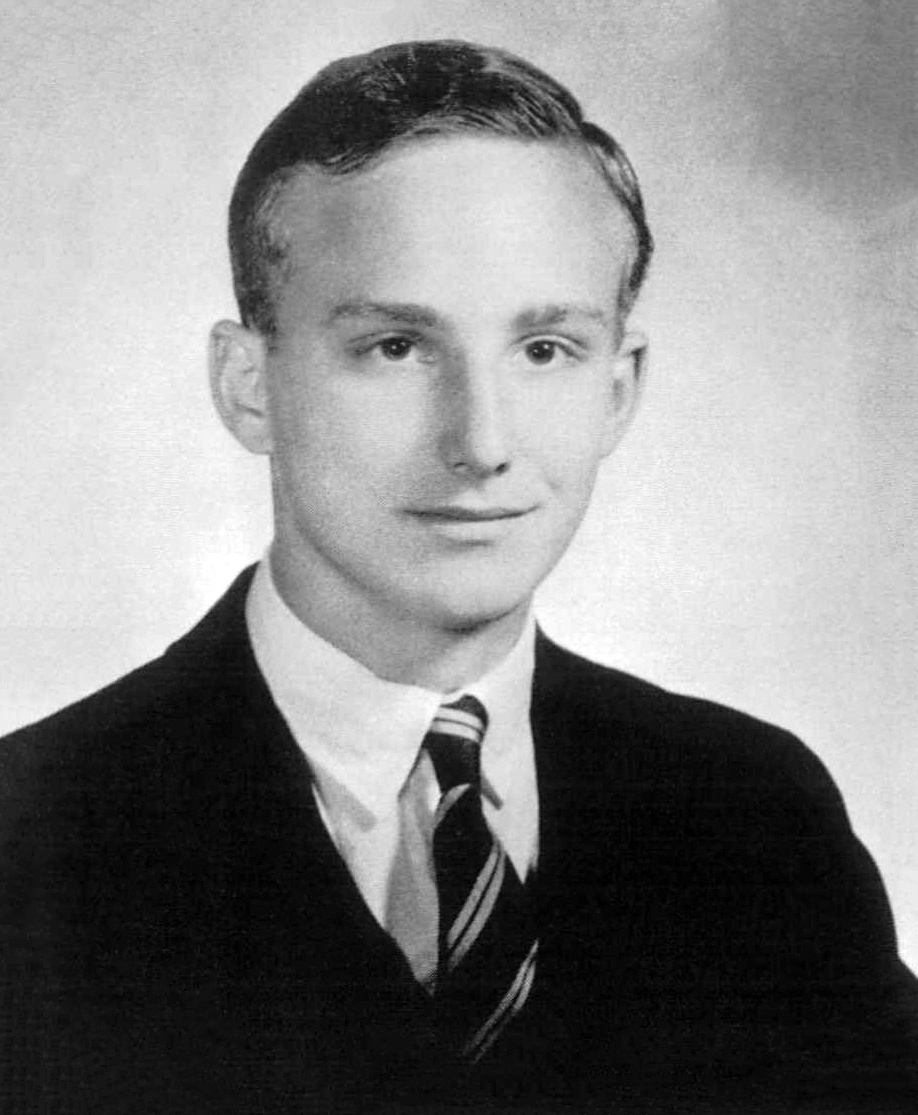
Hearst in 1967

William Randolph Hearst III was born on June 18, 1949. His father was William Randolph Hearst Jr., and his paternal grandfather was William Randolph Hearst. He graduated from the Canterbury School in New Milford, Connecticut, in 1967. He graduated from Harvard University in 1972 with a B.A. degree in mathematics.

=== Career ===
He spent years as an employee of the Hearst Corporation, eventually as editor and publisher of the San Francisco Examiner. His grandfather had also headed that paper, though his father had been publisher of the New York Journal American. In some television commercials, Hearst III was shown having a conversation with his grandfather's portrait. (In fact, he was only two when his grandfather died.)

In 1976 he left the company to become the managing editor of Outside magazine which was then being started by the Rolling Stone magazine founder Jann Wenner. He returned to the company and newspaper work in 1980. In 1992 he again left his job at the company, remaining on the board of directors. The following year he succeeded his father as a trustee of the trust that controls the company and chooses the directors.

In 1996, he was a co-founder of the @Home Network Broadband Internet service with Milo Medin, cable companies Tele-Communications Inc., Comcast and Cox Cable where he served as the company's first chief executive officer. In 1995, he was named partner at the Silicon Valley venture capital firm of Kleiner Perkins. He sits on several boards of directors of companies in which the firm has investments, including Hearst Television. He served as a member of the board of directors of Juniper Networks until May 2008.

Since 2017, he has been Editor & Publisher of the quarterly journal. Alta Journal, and website, Alta Online.

=== Philanthropy ===
He became president of the William Randolph Hearst Foundation in early 2003. He currently serves on the board of directors at The Scripps Research Institute.

== Awards ==
- 1976 Roy W. Howard Award
