= Randolph Apperson Hearst =

American businessman (1915–2000)

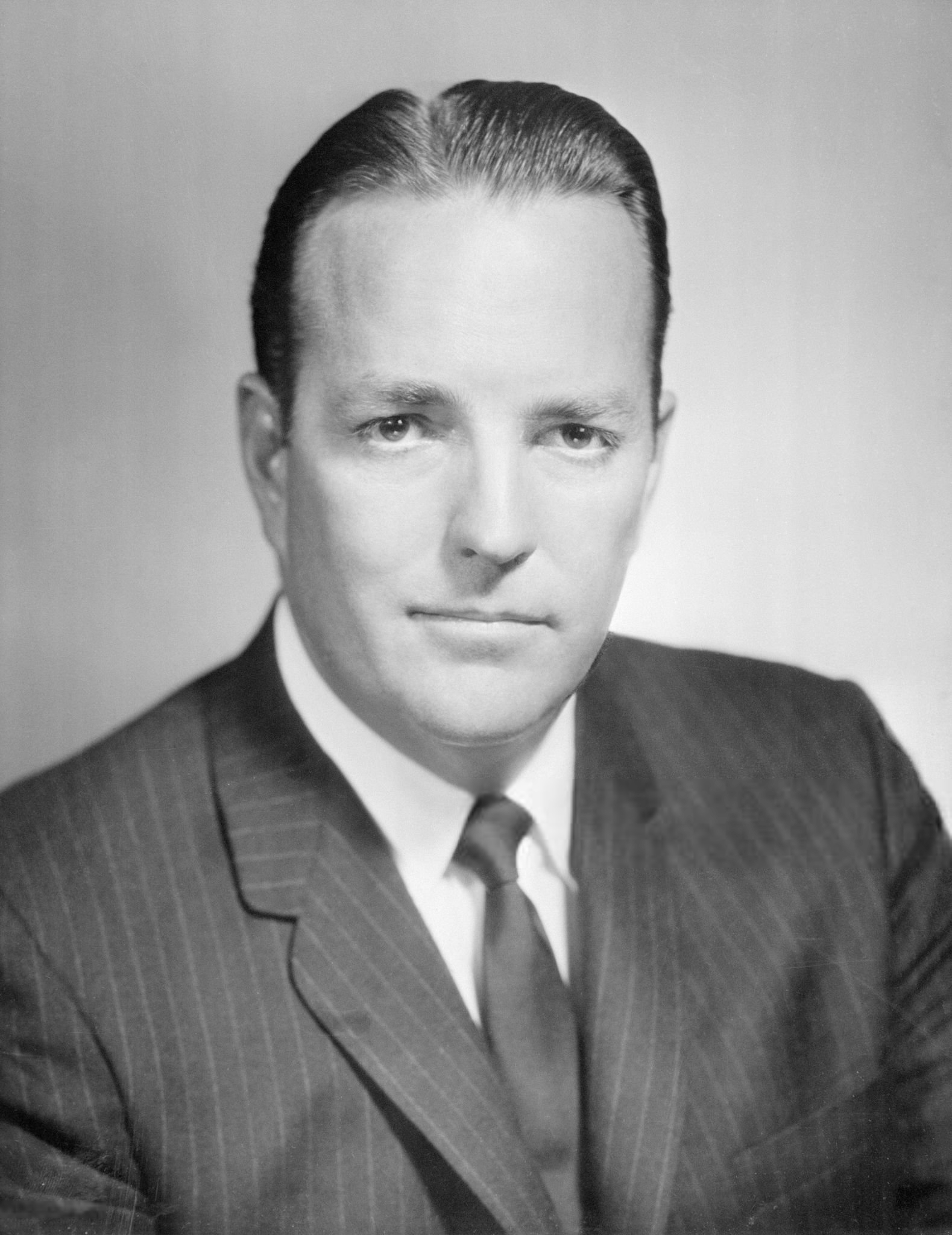
- Hearst c. 1940
- Born: December 2, 1915; New York City, U.S.
- Died: December 18, 2000 (aged 85); New York City, U.S.
- Resting place: Colma, California, U.S.
- Education: Harvard University
- Occupation: Newspaper publisher
- Employer: Hearst Corporation
- Spouses: Catherine Wood Campbell (m. 1938; div. 1982) Maria Cynthia Scruggs (m. 1982; div. 1987) Veronica de Gruyter (m. 1987)
- Children: 5, including Patricia and Anne
- Parent(s): William Randolph Hearst; Millicent Hearst
- Relatives: Lydia Hearst (granddaughter); Amanda Hearst (granddaughter)

Randolph Apperson Hearst (December 2, 1915 – December 18, 2000) was a newspaper publisher and member of the wealthy Hearst family. He was the fourth of the five sons of William Randolph Hearst and Millicent Hearst as well as the father of Patty Hearst.

== Early life ==
Randolph Apperson Hearst was born on December 2, 1915, with his twin brother, David (1915–1986), to Millicent Hearst and William Randolph Hearst in New York City. He attended the Lawrenceville School in Lawrenceville, New Jersey, and attended Harvard University for one year.

== Career ==
After graduating, Hearst joined the family business, the Hearst Corporation. In the late 1930s, he worked for The Atlanta Georgian, one of the Hearst family's papers. After the Georgian was sold in 1940, he moved to San Francisco and worked on The San Francisco Call. In 1942, he joined the United States Army Air Forces's Air Transport Command and rose to the rank of captain. After leaving the Army, he became an associate publisher of the Oakland Post-Enquirer and in 1947, he returned to the San Francisco Call as an executive editor. In 1950, he became the publisher of the Call.

Long active in management of the San Francisco Examiner, he eventually became chairman of the Hearst board (1973–96). He retired in favor of his nephew, George Randolph Hearst Jr.

Randolph Hearst never had the opportunity to become Chief Executive Officer. His father's will established a trust that had five family (initially his sons, then their heirs) and eight non-family trustees. All trustees served for life and elected their successors, which maintained the proportions of family and non-family trustees. The trustees name the corporation's board of directors, and the trust does not dissolve until all grandchildren of William Randolph Hearst alive at his death have died. It was under Randolph Hearst's chairmanship that the chief executive inherited from his father, Richard E. Berlin, finally retired, but the next three presidents were all also non-family trustees.

== Personal and family life ==
Randolph Hearst was married three times, first on January 12, 1938, to Catherine Wood Campbell of Atlanta, Georgia, who was the mother of his five daughters: Catherine, Virginia, Patricia (Patty), Anne and Victoria. Catherine Hearst was a Roman Catholic and a conservative Regent of the University of California before resigning in 1976.

In 1974, his daughter Patty made front pages nationwide when she was kidnapped by an extremist group, the Symbionese Liberation Army, and was soon after caught on film helping the group to rob banks. She renounced the SLA soon after her arrest. The ordeal placed enormous strain on the Hearst marriage, eventually leading to divorce in 1982. After their divorce, the first Mrs. Hearst moved to Beverly Hills.

Randolph Hearst married his second wife, Maria Cynthia Scruggs (née Pachì, September 3, 1932 – July 17, 2017), originally of Rome, Italy, on May 2, 1982. The couple divorced in 1987. That year he married a third wife, Veronica de Gruyter (formerly de Beracasa y de Uribe).

== Later life and death ==
Hearst bought Eastover in Manalapan, Florida, in 2000 from Melvin Simon.

Hearst died on December 18, 2000, from a stroke. His seat as a trustee of his father's will went to Virginia Hearst Randt, second-oldest of his five daughters. He was buried on the family's plot in Colma, California.

Hearst's personal estate was estimated in his last will and testament, written in 1989, at $25 million for probate purposes, but his lawyer (a co-executor of the will) observed that much of his estate—including insurance policies, jointly owned properties, and trusts—was outside probate and therefore not accounted for; prior to his death, Forbes magazine had estimated Hearst's wealth at $1.8 billion.
