= Nelson E. Edwards =

American newsreel cameraman and war photographer

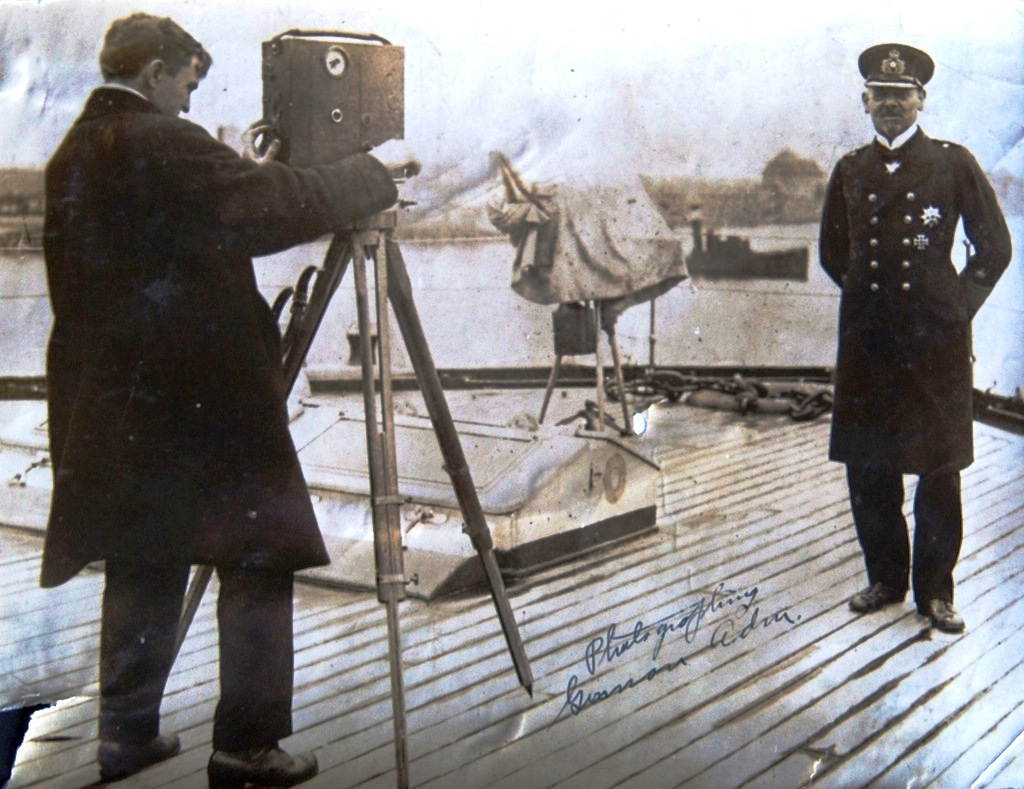
- Nelson Edwards filming Franz von Hipper, 1916.
- Born: November 25, 1887; Point Pleasant, West Virginia, US
- Died: October 17, 1954 (aged 66); Reisterstown, Maryland, US
- Occupation: photographer/newsreel cinematographer
- Spouse(s): Cornelia Fisk, married 1919/1920
- Children: Robert H. Edwards, Patricia T. Edwards

Nelson Elisha Edwards (November 25, 1887 – October 17, 1954) was one of the first newsreel cameramen in American film history. From 1914 he filmed for Hearst’s International News Service. Edwards filmed the Turkish and German side of World War I.

Nelson Elisha Edwards was born in Point Pleasant, West Virginia, on November 25, 1887. The Edwards family moved to Kansas by covered wagon when Nelson was only six months old. Nelson left the family farm in 1908 to learn photography in Kansas City. From New Orleans, he moved to New York City, where in 1912 he was working as a press photographer for the Hearst newspapers. His first major film assignment was in 1914 when Edwards covered the Mexican war. In December 1915, he sailed with Henry Ford’s Peace Ship to Europe and filmed inside the Ottoman Empire and on the Western Front with the German army. While in Germany, Edwards covered the aftermath of the Battle of Jutland and filmed the German Navy in Wilhemshaven as well as the German Naval High Command.

Newsreel Pioneer Nelson E. Edwards - A Life in Pictures (1887-1954)

The German Naval High Command filmed by Nelson Edwards, 1916

On his return to America, Edwards joined the Army in December 1917. He was chief cameraman for Fox News in 1919. From 1923, he started his own photographic agency in Baltimore, combining freelance photography with newsreel work. Edwards covered the early transatlantic flights, as well as Charles Lindbergh’s return from Paris in 1935. He was a member of the White House Press Photographers Association and covered every inauguration from President Theodore Roosevelt to Harry Truman.

Nelson Edwards died near Reisterstown, Maryland, on October 17, 1954, and was buried at Arlington National Cemetery.

== Film work ==
Edward’s work as a still photographer and newsreel cameraman covers almost half a century. A tall, muscular man with prominent cheekbones and thick black hair, Nelson Edwards was among the first pioneering newsreel cameramen in the United States. His personal papers and scrapbooks, which contain early American newsreel information, are still in the family collection.

While preparing their book American Cinematographers in the Great War, film historians Cooper C. Graham and Ron van Dopperen researched Edwards’ life and work, based on these personal family documents, as well as files at the German archives.

In 2012, a detailed military report on Edwards’ film work at the Western Front was discovered by the authors in the Federal Archives in Berlin.

In February 2016, a list of movie scenes shot by Edwards, showing the German Navy and close ups of Admirals Reinhard Scheer and Franz von Hipper, was found at the Military Archives in Freiburg, Germany. The historical footage was taken in June 1916, shortly after the battle of Jutland. Segments from this film report were also retrieved by the authors in the Grinberg Film Collection. The intertitle introducing the scene showing Admiral Scheer boarding his flag ship - a very short flash on film - has a reference to the Hearst International News Pictorial, the newsreel Edwards worked for, and ample evidence that he actually shot these historical scenes.

In 2018, newsreel footage from the German Messter film studio, that was probably shot by Edwards, was found by the authors, showing a visit by Field Marshal Von Mackensen to Turkey in 1916.

== Sources ==
- Kevin Brownlow,The War, the West and the Wilderness (New York/London, 1979)
- Graham, Cooper C.; van Dopperen, Ron (2012). "Nelson Edwards and the Newsreels: An American Life". Film History. 24 (3): 260–280]. doi:10.2979/filmhistory.24.3.260. S2CID 191563252. {{Project MUSE485877}}.
- James W. Castellan, Ron van Dopperen, Cooper C. Graham, American Cinematographers in the Great War, 1914-1918 (New Barnet, 2014) https://doi.org/10.2307%2Fj.ctt1bmzn8c
- Book review "American Cinematographers in the Great War, 1914-1914" Historical Journal of Film, Radio & Television (2016)
- Letter by Nelson Edwards on the biography of his family, 11 February 1947
- Weblog on the American Films and Cinematographers of World War I, 2013-2018
- "German Naval High Command after the Battle of Jutland", shot by Nelson E. Edwards (newsreel footage from Hearst-International News Pictorial, 1916)
- Movie Trailer "American Cinematographers in the Great War, 1914-1918"
