= John Randolph Hearst =

American business executive (1909–1958)

- Born: September 26, 1909
- Died: November 13, 1958 (aged 49); Virgin Islands
- Employer: Hearst Corporation
- Spouses: Dorothy Hart Hearst; Gretchen Wilson Hearst; Fanne Wade Hearst
- Children: 4, including William Randolph Hearst II
- Parent(s): William Randolph Hearst; Millicent Hearst

John Randolph Hearst (1909–1958) was an American business executive and the third son of William Randolph Hearst.

== Career ==
Hearst, like his brothers, worked for the Hearst Corporation and was said to have the most executive talent among the sons of William Randolph Hearst. Any question of his rivaling the non-family executives who constituted a majority of the trustees of his father's will, however, was rendered moot when he died of a heart attack at the age of 49 while in the Virgin Islands.

== Life ==
=== Marriages ===
==== Dorothy Hart Hearst ====
Hearst's first marriage was to Dorothy Hart Hearst. Their marriage ended after Hart divorced and sued him in 1932, citing "extreme cruelty" from Hearst.

==== Gretchen Wilson Hearst ====
Hearst's second marriage was to Gretchen Wilson Hearst. Their marriage was short lived, and ended in 1938 when Wilson divorced him and won custody of their son, John Randolph Hearst Jr. (Wilson later married Woolworth Donahue (Jessie May Woolworth Donahue's son).

==== Fanne Wade Hearst ====
Hearst remarried for a final time to Fanne Wade Hearst, and in 1946, the couple purchased the former estate of Henry Anderson in Flower Hill, New York.

=== Children ===
Hearst had four children, including John Jr., who served as a company executive and director who represented this branch of the family among the trustees.
