= George Randolph Hearst Jr. =

American businessman (1927–2012)

- Born: July 13, 1927; San Francisco, California
- Died: June 25, 2012 (aged 84); Palo Alto, California
- Citizenship: United States
- Occupation(s): Chairman, Hearst Corporation
- Spouse: Mary Thompson (m. 1952; div. 1969)
- Children: 4, including George Randolph III
- Parent: George Randolph Hearst (father)
- Relatives: William Randolph Hearst (grandfather); Millicent Hearst (grandmother)

George Randolph Hearst Jr. (July 13, 1927 – June 25, 2012) was an American businessman and member of the wealthy Hearst family. He served as the chairman of the board of the Hearst Corporation from 1996 through to his death in 2012, succeeding his uncle Randolph Apperson Hearst. He was a director at the company for over forty years.

== Life ==
Hearst Jr. and his twin sister Phoebe were born July 13, 1927, in San Francisco, California. Hearst first joined the Naval Air Corps. Later, he joined the United States Army and served in the Korean War.

In 1948, he joined the advertising staff of the Los Angeles Examiner, which his grandfather had founded in 1903, then worked for several years at the family-run San Francisco Examiner. In 1957, he was named business manager of the Los Angeles Herald-Express and three years later was made publisher. In 1967, while publisher of the Herald Examiner, Hearst felt pressure from the growing workers unions and "was determined to break them." The strikes by the unions lasted until 1977 by which point circulation of the paper had been cut in half to 330,000 and advertising had evaporated, partly because of aggressive tactics by organized labor; the paper never fully recovered.

That same year, Hearst joined the Hearst Corporation, where he would spend the rest of his career. Non-family executives are a majority on the trust that controls the corporation, and this trust will not dissolve until all grandchildren alive at the death of William Randolph Hearst have died. George Jr. was one of the oldest grandchildren. However, there are five family seats among the 13 trustees, and George represented his branch of the family.

Hearst Jr. died in Palo Alto, California at age 84 following complications from a stroke.

== Children ==
He married Mary Thompson (born 1931) in 1951, and they had four children, all born in California. They divorced in 1969.

- Mary Astrid Hearst (1953–2004), born in Santa Monica, daughters Shannon and Alexis, later married Randy Ives, died at San Simeon, California, of cancer; known as "Bunny"
- George Randolph Hearst III (born 1955)
- Stephen Thompson Hearst (born 1956)
- Erin Wilbur Hearst (born 1959), married a Mr. Knudsen
