= George Randolph Hearst =

American businessman (1904–1972)

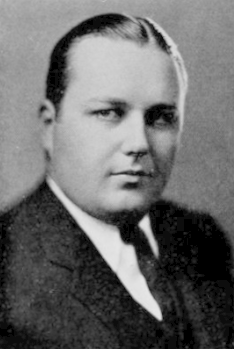
- Born: April 23, 1904; Washington, D.C., U.S.
- Died: January 26, 1972 (aged 67); Loma Linda, California, U.S.
- Employer: Hearst Corporation
- Spouses: Blanche Wilbur; Lora Velie; Sally Alvarez Kirkham; Collette Lyons (m. 1952; div. 1958)
- Children: George Randolph Hearst Jr. Phoebe Hearst Cooke
- Parent(s): William Randolph Hearst; Millicent Hearst

George Randolph Hearst Sr. (April 23, 1904 – January 26, 1972) was an American heir and media executive. He was the son of media magnate William Randolph Hearst, and the vice president of the Hearst Corporation.

== Early life ==
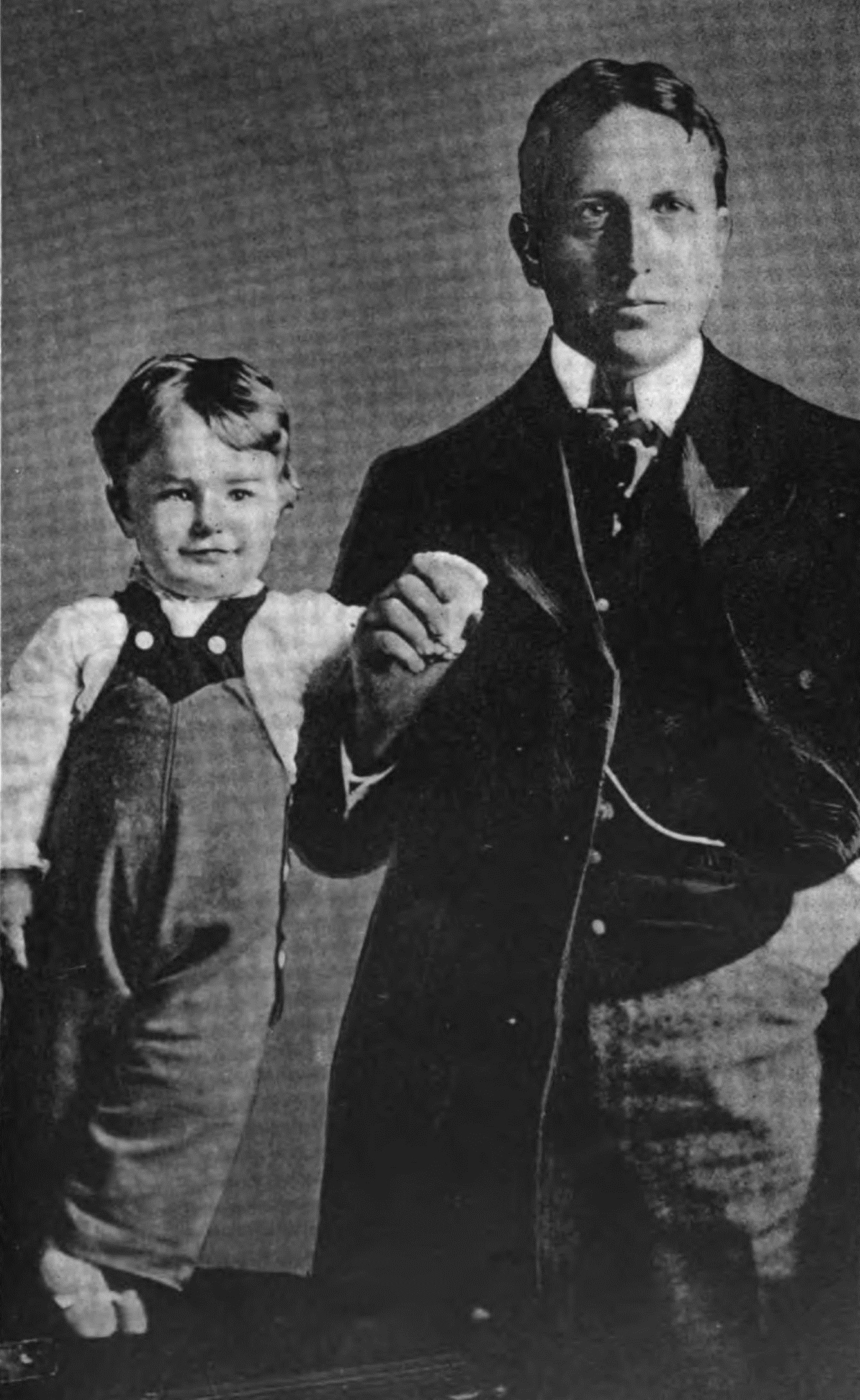
George Randolph Hearst with his father (1905)

Hearst was born on April 23, 1904. He was the eldest son of newspaper magnate William Randolph Hearst.

== Career ==
Hearst first worked in advertising for The San Francisco Examiner from 1924 to 1928, when he became its publisher. He was appointed as the president of The New York American in 1929, and he was the vice president of the Los Angeles Examiner from 1932 to 1953.

Though he never held a title higher than Vice-President at the Hearst Corporation, he was listed above many with higher-sounding titles when executives were listed in the company's publications. Hearst was one of the five family trustees of the trust established under his father's will (this ensured that eight non-family trustees would have majority control of the corporation). In the 1950s Hearst Sr. secured a seat on the corporation's board for his son, George Randolph Hearst Jr.

== Personal life, death and legacy ==
Hearst was married several times. He married and divorced Blanche Wilbur, Lora Velie, and Sally Alvarez Kirkham. Another marriage, to actress Sandra Rambeau, was annulled. Hearst married his fourth wife, actress Collette Lyons, twice because their first wedding in Mexico was invalid as Hearst was still married to Sally. They had twins, a son and a daughter. Hearst was an amateur aviator. Hearst's last marriage was to Rosalie May Wynn born in Oklahoma City. They had a home in Palm Springs and were active philanthropists.

Hearst died on January 26, 1972, in Loma Linda, California. The California Senate passed a resolution in his memory sponsored by Sen. Gordon Cologne on February 2, 1972.

After his death in 1972, his son succeeded him as a trustee. He served as chairman of the corporation's board from 1996 until his death in 2012.
