= Millicent Hearst =

Wife of William Randolph Hearst (1882–1974)

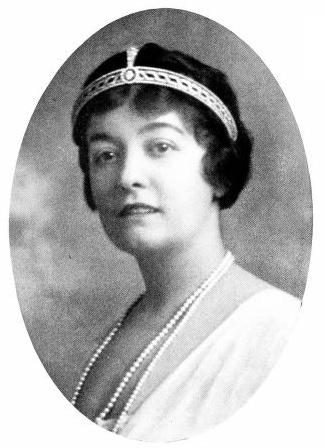
- Millicent Hearst, 1916
- Born: Millicent Veronica Willson; July 16, 1882; New York City, U.S.
- Died: December 5, 1974 (aged 92); New York City, U.S.
- Resting place: Woodlawn Cemetery (Bronx, New York)
- Occupations: Performer, socialite, philanthropist, owner of Hearst Corporation
- Spouse: William Randolph Hearst (m. 1903; sep. 1926)
- Children: George; William Jr.; John; Randolph; David
- Parent(s): George Willson; Hannah Murray Willson
- Relatives: Anita Willson (older sister)

Millicent Veronica Hearst (née Willson; July 16, 1882 – December 5, 1974) was the wife of media tycoon William Randolph Hearst. Willson was a vaudeville performer in New York City whom Hearst admired, and they married in 1903. The couple had five sons, but began to drift apart in the mid-1920s, when Millicent became tired of her husband's longtime affair with actress Marion Davies.

== Life and career ==
Millicent was the daughter of vaudevillian George Willson and Hannah Murray Willson. Following in their father's footsteps, Millicent and her older sister Anita performed at the Herald Square Theater on Broadway in 1897 as "bicycle girls" in Edward Rice's The Girl from Paris. Fourteen-year-old Millicent caught the eye of the 34-year-old W.R. Hearst, and their first dates were chaperoned by her sister Anita. After a six-year courtship, the publisher and aspiring politician Hearst married 20-year-old Millicent Willson on April 28, 1903.

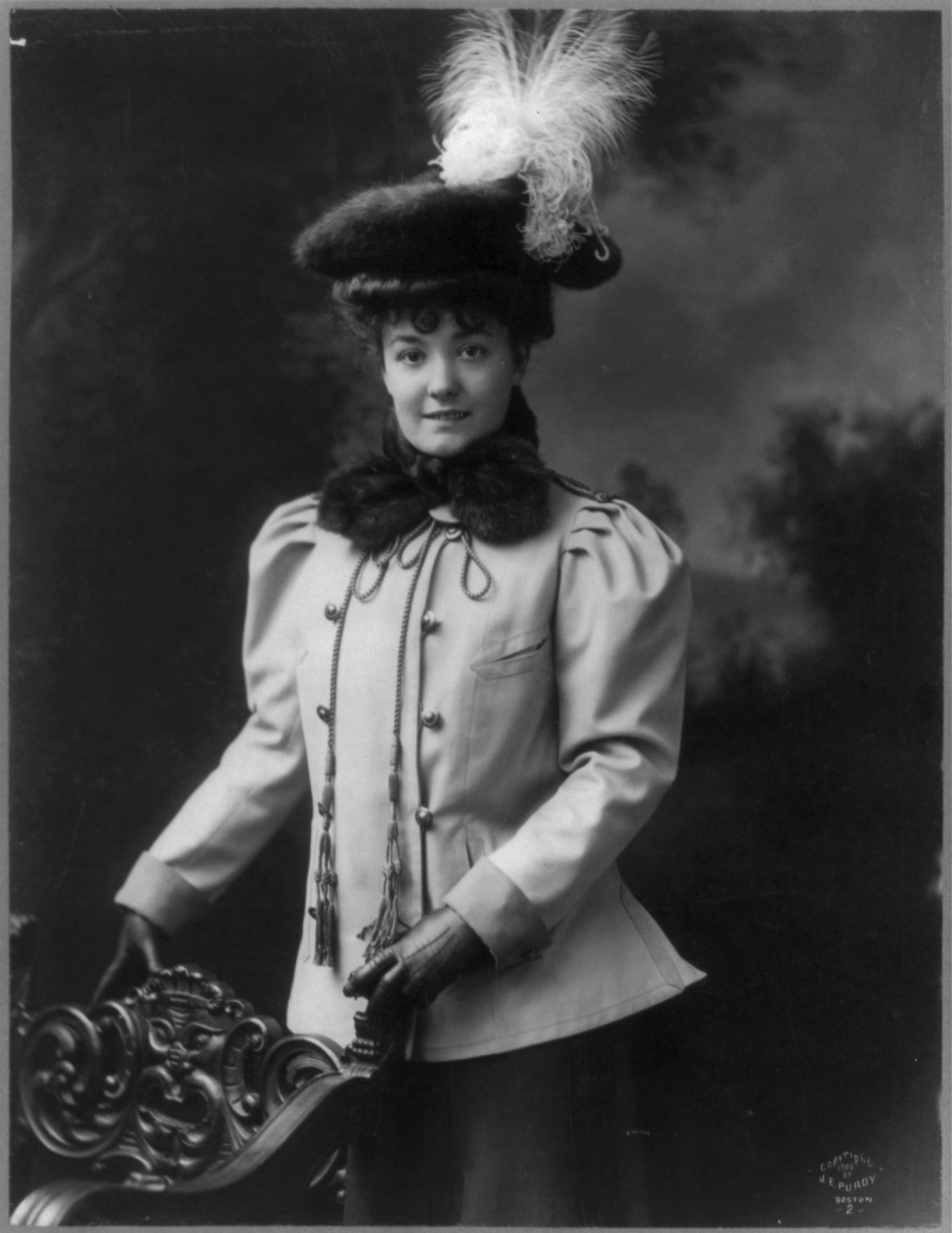
Hearst, photographed by James E. Purdy around 1905

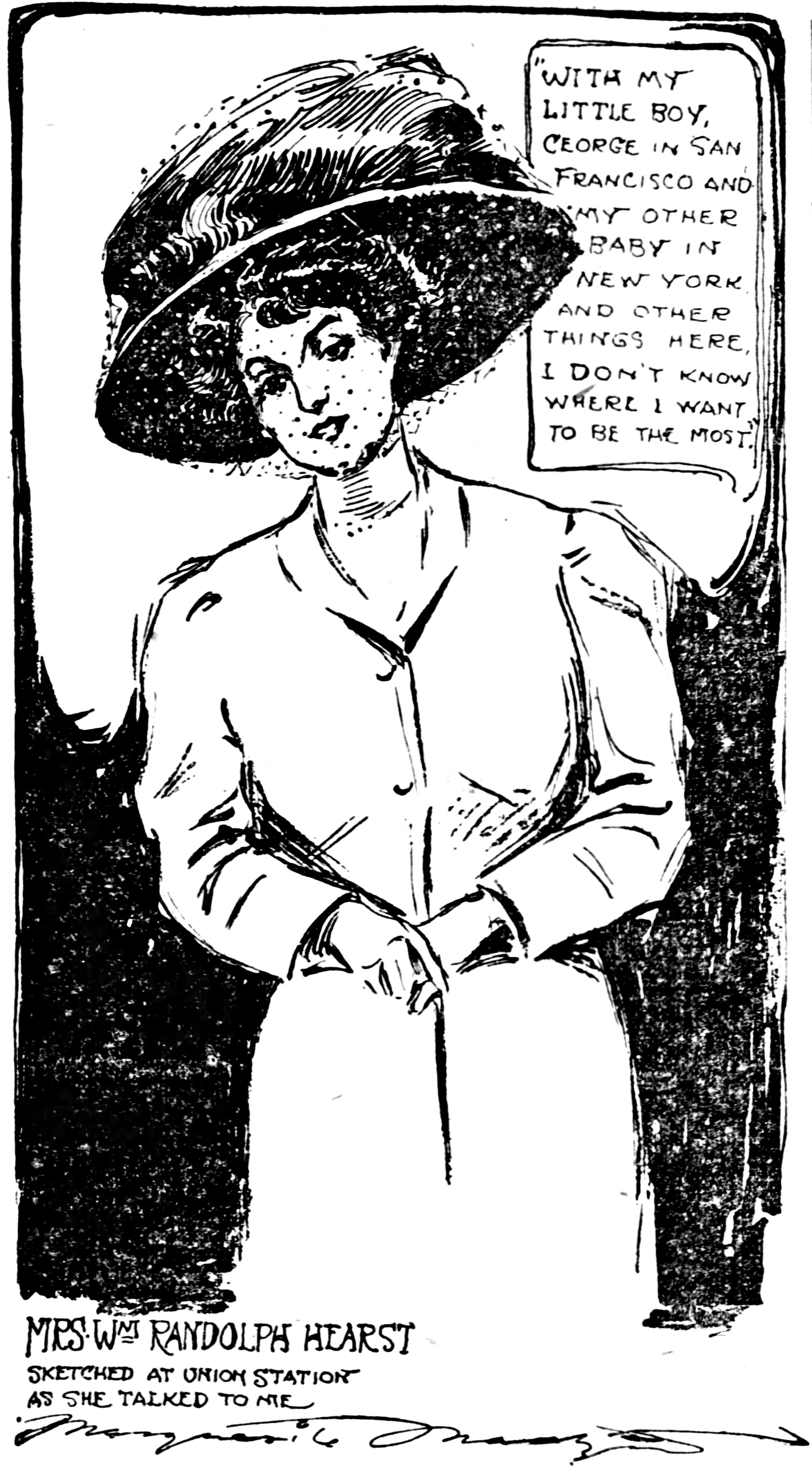
Hearst, sketched by Marguerite Martyn in 1908

Millicent Hearst gave birth to five sons: George Randolph Hearst, born on April 23, 1904; William Randolph Hearst Jr., born January 27, 1908; John Randolph Hearst, born September 26, 1909; and twins Randolph Apperson Hearst and David Whitmire (né Elbert Willson) Hearst, born December 2, 1915. W.R.'s mother, Phoebe Apperson Hearst, at first dismayed by Millicent’s humble origins, warmed to her daughter-in-law with the birth of her grandchildren.

Millicent was a member of the New York State Commission for the Panama–Pacific International Exposition held in San Francisco in 1915 and acted as chief official hostess at the New York Pavilion during the exposition.

New York City Mayor John Hylan appointed her chairman of the Mayor’s Committee of Women on National Defense during World War I. The committee sponsored entertainments for servicemen, operated a canteen, encouraged enlistments, sponsored patriotic rallies, and provided staples such as coal, milk, and ice to the needy. Hearst also served on wartime committees to raise funds for the rebuilding of France and the relief of French orphans.

In 1921, she founded the Free Milk Fund for Babies, which provided free milk to the poor of New York City for decades. She also hosted charitable fundraisers for a variety of causes, including crippled children, unemployed girls, the New York Women’s Trade League, the Democratic National Committee, the Evening Journal - New York Journal Christmas Fund, and the Village Welfare of Port Washington, New York. Eleanor Roosevelt joined Millicent Hearst at many of these charitable events during the Great Depression.

The Hearsts were married until W.R. Hearst's death in 1951. They never divorced, in part due to her Catholicism, but were estranged starting in 1926 when his liaison with Marion Davies became public. Millicent sought a divorce from W.R. Hearst in 1937, but the divorce fell through when she insisted on Cosmopolitan magazine as part of her property settlement, to which W.R. Hearst would not agree.

Millicent established a separate life and residence in New York City as a socialite and philanthropist, rarely visiting her husband at their estate in San Simeon, California, known as Hearst Castle. She remained close to her five sons throughout her life.

Millicent Willson Hearst died on December 5, 1974, more than two decades after the death of her husband, and was buried at the Woodlawn Cemetery in the Bronx.
