= Pierre-Yves Roussel =

French businessman

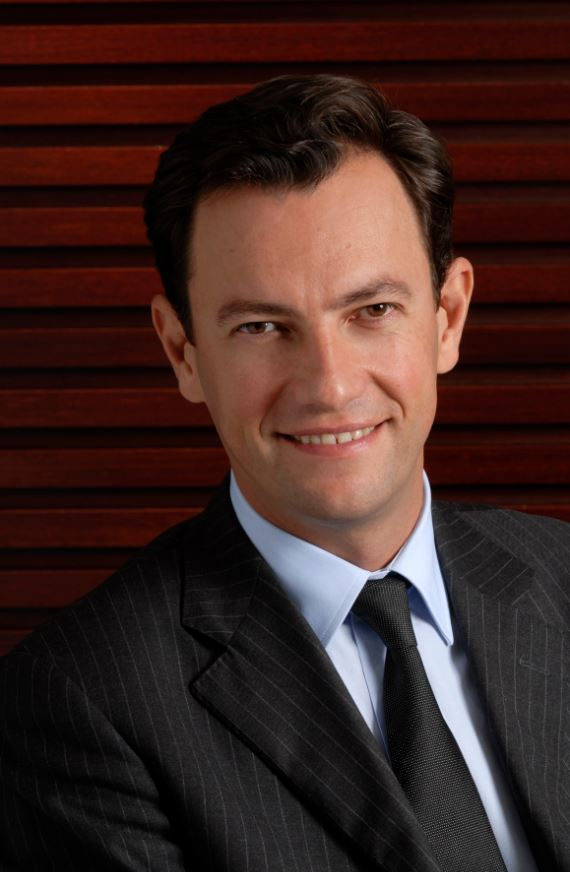
- Born: November 7, 1965 (age 61); Paris, France
- Other name: PYR
- Education: ESCP Europe; Université libre de Bruxelles; University of Pennsylvania
- Occupation: Business executive
- Years active: 1990–present
- Known for: CEO of Tory Burch LLC
- Spouse: Tory Burch (m. 2018)
- Children: 3

Pierre-Yves Roussel (born November 7, 1965) is a French-American business executive who is the CEO of Tory Burch LLC, a role he assumed in 2019. He was previously the chairman and CEO of LVMH Fashion Group from 2006 to 2017, before moving into an advisory role at the luxury conglomerate in 2018.

== Early life and education ==
Roussel was born in Paris, France. He graduated from ESCP Europe with a degree in Economics. He has a postgraduate degree from Brussels University (Solvay Business School), which he earned during the time he worked at Crédit Commercial de France in Brussels. Roussel has an MBA from Wharton Business School – University of Pennsylvania.

== Career ==
=== Early career ===
Roussel began his career as a financial analyst at Crédit Commercial de France, now known as HSBC France. After obtaining an MBA from Wharton, he joined the consulting firm McKinsey & Company, where he had increasing responsibilities (France, New York, Hong Kong, Japan) before being elected partner in 1998, and then senior partner in 2004.

=== LVMH ===
In 2004, Roussel joined the LVMH executive committee as executive vice president, strategy and operations. In 2006, he was named chairman and chief executive officer of LVMH Fashion Group, which includes Berluti, Céline, Donna Karan, DKNY, Givenchy, Kenzo, Loewe, Marc Jacobs, Pucci, Nicholas Kirkwood, Louis Vuitton, and J. W. Anderson.

He repositioned and developed several fashion houses within LVMH by appointing and collaborating with Artistic Directors: Riccardo Tisci at Givenchy, Phoebe Philo at Céline, Carol Lim and Humberto Leon at Kenzo, J. W. Anderson at Loewe and, in 2015, Dao Yi Chow and Maxwell Osborne at Donna Karan.

=== Tory Burch LLC ===
Roussel became CEO of Tory Burch LLC in January 2019. He leads the company in close partnership with Burch.

In 2021, he created a relationship between Tory Burch and the Parsons School of Design, including the establishment of a $1 million endowed scholarship fund.

By 2024 he had overseen Tory Burch LLC's global expansion, reinforced its leadership in core categories, achieved the launch of several bestselling product lines, increased brand desirability, and optimized the company's operations and infrastructure.

== Memberships ==
In addition to being on the board of directors of Tory Burch LLC, Roussel is also a member of the boards of directors of McLaren Group and Lectra. He is on the advisory board of the Wharton School's Baker Retailing Center.

He is a former board member of the Fédération de la Haute Couture et de la Mode.

He has been a member of The Business of Fashion's BoF 500 since its launch in 2013.

Roussel has previously served as a jury member for the LVMH Prize for Young Fashion Designers, the ANDAM Fashion Award, and the CFDA Fashion Incubator.

== Personal life ==
Roussel has three children from his first marriage.

In January 2016, Roussel was engaged to fashion designer Tory Burch, whom he had been dating since June 2014, and they married in 2018.
