= Rowing Blazers =

American clothing company

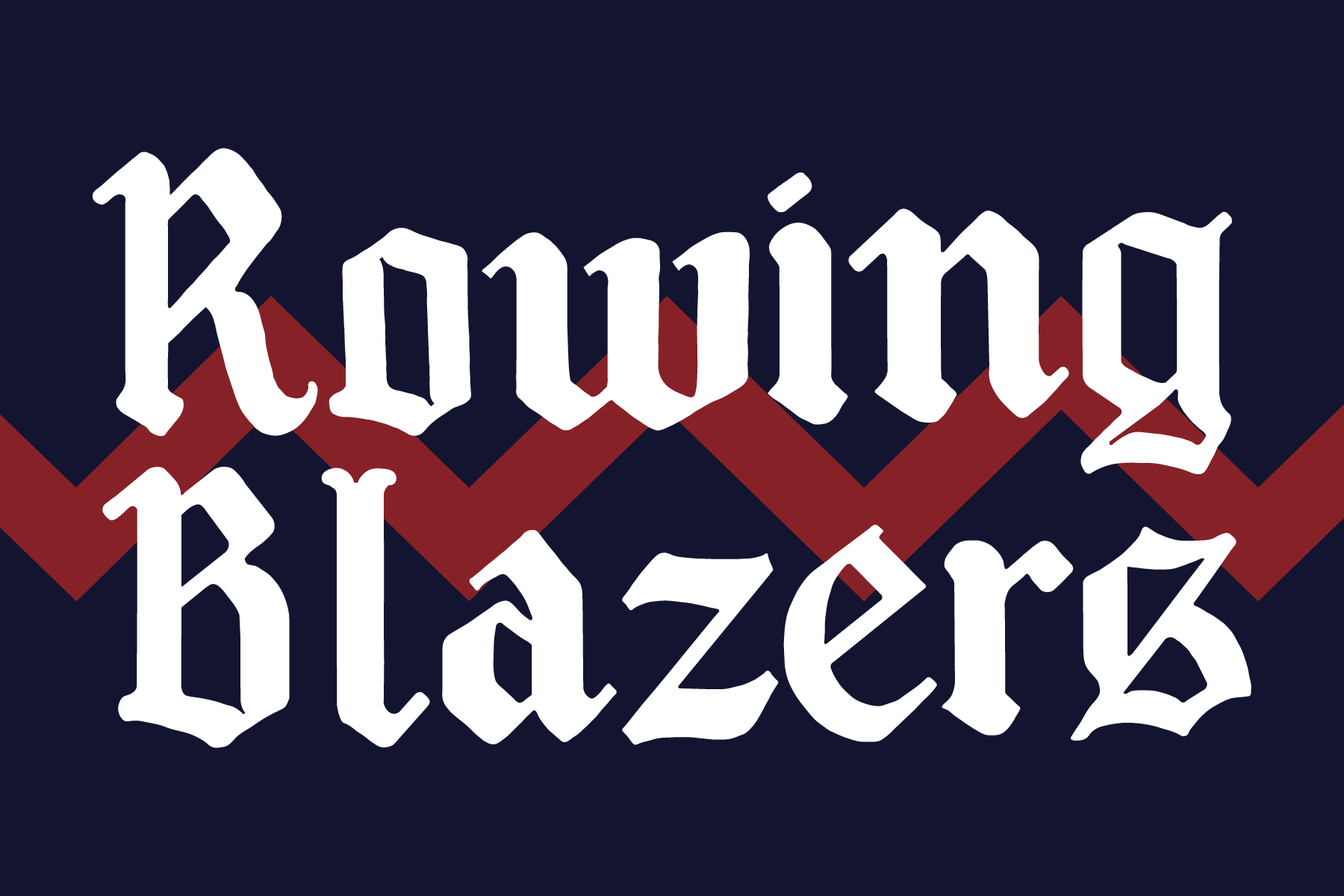
- Type: Private
- Industry: Apparel
- Founded: 2017
- Founder: Jack Carlson
- Headquarters: New York City, United States
- Products: Luxury apparel and accessories
- Website: rowingblazers.com

Rowing Blazers is an American clothing and accessories brand founded by Jack Carlson. The brand is known for its blazers, rugby shirts, and other apparel, as well as its colorful, slightly subversive take on "preppy" style, its celebrity clientele, and high-profile collaborations.

In 2024, Rowing Blazers was acquired by Tory Burch co-founder Christopher Burch's investment firm Burch Creative Capital.

== Overview ==
Rowing Blazers was established in New York City in 2017, producing collections in Manhattan's Garment District and in Europe. The brand takes its name from Carlson's book about the blazer tradition at rowing clubs around the world and the stories, myths, and rituals around them. Aside from its ready-to-wear collections, the brand makes blazers for rowing clubs and collegiate rowing teams around the world, as well as for other clubs and organizations, including The Explorers Club.

The brand is known for combining elements from the worlds of tailoring, sportswear, and streetwear, and for its celebrity clientele, including Timothée Chalamet, Pete Davidson, Gwyneth Paltrow, Russell Westbrook, Justin and Hailey Bieber, BTS, and Mindy Kaling.

Rowing Blazers has been featured in Vogue, Esquire, The New York Times, and other publications. GQ called Rowing Blazers "the brand that's saving prep by kicking down its walls," and The London Times referred to it as a "cult streetwear brand, worn by Timothée Chalamet, inspired by a young, sporting Prince Charles."

== Collaborations ==
Rowing Blazers has produced collaborations with an eclectic range of brands, including watches with Seiko, Zodiac, Tudor, and TAG Heuer; footwear with Sperry, Hunter Boots, and K-Swiss; and apparel collections with the NBA, Barbour, J. Press, J.Crew, Umbro, FILA, Babar the Elephant, SEGA, Thomas the Tank Engine (for the 80th Anniversary of the Railway Series books), The Grateful Dead and Harry's Bar in Paris.

The brand has also partnered with artist and designer Luke Edward Hall, the estate of photographer Slim Aarons, and the U.S. national rowing and rugby teams.

The brand launched its first women's collection by partnering with Joanna Osborne and Sally Muir, founders of Warm & Wonderful and designers of the "black sheep" sweater worn by Princess Diana. Together they released the original sheep sweater for the first time in thirty years.

In 2023, Rowing Blazers launched major collaborations with Gucci and Target designed by Jack Carlson's team. The pieces in the Rowing Blazers Gucci collection capsule ranged from a formal white tie tailcoat to a pair of mesh gym shorts, as well as the brand's signature rowing blazers and rugby shirts. The Rowing Blazers Target collection, a one-time limited-edition collaboration, spanned men's, women's, and children's clothing, pet accessories, games, and home furnishings. The apparel included extended sizing and adaptive styles. The collection debuted at New York Fashion Week, and was available in over a thousand Target locations across the United States, with many styles selling out within the first several hours.
