= Felipe Oliveira Baptista =

Portuguese fashion designer

Felipe Oliveira Baptista (born 1975) is a Portuguese fashion designer. He lives and works in Paris.

== Early life and education ==
Oliveira Baptista was born in 1975 on the Portuguese Atlantic archipelago of the Azores. He graduated from Kingston University in London, where he studied fashion design.

== Career ==
Upon graduation, Oliveira Baptista worked for Max Mara, Christophe Lemaire and Cerruti. In 2002 he won the Grand Prix of the Hyères International Festival and in 2003 he won the ANDAM / LVMH Fashion Award.

In 2003 Oliveira Baptista founded his own label Felipe Oliveira Baptista with his partner Séverine Oliveira Baptista. He has since been living and working in Paris. In 2005, he was invited to show in the official calendar of Couture for the first time and won the ANDAM / LVMH Fashion Award. In 2009 he had his first show during ready-to-wear Paris Fashion Week.

In addition to working on his own label, Oliveira Baptista was asked by Uniqlo to collaborate to the making of a 2006 capsule collection. In 2008 Nike commissioned him a book and a project called "AW77". The same year he also exhibited an installation work at the Hyères International Festival.

From 2010 until 2018, Oliveira Baptista worked as creative director of Lacoste. In 2014 he stopped his own ready-to-wear line to dedicate more time to Lacoste and projects in other creative fields. Under his tenure at Lacoste, revenues grew from around 1 billion euros in 2009 to more than 2 billion euros in 2016. He also brought in multiple collaborators to reinterpret the brand's history, including Supreme, Maison Lesage and Jean-Paul Goude. In 2018 Oliveira Baptista and Lacoste ended their collaboration.

In July 2019, Oliveira Baptista succeeded Carol Lim and Humberto Leon and joined Kenzo, a brand of LVMH, as creative director. He showed his debut collection for the brand in 2020. In April 2021, Kenzo said it would part ways with Oliveira Baptista by the end of his term in June.

== Exhibitions ==
In 2007 Oliveira Baptista was invited to exhibit some of his work at the MUDAM in Luxembourg. In 2013 a retrospective of ten years of his creation was exhibited at the MUDE in Lisbon. He later dressed Marie, a 2017 sculpture by Portuguese artist Julião Sarmento in the exterior courtyard of the Calouste Gulbenkian Foundation in Paris. In 2017 his photography book Lisboa was published as part of the collection "Portraits de Villes".
