= C. Wonder =

Defunct American fashion retailer

- Type: Privately held company
- Industry: Retail
- Founded: 2011
- Defunct: 2015
- Fate: Bankrupt
- Headquarters: New York City, United States
- Key people: J. Christopher Burch
- Products: Women's clothing, accessories, and home decor items
- Website: www.cwonder.com

C. Wonder was an American fashion retailer founded by J. Christopher Burch the ex-husband of Tory Burch. The company sold a similar style of merchandise to Tory Burch at lower prices. This would lead to legal disputes between the two companies.

C. Wonder sold women's clothing, accessories home decor items,pillows, table ware, art books, picnic baskets, as well as electronics and other products, leading The New Yorker to label the company as "the World's Fair of retail".

C. Wonder was founded in 2011 and operated until it filed for bankruptcy and closed all its stores in January 2015. Xcel Brands acquired the retailer’s property rights, trademarks and other assets and continues to sell products under the brand online and at retail locations in the United States such as Walmart and Nordstrom.

== History ==
C. Wonder was founded by Tory Burch ex-husband and venture capitalist J. Christopher Burch in 2010. In July 2011, the first C. Wonder signs were posted on the exterior of a storefront on Spring Street in New York City, with a website posted describing the plans for C. Wonder's concept and line.

On October 22, 2011 C. Wonder launched its 7,200 square foot location in Manhattan, featuring fitting rooms with public touch screens adjusting the lighting or changing the music. C. Wonder also introduced store wide check-out capabilities for its sales associates via mobile points of sale (mPOS), allowing sales associates to check-out customers via iPod touches anywhere in the store.

Architectural Digest called the store "the next generation of shopping", writing that the company would soon launch their website. The first store was designed in an empty factory an hour outside of Shanghai, China, and then shipped to New York for the grand opening. This was the first US retail store to ever be entirely produced and manufactured in China. In September 2012 C. Wonder launched its second flagship store in Time Warner Center. The space moved into part of the building previously occupied by Borders and covered more than 8,000 square feet.

Burch had stated that C. Wonder stores were designed on the principle of disrupting the traditional retail environment. According to The New York Times, C. Wonder's retail strategy was to open up seasonal pop up stores in places like Southampton in New York State and Nantucket in Massachusetts, in addition to their permanent stores. The first California location of C. Wonder opened in August 2012 at the Fashion Island Mall located in Newport Beach. In 2012, C. Wonder opened eight new stores in total.

C. Wonder stores had been hosting charity events for local non-profits. In February 2012, a C. Wonder store in Paramus, New Jersey hosted a private shopping even where 10% of sales went to the Gilda's Club Northern New Jersey cancer support organization.

In November 2013, C. Wonder signed a "licensing agreement with Al Tayer to open stores in the Middle East, such as the Mall of the Emirates, in Dubai, in early Spring 2014. Vince Montemarano, senior vice president of international at C. Wonder, said stores in "the Middle East, Latin America and Asia will be franchised".

As of 2013, C. Wonder operated 30 stores in the US.

On November 21, 2014, it was revealed that C. Wonder would significantly reduce their domestic retail operations. C. Wonder made no official announcement, but a report surfaced a day later detailing the locations that would likely close.

In January 2015, the company filed for bankruptcy.

A few months later the Brand and its assets were sold to Xcel Brands that continued to use it for products sold online and through traditional retail stores.

== Controversies ==
The founder of C. Wonder, Chris Burch, was involved in a lawsuit with his ex-wife, Tory Burch, regarding similarities between the C. Wonder and Tory Burch brands. At the time of the lawsuit, J. Christopher Burch was still Chairman of the Board for Tory Burch. In October 2012, J. Christopher Burch launched a lawsuit against Tory Burch, accusing them of blocking his attempts to sell part of his shares in Tory Burch and claiming that C. Wonder's price point is much lower than Tory Burch products, preventing him from competing with the brand. The lawsuit, as well as all pending legal claims between the C. Wonder founder and his ex-wife, was settled on December 31, 2012.

== People ==
Andrea Hyde was the president of C. Wonder until March 2014. Before Hyde, Amy Shecter was the company's president.

J. Christopher Burch began his career in the fashion world in 1976, when he launched Eagle Eye—a company that eventually established retails stores across the US. Burch also co-founded the Tory Burch fashion house, as well as ventures like Jawbone and Powermat Technologies.

== Recognition ==
Accessories Council Excellence Award for Speciality Retailer of the Year, 2012.
