= John Augustine Hearst =

American executive and philanthropist (born 1952)

Austin Hearst
- Born: John Augustine Chilton Hearst; October 24, 1952 (age 73)
- Occupations: media business executive; film producer; philanthropist
- Spouse: Gabriela Perezutti Souza (m. 2013)
- Children: 3
- Father: William Randolph Hearst Jr.
- Family: Hearst family

John Augustine Chilton Hearst (born October 24, 1952), also known as Austin Hearst, is an American business and media executive, film producer and philanthropist. He plays a leadership role in the family-owned Hearst Corporation, one of America's largest diversified media companies where he has been a member of the board of directors since 1990. Hearst is also vice president of special projects for Hearst Entertainment & Syndication, the operating group responsible for the Hearst Entertainment interests in cable television networks, including ESPN, Lifetime, A&E and HISTORY.

== Career ==
Hearst is the founder, chairman, and chief executive officer of Chestnut Holdings LLC, a private equity and agricultural development company. He partnered with architect Philippe Stark and hotelier Alan Faena to develop the Faena Hotel+Universe in Buenos Aires. The investment in the building, erected in 1902 as a grain storage facility, was in excess of $100 million. With Christopher Burch, he completed a $19 million luxury home project in Nantucket, Massachusetts.

In fashion, Hearst was one of the first investors in Tory Burch. Other investments in the sector included Candela, Fashion Tech Forum, Jack Rogers, Soludos, and Bikyni. In 2015, he launched with his wife designer Gabriela Perezutti Hearst, Gabriela Hearst. In consumer products, he has been an initial investor in Jawbone and Tipa Bags among others. As a principal and founder of Bridge Builders Collaborative, he's made investments in the mind fitness sectors included Headspace, eMindful, Happify, Pear Therapeutics, and Interaxon.

== Philanthropy ==
Hearst is actively involved in a wide range of civic, philanthropic and global humanitarian causes, including early childhood development projects with Save the Children and the government of Bhutan, and community agricultural projects in South Sudan. He is on the board of directors of Save the Children USA, an organization he has been closely involved with for more than 20 years. He was awarded The National Humanitarian 2014 Award. Hearst also serves on the board of advisors of the Blue School, and Karuna-Shechen, a non-profit humanitarian organization focused on providing education, healthcare and social services in the greater Himalayan region.

== Personal life ==
Hearst's father was William Randolph Hearst Jr., chairman of the Hearst Corporation in New York; his mother was Austine McDonnell, a columnist for The Washington Times-Herald. Hearst is a grandson of the late William Randolph Hearst, the editor and publisher. He has three children and is married to fashion designer and Uruguayan rancher Gabriela Hearst. His previous marriage to Christine Mularchuk, the current wife of Stephen Schwarzman, ended in divorce.
