= Jack Carlson =

Jack Carlson may refer to:

- Jack Carlson (ice hockey) (born 1954), retired American ice hockey forward
- Jack Carlson (rowing) (born 1987), American designer and rowing coxswain

== See also ==
- Jack Karlson (1942–2024), Australian subject of a viral video
