= Jack Carlson (rowing) =

American rowing coxswain and designer (born 1987)

Jack Carlson FRSA, FRNS, FRAS
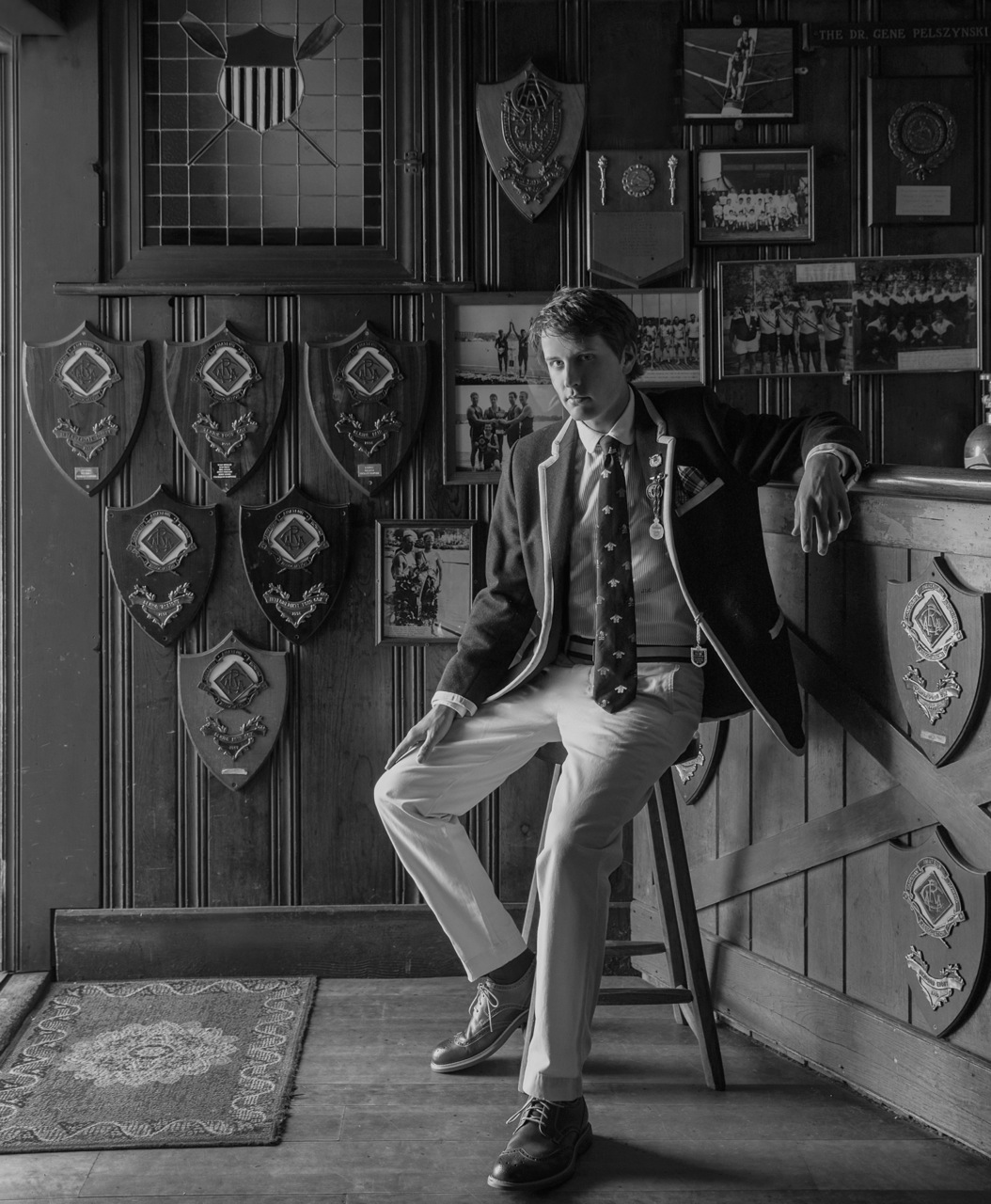
- Carlson at the Boat House

Personal information
- Website: https://www.jackcarlson.com/jack
- Born: May 22, 1987 (age 39)
- Education: Georgetown University (BSFS); Brasenose College, Oxford (MPhil, DPhil)
- Occupations: Designer; Archaeologist; Author; Rower; Entrepreneur
- Labels: Rowing Blazers; Warm & Wonderful; Gyles & George; Arthur Ashe
- Title: Creative Director

Sport
- Country: United States
- Sport: Rowing
- College team: Oxford University Boat Club; Georgetown Hoyas
- Club: Oxford Brookes; New York Athletic Club
Medal record
Men's rowing
Representing the United States
World Championships
Bronze medal – third place	2015 Aiguebelette	LM8+

Jack Carlson (born May 22, 1987) is an American designer, author, archeologist, and former U.S. national team rowing coxswain. He is the founder of the New York-based apparel brand Rowing Blazers, and has led the revival of several British and American heritage brands, including Warm & Wonderful, Gyles & George, and Arthur Ashe. In 2024, he sold his company to Tory Burch co-founder Christopher Burch's firm, Burch Creative Capital.

Carlson represented the United States at three World Championships, and won a bronze medal at the 2015 World Rowing Championships in Aiguebelette, France. An archaeologist by training, he is the author of several books and articles. Carlson is presently the president and chief creative officer of the heritage Ivy brand J. Press.

== Early life and education ==
Carlson grew up in Boston, Massachusetts, and Hampstead, England. He graduated from Georgetown University's School of Foreign Service, where he studied Chinese and Classics. At Georgetown, he was captain of the rowing team. Upon graduating, he was awarded an Allbritton Scholarship for graduate study at Brasenose College, Oxford.

At Oxford, he used his background in Chinese and Classics to study Ancient Rome and early Imperial China in a comparative context. After completing a master's degree, he was awarded a Clarendon Scholarship for doctoral studies, and his dissertation, supervised by Dame Jessica Rawson and R.R.R. Smith, is a comparative work on symbols, images, and imperial power in the Roman Empire and contemporaneous Qin-Han China. At Oxford, he was a member of both the Oxford University Lightweight Rowing Club and its heavyweight counterpart, Oxford University Boat Club.

== Writing and archaeology ==
Carlson worked as a field archaeologist in Italy at the Etruscan site Poggio Colla, in the Mugello Valley. He is the author of a wide range of academic articles, and his work has appeared in Antiquity, the New England Classical Journal, and Foreign Policy.

He is the author and illustrator of the books A Humorous Guide to Heraldry and Rowing Blazers, an illustrated book about the jackets traditionally worn by rowers on such occasions as Henley Royal Regatta and their history and traditions.

Carlson is a Fellow of the Royal Society of Arts, the Royal Numismatic Society, the Royal Asiatic Society, and The Explorers Club, and a life member of the Archaeological Institute of America.

== Design and fashion ==
Ralph Lauren discovered Carlson through a pre-publication copy of his book Rowing Blazers and hosted a series of launch events and parties for the project. This served as Carlson's entrée into the fashion community, and inspired him to start his own brand and design studio, which he also named Rowing Blazers.

He began by designing blazers for rowing clubs and other teams and organizations, but the brand quickly expanded beyond blazers and beyond the world of rowing. Today, the brand is known for its celebrity clientele, including Timothée Chalamet, Pete Davidson, Gwyneth Paltrow, Russell Westbrook, Justin and Hailey Bieber, BTS, and Mindy Kaling.

Carlson is known for combining elements from the worlds of tailoring, sportswear, and streetwear in unusual ways, and the brand has been featured in Vogue, Esquire, The New York Times, and other publications. GQ described it as "the brand that's saving prep by kicking down its walls," and Men's Journal as "classic British and Ivy League iconography with a post-modern, punk twist."

Carlson has been tapped for frequent and eclectic design collaborations, most notably his watch designs for Tudor, Seiko, TAG Heuer, and Zodiac. He has also designed footwear collections in partnership with Sperry Top-Sider, Hunter, and K-Swiss, and capsules with J. Crew, the NBA, Barbour, Umbro, and Fila. In 2022, American handbag brand LeSportsac tapped Carlson to create its premium Arc En Ciel line.

Carlson collaborated with Gucci in 2023, designing a colorful Oxbridge-inspired collection that ranged from a formal white tie tailcoat to a pair of mesh gym shorts. The campaign was shot at Lake Como.

Carlson also designed a collection for Target in 2023. The collection, released under the motto "A Club for Everyone", spanned men's, women's, and children's clothing, pet accessories, games, and home furnishings. The apparel included extended sizing and adaptive styles. The collection debuted at New York Fashion Week, and launched in over a thousand Target locations across the United States, with many styles selling out within the first several hours.

Carlson has also led the revival of several heritage apparel and accessories brands, including two British knitwear brands famously favored by Diana, Princess of Wales, Warm & Wonderful and Gyles & George; and American tennis and lifestyle brand Arthur Ashe.

In 2024, Carlson sold a majority stake in Rowing Blazers to Tory Burch LLC co-founder Christopher Burch's investment firm, Burch Creative Capital.

== Rowing ==
Carlson represented the United States in rowing as a coxswain for the U.S. team at the 2011, 2014, and 2015 World Championships. His highest finish came in 2015 with a bronze medal in the lightweight men's eight.

He won both the Head of the Charles and Henley Royal Regatta in 2013. At Henley, his crew won the Britannia Challenge Cup, equalling the record time to the Barrier, which had stood since 1993.

At Oxford, Carlson raced in the winning Lightweight Blue Boat at the 2011 Henley Boat Races and the losing Isis crew at the 2010 Oxford-Cambridge Boat Race, before switching allegiances to Oxford Brookes University Boat Club, where he coxed from 2011 to 2014. Carlson also served as head coach of Oriel College Boat Club in 2011–2012 and 2013–2014, winning the Summer Eights Headship in both seasons. Prior to Oxford, Carlson rowed and coxed at Georgetown, where he served as team captain in 2009, and Buckingham Browne & Nichols School in Cambridge, Massachusetts, where his rowing career began on the Charles River.

== Other activities ==
In 2023, Carlson trekked to the South Pole with his seventy-two-year-old father.
