= Luke Edward Hall =

British interior designer

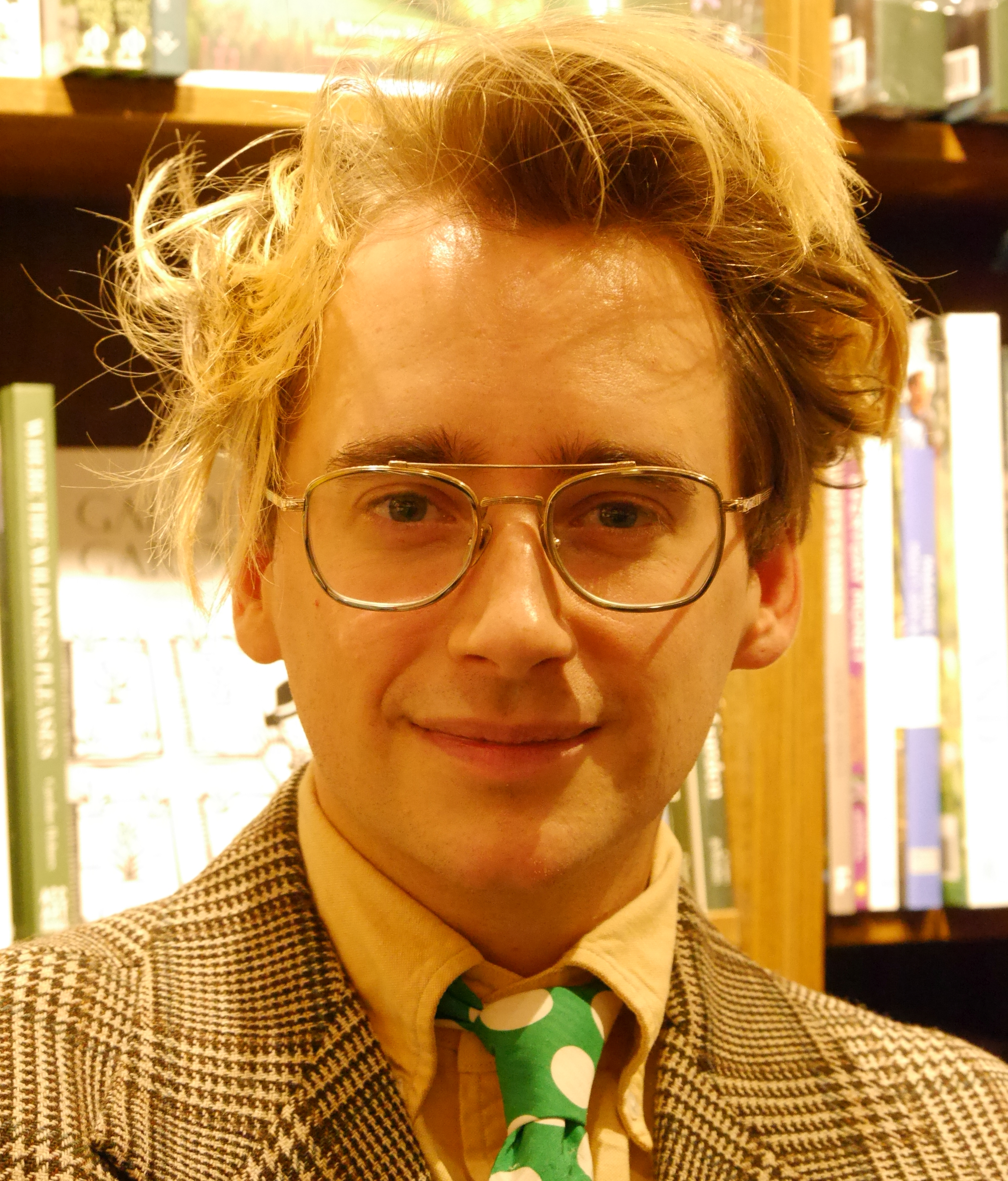
- Hall at Hatchards, London in 2022
- Education: Central Saint Martins
- Years active: 2013–present
- Spouse: Duncan Campbell (m. 2022)
- Website: www.lukeedwardhall.com

Luke Edward Hall is a British artist, designer, author, and columnist, described by both The Times and The Guardian as a "rising design star".

== Early life ==
Hall grew up in Hampshire. He studied at Central Saint Martins.

== Career ==
Hall worked for Ben Pentreath before establishing his own studio in 2015.

He has collaborated with Burberry, Liberty, the Victoria and Albert Museum, Gant, Richard-Ginori, Diptyque, Rowing Blazers, and the Royal Academy of Arts. He re-designed the Hôtel Les Deux Gares in Paris, and launched his first solo apparel collection called Chateau Orlando in 2022.

His work has been featured in Vogue, Esquire, The New York Times, and many other publications. He writes a regular design and style column for the Financial Times.

== Personal life ==
In 2022, Hall married fellow designer Duncan Campbell of Campbell-Rey atelier at their Gloucestershire farmhouse.
