= J. Press =

American fashion brand and retailer

- Type: Private
- Industry: Clothier
- Founded: New Haven, Connecticut, U.S. (1902)
- Headquarters: New York City, U.S.
- Key people: Jacobi Press (Founder); Jun Murakami (Current CEO); Jack Carlson (Current CCO); Irving Press (Past CEO); Paul Press (Past CFO)
- Products: Men's Clothing
- Parent: Onward Kashiyama (Onward Holdings, Ltd.)
- Website: jpress.com

J. Press is a traditional Ivy style men's clothier founded in 1902 on Yale University's campus in New Haven, Connecticut, by Jacobi Press. The brand also has stores in New York City and Washington, D.C.

J. Press became the first American brand to be licensed in Japan in 1974. In 1986, J. Press was acquired by the Japanese apparel company Onward Kashiyama, which had previously been its licensee for 14 years. J. Press is currently part of the Onward Group (Onward Holdings, Ltd.). In 2025, Jack Carlson was named as creative director.

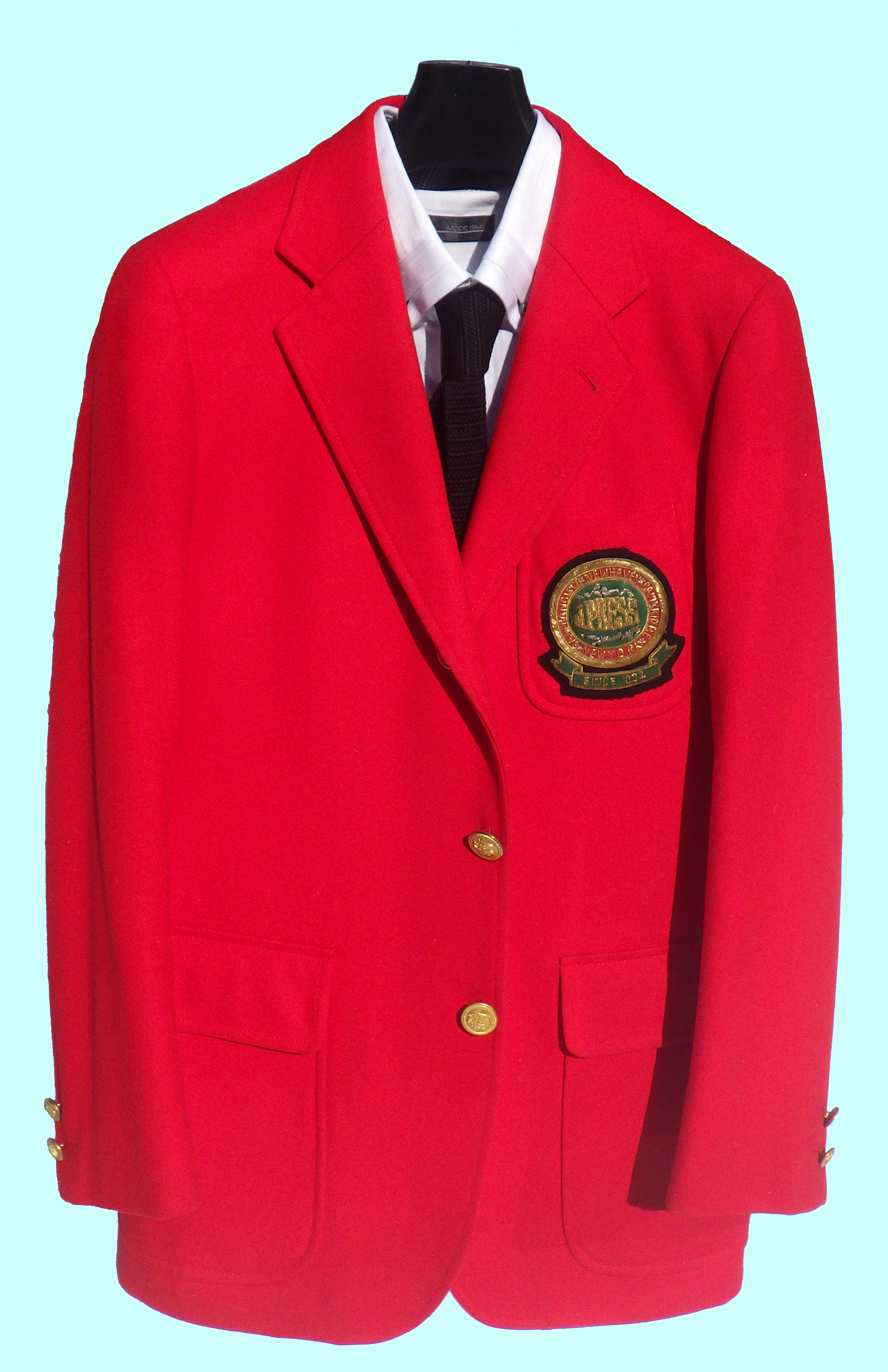
A patch logo blazer from J. Press

== History ==
Founder Jacobi Press in New Haven, Connecticut

J. Press's New Haven, Connecticut store

Jacobi Press immigrated to the US from Latvia in 1896 with the intention of becoming a rabbi; however, he began working for his uncle's custom tailoring business in Middleton, CT upon his arrival to the United States. He founded J.Press six years later.

By the 1920s, J. Press had become the preferred tailor for clientele, such as Duke Ellington, Cary Grant and Robert Frost. In a 1936 letter written to his daughter, F. Scott Fitzgerald warned her to "beware the wolves in J. Pressed tweed."

Irving E. Press, son of Jacobi, was CEO of J. Press during its heyday and pioneered key innovations such as the Shaggy Dog sweater. In 1974, the Press family sold the rights to license J. Press for the Japanese market, making it the first American brand to be licensed in Japan. In 1986, Kashiyama acquired J. Press and the company ceased to be run by the Press family.

Japanese licensed distribution is roughly six times larger than the American-made J. Press. J. Press is currently part of the Onward Group (Onward Holdings, Ltd.). More recently, notable patrons have included Supreme Court Justice Stephen Breyer and Governor Bill Richardson as regular customers.

Over its history, J. Press has done a variety of collaborations with other clothing brands, artists, and designers. Past collaborations include those with Urban Outfitters, Opening Ceremony, and Todd Snyder.

== Style ==
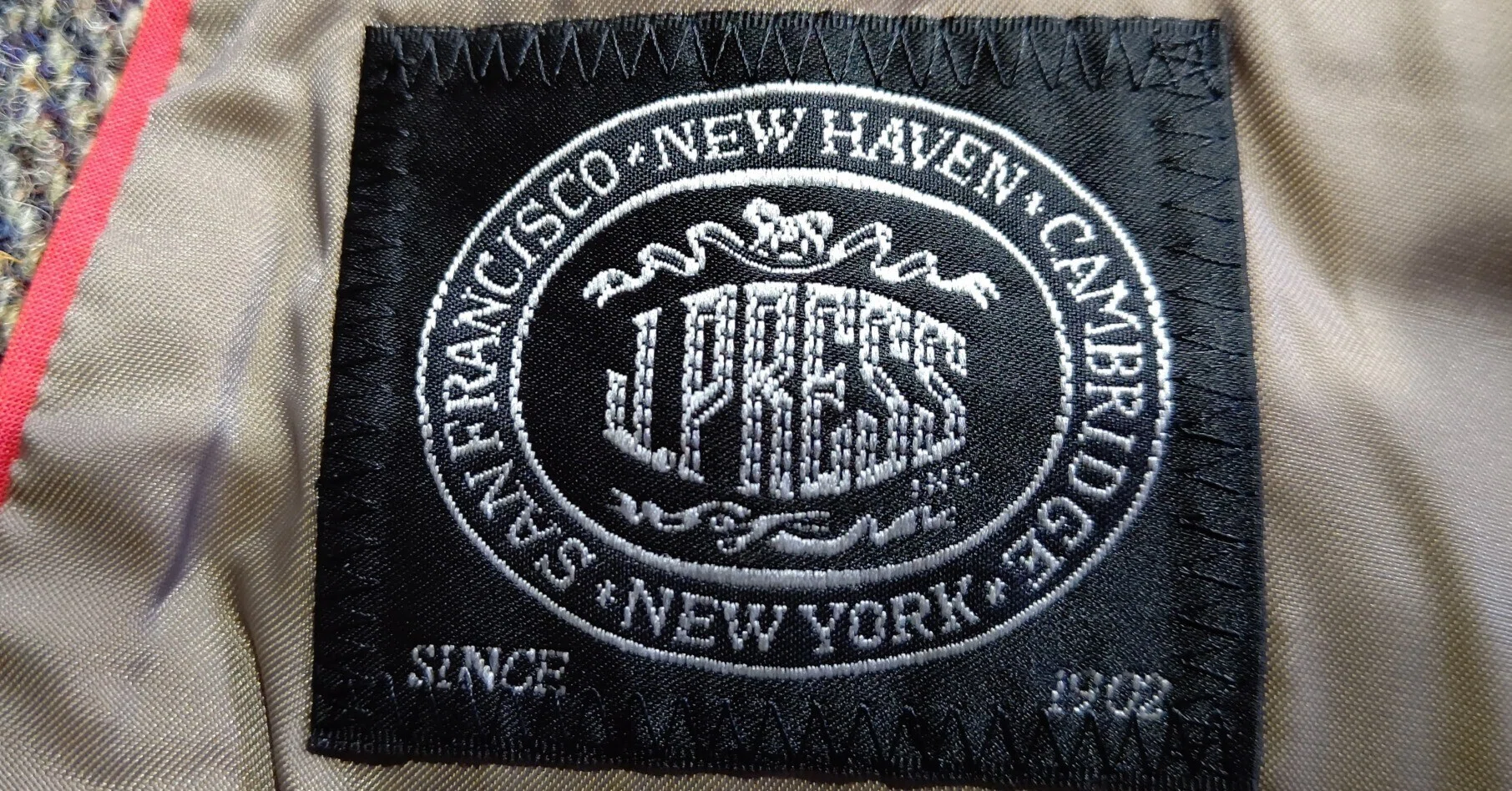
J. Press clothing tag (circa 1968 - 1980)

Since its founding, J. Press' clothing has remained much the same. J. Press is said to carry on a traditional Ivy League style of men's clothing, showing a commitment to classic style. J. Press caters most to an old-fashioned preppy subculture that eschews popular culture trends. Its signature branded items include: the "Shaggy Dog" Shetland sweaters, Indian madras jackets, and Oxford button down shirts. The company produces the vast majority of its off-the-rack jackets in the traditional "three-button sack" style rarely found today in America, and for the most part, only produces plain-front trousers, for which the company suggests a traditional 1 3/4" cuff. Fabrics are generally subdued, except for traditionally bright-colored items such as casual trousers and sweaters. Its neckties bear traditional repp stripe, foulard, and paisley motifs. They also carry scarves and ties featuring motifs and colors for Ivy League schools, including Yale's Skull and Bones Society. J. Press dress overcoats are of lambswool, cashmere, or camel hair, or of herringbone tweed with a velvet collar in the Chesterfield style.

== Locations ==
The New Haven store was originally built in 1863 in the French Second Empire style as a residence for Cornelius Pierpont, a prominent local grocer. It was irreparably damaged by Winter Storm Nemo in February 2013; the company temporarily rented a store at 260 College St., across from the Shubert Theatre.

In 1912, the company opened a store in New York City "appropriately equidistant from the Yale and Harvard Clubs."

In May 2007, J. Press moved to 380 Madison Avenue in New York City, which closed indefinitely in 2014.

On March 1, 2013, J. Press opened a second store in New York City, located at 304 Bleecker Street, which carried a sub-label of the brand called "J. Press York Street", that was described by the New York Times as "a faint outline of the original." Designed by Shimon and Ariel Ovadia of the clothing brand Ovadia & Sons, York Street was geared towards a younger audience, embracing slimmer fitting clothing with bold colors and patterns. After four seasons, Shimon and Ariel Ovadia left York Street and it was merged into mainline J. Press and renamed "J. Press Blue".

Later in 2013, J. Press's New Haven store on York Street was severely damaged by a storm, and the company began constructing a new storefront while operating out of a temporary location. In 2022, on their 120th Anniversary, J. Press completed their flagship storefront at their historic location on Elm Street. The building adjoins their previous store and also houses J. Press's e-commerce distribution center.

In October 2017, J. Press closed the York Street store and opened a new store in midtown Manhattan, in the same building as the Yale Club. The store was expected to generate 25% of U.S. sales.

In April 2023, J. Press opened a second store in New York City, located at 501 Madison Avenue, which carried a sub-label of the brand called "J. Press Pennant Label." Pennant Label was geared toward a younger, college-aged audience. The clothes had trimmer cuts and were often marked by more youthful designs. Compared with mainline J. Press shirts and sweaters, Pennant Label's were cut to fit slimmer and be shorter in length, reminiscent of the designs from the York Street sub-label. By early 2025 the Madison Avenue store had closed. J. Press continues to sell Pennant Label garments via its website and other stores.

J. Press formerly had branches in Cambridge, Massachusetts (closed in August 2018 after 86 years), San Francisco, California and Princeton, New Jersey. Jack Carlson has spoken of J Press reopening a location near Harvard as a pet project. J. Press has three stores in the United States: New Haven, New York City, and Washington DC.

In September 2026, J. Press relocated its New York City location from the Yale Club to a standalone store at 340 Madison Avenue, on the corner of 44th and Madison, near where the first J. Press flagship in the city once stood.

== See also ==
- Brooks Brothers
- Ivy League (clothes)
- Paul Stuart
