= Warm & Wonderful =

British clothing company

- Company type: Privately held company
- Industry: Apparel
- Founded: 1979
- Founder: Joanna Osborne, Sally Muir
- Headquarters: London, England
- Key people: Jack Carlson (Creative Director)
- Products: Luxury apparel and accessories
- Website: warmandwonderful.com

Warm & Wonderful Knitwear is a British fashion brand specialising in knitwear. Founded by Joanna Osborne and Sally Muir in 1979, the label is best known for its "black sheep" sweater, famously worn by Diana, Princess of Wales. In 2023, a Warm & Wonderful jumper worn by Diana became the most valuable sweater in history.

== History ==
=== Early history ===
Osborne and Muir began selling their jumpers from a market stall in London's Covent Garden in 1979. Osborne and Muir are both professional artists (Osborne a sculptor, and Muir a painter), and both have had work featured in the Royal Academy Summer Exhibition. They have also published a series of knitting books for adults and children.

The brand's earliest designs included a jumper knitted to look like a brick wall, which customers could personalize with knitted "graffiti," and a grass-green jumper covered in knitted rows of white sheep and one black sheep.

The "black-sheep sweater" (as it came to be known), which Osborne and Muir subsequently introduced in other colours, proved to be a favourite among London's Sloane Ranger set, as well as artists, entertainers, and even royalty: David Bowie, Andy Warhol, Shelley Duvall, Penelope Keith, Anthony Andrews, and Princess Diana.

About the black-sheep sweater, Osborne and Muir have stated:

As artists, we've always identified with black sheep ourselves: because of a recessive gene, black sheep are born with black wool in flocks of otherwise white sheep (in a flock of a hundred, there might only be one black sheep!). We never imagined that our sheep jumpers would bring so many people so much joy, though we always had fun ourselves.

=== Diana, Princess of Wales ===
The brand received international attention when Diana, Princess of Wales (then Lady Diana Spencer) wore a red Warm & Wonderful sheep jumper in 1981. Photographs of Diana wearing the sweater were circulated widely in the international media. Many members of the press speculated that the sweater was a metaphor, signaling to the world that Diana felt like the "black sheep" of the Royal Family. Diana wore the Warm & Wonderful sheep jumper again in 1983, eliciting further media attention.

=== Re-launch ===
In 2020, American designer Jack Carlson helped to revive the label in partnership with Osborne and Muir. Together, they re-launched the original sheep sweater for the first time in over twenty-five years (initially as a collaboration with the brand Rowing Blazers) and then re-established the Warm & Wonderful brand in its own right with Carlson serving as the label's creative director.

Since then, Warm & Wonderful has been featured in Vogue, ELLE, The Telegraph, The Times, Tatler, Harper's Bazaar, People, The Financial Times, Town and Country, Vanity Fair, and The New Yorker.

In 2021 and 2022, Warm & Wonderful launched collaborations with luxury British luggage manufacturer Globe-Trotter and with heritage footwear company Sperry Top-Sider, featuring luggage and handbags, and canvas sneakers, respectively, emblazoned with its famous sheep motif.

== Products and distribution ==
Aside from its famous sheep sweater in a range of colours, Warm & Wonderful has offered other knitwear designs over the years, ranging from other humorous or country-themed graphic jumpers to solid-colour Shetland, cashmere, and cotton knits. The label has also created accessories and other apparel featuring its sheep motif, including its collaborations with Globe-Trotter and Sperry.

Warm & Wonderful knitwear has been sold at Saks, Henri Bendel, Barneys, Bergdorf Goodman, Neiman Marcus, Liberty, Isetan, Mitsukoshi, Le Bon Marché, and many other stores over the years; and since 1982, Osborne and Muir have operated shops in Wandsworth, Primrose Hill, and Brighton — most recently opening a pop-up shop in London's Seven Dials district, very near the original market stall in Covent Garden in 2021.

== Impact ==
Actress Emma Corrin, portraying Princess Diana, wore a Warm & Wonderful sheep sweater on the Netflix series The Crown.

The Victoria & Albert Museum, Britain's national archive of textiles and fashion, features a Warm & Wonderful sheep jumper in its permanent collection as part of Britain's national cultural heritage.

In 2023, Sotheby's announced that it would be bringing Diana's original Warm & Wonderful sweater to auction during New York Fashion Week, headlining its inaugural "Fashion Icons" sale. The sweater, which carried an estimate of $50,000-$80,000, sold for $1.14 million, making it the most valuable sweater in history.
