= St. John Knits =

American fashion brand

St. John Knits International Inc.
- Type: Subsidiary
- Industry: Fashion
- Founded: 1962; 64 years ago
- Founder: Robert and Marie Gray
- Headquarters: Irvine, California, United States
- Area served: Worldwide
- Key people: Robert Gray; Marie Gray
- Products: Womenswear, perfume, jewelry, fashion accessory
- Revenue: €79 million (2024)
- Operating income: €54 million (2024)
- Net income: €8 million (2024)
- Owner: Fosun International
- Parent: Lanvin Groupe SA
- Website: www.stjohnknits.com

St. John Knits International Inc., commonly referred as St. John, is a luxury American fashion brand that specializes in women's knitwear founded in 1962 by Robert and Marie Gray. The company is best known for its classic wool and rayon yarn knits, Chanel inspired jackets, and extensive use of primary colors. The brand is owned by Fosun International under their Lanvin Group subsidiary. Headquartered in Anaheim, California, the brand has its collections and styles sold in specialty stores in 29 countries and 27 company-owned retail boutiques in the United States. The company has an estimated 1,300 employees and 2010 sales of $325 million. Humberto Leon is the creative director.

== History ==
St. John was founded in 1962 by former model Marie St John and her husband Robert Gray. While working in Los Angeles as a model, St John hand knit simple straight knit skirts and matching short sleeved tops for her own use. Her designs proved popular among her fellow models and she began designing and producing samples. Her fiancé at the time, Robert Gray, showed the designs to local retailer Bullock's who ordered 84 dresses. St John and Gray hired their mothers and another knitter and quickly set about production. The couple, now married, divided duties over the fledgling Irvine, California business. St John designed the clothes and oversaw production while Gray handled the marketing and sales. Their collections included tailored suits and dresses as well as casual sportswear.

In 1990, Escada, formed by another husband and wife team Margaretha and Wolfgang Ley, purchased an 80% stake in St John Knits for $45 million. St John Knits used the funding to launch its own boutique stores. St John became a public company in 1993, with St John and Gray retaining 20% of the company. St John continued to manage the creative direction of the company while Gray was CEO and chairman. Their daughter, Kelly Gray, was appointed president of the company in 1996, ascending to the CEO position after her father's retirement in 2002. The Grays left St John Knits in 2005 when the company was purchased by a private equity firm. The pair were brought back two years later as creative consultants after a series of disappointing collections and declining sales.

The original face of the brand was model Kelly Gray, the daughter of the founders. Following Gray, supermodel Gisele Bündchen became the new face of St. John in 2005. Beginning in 2005, Angelina Jolie became the face and spokeswoman for St. John. The campaigns were all shot by Mario Testino. In 2010, St. John announced that they were replacing Jolie with British supermodel and musician Karen Elson after her three-year campaign as the face of the company, because Jolie's fame had "overshadowed the brand." In 2011, Kate Winslet was named the face of St John, a position she continues to hold as of 2015.

″St. John Knits' sold to large, established retailers such as Jacobson's and Lord & Taylor. The company's typical retail customer favoured a conservative fashion style. As one retail consultant explained, "For ladies who lunch, a St. John knit is almost like a uniform, a status symbol, generations of women made the inclusion of a St. John knit in their wardrobe a must.″ A St. John's garment can be identified by its knit-in hem (most companies use sewn-in hems) and, the tightly woven wool and rayon double knit fabric developed by Marie St John in the year 1962. The St. John Sport line contains more up to date styles.

In 2013, Chinese company Fosun International acquired a 30% stake in St. John, and went on to acquire a majority stake in 2017. In 2022, as part of Lanvin Group, St John became a publicly traded company on the New York Stock Exchange via a SPAC merger.

From 2019 to 2023, Zoe Turner was the creative director of St John. Prior to St John, she had experience at Christian Dior Couture, Alberta Ferretti and Max Mara. During her tenure, she revitalized the brand by focusing on younger more daring silhouettes and red carpet celebrity dressing. Her work was seen on stars including Gigi Hadid, Zendaya, Lupita Nyong'o, Alicia Keys, and Sarah Jessica Parker.

Following Turner's departure, St John appointed Enrico Chiarparin as creative director in 2023. During his tenure, he worked closely with star stylist Karla Welch, and had prior experience at Calvin Klein, James Perse, and Miu Miu. Humberto Leon was announced as the label's creative director in 2026. Business woman Tina Knowles, a longtime fan of the brand, was selected as the face of the creative relaunch.
