= Gabriela Hearst =

Uruguayan fashion designer (born 1976)

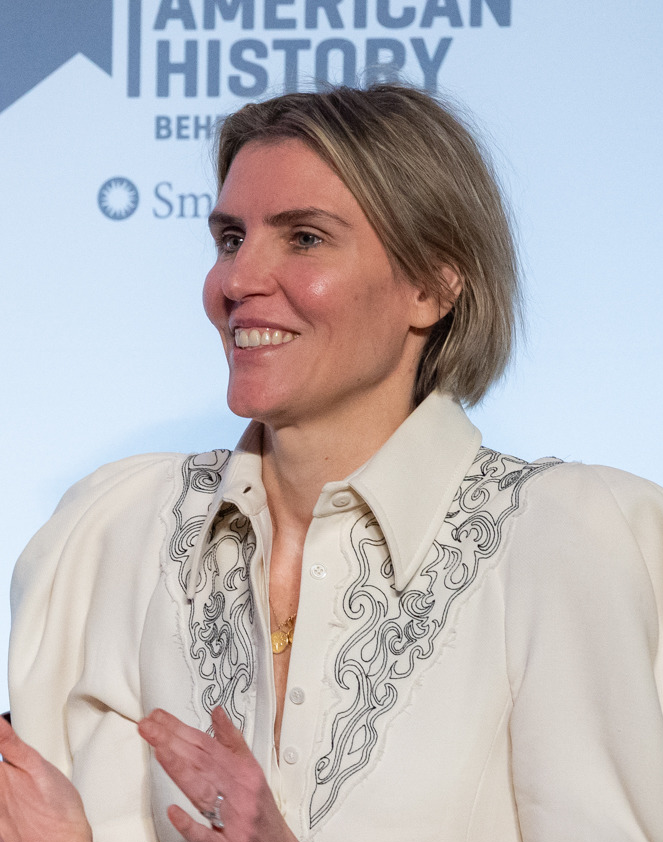
- Hearst in 2023
- Born: Gabriela Perezutti Souza; November 3, 1976 (age 50); Paysandú, Uruguay
- Education: Universidad ORT Uruguay
- Spouse: John Augustine Hearst (m. 2013)
- Children: 3

Gabriela Hearst (née Perezutti Souza; born November 3, 1976) is a Uruguayan fashion designer specializing in women’s ready-to-wear and accessories. She is the founder and creative director of her eponymous label and served as creative director of Chloé from 2020 to 2023, becoming the first Latin American to hold the position. In addition to her work in fashion, she manages and operates her family’s ranch in Uruguay.

== Early life and education ==
Gabriela Perezutti Souza was born on 3 November 1976 in Paysandú, Uruguay, to Julio “Lalo” Perezutti and Tonya Souza. She comes from a family of several generations of stockgrowers and was raised on the family’s 17,000-acre ranch, “Santa Isabel”.

She attended The British Schools of Montevideo and graduated from Universidad ORT Uruguay with a degree in Communication Sciences. After completing her studies, she spent a brief period in Paris, where she worked as a model, before moving to New York. There, she studied performing arts at the Neighborhood Playhouse School of the Theatre and worked at an audiovisual production company founded by Uruguayan associates.

== Career ==
In 2004, she started Candela in Brooklyn with $700. The collection was made of T-shirts with silk-screened illustrations of a winged woman on top of a horse (based on a photo of her mother). In 2006, the collection expanded to ready-to-wear and shoes.

After eleven years working in design, Hearst became a member of the CFDA in 2012.

In fall 2015, Hearst launched her eponymous label: Gabriela Hearst. The brand has been compared as an American competitor to Hermès for its high-quality and fine use of garments. The collections are characterized by quality craftsmanship, high-end and innovative materials.

Her line's first bag was the Nina Bag (named after Nina Simone), which started as a limited edition of 20 that Hearst gave to women she admired—some of them high-profile like Miroslava Duma and Brie Larson—as well as to women she enjoyed collaborating with, such as the owner of the factory or the shoe developer. The bag had an extensive waiting list as of 2017.

In January 2016, Hearst was included in the "Ten of Tomorrow" by Women's Wear Daily (WWD).

On September 9, 2017, Gabriela Hearst was added to the Business of Fashion BOF500 2017—the professional index of the people shaping the global fashion industry.

In January 2021 Hearst designed the dress worn by First Lady Jill Biden for the 2021 presidential inauguration: an ivory dress representing the new administration's message of unity that was embroidered with each of the 50 state's flowers and that of D.C. This dress was later added to the Smithsonian's First Ladies Collection at the Smithsonian's National Museum of American History's. The ensemble includes an ivory double-breasted cashmere coat, an ivory silk wool cady dress and face mask, with embroidery reflecting the federal flowers from every state and territory of the U.S. as a symbol of unity.

In December 2021 Hearst was nominated by the Financial Times as one of the 25 most influential women of the year.

In 2024, Hearst designed the costumes for the premiere of Carmen at San Francisco Ballet as part of Dos Mujeres, the company’s first-ever double bill of works by Latina choreographers.

In March 2024, TIME announced Hearst as one of the honorees of the 2024 TIME Earth Awards, which recognizes individuals influencing the future of the planet through their work on climate justice, awareness, and activism.

In 2025, Hearst was included in the inaugural National Geographic 33, a list honoring 33 global changemakers recognized for their impact in fields such as science, culture, and social innovation.

=== Chloé ===
In December 2020 Hearst was named Creative Director of Chloé, the luxury prêt-à-porter brand launched in 1952 by Gaby Aghion. Gabriela Hearst is the first female designer with a multicultural heritage to both Uruguay and the United States to take the helm of a Paris fashion house. In 2023, Hearst stepped down as the creative director of Chloé; her last show was on September 28.

== Sustainability ==
On February 14, 2017, Gabriela Hearst presented its first runway show at the Refectory of the High Line Hotel. The catwalk show instated a no-plastic policy, and was furnished with pews and chairs borrowed from her home and office.

For SS20, Gabriela Hearst collaborated with Bureau Betak and EcoAct, an international advisory council that works with businesses to address sustainability challenges, to reduce the carbon footprint of her show. The show booked models that did not have to fly and used catering services that cook with local and seasonal food.

== Collaborations ==
In August 2023, Hearst launched her first fragrance, in collaboration with Fueguia 1833, with two unique scents inspired by the two geographies of her life: Paysandú and New York.

For the 2024 Met Gala, Hearst collaborated with Lily Gladstone on the design of a custom black silk wool bustier dress and black silk organza cape with hand-embroidered stars handcrafted, from recycled silver and glass beads by Ataumbi Metals, a fine jewelry label by Indigenous jeweler and metalsmith artist Keri Ataumbi. A total of 493 stars and glass beads were hand-crafted and hand-embroidered, taking over 120 hours to complete.

Hearst designed the tailored uniforms for the Uruguay national football team for the 2026 FIFA World Cup. The made-to-measure suits were crafted from fine Uruguayan merino wool, using fibers sourced in the northern regions of the country.

== Philanthropy ==
In June 2016, she started a collaboration with Tod's to update their classic slip-on sneaker with a men's brogue detail in Morse code that reads "love"—20 percent of proceeds went to Save the Children. To promote the project, Gabriela Hearst organized a portrait project featuring Dakota Fanning, Miroslava Duma, Lindsey Adelman, Lauren Hutton, and the Save the Children donor Dorrit Morley and member Zaineb Malick.

In May 2017, Hearst produced a hundred pieces of a limited-edition sweater called Ram Ovaries. The design was a representation of strength symbolized by the use of a woman's reproductive system and ram's horns. The profits from the sales were used to support Planned Parenthood.

In September 2018, following several philanthropic campaigns, Hearst started serving on the Save the Children's Board of Trustees.

== Awards ==
Year	Awarding Organization	Category	Result	Ref
2016	Woolmark	Womenswear USA Prize Final	Won	
2017	Woolmark	Womenswear International Prize	Won	
2017	CFDA	Swarovski Award for Emerging Talent	Nominated	
2018	Pratt Institute's	Pratt Fashion Visionary Award	Won	
2018	CFDA	Womenswear Designer of the Year	Nominated	
2020	CFDA	American Womenswear Designer of the Year	Won	
2020	CFDA	American Accessories Designer of the Year	Nominated	
2020	The Fashion Awards	Environment	Won	
2021	Frank Alvah Parsons Award	Sustainability	Won	
2021	FGI Night of Stars	Sustainability	Won	
2021	CFDA	Womenswear Designer of the Year	Nominated	
2021	CFDA	American Accessories Designer of the Year	Nominated	
2021	The Fashion Awards	Leaders of Change Award, Environment	Won	
2021	Savvy Awards	Award for Innovation & Creativity	Won	
2022	International Center of Photography Infinity Awards	Infinity Trustees Award	Won	
2022	CFDA	Womenswear Designer of the Year	Nominated	
2022	The Fashion Awards	Leaders of Change Award, Environment	Won	
2023	Fashion Institute of Technology	2023 Couture Council Award For Artistry Of Fashion	Won	
2024	Time	2024 Time Earth Awards	Won	
2025	National Geographic	National Geographic 33	Included	

== Retail ==
Hearst is sold at more than 50 retailers in several countries, including Forty Five Ten, Le Bon Marchè, The Line, Bergdorf Goodman, Selfridges, Matches Fashion, Boon the Shop, Lane Crawford, and others. In November 2018, Hearst opened its first flagship store, located on Madison Avenue, adjacent to the New York institution that is the Carlyle Hotel. Following Hearst's mission on sustainability, the store was built without synthetics or chemicals, using natural, non-treated reclaimed oak. The lifestyle and fashion magazine Vogue has claimed it as "the most beautiful store in New York City".

Since January 2019, Gabriela Hearst has been working along with Sir Norman Foster to design the first London flagship store, which occupies a corner of a late-19th-century building in Mayfair. As all the aspects of Gabriela Hearst brand, every detail of the boutique has been dictated by sustainability. The custom-built Benchmark furniture has been made in Hungerford from a London plane tree that fell in a recent storm in Lincoln, the floor is reclaimed oak herringbone, the lights are on automatic dimmers, the leather has been dyed using non-toxic vegetable dyes, and the curtains are linen rather than cotton. The feeling of the store is described by Gabriela Hearst as "anti-retail", pervaded by serenity and calmness, avoiding the visual over-hyping.

On November 9, 2023, Hearst opened the first store and flagship on the West Coast on Wilshire Boulevard in Beverly Hills, designed by Foster + Partners led by Norman Foster and featuring a bespoke ‘Nomad’ furniture collection by Benji Gavron and Antoine Dumas of Gavron Dumas Studio, with an emphasis on natural materials inspired by Hearst's family ranch in Uruguay.

== Personal life ==
Gabriela Perezutti married John "August" Augustine Hearst in 2013. She currently lives in Manhattan with her husband and their children.
