= NIHI Sumba =

Resort on Sumba Island, Indonesia

- Industry: Hotel
- Founded: 1988; 38 years ago
- Headquarters: Sumba Island, Indonesia
- Key people: Christopher Burch (owner); James McBride (co-founding partner and CEO)
- Website: nihi.com

NIHI Sumba is a luxury resort on the western coast of Sumba Island in eastern Indonesia. The resort has 27 villas and spans across 567 acres of jungle.

== History ==
NIHI Sumba was built in 1988 at Nihiwatu by Claude and Petra Graves and acquired by Chris Burch and James McBride in 2012. The history of NIHI Sumba traces back to the early settlers who named the beach Nihiwatu, meaning "mortar stone," after its isolated rock formation along the tide. In 1988, Claude and Petra Graves established a hotel resort called Nihiwatu, later renamed NIHI Sumba. In 2012, the resort was acquired by Christopher Burch, an American entrepreneur, and James McBride, a South African-born hotelier.

== Facilities ==
Nihi Sumba offers 27 private villas comprising 38 rooms available in one, two, three, four, or five-bedroom configurations, each featuring a private infinity pool. Guests can partake in various amenities and activities.

NIHI Sumba introduced an 'equine wellness program' that makes it the first hotel in the world to have horses available for therapy and wellness purposes around-the-clock at the spa.

The resort engages in initiatives such as organic gardening, composting, water recycling, and community outreach programs. Through its Corporate Social Responsibility (CSR) program in partnership with The Sumba Foundation.

== Awards and recognition ==
NIHI Sumba was ranked fourth on the Travel + Leisure Readers' 5 Favorite Resorts in Indonesia of 2023 list, and appeared in 18th position in The World's 50 Best Hotels on Condé Nast Traveller’s Gold List 2023. Additionally, the resort has been designated as the Best of the Best by TripAdvisor Travelers' Choice of 2022, chosen as one of the world’s top seven eco-hotels by Travel Advice in 2022, and selected as Travel + Leisure’s Best Hotel in the World for two consecutive years in 2016 and 2017.

NIHI Sumba was in 36th position on Travel + Leisure’s Top 100 Hotels in the World list.
