= Kenzo (brand) =

French luxury fashion house

Kenzo S.A.

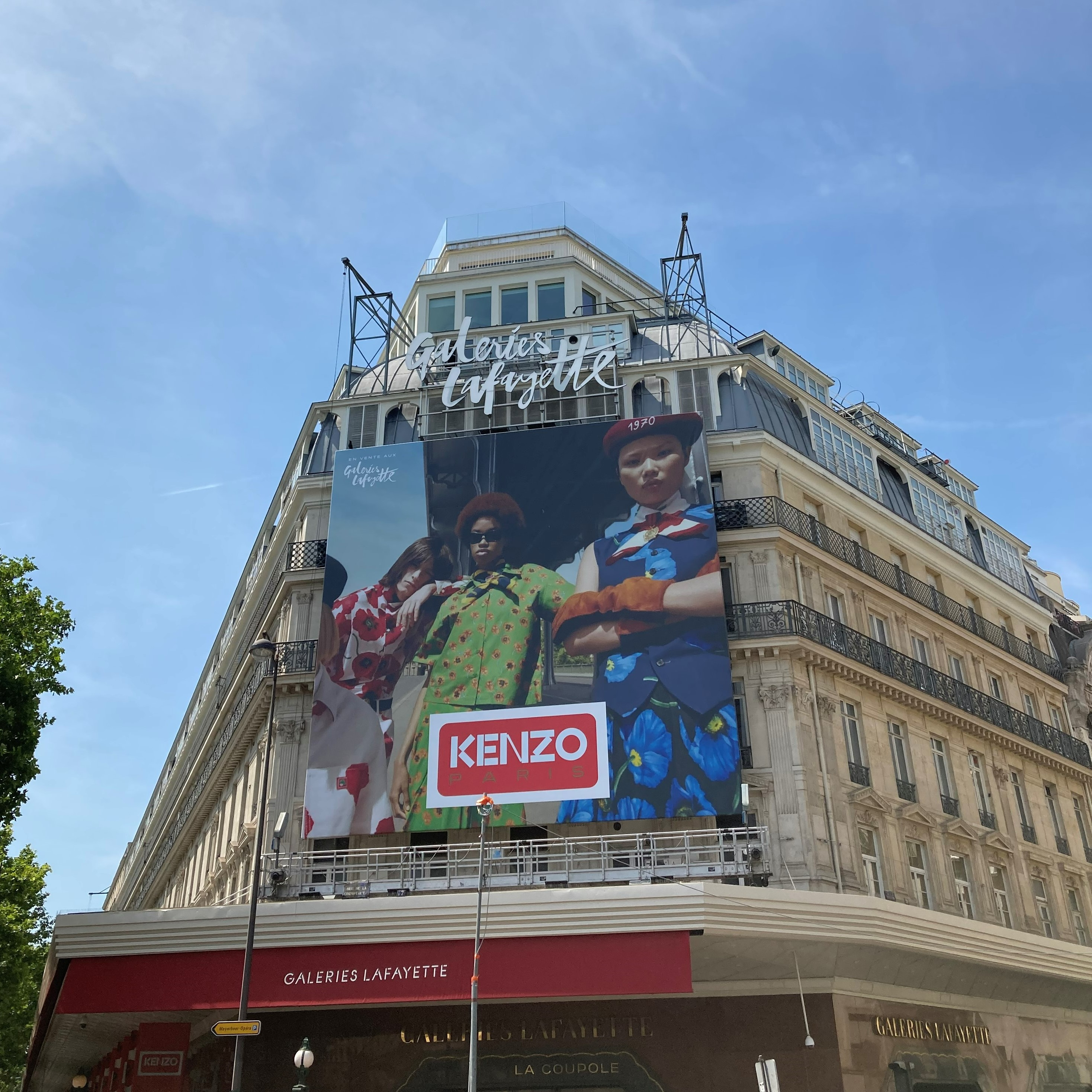
- Type: Subsidiary
- Industry: Fashion
- Founded: 1970; 56 years ago
- Founder: Kenzo Takada
- Headquarters: 18 rue Vivienne, 75002, Paris, France
- Number of locations: 104 stores worldwide (2025)
- Key people: Nigo (Artistic Director), Charlotte Coupé (CEO)
- Number of employees: 800
- Parent: LVMH
- Website: www.kenzo.com

Kenzo S.A. (stylized as KENZO PARIS) is a French luxury fashion house founded in 1970 by Japanese designer Kenzo Takada and owned by parent company LVMH.

== History ==
=== Kenzo Takada, 1970–1998 ===
Kenzo Takada was born in Japan and moved to Paris in 1964 to start his fashion career. He then became known for using Asian influenced style with the construction of European fashion. He started with a 'Jungle Jap' boutique located at Galerie Vivienne and decorated in jungle inspired interior. He began with handmade women's clothing; reportedly, he made his first collection with $200 worth of fabrics bought at a large discount house in Montmartre. The brand became Kenzo after a fashion show in New York in 1976, as the American market considered 'Jungle Jap' too pejorative.

In 1983, Kenzo started designing men and then kids and home collections in 1987, followed by fragrances in 1988.

In 1990, following the death of his life partner, Xavier, and a stroke suffered by his business partner, Takada decided to sell the company.

In 1993, luxury-products maker LVMH acquired Kenzo from SEBP and Financière Truffaut for about $80 million. From 1995, Kenzo also produced Kenzo Studio, a line was produced through a licensing agreement with the Bonaventure Group. While Kenzo developed the line's fashion direction, Studio was sold only in the U.S. and Kenzo retail stores in China.

Kenzo Takada stayed at the label for a few years and retired from fashion in 1999 at the age of 60.

=== Later years ===
From 1999 until 2003, Gilles Rosier and Roy Krejberg designed the women's and men's lines, respectively.

From 2006 until 2008, over 100 of Kenzo's stores worldwide were refurbished.

From 2008 until 2011, Antonio Marras served as Kenzo's creative director, overseeing the brand in its entirety. By 2011, Kenzo barely broke even, with annual sales estimated at 150 million euros ($197.4 million).

In 2011, Carole Lim and Humberto Leon of Opening Ceremony were appointed co-creative directors. The pair was credited with revitalizing the Kenzo brand and making it appeal to a younger customer, as well as re-defining and expanding the role of a fashion creative director to encompass all elements of creative work at a brand, not just designing the garments.

By 2017, Kenzo built the accessories and shoe business to almost 30 percent of revenues. Lim and Leon exited Kenzo in 2019. Also in 2019, Kenzo ended its distribution agreement with I.T to take back control of its 35 stores in China via a joint venture with the same partner.

Under the creative direction of Felipe Oliveira Baptista from 2019 to 2021, Kenzo launched a line of men's and women's sportswear, titled Kenzo Sport. In April 2021, Kenzo said it would part ways with Oliveira Baptista by the end of his term in June.

In September 2021, Kenzo appointed Nigo (formerly A Bathing Ape) as their new artistic director.

== Other activities ==
From 2010 to 2018, Kenzo worked with French manufacturer L'Amy on the production and distribution of its eyewear collections.

== Locations ==
Kenzo has expanded rapidly in the time since its first American store has opened, as of June 2021 it now operates 6 locations in the US:

- Wynn Las Vegas-3131 Las Vegas Blvd
- New York City The Shops & Restaurants at Hudson Yards-20 Hudson Yards
- SoHo, Manhattan-107 Grand Street
- Beverly Center-8500 Beverly Blvd
- Cabazon-48400 Seminole Dr
- Woodbury Commons (New York)

In the early 2000s, Kenzo pulled out of the American market, closing its flagship stores in Los Angeles (2002) and New York (2003). In June 2020, the brand unveiled a new American flagship store in SoHo, Manhattan.

Additionally it has nearly 145 stores worldwide primarily concentrated in Southeast Asia, Japan and Europe.

== Role in popular culture ==
The character Kenzo Harper in the BBC sitcom My Family is named after the fashion brand. In 2012, designers Humberto Leon and Carol Lim unveiled a knitted sweater with a tiger graphic on it for Kenzo's Fall 2012 collection. Leon wanted to make a sweatshirt version of the sweater for him to wear. Despite initial resistance from Kenzo's design team, the tiger sweatshirts became extremely popular, with the initial run of sweatshirts selling out within hours at Kenzo's Paris location. Since 2011, the tiger shirt and clothing designed by Leon and Lim has been worn by celebrities and fashion bloggers including Jay Z, Kevin Hart, Beyoncé, Zooey Deschanel, Swizz Beatz, Selena Gomez, Spike Jonze, Joan Smalls, Lorde, NorthernSound and Rihanna.

== Collaborations ==
In 2016, Kenzo announced its collaboration with H&M. Kenzo X H&M collection was released on November 3, 2016. The fashion house also collaborates with Inglot Cosmetics company, which manufactures make-up products. On March 21, 2018, Kenzo revealed Britney Spears as the face of its new 'La Collection Memento No. 2' campaign. The collaboration, marketed as #KenzoLovesBritney, features a variety of ready-to-wear nostalgic denim pieces for men and women.

== Campaigns ==
Kenzo has been working with several high-profile photographers for its advertisement campaigns, including Jean-Baptiste Mondino (1996–1999), David LaChapelle (2019), Keizō Kitajima (2024) and Bruce Gilden (2025).

For the Fall 2014 collection, Kenzo collaborated with filmmaker David Lynch, who mixed the soundtrack for the show and provided a large sculpture.

For the Fall and Winter 2016 collection, Kenzo produced the campaign film The Realest Real starring Laura Harrier, Mahershala Ali, Natasha Lyonne, and Rowan Blanchard, and directed by Carrie Brownstein. Also in 2016, Sean Baker (The Florida Project, Red Rocket) directed a short film starring model Abbey Lee called Snowbird for Kenzo SS16.

In 2023, Kenzo selected Vernon, a member of South Korean boy band Seventeen, as the brand's first global ambassador.

== Designers ==
- Kenzo Takada, 1970–2020
- Gilles Rosier, 2000–2004
- Antonio Marras, 2004–2011
- Humberto Leon and Carol Lim, 2012–2019
- Felipe Oliveira Baptista, 2019–2021
- Nigo, 2021–present
