= Opening Ceremony (brand) =

American clothing brand

- Type: Private
- Industry: Retail
- Founded: September 2002; 24 years ago in New York City, United States
- Founders: Carol Lim; Humberto Leon
- Headquarters: New York City, United States
- Area served: United States
- Products: Clothing
- Website: openingceremony.com

Opening Ceremony is a fashion brand founded in 2002 by Carol Lim and Humberto Leon. The brand designs and creates its own products and also retails other emerging fashion labels, being early retailers of Havaianas and Topshop, and also Alexander Wang, Comme Des Garcons, Proenza Schouler and Rodarte. The cofounders believed that a person willing to buy luxury goods would also be willing to buy cheap T-shirts, socks, and art pieces in the same retail space.

In January 2020, Opening Ceremony was acquired by New Guards Group, a subsidiary of Farfetch. In late 2023, Farfetch was itself acquired by the South Korean e-commerce company Coupang for $500 million.

== History ==
=== Founding ===
Carol Lim and Humberto Leon opened Opening Ceremony in downtown New York in 2002.

=== Stores ===
The Tokyo store, located in Shibuya, was ranked by the American magazine Complex as the fourth-best store in the world in 2013. Opening Ceremony also operated a store in Los Angeles.

=== Collaborations ===
In 2008, Chloë Sevigny designed a clothing line with Opening Ceremony, working closely with co-founder Humberto Leon. The collection sold at Barneys nationwide. In 2009, Opening Ceremony collaborated with Spike Jonze on a collection tied to his film adaptation of Where the Wild Things Are, with jewelry provided by Pamela Love. In 2010, Opening Ceremony collaborated with Maison Margiela on the French fashion house's first co-branded project, followed by a womenswear line for Margiela's MM6 label in 2011. In 2017, Esprit and Opening Ceremony created a joint collection. In 2018, Opening Ceremony partnered with Crosby Studios to produce a collection of tables, chairs, and furniture in monochromatic royal purple. The Spring 2018 collection was presented after hours at Disneyland's Toontown to mark Mickey Mouse's 90th birthday, with Mickey and Minnie Mouse walking the runway.

=== Fashion shows ===
Opening Ceremony often replaced traditional runway presentations with performance art. For the Spring 2015 collection, American actor Jonah Hill wrote the one-act play Lost Cotton. In 2015, choreographer Justin Peck of the New York City Ballet directed the Spring 2016 show, in which models collapsed to the ground and rose again, performing in a garden setting. The collection incorporated bonsai embroidery, African textiles, and Moorish-inspired silhouettes.

For Fall 2017, Spike Jonze directed and Ryan Heffington choreographed "Changers," a dance piece about a romantic relationship, starring Lakeith Stanfield and Mia Wasikowska at La MaMa Experimental Theatre Club. That year, the brand also collaborated with the New York City Ballet on "The Times Are Racing," dressing dancers in casual attire.

The Spring 2019 show, "The Gift of Showz," was held at (Le) Poisson Rouge and featured Sasha Velour, Shea Couleé, Lypsinka, West Dakota, and 40 other drag queens; Christina Aguilera opened the finale. The collection featured summer dresses and floral prints alongside all-black outfits.

=== Lookbooks ===
In 2008, Chloë Sevigny modelled in and published a lookbook with Opening Ceremony, photographed by Mark Borthwick.

For their February 2019 lookbook, Leon and Lim featured Asian-American figures including musician Ryuichi Sakamoto, chef Angela Dimayuga, and designer Anna Sui.

=== Kenzo ===
In 2011, Lim and Leon became co-creative directors of Kenzo, owned by LVMH.

In 2019, they announced they were stepping down after reacquiring all shares of Opening Ceremony from Berkshire Partners, which had held a minority stake. Their final Kenzo show was on June 23, 2019, for the Spring 2020 collection.

=== Acquisition and store closures ===
On January 13, 2020, the company was acquired by New Guards Group, which owns Off-White and other streetwear brands. On January 14, Lim and Leon announced that all retail stores would close that year, citing rapid changes in consumer behaviour and shopping habits.

Under New Guards Group, the brand continued releasing collections.

== In popular culture ==
- In 2016, Drake wore the bright orange hoodie and sweatpants from the Opening Ceremony x Esprit collection.
- Troye Sivan and Nicki Minaj, along with other LGBTQIA+ models, attended the brand's Spring 2019 drag-inspired fashion show.
- Rihanna wore Opening Ceremony on the cover of her album Talk That Talk (2011).
- Omarion wore an Opening Ceremony varsity jacket in the music video for his 2014 song "Post to Be".
- The Linda Lindas wore Opening Ceremony on the back cover of their album Growing Up (2022).

== See also ==
- Kenzo
