= J. Christopher Burch =

American businessman

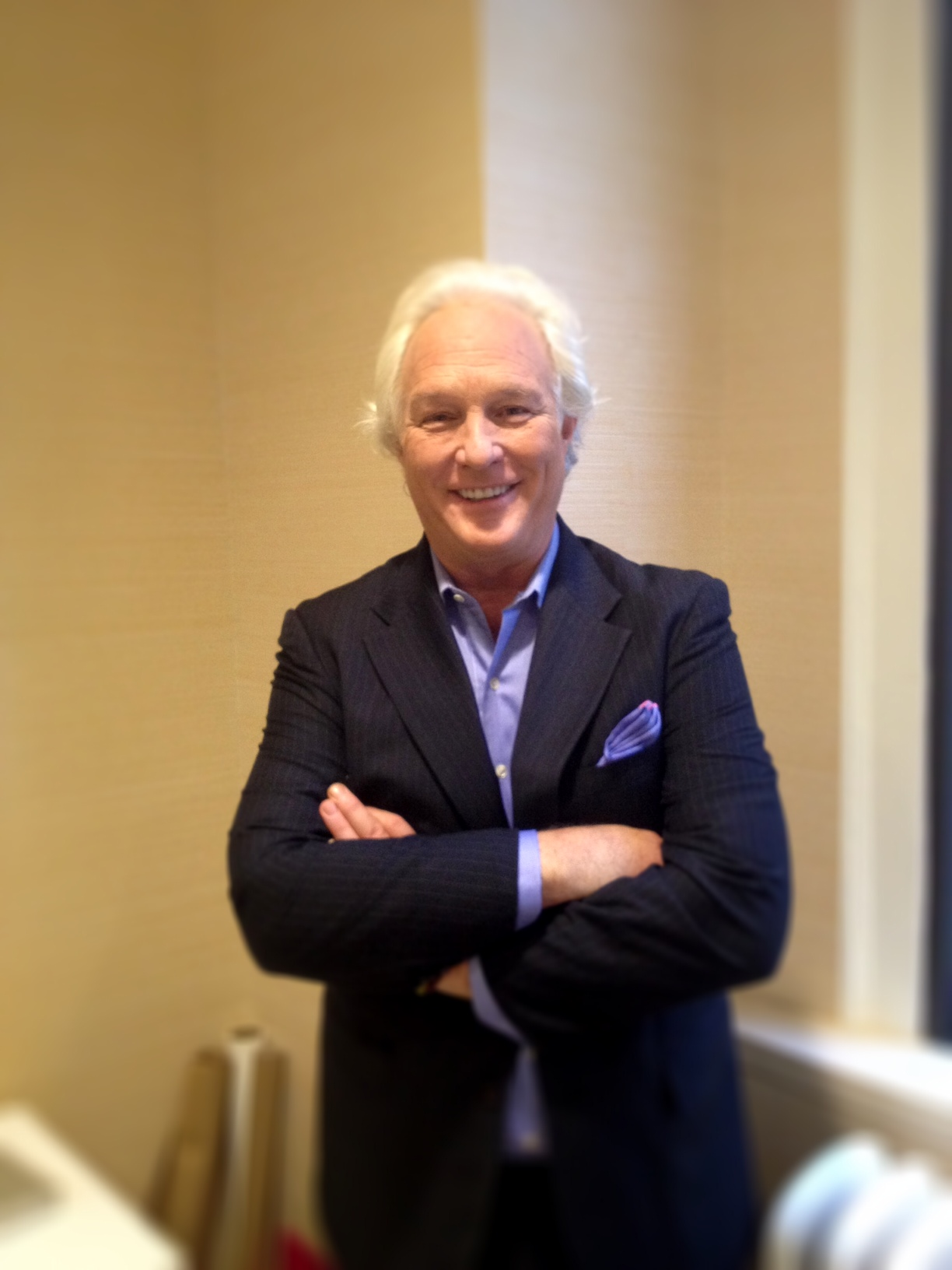
- Burch in 2012
- Born: March 28, 1953 (age 73); Bryn Mawr, Pennsylvania, US
- Education: Ithaca College
- Occupations: Founder, Burch Creative Capital
- Known for: Fashion industry businessman
- Spouses: Susan Cole (m. 1982, divorced) Tory Robinson (m. 1996; div. 2006)
- Children: 6

J. Christopher Burch (born March 28, 1953) is an American businessman, founder and CEO of Burch Creative Capital, and co-founder of Tory Burch LLC.

== Early life ==
Burch was raised in Wayne, Pennsylvania. His mother, Robin Sinkler, was from a Philadelphia Main Line family and his father, John Walter Burch, owned a mining equipment and supplies company. Burch attended Tilton School, an independent prep school in Tilton, New Hampshire. He graduated from Tilton in 1972, and then attended Ithaca College.

== Career ==
=== Fashion industry ===
In 1976, while an undergraduate at Ithaca, Burch and his brother Robert started Eagle Eye apparel with a $2,000 investment, buying sweaters for $10 and selling them for $15. They produced a brand of "preppy" sweaters which were sold door-to-door on campus. The operation soon expanded to other campuses, and, eventually, to retail stores. Over the next decade, the company expanded to $140 million in sales and a national distribution footprint, including more than 50 of its own retail stores. The company was partially sold to Swire Group, in 1989, and entirely in 1998, in a deal that valued the brand at $60 million.

In 2004, Burch helped his then-wife launch the Tory Burch fashion label, and served as co-Chairman of the company. He also owned 28.3%, selling half of his shares in December 2012, when the company was estimated to be worth $3.5 billion. In 2008, he established J. Christopher Capital LLC, later renamed Burch Creative Capital. In 2011, he launched C. Wonder, an apparel, accessories and home decor retailer. The launch of this company sparked a bitter and highly-publicized legal battle with Tory Burch; the matter was settled out of court in 2012. In 2015, C. Wonder filed for bankruptcy and closed its stores; soon afterward, the brand was sold to Xcel Brands.

=== Real estate ===
In 2004, Burch partnered with architect Philippe Starck and hotelier Alan Faena to develop the Faena Hotel+Universe in Buenos Aires. The investment into the building, which was built in 1902 as a grain storage facility, was in excess of $100 million.

In 2006, Burch founded J.B. Christopher, a supplier of construction materials to real estate developers. In 2011, Burch and his partner Austin Hearst completed a $19 million luxury home development in Nantucket.

In 2013, in a partnership with James McBride, Burch acquired the Nihiwatu resort on the Indonesian island of Sumba. In 2015, after a $30 million investment, the pair opened the resort under the name NIHI.

=== Other investments ===
In 1993, Burch was a producer for the feature-length romantic comedy film Watch It. He was an early investor in the IPO for Internet Capital Group, and invested in Aliph Technologies, Powermat, and Poppin. In 2014, he led the investment in BaubleBar; that year he also partnered with Ellen DeGeneres to launch her lifestyles collection, ED by Ellen.

He has also been involved with the brands Staud, Voss, Win Brands, Rappi, Danielle Guizio, Solid & Striped, Urbanic, Thursday Boots, SuperOrdinary, Barber Surgeon Guild, and Jawbone

== Personal life ==
In 1982, Burch married Susan Cole. They had three daughters and divorced at an unknown date.

In 1996, he married the fashion designer Tory Robinson with whom he had three sons. They divorced in 2006.

Burch is a past president of The Pierre Hotel Co-op Board, and a past board member of Guggenheim Partners, and The Continuum Group.

From 1982 to 1985, Burch sat on the Board of Trustees of his alma mater, Tilton School. In 2013, Burch donated $1.3 million to the school.
