= Tory Burch =

American fashion designer and businesswoman (born 1966)

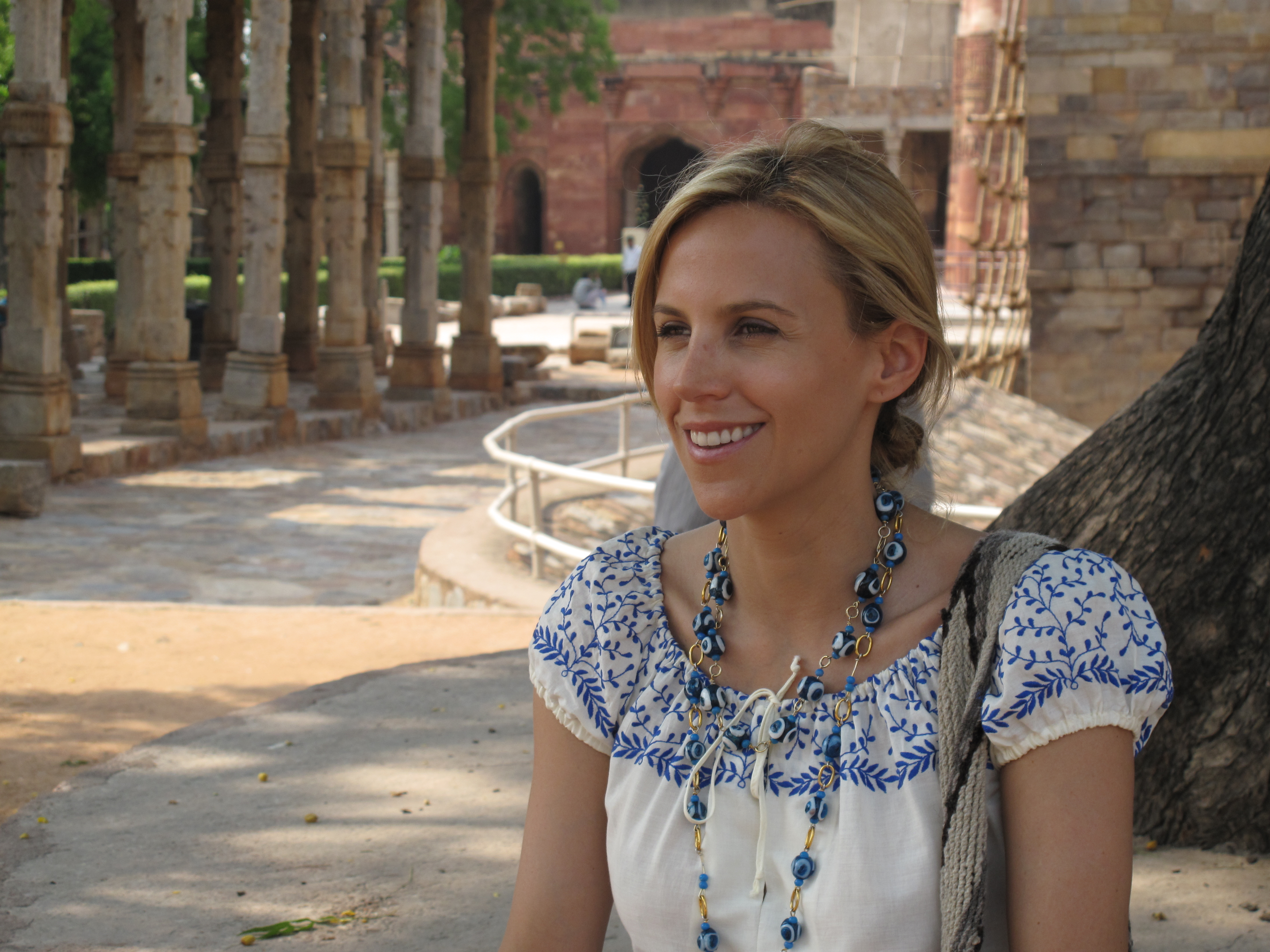
- Burch in 2009
- Born: Tory Robinson; June 17, 1966 (age 60); Valley Forge, Pennsylvania, U.S.
- Education: University of Pennsylvania (BA)
- Occupations: Fashion designer Chairman and Chief Creative Officer of Tory Burch LLC
- Spouse(s): William Macklowe (m. 1993; div. 1994) J. Christopher Burch (m. 1996; div. 2006) Pierre-Yves Roussel (m. 2018)

Tory Burch (née Robinson; born June 17, 1966) is an American fashion designer and businesswoman. She is the executive chairman and chief creative officer of her own brand, Tory Burch LLC. She was listed as the 88th most powerful woman in the world by Forbes in 2020.

== Early life and education ==
Burch was born in Valley Forge, Pennsylvania, the daughter of Reva (née Schapira) and Ira Earl "Bud" Robinson (1923–2007). She was raised with her three brothers in a 250-year-old Georgian farmhouse near Valley Forge National Historical Park.

Her father was a wealthy investor who inherited a stock exchange seat and a paper cup company. Burch is Jewish on her mother's side.

Burch attended the Agnes Irwin School in Rosemont, Pennsylvania, where she was a friend of jewelry designer Kara Ross. Her first job was at Benetton in the King of Prussia Mall. She then attended the University of Pennsylvania, where she majored in art history and graduated in 1988. Burch is a member of the Kappa Alpha Theta sorority. She has cited her participation in the undergraduate study-abroad program Semester at Sea as a formative experience. She stated that traveling around the world and witnessing poverty in developing countries influenced her interest in philanthropy and later helped inspire the creation of the Tory Burch Foundation.

== Career ==
=== Early work ===
After graduating from college, Tory moved to New York City, where she worked for Zoran, a Yugoslavian designer, followed by Harper's Bazaar magazine. She then moved into public relations and advertising positions at Vera Wang, Polo Ralph Lauren, and Loewe, when Narciso Rodriguez was there.

=== Fashion label ===
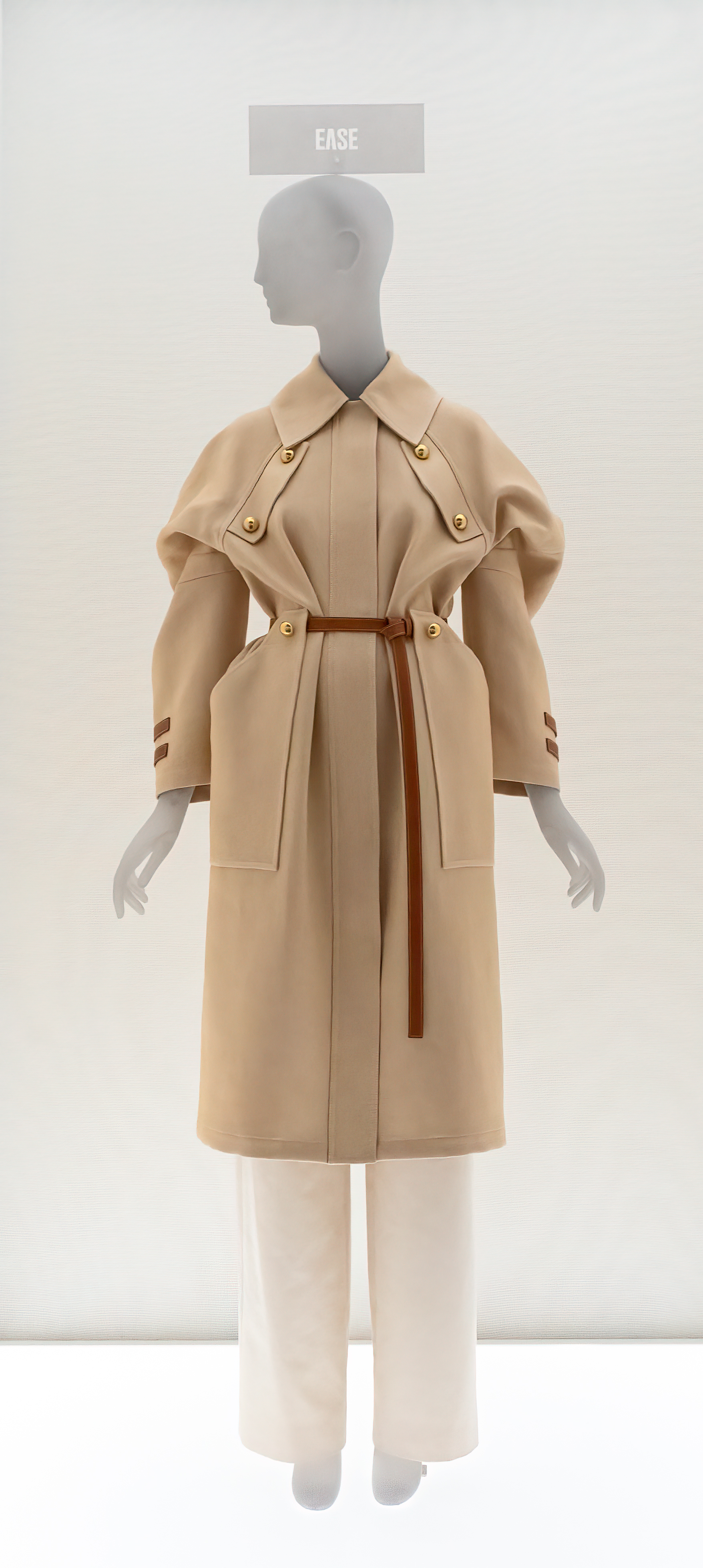
An ensemble Burch designed in 2018 on display in the In America: A Lexicon of Fashion exhibition at the Metropolitan Museum of Art

Burch began her fashion label – "TRB by Tory Burch", later known as Tory Burch – in February 2004, launching it with a retail store in Manhattan's Nolita district. By August 2025, it had grown to 400 stores worldwide; the fashion line is also carried at over 3,000 department and specialty stores worldwide.

In 2015, Burch also introduced a separate performance activewear line, Tory Sport.

=== Awards and recognition ===
In 2005, Burch won the Rising Star Award for Best New Retail Concept from the Fashion Group International. In 2007, she won the Accessory Brand Launch of the year award at the Accessories Council Excellence Awards. In 2008, she won the Council of Fashion Designers of America award for Accessories Designer of the Year.

From 2010 to 2020, Burch was included on Forbes' list of The World's 100 Most Powerful Women six times.

In 2015, Burch was included on Working Mother's list of the 50 Most Powerful Moms, and she received the Breast Cancer Research Foundation's Sandra Taub Humanitarian Award.

In November 2019, Burch was named a Glamour Woman of the Year. In November 2020, she was featured in a cover story in Forbes magazine on how her fashion company navigated the COVID-19 pandemic.

In 2021, she was named an inaugural member of the advisory council for the Smithsonian American Women's History Museum in Washington, DC.

In 2022, the Wharton School's Jay H. Baker Retailing Center and Retail Leaders Circle honored her with its inaugural Retail Excellence Award in recognition of her industry leadership and support of women entrepreneurs, she received the Parsons Table Award that, "recognizes individuals who have made a noteworthy impact on the design industry and have inspired our students," from the Parsons School of Design, and she received the CARE Impact Award for Women's Inspirational Leadership from CARE International.

In 2023, the CFDA Fashion Awards nominated Burch for Womenswear Designer of the Year, and Harper's Bazaar named her Designer of the Year.

In 2024, she was named one of the 100 most influential people in the world by Time magazine. and her company was included on Time's list of the 100 Most Influential Companies. Also in 2024, she was honored as WWD Women's Designer of the Year.

In 2025, she received the SCAD Étoile Award from Savannah College of Art and Design. In 2026, Burch was honored as Designer of the Year at the Fashion Trust U.S. Awards.

== Additional posts ==
Burch is on the board of directors of the Council of Fashion Designers of America, and is a sustaining member of the administrative board of the Society of Memorial Sloan-Kettering Cancer Center. She is an honorary trustee of the Barnes Foundation.

She is a member of the advisory council of the Smithsonian American Women's History Museum, and a member of the advisory board of the Jay H. Baker Retailing Center at the Wharton School of Business. She is a member of the Council on Foreign Relations.

== Philanthropy ==
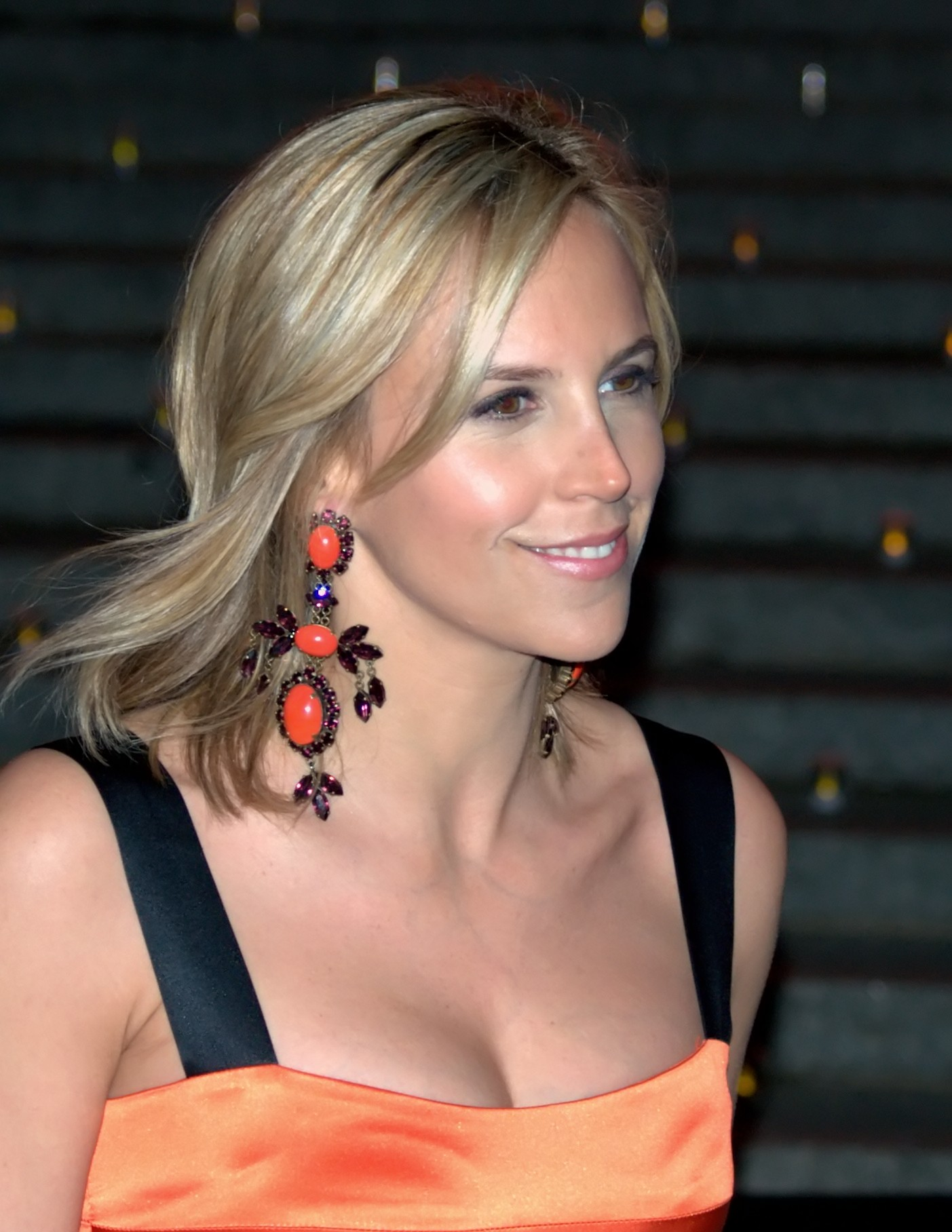
Burch at the 2009 Vanity Fair celebration for the Tribeca Film Festival

In 2009, Burch founded the Tory Burch Foundation, which supports the economic empowerment of women in the U.S. through small business loans, mentoring, and entrepreneurial education. The foundation offers a fellows program providing women entrepreneurs with business-education grants, mentoring, and networking opportunities.

In 2014, the foundation launched Elizabeth Street Capital, an initiative with Bank of America, to provide women entrepreneurs with access to low-cost loans and mentoring support. The initiative, originally named for the location of the first Tory Burch boutique, is now known as the Tory Burch Foundation Capital Program. By the end of 2023, it had disbursed $100 million in affordable loans to more than 5,500 women entrepreneurs.

In April 2014, the Obama administration named Burch an inaugural member of the Presidential Ambassadors for Global Entrepreneurship, a group of successful American businesspeople committed to developing the next generation of entrepreneurs in the U.S. and around the world.

In March 2017, to coincide with International Women's Day and Women's History Month, the Tory Burch Foundation launched Embrace Ambition, a global campaign to address the double standard that exists around ambition, which is often seen as a positive trait in men and a negative one in women. In April 2018, Burch and her foundation hosted the first Embrace Ambition Summit, an all-day event supporting women's ambition and examining stereotypes about women and ambition in the workplace, at Lincoln Center in New York and also viewable on the Tory Burch Foundation website.

In 2021, Burch announced the creation of an endowed scholarship fund at Parsons School of Design with a gift that will be matched to establish a $1,000,000 financial-aid fund.

== Controversy ==
In 2017, a Facebook Community called La Blouse Roumaine, which promoted Romanian traditional craftsmanship, pointed that an early 20th century Romanian coat displayed at the Metropolitan Museum of Art in New York was virtually identical to a coat in Burch's Resort 2018 collection which was initially marketed as a garment inspired by Africa. The Facebook group also pointed out that other pieces from the same collection had many similarities with Romanian garments, including the sweaters worn by the Romania national rugby union team at the 2015 Rugby World Cup. Burch acknowledged the similarity and responded: "In our effort to summarize the collection, we missed a reference to a beautiful Romanian coat which inspired one of the pieces. Whether it’s Romania, Uganda or France, we are a brand that strives to celebrate, honor and be inclusive of women from all countries and cultures, in the broadest way possible".

In March 2021, controversy rose over a jumper designed by Burch which closely resembled a traditional fishermen garment made in Póvoa de Varzim, Portugal. The stylist had initially marketed it as a 'Baja-inspired tunic', in reference to Baja California, a state in Mexico. Pictures of the piece led to criticism from Portuguese internet users and the mayor of Póvoa de Varzim. Burch issued an apology in her social media and changed the description of the piece to "Póvoa de Varzim-inspired sweater". Shortly afterwards, the Portuguese government announced its intention to take legal action and demand compensation for the heritage of Póvoa de Varzim, after which Burch removed the sweater from her website. In November 2021, the municipality of Póvoa de Varzim announced that a settlement with Burch had been reached out of court.

Pottery pieces created by Burch were also criticised as being virtually identical to Bordallo Pinheiro ceramics designs, which led to a protest from Bordallo Pinheiro owners Vista Alegre.

Internet users also noted that Burch's logo is similar to that of a Portuguese stylist, Nuno Gama, and the Order of Christ Cross, a historical Portuguese insignia.

== Personal life ==
In 1993, she married William Macklowe, son of real-estate tycoon Harry B. Macklowe, and was divorced within a year. In 1996, she married J. Christopher Burch, an investor in Internet Capital Group, a venture capital firm founded by Walter Buckley and Ken Fox. They have three sons: Henry, Nicholas "Nick", and Sawyer. She also has three stepdaughters from his previous marriage. They divorced in 2006. She continues to use his last name, and for some time continued to live with her children in their New York City apartment.

She dated Lance Armstrong in 2007. She was later linked to Lyor Cohen. In 2014, Burch began dating Pierre-Yves Roussel, the former chairman and CEO of LVMH. In 2016, they got engaged, and in November 2018, they married. He became CEO of Burch's company in early 2019, and Burch became executive chairman and chief creative officer.

Forbes estimated that she had a net worth at $1.0 billion in 2013, which declined to approximately $850 million by 2019. In November 2024, her net worth was reported to be $1.0 billion again.

== See also ==
- List of fashion designers
