= Tory Burch LLC =

American luxury fashion brand

- Type: Private
- Industry: Fashion
- Founded: February 2004; 22 years ago
- Founder: Tory Burch
- Headquarters: New York, New York, U.S.
- Number of locations: 400 (2026)
- Area served: Worldwide
- Key people: Pierre-Yves Roussel (CEO)
- Number of employees: 4,800 (2024)
- Website: toryburch.com

Tory Burch LLC is an American women's fashion label based in Manhattan, New York, United States. It was founded by American designer Tory Burch in 2004. As of 2019, Pierre-Yves Roussel is the CEO of the company.

== History ==
Tory Burch began her fashion label – "Tory by TRB", later known as "Tory Burch" – in February 2004, launching it with a retail store in Manhattan's Nolita district. Most of the inventory sold out on the first day. When Oprah Winfrey endorsed her line on The Oprah Winfrey Show in April 2005, calling Burch "the next big thing in fashion", Burch's website received eight million hits the following day.

Since launch, the company has grown to include 400 Tory Burch stores worldwide, including flagships in New York, Los Angeles, London, Paris, Rome, Tokyo, and Seoul, and ecommerce sites in seven languages. The company’s Shanghai flagship, which launched in 2014, is its largest. The fashion line, which encompasses ready-to-wear, shoes, handbags, accessories, watches, home decor, and a fragrance and beauty collection, is also carried at over 3,000 department and specialty stores worldwide, including Saks Fifth Avenue, Bergdorf Goodman, Neiman Marcus, Nordstrom, and Bloomingdale's, as well as Harrods, Harvey Nichols, Galeries Lafayette, Lane Crawford, and Isetan.

In 2009, Burch sold a minority stake in her company to a Mexican private equity firm, Tresalia Capital. Additional minority investors were added in December 2012 in conjunction with the settlement of a legal dispute between Burch and her ex-husband. This settlement is said to have removed a substantial obstacle to a forthcoming IPO, which has been the subject of considerable discussion in the financial and fashion industries. As of 2015, Burch had stated that there were no plans for the company to go public. In 2018, the company bought back Tresalia Capital's minority stake in the business.

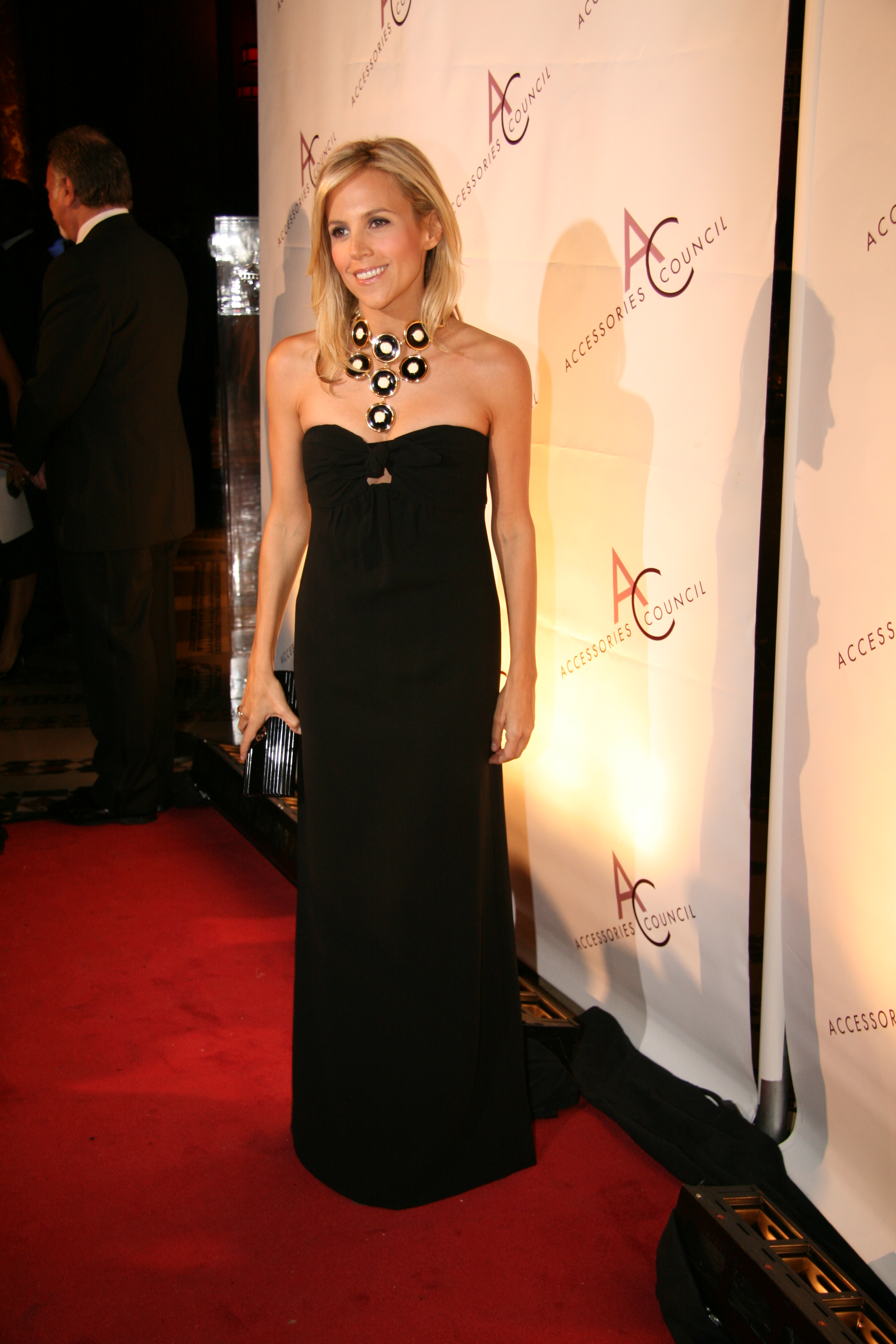
Burch at the 2007 Accessories Council Excellence Awards

In September 2011, Burch did her first runway fashion show, and has continued to show each season at New York Fashion Week.

In Fall 2013, Burch launched her first fragrance and a beauty capsule collection with Estée Lauder.

In Summer 2014, she introduced a line of accessories for the Fitbit Flex activity-tracking device, making hers the first major fashion brand to move into wearable technology. Fall 2014 marked the publication of her first and bestselling book, Tory Burch in Color, and the launch of watches with Fossil.

In March 2015, Burch extended her home line with a collection of lettuce ware created in collaboration with Palm Beach artist and potter Dodie Thayer. In July 2015, Burch launched her first boutique in Paris.

In August 2019, the brand announced that it had entered a long-term partnership with Shiseido to develop, market, and distribute Tory Burch beauty brands, beginning in January 2020.

In 2021, the Tory Burch company and the School of Fashion at Parsons School of Design announced a five-year multi-disciplinary educational partnership.

In 2022, the brand launched Essence of Dreams, a collection of five fragrances, with Shiseido.

In January 2024, Tory collaborated with Humberto Leon on a concept shop on Melrose Avenue in Los Angeles that showcased her Spring 2024 collection; the boutique’s façade, interior, and some of the fashions featured animal portraits by German photographer Walter Schels.

In 2024, the company was included on Time's list of the 100 Most Influential Companies, and Burch was one of Time magazine's 100 most influential people in the world.

In 2024, the brand introduced Sublime, a new fragrance with a launch campaign featuring Kendall Jenner.

Tory collaborated with artist Rashid Johnson on bespoke pieces for the Met Gala in May 2025.

=== Tory Sport ===
In September 2015, Burch also introduced Tory Sport, a separate performance activewear line, on a dedicated website, and in a pop-up shop on Elizabeth Street in Manhattan in the space where she had launched her brand's first boutique in 2004. A stand-alone store on Fifth Avenue in New York, as well as boutiques in East Hampton and Dallas, were opened in 2016. As of late 2017 Tory Sport has stores in several cities around the U.S. and an in-store boutique at the Tory Burch store in Hong Kong. The collection includes designs for running, studio, tennis, swimming, and golf, as well as clothes for before and after a workout. Both the Tory Burch line and the Tory Burch Sport line support the Tory Burch Foundation, which empowers women entrepreneurs by providing access to capital, business education, networking, and a fellows program.

== Management ==
Pierre-Yves Roussel joined the company as CEO in 2019. In November 2020, Tory Burch LLC named Thibault Villet president of the Asia-Pacific region, effective on December 28, 2020. In his new position, Villet will manage all facets of the brand’s activities.

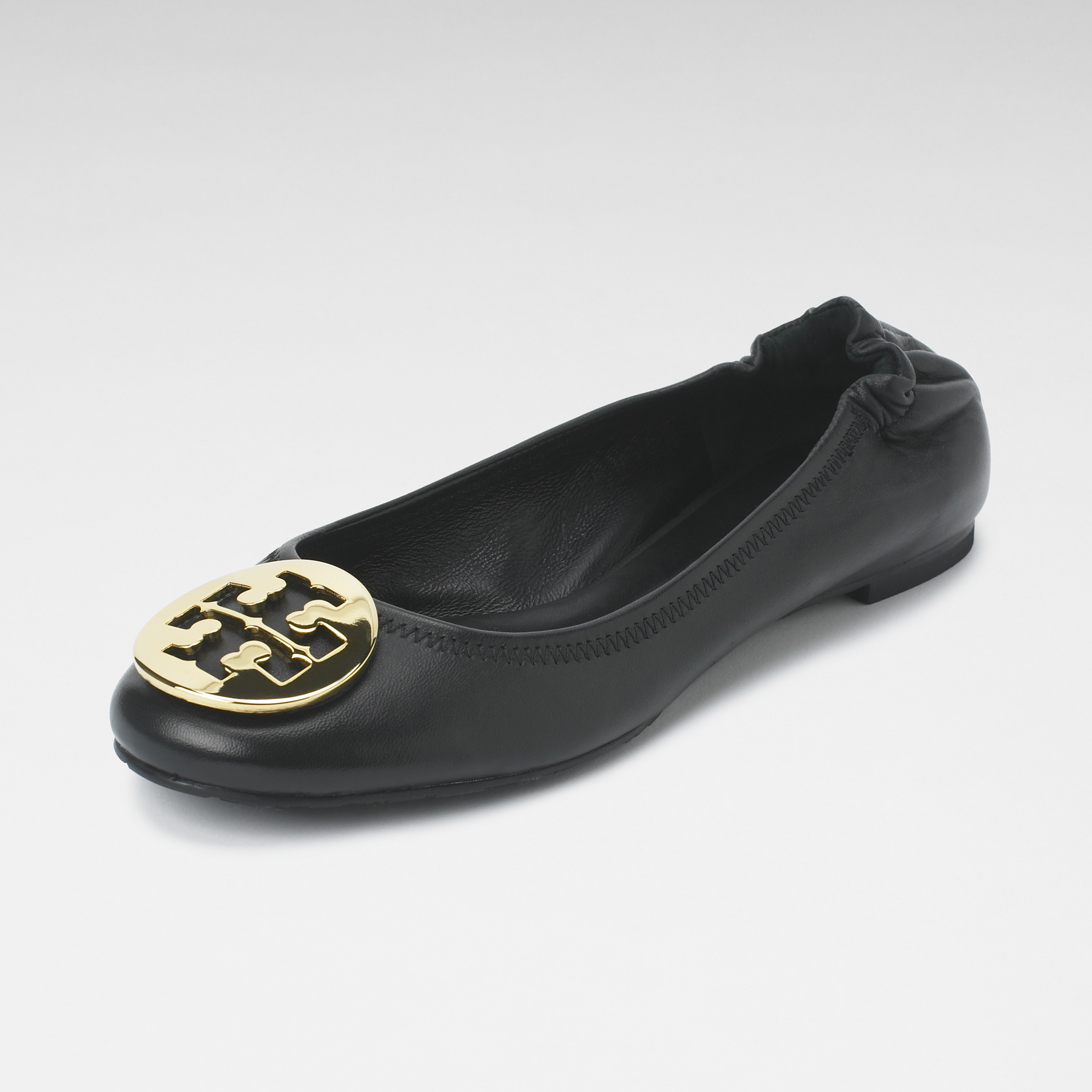
A REVA ballet flat designed by Burch

== Design style ==
Burch's style has been described as preppy-boho and preppy-bohemian luxe, and is associated with her T-logo medallion. Known for being easy to wear and versatile, Tory Burch styles are popular with women of all ages, including the viewers and fans of the television show Gossip Girl, where they were often featured. In 2007, there were wait lists to buy Tory Burch fashions, which are known for color and print and often pay homage to styles of the 1960s and 1970s. Burch named her line of Reva ballerina flats after her mother.

In the 2020s, after Burch relinquished her CEO role to focus almost exclusively on designing, the aesthetic has evolved in what she calls a "creative reinvention" of the brand.

== Awards ==
- 2005 Rising Star Award for Best New Retail Concept, Fashion Group International
- 2007 Accessory Brand Launch of the Year, Accessories Council Excellence Awards
- 2008 Accessories Designer of the Year, Council of Fashion Designers of America
- 2023 Designer of the Year, Harper's Bazaar
- 2024 100 Most Influential Companies, Time magazine
