= Carol Lim =

American fashion designer

- Born: February 20, 1975 (age 51); Los Angeles, California, U.S
- Label: Opening Ceremony
- Spouse: Matthew Killip
- Children: 2

Carol Lim (born February 20, 1975) is an American fashion designer, retailer and creative director, who works in partnership with Humberto Leon.

She founded the fashion retailer Opening Ceremony in 2002 in Lower Manhattan. Further stores followed in New York City, then Los Angeles and Tokyo. A store opened in 2012 in London, coinciding with the Olympics.

In 2011, Lim was announced as creative director of the French high fashion brand Kenzo, which was founded in 1970 and is part of the LVMH luxury goods conglomerate. In 2019, Lim and Leon exited Kenzo to focus on Opening Ceremony.

== Early life ==
Carol Lim is the daughter of Korean parents, born and raised in the Los Angeles suburbs. After graduating with a degree in economics in 1997, Lim worked in the corporate sphere, including a stint with Deloitte, before moving to New York and becoming a merchandise planner for Bally.

== Career ==
At age 25, Lim went on a trip to Hong Kong, where she was inspired to open a store. Its concept was to bring brands such as Havaianas and Topshop to the United States and to feature then-emerging American fashion brands such as Proenza Schouler, Alexander Wang, and Rodarte. She went to the New York State Small Business Development Center at SUNY for assistance in refining their business plan and obtaining a business loan, and each contributed $10,000 of their own money towards Opening Ceremony.

Opening Ceremony features a rotating assortment of brands from different designers and is known for its collaborations with brands and personalities such as Pendleton, Levi's, Timberland, Keds, Robert Clergerie, Chloë Sevigny, and Spike Jonze. The stores also feature Opening Ceremony's eponymous brand.

In July 2011, Kenzo parent company LVMH announced the appointment of Lim as co-creative director of the brand. Lim debuted her collection in 2012: It was inspired by upstate New York and the painter Ellsworth Kelly.

Lim is a member of the Council of Fashion Designers of America and an advisor at Parsons School of Design in Manhattan.

== Personal life ==
Lim is married to British filmmaker Matthew Killip; the couple has two daughters.

== See also ==
- Koreans in New York City
