= Humberto Leon =

American fashion designer (born 1975)

- Born: June 7, 1975 (age 51); Los Angeles, California
- Education: University of California, Berkeley
- Label: Opening Ceremony
- Children: 2

Humberto Leon (born June 7, 1975) is an American fashion designer and retailer who works with Carol Lim. He is the creative director for the pop group Katseye.

Leon and Lim founded the fashion retailer Opening Ceremony in 2002 in Lower Manhattan. In 2011, they became creative directors of Kenzo, part of LVMH; they departed in July 2019.

== Early life and education ==
Leon was born in suburban Los Angeles to a Peruvian father and a Chinese mother who worked as a seamstress. He was the youngest in the family. He attended UC Berkeley, where he met Carol Lim.

== Career ==
=== Early career ===
After college, Leon was a design director at Gap and worked at Burberry during Rose Marie Bravo's tenure.

=== Opening ceremony ===
In early 2001, Leon and Lim took a two-week trip to Hong Kong that inspired them to open a store in the United States. The concept was to bring international brands like Havaianas and Topshop to the U.S. while featuring emerging American designers like Proenza Schouler, Alexander Wang, and Rodarte. After considering names like Airport and Terminal, they settled on Opening Ceremony. They worked with the New York State Small Business Development Center at SUNY on their business plan and loan, and each contributed $10,000. The first store opened in New York; others followed in Los Angeles and Tokyo. A London store opened in 2012 to coincide with the Olympics.

=== Kenzo ===
In July 2011, LVMH appointed Leon and Lim as co-creative directors of Kenzo. Their debut collection, shown in 2012, was inspired by upstate New York and the painter Ellsworth Kelly. The label had been in decline since Kenzo Takada's departure in 1999; Leon and Lim are credited with reviving it. They departed in June 2019 to focus on Opening Ceremony.

== Other roles ==
Leon was a member of the Council of Fashion Designers of America and an advisor to Parsons School of Design. In 2026, he became the creative director of St. John.

== Personal life ==
Leon has twin daughters.

== See also ==
- Chinese people in New York City
- LGBT culture in New York City
- List of LGBT people from New York City
- NYC Pride March
