= December 1974 =

Month of 1974

<<	December 1974					>>
Su	Mo	Tu	We	Th	Fr	Sa
1	2	3	4	5	6	7
8	9	10	11	12	13	14
15	16	17	18	19	20	21
22	23	24	25	26	27	28
29	30	31

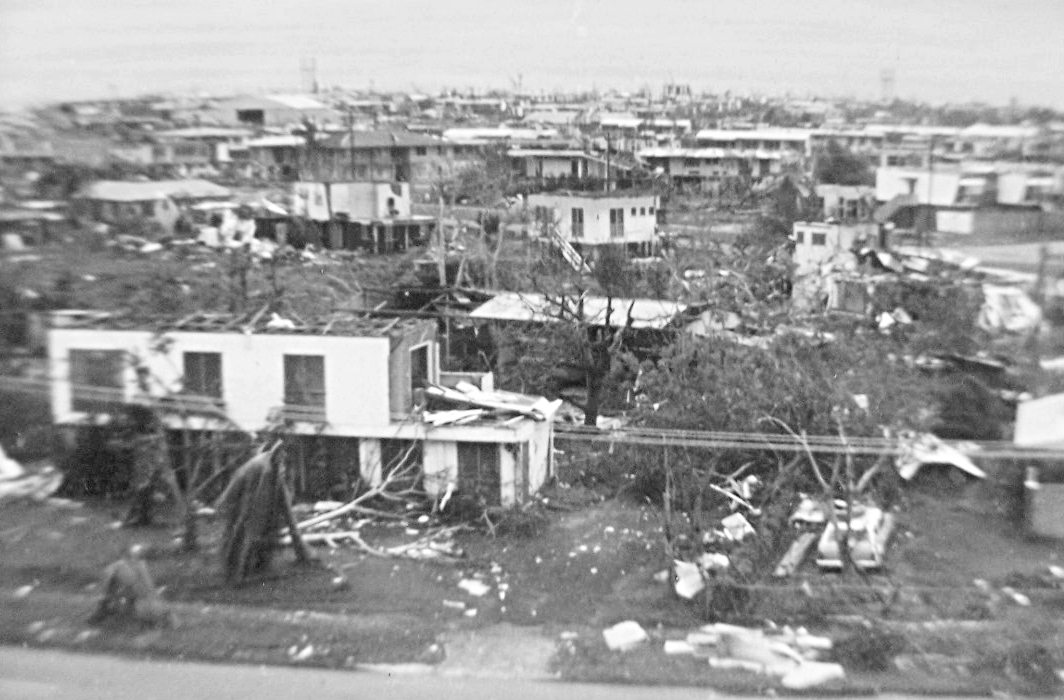
December 25, 1974: Cyclone Tracy destroys most of Darwin in Australia

The following events occurred in December 1974:

== December 1, 1974 (Sunday) ==
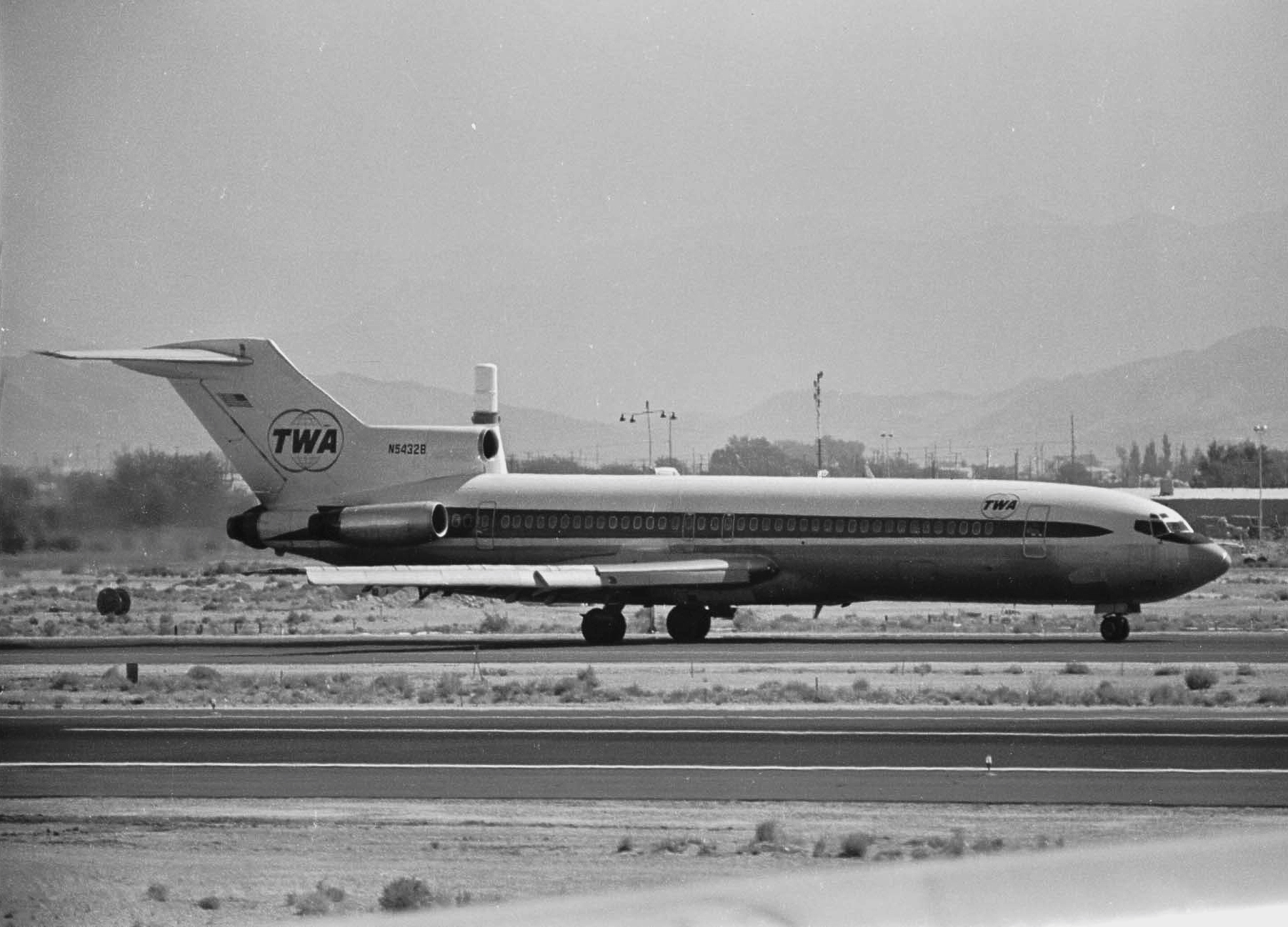
The TWA Flight 514 accident aircraft

- All 92 people aboard TWA Flight 514 were killed when the Boeing 727 flew into the west side of Mount Weather, near Upperville, Virginia. The jet had departed from Columbus, Ohio and was approaching Dulles International Airport at Washington, D.C., in bad weather.
- Later on the same day, Northwest Orient Airlines Flight 6231, another Boeing 727, crashed after taking off from New York City toward Buffalo, New York. The aircraft went down a few minutes later in New York's Harriman State Park, killing the only occupants, its three crew members. The jet had been chartered to pick up the NFL's Baltimore Colts, who had lost a game to the Buffalo Bills and were preparing to return to Baltimore.
- A crisis over the funeral arrangements of former UN Secretary General U Thant began in Rangoon (now Yangon), after thousands of people were outraged at the lack of respect shown by the military government when U Thant's body arrived at Mingaladon Airport without being received by an honor guard or government representatives. The anger was further compounded by the decision to bury U Thant, without a state funeral, at Kyandaw Cemetery, and led to protests by thousands of students.
- Jacqueline Hansen broke the world record for endurance as she won the Western Hemisphere Marathon in Culver City, California, in 2 hours, 43 minutes and 54 seconds. Hansen's time was two-and-a-half minutes faster than the previous record of 2:46:24, set by Chantal Langlacé on October 27.
- Near Abilene, Texas, six employees of Gulf Refining Company died when they were overcome by methane fumes in a trench while attempting to repair a pipeline leak.
- Died:

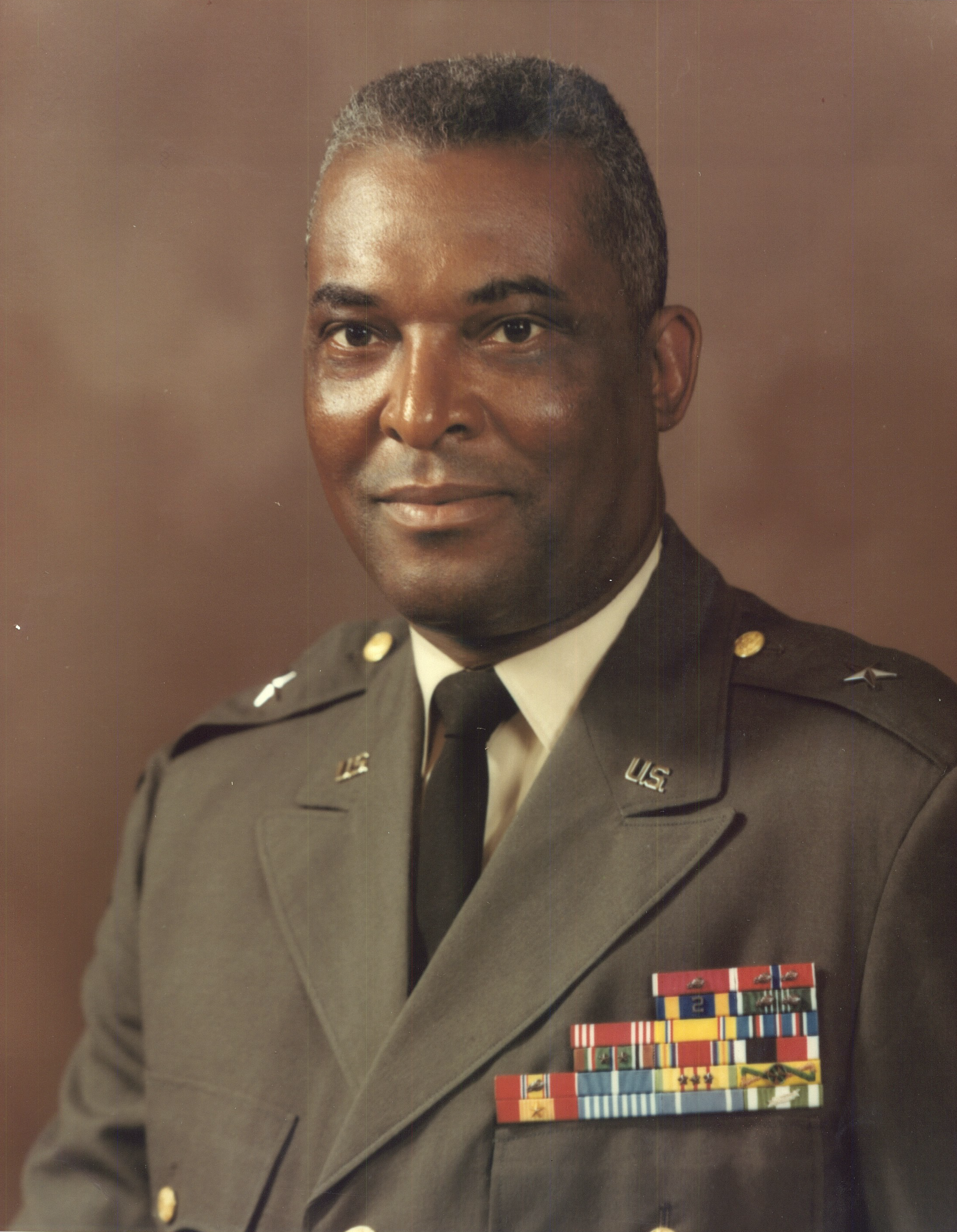
Cartwright

  - U.S. Army Brigadier General Roscoe "Rock" Cartwright, 55, U.S. military officer and only the second African-American to rise to the rank of a general in the United States Army, was killed with his wife Gloria in the crash of TWA Flight 514.
  - Teng Daiyuan, 70, Chinese military leader and Chinese Communist Party politician. Teng, a former Minister of Railways in the People's Republic of China, had fallen into disfavor during China's Cultural Revolution.
  - Sucheta Kripalani, 66, Indian freedom fighter and politician, died of a heart attack.
  - Anita Brenner (born Hanna Brenner), 69, transnational Jewish scholar and author specializing in Mexican history and culture, died in a traffic collision.
  - G. Gould Lincoln, 94, American political reporter, recipient of the Presidential Medal of Freedom
  - Lajos Zilahy, 83, Hungarian novelist and playwright

== December 2, 1974 (Monday) ==
- In Ethiopia, Eritrean nationalists bombed the Addis Ababa city hall and the Webi Shebeli Hotel. The ruling Derg revolutionary council used the bombings as a pretext for hardened repression against former members of the regime of Emperor Haile Selassie.
- The Soviet Union launched the Soyuz 16 spacecraft, carrying cosmonauts Anatoly Filipchenko and Nikolai Rukavishnikov, into orbit in order to test systems for the Apollo–Soyuz flight scheduled for July 1975.
- In the wake of the Watergate scandal and the resignation of former U.S. President Richard Nixon, Whittier College, Nixon's alma mater, agreed to accept and administer the assets of the Richard M. Nixon Foundation, which would disband, with plans to build Nixon's presidential library put on hold. Nixon would found a new Richard Nixon Foundation in 1983, and the Richard Nixon Presidential Library and Museum in Yorba Linda, California, would open in 1990.
- Died:
  - Stephen Gill Spottswood, 77, American civil rights leader, NAACP chair and retired bishop of the African Methodist Episcopal Zion Church, died of cancer.
  - Lucio Cabañas, 35, Mexican schoolteacher and union and guerrilla leader, killed himself to avoid capture and likely execution by the Mexican military.
  - Sidney Jourard, 48, Canadian psychologist, professor and writer, was crushed to death when his car fell on him while he was working on it.
  - Sylvi Kekkonen, 74, First Lady of Finland and wife of President Uhro Kekkonen, died of a heart attack.
  - Hana Benešová (born Anna Vlčková), 89, widow of former president of Czechoslovakia Edvard Beneš, died of pneumonia. On December 7, several thousand people would attend Benešová's funeral, although the Czechoslovak press gave no advance notice of the service.
  - Paul Coze (born Paul Jean Coze-Dabija), 71, French-American artist and writer
  - Paul B. Dague, 76, former member of the United States House of Representatives from Pennsylvania
  - British commercial diver David Keane, 27, drowned when his umbilical cable was cut through while he was conducting a bell dive in the Celtic Sea.

== December 3, 1974 (Tuesday) ==
- The Pioneer 11 interplanetary probe flew past the planet Jupiter, coming within 42,828 kilometres (26,612 mi) of the planet's atmosphere, and took the closest photographs up to that time of the Great Red Spot.
- Born:
  - Mónika Sánchez, Mexican soap opera actress known for Laberintos de pasión; in Mexico City
  - Natalie J. Robb, Scottish soap opera actress known for Emmerdale; in Bellshill, North Lanarkshire
- Died:
  - Władysław Bukowiński, 69, Polish Roman Catholic priest and blessed
  - Fernando Gerassi, 75, Turkish-born American artist
  - Helen Appleton Read, 87, American critic and art historian
  - Cy Twombly, 77, American Major League Baseball pitcher and athletic director of Washington and Lee University, father of American artist Cy Twombly
  - Vincent Stanislaus Waters, 70, American Roman Catholic prelate, bishop of the Roman Catholic Diocese of Raleigh, died of a heart attack.

== December 4, 1974 (Wednesday) ==
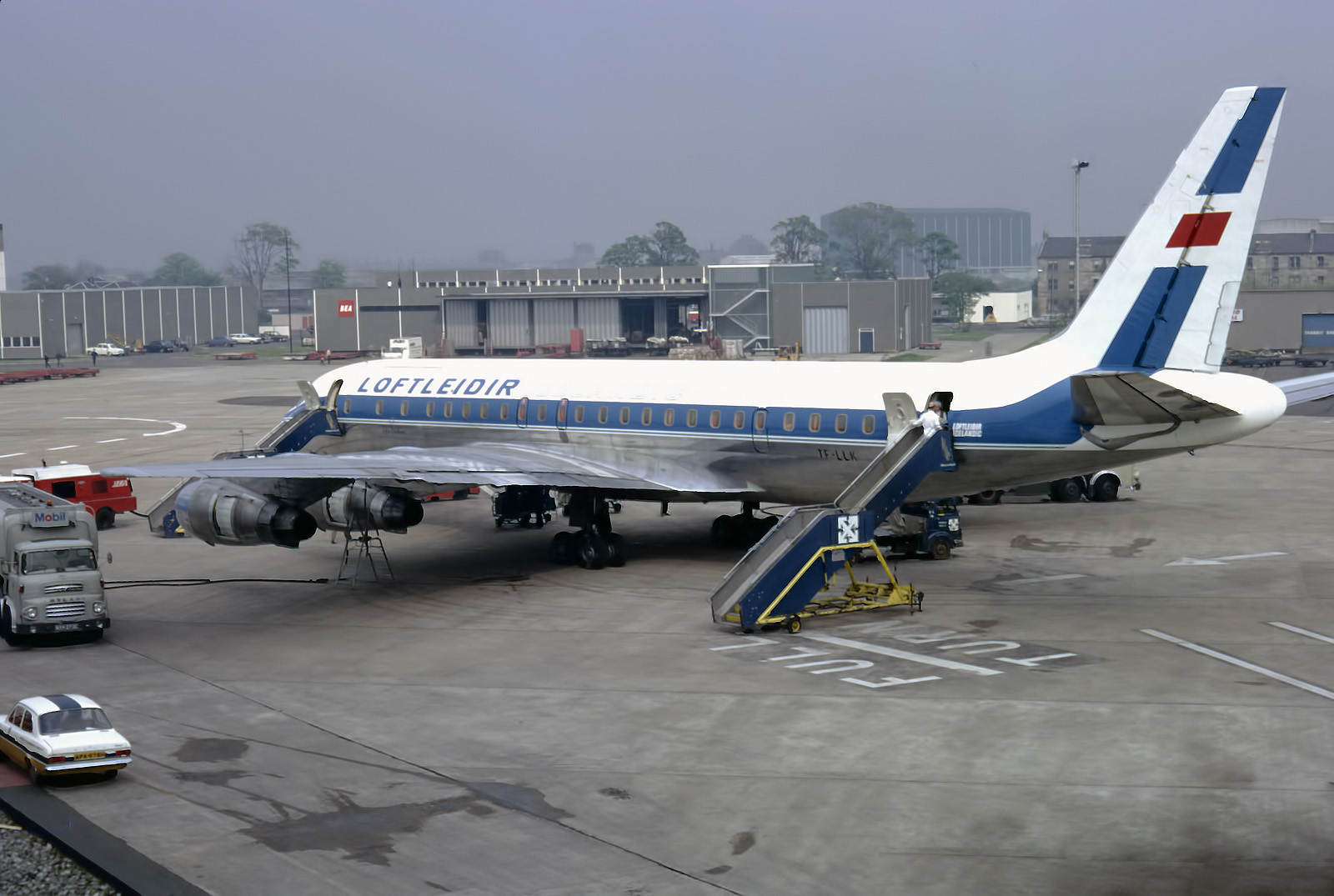
The DC-8 crashed in Flight 138 while still in service with a previous operator

- Martinair Flight 138 crashed in Sri Lanka, killing all 191 people aboard. Carrying Muslim pilgrims who were making the hajj to Mecca, the Douglas DC-8 was approaching Colombo on an intermediate stop on its flight to Jeddah in Saudi Arabia, and was cleared to descend to an altitude of 2,000 feet (610 m) after reporting its position incorrectly. The aircraft then impacted at Anjimalai Mountain, one of the peaks of the Saptha Kanya range, at 4,355 feet (1,327 m).
- On the same day at Irkutsk in the Soviet Union, all 13 people aboard an Aeroflot An-2R airplane died in a midair collision. The plane was departing on a scheduled flight to Kazachinskoye, after being cleared for takeoff into the path of an Antonov An-12 flight cleared for landing on the same runway. The two airplanes collided at 890 feet (270 m). The crew of the An-12 were able to make an emergency landing with no fatalities.
- French existentialist author Jean-Paul Sartre visited the prison cell of West German terrorist Andreas Baader, of the Baader-Meinhof gang, in Stuttgart for an interview.
- A fire aboard a Ringling Bros. and Barnum & Bailey Circus train in South Carolina killed 4 circus employees.
- Born: Anke Huber, German professional tennis player; in Bruchsal, West Germany
- Died:
  - Leo Goossen, 82, American mechanical engineer and automobile designer, died after a stroke.
  - Lee Kinsolving, 36, American actor, died of a respiratory illness.
  - Henry Francke Jr., 17, a linebacker on the Riverhead High School football team on Long Island, died eight weeks after breaking his neck during an intrasquad scrimmage.

== December 5, 1974 (Thursday) ==
- The collapse of a snow-laden roof killed 25 people at an airport terminal in Tehran. Authorities clubbed news photographers who would not stop taking pictures of the scene.
- The Birmingham Americans won the first and only World Bowl, the championship game of the World Football League, defeating the Florida Blazers by a score of 22–21.
- The women's basketball team of the University of Connecticut, which would go on to win eleven NCAA championships in 22 seasons from 1995 to 2016, played its very first game, a 40 to 27 win over visiting Eastern Connecticut State University.
- Died:
  - Pietro Germi, 60, Italian actor and neo-realist comedy director (Divorce Italian Style), died of hepatitis.
  - Millicent Hearst (born Millicent Willson), 92, widow of William Randolph Hearst
  - Zaharia Stancu, 72, Romanian author and philosopher
  - Henry Wadsworth, 71, American stage and film actor
  - Richard Whitney, 86, American financier, former president of the New York Stock Exchange and convicted embezzler
  - Hazel Hotchkiss Wightman, CBE, 87, American Olympic champion tennis player

== December 6, 1974 (Friday) ==
- The steady decline of prices on the New York Stock Exchange reached its lowest point, closing at 577.60 points, its lowest level since October 26, 1962. The nadir came after prices dropped more than 45% over two years since the NYSE's high point of 1,003.16 on November 4, 1972.
- Died:
  - Admiral Nikolai Kuznetsov, 70, Soviet naval officer who had commanded the Soviet Navy during World War II and was later the first officer to reach the rank of Admiral of the Fleet of the Soviet Union, in 1955.
  - Robert Bartini, 77, Hungarian-born Soviet aircraft designer

== December 7, 1974 (Saturday) ==
- The Randolph–Sheppard Act, a United States law titled "Vending facilities for blind in Federal buildings", took effect. With a stated goal of "providing blind persons with remunerative employment, enlarging the economic opportunities of the blind, and stimulating the blind to greater efforts in striving to make themselves self-supporting", the new law required that blind persons should be given priority in licenses to operate vending facilities on federal property. Vending facilities were defined as automatic vending machines, cafeterias, snack bars, cart services, shelters, and counters.
- In the 1974 Grantland Rice Bowl, played at Tiger Stadium in Baton Rouge, Louisiana, the Delaware Fightin' Blue Hens defeated the previously unbeaten UNLV Rebels by a score of 49–11.
- Born:
  - Nicole Appleton, Canadian-born British singer and member of All Saints; in Hamilton, Ontario
  - Moussa Ibrahim, former Minister of Information of Libya and spokesman for Muammar Gaddafi; in Sirte

== December 8, 1974 (Sunday) ==
- Voters in Greece overwhelmingly approved the end of the monarchy and endorsed maintaining the government as a presidential republic, with almost 70 percent in favor.
- The paramilitary Irish National Liberation Army and its political wing, the left-wing Irish Republican Socialist Party, with a stated goal of removing Northern Ireland from the United Kingdom of Great Britain and Northern Ireland and uniting with the Republic of Ireland to create a socialist republic, were founded at the Spa Hotel in Lucan, Ireland by Seamus Costello and others.
- The Soyuz 16 spaceflight returned to Earth after a successful test by Soviet cosmonauts of the docking ring and other mechanisms needed to safely connect with a U.S. spacecraft for the 1975 Apollo–Soyuz mission.
- The Italian musical Aggiungi un posto a tavola (Add a seat at the table) premiered in Rome.
- Died:
  - Ali Mansur, 88, former prime minister of Iran 1940-1941 and 1950
  - Robert Duffy, 71, American college football coach and lawyer
  - Hugues Panassié, 62, French jazz critic, record producer and impresario, died of a heart attack.

== December 9, 1974 (Monday) ==
- Takeo Miki formed a government as the new prime minister of Japan, after Kakuei Tanaka had announced his resignation on November 26.
- The national government of Mexico published its declaration that the identification of the alcoholic beverage of tequila was limited to the blue agave liquor distilled within the Mexican state of Jalisco, and that the term "tequila" (named for the town of Tequila, Jalisco) was the intellectual property of Mexico. The statement was published in the Official Journal of the Federation (Mexico).
- The Ayacucho Declaration was signed in the Peruvian city of Ayacucho by representatives of the South American nations of Argentina, Bolivia, Chile, Colombia, Ecuador, Peru and Venezuela, along with Panama. The eight nations made a statement agreeing to place limits on the acquisition of armaments for military purposes other than defense.
- Leaders of the member nations of the European Communities opened a summit in Paris, and approved plans for the creation of the European Council and the European Regional Development Fund (ERDF). The Paris Summit also approved the direct election of members of the European Parliament by citizens.
- The romantic comedy Alice Doesn't Live Here Anymore, starring Ellen Burstyn in the title role as Alice Hyatt, premiered in Los Angeles before going into release to U.S. theaters on January 29, 1975. It would later be adapted to a TV situation comedy, Alice, with one of the film's cast members, Vic Tayback, reprising his role as Mel Sharples, owner of the diner where Alice worked.
- The first line of the Lyon Metro (current-day Line C, a modernized former funicular line) opened, marking the launch of France's first provincial metro system.
- Born: Pippa Bacca (stage name for Giuseppina Pasqualino di Marineo), Italian performance artist; in Milan (murdered 2008)
- Died:
  - Walter Guyton Cady, 99, American physicist and electrical engineer, died the day before his 100th birthday.
  - Dame Kathleen Courtney, DBE, 96, English suffragist, former United Nations Association chair
  - John Gordon, 84, Scottish newspaper editor (Sunday Express)

== December 10, 1974 (Tuesday) ==
- United Nations General Assembly Resolution 3275 was approved by the UNGA, designating 1975 as International Women's Year.
- The United Mine Workers of America (UMWA) ended its nationwide walkout of bituminous coal miners after 28 days. The strike had started on November 12 and was concluded after a three-year agreement with unionized coal companies on wages, health and safety, and work rules.
- The Helios-A space probe, built in West Germany, was launched from Cape Canaveral in the U.S. in order to orbit the Sun and gather data. The Helios-A and Helios-B were part of a joint operation of the German Aerospace Center (which provided 70% of the funding) and NASA, which provided the launch.
- In the Mexico City area, thousands of parents stormed schools and removed their children due to rumors that people disguised as inoculation teams were giving children sterilization shots. The following day, authorities suspended all vaccination drives and posted police outside schools.
- U.S. Representative Wilbur Mills resigned as Chairman of the powerful House Ways and Means Committee (which controls the speed of passage of legislation to a vote) after being cited for public intoxication for a second time while with his mistress, Fanne Foxe.
- Born: Manuel Alejandro Aponte Gómez, alias "El Bravo", Mexican drug trafficker and hitman for the Sinaloa Cartel; in Chilpancingo, Guerrero state (killed 2014)
- Died:
  - Dave Crowley, 64, former British champion lightweight boxer
  - Manuel Komroff, 84, American author and editor
  - Paul Richards (born Paul Richard Levitt), 50, American actor known for the TV series Breaking Point, died of cancer.

== December 11, 1974 (Wednesday) ==
- A temporary ceasefire was agreed to between the white-minority government of the southern African nation of Rhodesia and guerrillas of the ZANU and ZAPU, after being brokered by South Africa and Zambia. The peace, which lasted eight months, allowed the all-black Zimbabwe African National Liberation Army (ZANLA) and the Zimbabwe People's Revolutionary Army (ZIPRA) guerrillas to regroup after the all-white Rhodesian Light Infantry had succeeded in disrupting the nationalists. ZANLA and ZIPRA would eventually triumph in bringing majority rule by the black majority, and the transformation of Rhodesia into the Republic of Zimbabwe.
- Born: Rey Mysterio (ring name for Óscar Gutiérrez Rubio), American professional wrestler; in Chula Vista, California
- Died:
  - André Géraud, 92, French journalist and animal rights advocate who wrote under the pen name "Pertinax"
  - Walter H. Wheeler Jr., 77, American businessman who led the growth of Pitney-Bowes, the manufacturer of the most-used postage meter in the world
  - Reed Hadley (stage name for Reed Herring), 63, American film, television and radio actor known for the Red Ryder radio series and the TV series Racket Squad, died of a heart attack.
  - Emile John Lussier, 79, American flying ace with 11 victories in World War I while flying with Britain's Royal Air Force
  - L. E. Katterfeld, 93, German-born American Communist who co-founded the Communist Labor Party of America after also serving as an official in the Socialist Party of America, the Communist Party of America and the Workers Party of America

== December 12, 1974 (Thursday) ==
- The epic crime film The Godfather Part II, director Francis Ford Coppola's sequel to his 1972 film The Godfather, received its premiere in New York City. It would go into release throughout the United States on December 20.

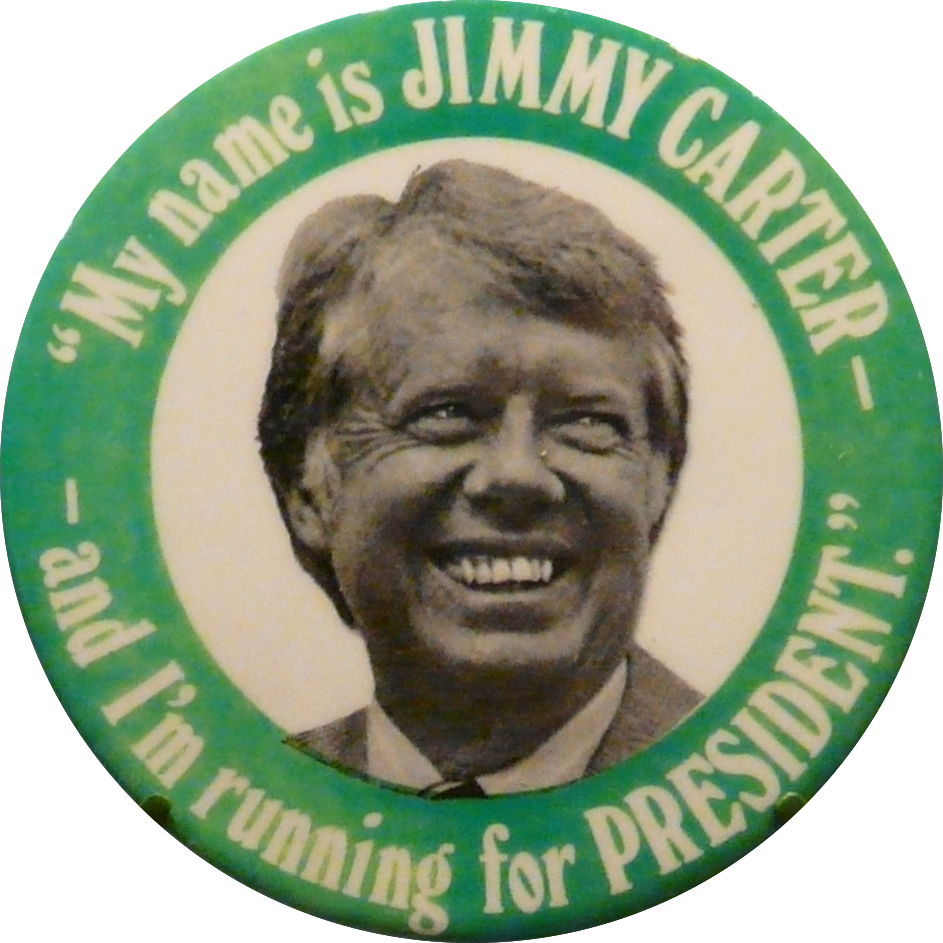
Jimmy Carter campaign button

- At the Atlanta Civic Center, 50-year-old Jimmy Carter, the Governor of Georgia, announced his candidacy for the Democratic nomination in the 1976 United States presidential election.
- Died:
  - Karl Arnstein, 87, Bohemian-born American airship engineer, designer of the airships USS Akron (ZRS-4) and USS Macon (ZRS-5)
  - Sir Edward Maufe, RA, FRIBA, 92, English architect known for designing Guildford Cathedral

== December 13, 1974 (Friday) ==
- North Vietnam launched the Spring Offensive, fighting against the South Vietnamese Army in the Battle of Phước Long. Within less than five months, South Vietnam would be conquered by the Communist North Vietnamese.

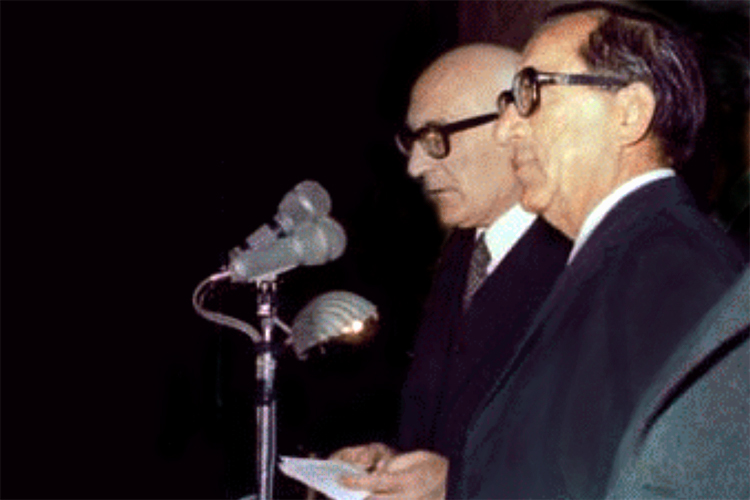
President Anthony Mamo and Prime Minister Dom Mintoff proclaiming the Republic of Malta

- The island of Malta, formerly a British dominion in the Mediterranean Sea, became a republic as a new constitution was adopted. Sir Anthony Mamo, who had been the British Governor General of Malta since 1971, became the first President and continued as head of state, while Prime Minister Dom Mintoff continued in his role as the head of government.
- The 11,151-ton freighter Sacramento Venture sank 1,100 miles (1,800 km) east of Japan. A Japanese tugboat rescued all 35 crewmembers.
- A partial solar eclipse was visible from the United States but was obscured by clouds in the most heavily populated areas.
- Seven people, including a probationary firefighter, were killed in an arson fire at London's Worsley Hotel.
- Died:
  - Robert Bennett, 55, American Olympic hammer thrower
  - Rufe Davis, 66, American stage, film and television actor (Petticoat Junction)
  - Henry de Monfreid, 95, French adventurer and author
  - Betty Van Patter, 45, a white bookkeeper for the Black Panther Party, disappeared on this date. Her body would be found in San Francisco Bay in January 1975 with a fractured skull.

== December 14, 1974 (Saturday) ==
- Private Teruo Nakamura, a Taiwanese-born member of the Imperial Japanese Army, became the last combatant from World War II to surrender, more than 29 years after the end of the War. Nakamura had been stationed on Morotai, at the time an island in the Dutch East Indies (now Indonesia), when U.S., Australian and Netherlands forces recaptured the island in the Battle of Morotai. Initially part of a group of soldiers determined not to surrender, Nakamura evaded capture until a pilot accidentally spotted his hut, prompting a search by the Indonesian Army and his arrest.
- In Seoul, 40 legislators were involved in a brawl that broke out on the floor of the National Assembly of South Korea after former Foreign Minister Chung Il-hyung called on President Park Chung Hee to resign, calling his regime an "Orwellian type of total dictatorship."
- United Nations General Assembly Resolution 3314 was adopted as a non-binding recommendation to the Security Council on the definition for the "crime of aggression" for an individual nation.
- Died:
  - Walter Lippmann, 85, American journalist, political commentator and newspaper columnist, winner of two Pulitzer Prizes and the Presidential Medal of Freedom, died of a heart ailment. U.S. President Ford issued a statement declaring that, "With the death of Walter Lippmann, we have lost a great American. As a newsman, political analyst, and author, Walter Lippmann played a major role for more than half a century in the development of public dialog and in shaping a new standard of journalism. Mr. Lippmann's contributions to the good society which he envisioned for his country will long be remembered."
  - Alexander Burns Wallace CBE FRSE FRCSE, 68, British plastic surgeon and medical journal editor known for his 1951 creation of the "Rule of Nines" in measuring the percentage of skin surface area caused by burns.
  - Kurt Hahn CBE, 88, German educator, founder of Gordonstoun
  - Bob Herwig, 60, American college football center and inductee to the College Football Hall of Fame, died of a heart attack.
  - Hugo Rogers, 75, American politician, leader of Tammany Hall from 1948 to 1949, died of a heart attack.
  - American backpacker Charles Dean, 24, and Australian backpacker Neil Sharman, 23, were executed by Pathet Lao guerrillas in Laos. Dean was the brother of future U.S. politician Howard Dean.
  - Joanne Stefani Germanotta, 19, the subject of many of the works of singer Lady Gaga (stage name for Stefani Joanne Germanotta) and namesake for Gaga's popular album Joanne, died of complications from lupus.
  - Fritz Szepan, 67, German footballer who played 34 games as a forward for the Germany national football team from 1929 to 1939
  - John M. Comley, 79, former justice of the Connecticut Supreme Court
  - Fulton Freeman, 59, former United States Ambassador to Mexico and Colombia, died of a heart attack.

== December 15, 1974 (Sunday) ==
- The first FM radio station in Australia, 2MBS of Sydney, began broadcasting.
- General Phaedon Gizikis, President of Greece since being appointed by the ruling military junta on November 25, 1973, announced his resignation, pending the election of a provisional president by the new Hellenic Parliament.
- Eighteen people died in a fire at a nursing home in Nottingham, England.
- U.S. Army General Alexander Haig succeeded General Andrew Goodpaster as Supreme Allied Commander Europe, overseeing NATO forces in Europe.
- Born: P. J. Byrne, American actor; in Maplewood, New Jersey
- Died:
  - Anatole Litvak, 72, Ukrainian-born American filmmaker known for directing The Snake Pit, Anastasia, and Sorry, Wrong Number
  - Karin Branzell, 83, Swedish opera mezzo-soprano with New York's Metropolitan Opera, died of an embolism while recovering from a pelvic fracture.
  - Harry Hershfield, 89, American humorist, newspaper columnist and radio personality, and the writer of the comic strip Abie the Agent

== December 16, 1974 (Monday) ==
- In central Africa, the army of the Republic of Mali invaded the Republic of Upper Volta (now Burkina Faso) in a border conflict over water rights that would last until 1985.
- The United States Senate unanimously (93 to 0) ratified the Geneva Protocol, officially the "Protocol for the Prohibition of the Use in War of Asphyxiating, Poisonous or other Gases, and of Bacteriological Methods of Warfare", almost 50 years after it had first been signed. U.S. President Ford signed the ratification on January 22, 1975. The agreement had been signed in Switzerland on June 17, 1925, and became effective on February 28, 1928.
- The Safe Drinking Water Act was signed into law, setting standards for drinking water quality for all public water systems in the United States.
- ANZUK, a military unit created in 1971 by agreement of Australia, New Zealand and the United Kingdom, was disbanded after slightly more than two years.
- In the 1974 Liberty Bowl, played at Memphis Memorial Stadium in Memphis, Tennessee, the Tennessee Volunteers defeated the Maryland Terrapins by a score of 7–3.
- The American disaster film The Towering Inferno, directed by John Guillermin and produced by Irwin Allen, received its world premiere in Los Angeles.
- Died:
  - R. F. C. Hull, 61, British translator of The Collected Works of C. G. Jung
  - Edward A. Pierce, 100, American businessman and stockbroker

== December 17, 1974 (Tuesday) ==
- The World Intellectual Property Organization (WIPO) became a specialized agency of the United Nations.
- United Nations Security Council Resolution 366, terminating South Africa's mandate over Namibia (at the time, South-West Africa), was approved by a unanimous vote. South Africa ignored the resolution and continued its control over the former German colony.
- General Augusto Pinochet, the de facto head of state of the Republic of Chile as chairman of the ruling Chilean military junta since the coup d'etat of September 11, 1973, was formally appointed as President of the Republic and commander of the Chilean Army by the junta's Decree-Law Number 806. Pinochet had previously been designated the nation's "Supreme Chief" ("Jefe Supremo de la Nación") on June 17 by Decree Law No. 527. His appointment would be ratified by the public in a constitutional referendum on the seventh anniversary of the coup, approved on September 11, 1980, and he would continue in office as leader of an oppressive regime until 1990.
- Born:
  - Sarah Paulson, American TV actress, Emmy Award and Golden Globe award winner for The People v. O. J. Simpson: American Crime Story; in Tampa, Florida
  - Giovanni Ribisi and his twin sister Marissa Ribisi, American actors; in Los Angeles
  - Paul Briggs, American film animator for Disney Animation, known for Frozen; in San Antonio, Texas
- Died:
  - Bing Slamet (stage name for Ahmad Syech Albar), 47, popular Indonesian singer and film actor, died of cancer of the liver.
  - Ray Sorensen, 52, American Olympic gymnast and 1948 NCAA champion in all-around competition, was killed in a motorcycle accident.
  - British commercial diver Jeremy L. Howard-Phillips, 30, was sucked into a 20 cm (7.9 in) pipeline valve opening and killed while working from a jet barge at Scapa Flow in the North Sea.

== December 18, 1974 (Wednesday) ==
- Michail Stasinopoulos of the New Democracy Party was elected President of Greece by vote of the Hellenic Parliament, receiving 206 votes from party members, sufficient for the 151 required for a majority.
- The Provisional IRA exploded two time bombs in the English city of Bristol. The first was placed in a sports bag outside a photography studio on Park Street, and a telephone warning followed, bringing police to the scene to clear the area. The second, more powerful bomb had been placed in a trash can 90 feet (27 m) away from the first bomb, with the object of injuring police and other responders lured to the scene. No warning was given for the second blast, and 20 people were injured.
- A U.S. Air Force plane crashed at K. I. Sawyer Air Force Base in Marquette County, Michigan, killing pilot Lt. Robert Petrola and copilot Maj. George Hughey.
- The James Bond film The Man with the Golden Gun, directed by Guy Hamilton and starring Roger Moore as Bond, was released.
- The Symphonie-A communications satellite, conceived and built by a co-operation between the space agencies of France and West Germany, was launched from Cape Canaveral, Florida in the United States at 9:39 in the evening (0239 UTC on 19 December 1974).
- Born:
  - Tom Parker Bowles, British food critic and writer, son of Queen Camilla of the United Kingdom; in Westminster, London
  - Mutassim Gaddafi, son of Muammar Gaddafi and National Security Advisor; in Tripoli (executed 2011)
- Died:
  - Ervin G. Bailey, 93, American mechanical engineer
  - Harry Hooper, 87, American baseball right fielder and inductee to the Baseball Hall of Fame, died of old age.
  - Paul John Knowles, 28, American serial killer who was tied to the deaths of 18 people, and claimed to have murdered 35 victims, was shot to death during an altercation while being transported by the Georgia Bureau of Investigation (GBI) to the scene of one of his crimes. Knowles, though handcuffed, grabbed the weapon of the driver, Henry County Sheriff Earl Lee, firing one shot through the holster, before GBI Agent Ronnie Angel shot Knowles three times.

== December 19, 1974 (Thursday) ==
- The United Kingdom's 1971 "rent freeze", a prohibition against the raising the price of property rentals, was ended by the government of Prime Minister Harold Wilson. The decision came after the London Stock Exchange's FT 30 stock market index had fallen 73% during the year.
- Cearbhall Ó Dálaigh (who used the Anglicized name "Carroll O'Daley" earlier in his career), formerly the Chief Justice of Ireland from 1961 to 1973, was sworn into office as the fifth President of Ireland. He would resign on October 22, 1976, after coming under severe criticism for his delay in implementing the Emergency Powers Bill.
- Former New York Governor Nelson Rockefeller was sworn in as the 41st Vice President of the United States shortly after the U.S. House of Representatives voted, 287 to 128, to approve his nomination to fill the position that had been vacant since U.S. President Gerald Ford had taken office on August 9. The House action followed the 90 to 7 vote by the U.S. Senate on December 10.
- President Ford signed the Presidential Recordings and Materials Preservation Act into law, after the legislation was enacted due to concerns over whether former president Richard Nixon intended to destroy records in his possession.
- The only nuclear power plant in the U.S. state of Arkansas, designated Arkansas Nuclear One, began operations as the first of two reactors began producing energy. Both reactors are located near the town of Russellville.
- Born:
  - Ricky Ponting, Australian international cricketer, four-time winner of the Allan Border Medal and two-time World Cup winning captain, with 168 Test Cricket matches; in Launceston, Tasmania
  - Jasmila Žbanić, Bosnian film director and European Film Award winner in 2021 for Quo Vadis, Aida?; in Sarajevo, SR Bosnia and Herzegovina, Yugoslavia
  - Kwame Nkrumah-Acheampong, Scottish-born Ghanaian skier and the first athlete for the African nation of Ghana to compete (2010) in the Winter Olympics; in Glasgow
- Died:
  - Gunnar Andersson, 51, Swedish aviator, died in a helicopter crash.
  - Catrano Catrani, 64, Italian-born Argentine film director and producer, known for the popular 1958 movie Alto Paraná
  - Ian Fraser, Baron Fraser of Lonsdale, CH, CBE, 77, British peer and politician who advocated for the blind after being blinded in World War I
  - Russell D. Oliver, 64, American sports competitor and coach, died of cancer.

== December 20, 1974 (Friday) ==
- In France, the Veil law, legalizing abortion up to the tenth week of pregnancy, was approved by a vote of 277 in favor and 192 against. The new law took effect on January 17, 1975.
- A truck overturned 8 miles (13 km) from Sterkstroom, South Africa, killing 33 workers and injuring 26.
- Avalanches in Iceland killed 12 people in two separate incidents at the fishing village of Neskaupstaður. At 1:30 in the afternoon, the first avalanche, covering a width of 400 metres (1,300 ft), killed five people, and at 1:50 a second avalanche 140 metres (460 ft) wide struck a garage, a concrete factory and a home, killing seven more, including two children.
- Born:
  - Vasyl Slipak, Ukrainian opera singer and Ukrainian Corps volunteer; in Lviv, Ukrainian SSR, Soviet Union (killed by Russian Army sniper, 2016)
  - S. Jithesh, Indian cartoonist and entertainer known for creating "speed cartooning"; in Pandalam, Kerala state
- Died:
  - R. Palme Dutt, 78, British Marxist, former General Secretary of the Communist Party of Great Britain
  - Ellen Deborah Ellis, 96, American academic, founder and first chair of the political science department at Mount Holyoke College
  - James H. Floyd, 54, member of the Georgia House of Representatives, party to the U.S. Supreme Court case Bond v. Floyd, died of a heart attack.
  - André Jolivet, 69, French composer and conductor
  - Mun Se-gwang, 22, was executed by hanging for the murders of Yuk Young-soo, the First Lady of South Korea, and a high school student during an attempted assassination of President Park Chung Hee on August 15.
  - Ralph M. Parsons, 78, American engineer and industrialist

== December 21, 1974 (Saturday) ==
- An investigative report by Seymour Hersh of The New York Times revealed that the U.S. Central Intelligence Agency had been conducting espionage within the United States against U.S. citizens.
- The number 10 ranked Miami of Ohio Redskins, 10-0-1 in the Mid-American Conference, defeated the Georgia Bulldogs, 21 to 10, to win the Tangerine Bowl in Orlando.
- Born: Karrie Webb, Australian professional golfer; in Ayr, Queensland
- Died:
  - Huberto Alvarado Arellano, 47, Guatemalan Communist and General Secretary of the Partido Guatemalteco del Trabajo (PGT), was executed by the Guatemalan Army the day after being arrested. Two years earlier, his predecessor, Bernardo Alvarado Monzón, had been executed by the government. Alvarado Arellano's mutilated body was found the next day on the outskirts of Guatemala City.
  - Richard Long, 47, American film and TV actor, known for the sitcom Nanny and the Professor, died of a heart attack.
  - Sterling North, 68, American editor and author known for the children's novels Midnight and Jeremiah and Rascal

== December 22, 1974 (Sunday) ==
- Voters on almost all of the Comoros islands approved independence from France, voting 95% in favor. The exception was the island of Mayotte, where 63% of the voters elected to remain an overseas department of France.
- All 75 people aboard Avensa Flight 358 were killed when the McDonnell Douglas DC-9 jet crashed in Venezuela, shortly after taking off from Maturín on a flight to Caracas.
- Died:
  - Irene Mott Bose, 75, American-born social worker active in Nagpur, India
  - Warren Finnerty, 49, American actor, died of a heart attack.
  - Fosco Giachetti, 74, Italian actor and film star during Italy's Fascist era
  - Robert B. Harvey, 66, business manager of Harvey Comic Group, Inc., died of a heart attack.
  - John C. Persons, 86, U.S. Army officer, commanding general of 31st Infantry Division in World War II, died of a stroke.

== December 23, 1974 (Monday) ==
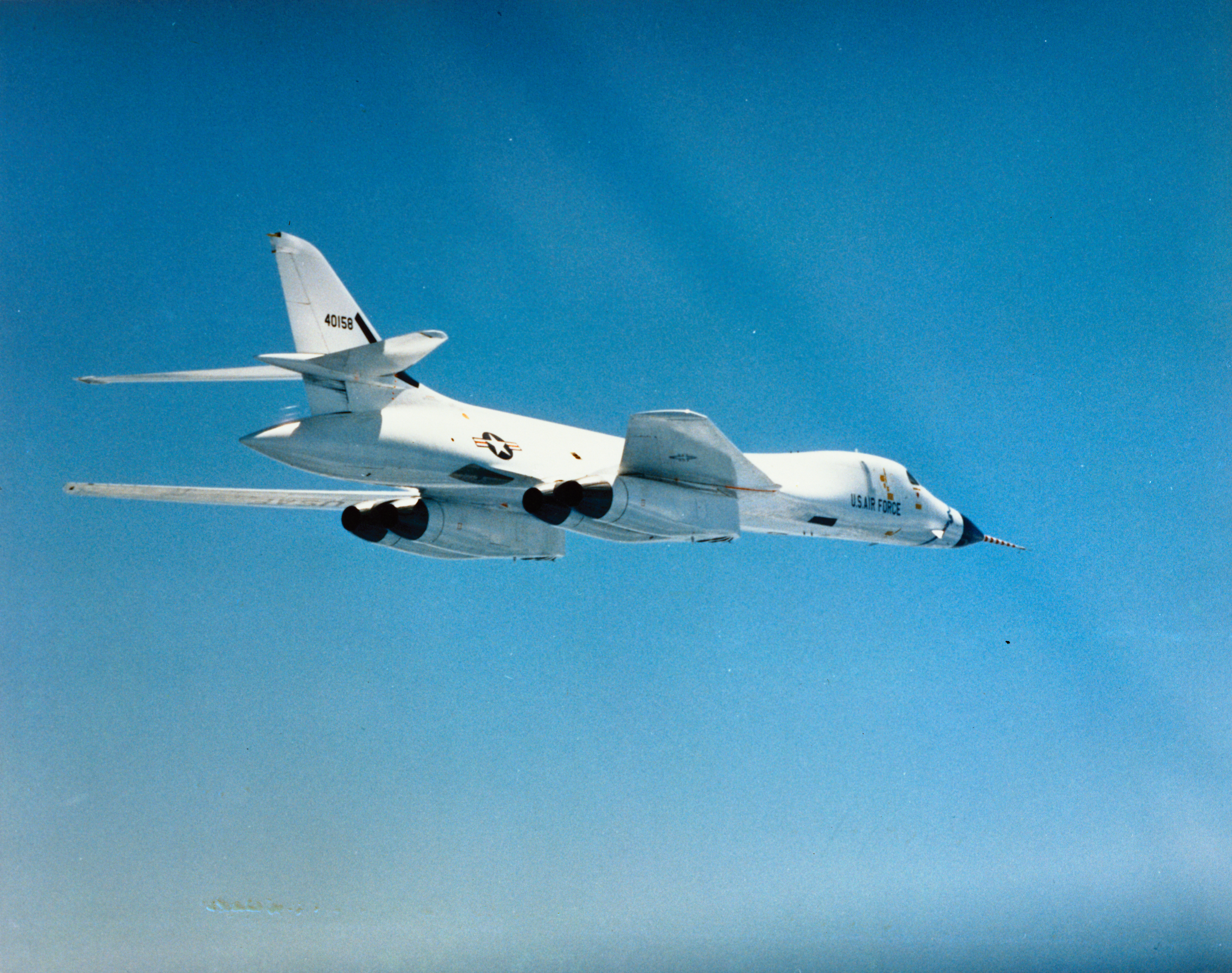
Rockwell B-1A prototype in flight in 1975

- The Rockwell B-1 Lancer intercontinental bomber made its first flight, flown from Palmdale, California, to Edwards Air Force Base by a crew consisting of civilian test pilot Charles C. Bock, Jr. (the aircraft commander), U.S. Air Force pilot Col. Emil Sturmthal, and flight test engineer Richard Abrams.
- In the English Channel, an explosion in the boiler room of the Argentine warship Cándido de Lasala killed 2 sailors and injured 3.
- U.S. President Gerald Ford, in a conversation/interview with Joseph Alsop, declared that a new war in the Middle East and a world crisis were likely to occur in 1975, following the economic breakdown of a "European country, allied to the United States" (the United Kingdom or Italy).
- Three girls from Fort Worth, Texas – Mary Rachel Trlica, Lisa Renee Wilson and Julie Ann Moseley – disappeared during a shopping trip to the Seminary South Shopping Center. They have never been found and no suspects in the disappearance have been identified.
- The NC State Wolfpack and the Houston Cougars played to a 31–31 tie in the 1974 Astro-Bluebonnet Bowl, held at the Astrodome in Houston, Texas.
- Died:
  - Peter A. Quinn, 70, former member of the U.S. House of Representatives from New York and justice of the New York Supreme Court, died of cancer.
  - Elizabeth Julia Reid, 59, Australian journalist and Roman Catholic lay leader in the Grail movement, died of cancer.
  - Jules Rykovich, 51, Croatian-born National Football League player, died of cancer.
  - Karl Brushaber, 37, fell to his death while descending Mount Washington.

== December 24, 1974 (Tuesday) ==
- The city of Darwin in Australia was struck by Cyclone Tracy at 10:00 pm local time. Over the next eight hours, the storm would destroy more than 70% of commercial buildings and 80% of houses, leaving 25,000 of the city's 47,000 residents homeless.
- John Stonehouse, a member of the British House of Commons who had disappeared on November 20 in the United States, was arrested in Australia at Melbourne and charged with 21 individual crimes, including fraud, theft, and forgery, conspiracy to defraud, causing a false police investigation and "wasting police time", a crime in England and Wales. Despite being imprisoned in Australia and later extradited to the UK, he would continue to serve as an MP until resigning in 1976.
- At the Vatican, Pope Paul VI inaugurated the 1975 Jubilee, designating the upcoming year as a Holy Year, in Christmas Eve ceremonies transmitted live to 45 nations. The ceremony of the Pope opening the Holy Door to St. Peter's Basilica, which had been sealed since 1950, "was marred slightly when pieces of masonry from the door fell in front of the Pope," adding that "Several small pieces struck him on the right shoulder and arm, but he pulled back and the mishap did not appear to upset him."
- A second recount of votes in the November 5 Senate election for Senator for the U.S. state of New Hampshire showed that Republican Louis C. Wyman had defeated Democrat John A. Durkin by only 2 votes out of 223,363 that had been cast. Wyman had initially been declared the winner, but a recount led to Durkin having won by 10 votes. The third count, by the New Hampshire State Ballot Law Commission, found the result to be 110,926 for Wyman and 110,924 for Durkin. Neither candidate was sworn in, and the seat would not be filled until a special election on September 16, 1975.
- Born:
  - Ryan Seacrest, American television host, producer and radio personality; in Atlanta
  - Damon Winter, American photographer and Pulitzer Prize winner; in Elmira, New York
- Died: Barbara Blondeau, 36, American photographer, died of breast cancer.

== December 25, 1974 (Wednesday) ==
- In Sofia, the capital of Bulgaria, student Branimir Donchev shot and killed eight people on the fifth floor of a dormitory at Sofia University. Motivated by anger following a rejection by a female student, and further inspired after watching the film The Godfather, Donchev traveled to Dormitory #1 with his father's .380 Walther PP pistol a but was unable to find her. With several magazines of ammunition, he fired 36 shots at various people before being subdued.
- Cyclone Tracy, which struck the city of Darwin the night before and raged through the early morning hours, moved onward by 8:30 a.m. after having killed 66 people, 45 of whom were on land and 21 at sea, and causing US$645 million in damage.
- In the early morning of December 25, 25-year-old model Sandra Zahler was beaten to death in her apartment in Kew Gardens, Queens, New York City, adjacent to the site of the 1964 murder of Kitty Genovese. According to Robert D. McFadden of The New York Times, "[A]t least one neighbor heard her dying screams and did nothing". The murder was not reported until Zahler's body was discovered over 34 hours later.
- Born:
  - Nagma (stage name for Nandita Morarji), Indian film actress known for the 1990 blockbuster Baaghi; in Bombay (now Mumbai)
  - Ed Husain, British author and activist; in London
  - Tamara Bleszynski, Indonesian TV actress and singer; in Bandung, West Java
- Died:
  - Ahmad Ismail Ali, 57, Egyptian Minister of Defense and Commander-in-Chief during the Yom Kippur War, died of cancer.
  - Giacomo Devoto, 77, Italian linguist, author of a celebrated dictionary of the Italian language

== December 26, 1974 (Thursday) ==
- The Soviet space station Salyut 4 was launched into orbit. Two separate crews would stay on the space station, both in 1975, on the Soyuz 17 (29 days by Aleksei Gubarev and Georgy Grechko) and Soyuz 18 (63 days by Pyotr Klimuk and Vitaly Sevastyanov) missions, before the station's de-orbiting on February 2, 1977.
- The Battle of Phuoc Long began as the 4th Corps of the People's Army of Vietnam (PAVN) continued their invasion of South Vietnam, partly with the objective of testing whether the United States would send troops to defend against a Communist invasion. The battle for control of South Vietnam's Phuoc Long province would last for 25 days before the III Corps of the Army of the Republic of Vietnam (ARVN) was forced to retreat.
- Born: Joshua John Miller, American screenwriter and actor; in Los Angeles
- Died:
  - Jack Benny (stage name for Benjamin Kubelsky), 80, American actor and comedian, died of pancreatic cancer.
  - Farid al-Atrash, 64, Syrian-born Egyptian singer and film actor
  - William Henry Draper Jr., 80, American diplomat, banker and army officer, died of a heart attack.
  - Gerald Heaney, 75, American stage magician who toured as "Heaney the Great" and later operated a mail-order business to sell magic supplies
  - Robert Sanders, 68, American composer, conductor and music teacher

== December 27, 1974 (Friday) ==
- An explosion and a fire in a coal mine near Liévin killed 41 miners in the worst mine disaster in France since World War II.
- A collision between two trains outside the main railroad station in Lisbon killed 9 people and injured 65. On the same day, a collision between a train and a bus at a railroad crossing on the outskirts of Rio de Janeiro killed 18 people and injured 18 others.
- In Managua, Nicaragua, an FSLN commando unit, headed by Edén Pastora, burst into the house of José María Castillo, former president of the Banco Central, and took his guests hostage (including two relatives of the dictator Somoza). Three days later, thanks to the intermediation of Miguel Obando y Bravo, the Archbishop of Managua, the hostages were released, in exchange for $1 million and the freedom of 14 political prisoners. Castillo and three guards were the only victims of the action.
- Born: Masi Oka, Japanese actor, producer, and digital effects artist; in Shibuya, Tokyo
- Died:
  - Amy Vanderbilt, 66, American authority on etiquette, newspaper columnist, and author of the bestseller Amy Vanderbilt's Complete Book of Etiquette, was killed after falling from a second-floor window of her townhouse in Manhattan in New York City.
  - Samuel Comer, 81, four-time Academy Award-winning set decorator
  - Vladimir Fock, 76, Soviet physicist

== December 28, 1974 (Saturday) ==
- A 6.2 magnitude earthquake in northern Pakistan killed 5,300 people, and injured 17,000, as well as destroying 4,400 homes. The quake struck in the late afternoon at 5:11 local time (12:11 UTC) and was concentrated in the village of Pattan in the Jammu and Kashmir region.
- Sheikh Mujibur Rahman, leader of Bangladesh, proclaimed a state of emergency and directed the Jatiya Rakkhi Bahini, the nation's paramilitary "National Defense Force", to arrest suspected terrorists and leaders of opposition political parties.
- All 24 people aboard a chartered tourist plane in Guatemala were killed when the Lockheed Lodestar 18 crashed during takeoff from Flores on its scheduled flight to Guatemala City. The 21 passengers were all American tourists who had spent the day viewing the Maya civilization ruins at Tikal. Most of the victims were from the New York City area and had chartered the trip after seeing it advertised in a teacher's magazine.
- In a 106 to 89 loss to the Atlanta Hawks, Elmore Smith of the Los Angeles Lakers had an unusual performance in a game where he made only one of 11 free throw attempts. He missed three consecutive shots from the free throw line (under the now defunct "three to make two" rule in the NBA at the time), all three of which failed to hit anything but the floor.
- The Texas Tech Red Raiders and the Vanderbilt Commodores played to a 6–6 tie in the Peach Bowl in Atlanta. In the Sun Bowl in El Paso, Texas, the Mississippi State Bulldogs defeated the North Carolina Tar Heels 26–24. In the Fiesta Bowl, played at Tempe, Arizona, the Oklahoma State Cowboys defeated the BYU Cougars 16–6. None of the six teams were ranked in the Top 20 but were invited to the postseason games because of winning records.
- Died:
  - Stephen Hayes, 71, Irish republican who served as the Irish Republican Army's chief of staff from 1939 to 1941, known for preparing Plan Kathleen, a plan for Nazi Germany to invade Northern Ireland in 1940
  - Hiralal Shastri, 75, Indian politician and the first Chief Minister of the state of Rajasthan, from 1949 to 1951
  - Edwin Eugene Aldrin Sr., 78, U.S. Army aviator and officer, father of astronaut Buzz Aldrin
  - Paul Dixon (born Gregory Schleier), 56, American television personality and talk show host, died of a heart ailment.
  - Giuseppe Dozza, 73, Italian Communist politician who was Mayor of Bologna from 1956 to 1966

== December 29, 1974 (Sunday) ==
- All 33 people aboard a TAROM airlines flight within Romania were killed when the Antonov An-24 turboprop crashed into the side of a mountain. The airplane was making its approach to Sibiu for an unscheduled stop, after departing Oradea on a flight to Bucharest. It made at an altitude of 5,600 feet (1,700 m) while making its approach to Sibiu and crashed into a peak in the Lotru Mountains.
- The contractual partnership of The Beatles was formally dissolved, more than four years after John Lennon, Paul McCartney, George Harrison and Ringo Starr had performed together for the last time.
- Soviet Olympic champion weightlifter Vasily Alekseyev set a new world record of 536.75 pounds (243.47 kg) in the super-heavyweight jerk.
- Born:
  - Mekhi Phifer, American TV and film actor known for the TV show ER and the film 8 Mile; in Harlem, New York City
  - Yevgeny Tarelkin, Russian cosmonaut (Soyuz TMA-06M); in Pervomaysky, Chita Oblast, Russian SFSR, Soviet Union
- Died:
  - Ivane Beritashvili, 89, Georgian Soviet physiologist and pioneer in biobehavioral science
  - Joseph W. Ferman, 68, Russian Empire-born American science fiction publisher (The Magazine of Fantasy & Science Fiction)
  - Sophie Podolski, 21, Belgian poet and graphic artist, died by suicide.

== December 30, 1974 (Monday) ==
- The Foreign Assistance Act of 1974 was signed into law after narrowly passing in both the U.S. Senate (46 to 45 on December 4) and the House of Representatives (201 to 189 on December 11). The law directed that the U.S. government should "substantially reduce or terminate security assistance to any government which engages in a consistent pattern of gross violations of internationally recognized human rights" and included the Hughes–Ryan Amendment requiring the president to report all covert operations of the CIA to Congress. The Act effectively eliminated aid and military funding for South Vietnam, which would fall to the North Vietnamese invasion four months later.
- A landslide caused by a construction crew killed 12 people in the town of Yuju in Yanchuan in the Shaanxi Province of the People's Republic of China. The crew was digging a canal when it dislodged part of a mountain.
- The Mongolian People's Republic passed its Nationality Act, declaring that any person, with at least one parent who was a Mongolian citizen, was automatically a citizen of Mongolia regardless of where that person was born or lived. The law would be amended in 1995 to provide that the automatic citizenship would be revoked for any person who became the citizen of another nation.
- A high school student shot and killed three people and an unborn child and injured 11 others in Olean, New York, after firing at bystanders from a third-floor window at Olean High School. Anthony F. Barbaro, 17, an honor student and member of the high school's rifle team, indiscriminately shot at people on the street from windows on the third floor of the school building.
- The Government of Honduras introduced, through Decree Law No. 170-74, a new agrarian reform.
- In college football's Gator Bowl, the #6-ranked Auburn Tigers defeated the #11 Texas Longhorns 27 to 3.
- Born:
  - Irma Vitovska, Ukrainian stage, film and TV actress known for starring in the TV series Lesya+Roma; in Ivano-Frankivsk, Ukrainian SSR, Soviet Union
  - S. Jithesh (aka Dr. Jitheshji), Indian speed cartoonist; in Pandalam Thekkekkara, Pathanamthitta district, Kerala
- Died:
  - Michel Alaux, 51, French-born American fencing master who coached U.S. Olympic fencing teams, died of cancer.
  - George Howard Earle III, 84, American politician and diplomat, Governor of Pennsylvania from 1935 to 1939

== December 31, 1974 (Tuesday) ==
- Restrictions on holding private gold within the United States, implemented by Franklin D. Roosevelt in 1933, were removed.
- The government of France implemented law number 74-696, breaking up the Office de Radiodiffusion Télévision Française (ORTF) broadcasting monopoly into seven businesses, effective January 6.
- The Privacy Act of 1974 was signed into law by U.S. President Ford, prohibiting the disclosure of information without the written consent of the subject individual, providing individuals a means to obtain their records and correct mistakes, and to find out whether the records have been disclosed.
- Dutch footballer Johan Cruyff, a player for FC Barcelona at the time, was awarded the Ballon d'Or as best soccer football player in Europe, becoming the first player to obtain the award three times.
- In the Sugar Bowl college football game in New Orleans, the 8th ranked Nebraska Cornhuskers defeated the 18th ranked Florida Gators, 13 to 10.
- Died:
  - Jacob Adler, 100, Austro-Hungarian born Galician Jew and later an American Yiddish language writer and humorist
  - V. R. Parton, 77, English chess enthusiast who invented several chess variants, including "Alice chess" and a 3-dimensional variant.
