= January 1975 =

Month of 1975

<<	January 1975					>>
Su	Mo	Tu	We	Th	Fr	Sa
			1	2	3	4
5	6	7	8	9	10	11
12	13	14	15	16	17	18
19	20	21	22	23	24	25
26	27	28	29	30	31

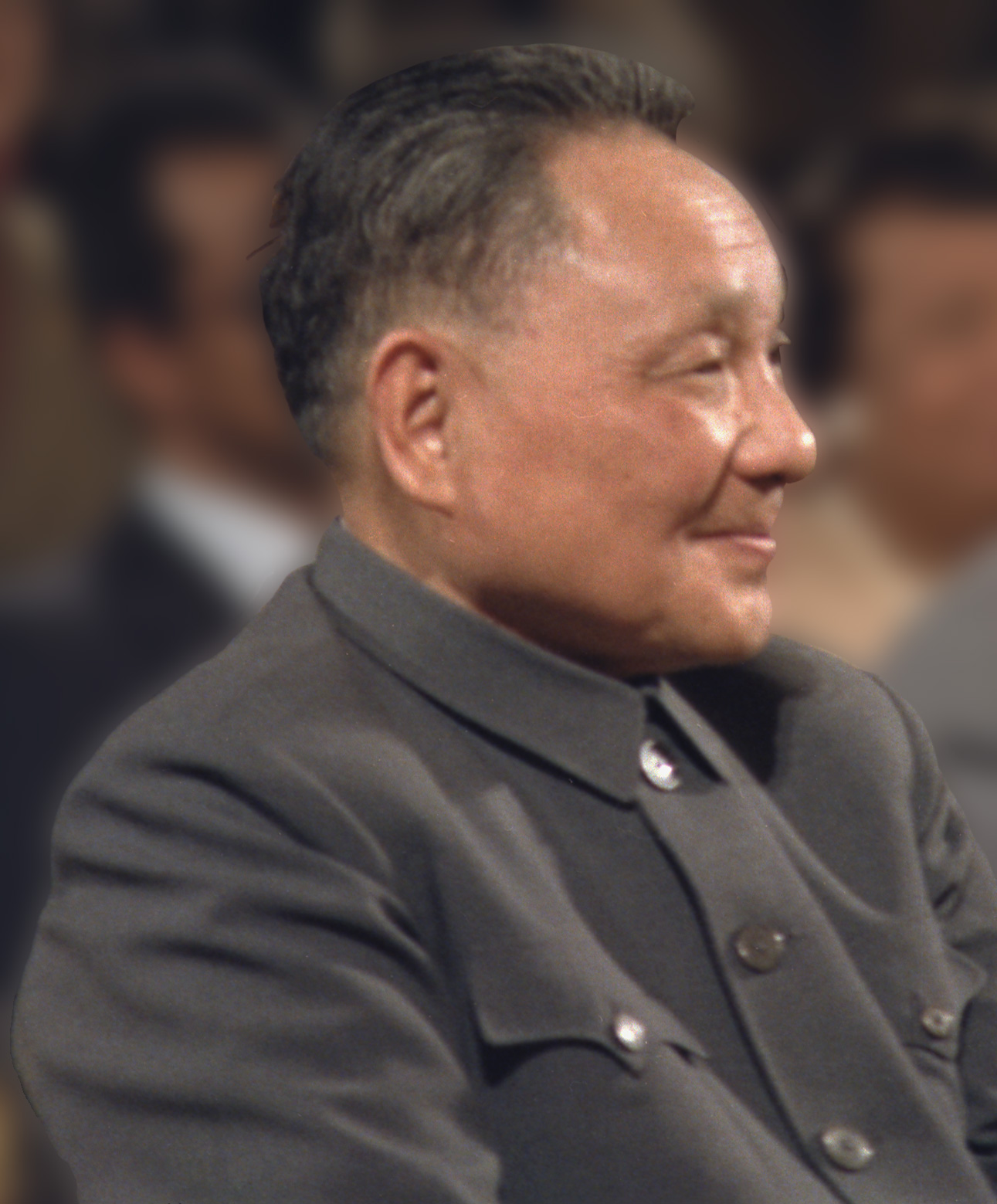
January 17, 1975: Deng Xiaoping returns to power

January 15, 1975: Space Mountain roller coaster opens

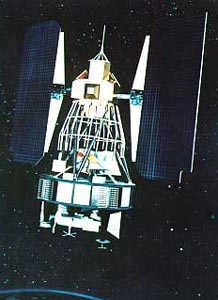
January 22, 1975: Landsat 2 launched into space

January 2, 1975: The World Tourism Organization is established

The following events occurred in January 1975:

== January 1, 1975 (Wednesday) ==
- The Khmer Rouge began the campaign that would put it in control of Cambodia, cutting off the supply lines to Phnom Penh.
- The new Constitution of Sweden came into effect.
- Former U.S. Attorney General John N. Mitchell, former White House Chief of Staff H. R. Haldeman, and John Ehrlichman were found guilty by a jury of 9 women and 3 men on charges of conspiracy, obstruction of justice, and perjury in the cover-up of the Watergate scandal. Robert Mardian, a fourth defendant, was found guilty on one count of conspiracy.
- Queen Elizabeth II conferred knighthood on comedian Charlie Chaplin, author P. G. Wodehouse, athlete Roger Bannister, and cricket legend Gary Sobers.
- The European-Mediterranean Seismological Center (EMSC), well known in Europe and worldwide as a geological and landscape observation and survey center, was founded in Strasbourg, France.
- In college football, the previously undefeated Alabama Crimson Tide, ranked No. 1 in the UPI poll and #2 by the AP, lost to No. 9 Notre Dame, 13–11, in the Orange Bowl, giving Irish coach Ara Parseghian a victory in his final game. The #5 USC Trojans, going for a 2-point conversion rather than kicking an extra point, defeated #3 Ohio State (#2 in UPI), 18–17, to win the Rose Bowl before a crowd of 106,000. The University of Oklahoma, ranked No. 1 by the AP, was ineligible for a bowl and for a ranking in the UPI Coaches' Poll, while #4 Michigan was not invited to a bowl.
- In the 1974 Cotton Bowl Classic, played in Dallas, the #7-ranked Penn State Nittany Lions defeated the #12-ranked Baylor Bears by a score of 41–20.
- In fiction, the 2000 novel White Teeth, by Zadie Smith, opens with Archie Jones making an attempt at suicide on January 1, 1975.

== January 2, 1975 (Thursday) ==
- Lalit Narayan Mishra, the Railway Minister of India, was assassinated as he attended a ceremony to dedicate a new railway line at Samastipur in the Bihar State. Mishra was fatally injured by a bomb that had been placed under the speaker's dais, in a blast that killed another person and injured 23 other people, and died the next day. Members of the terrorist group Ananda Marg claimed responsibility for the blast, aiming to retaliate for the imprisonment of their leader, Prabhat Ranjan Sarkar.
- Bangladeshi Marxist leader Siraj Sikder, after being arrested, was shot and killed. The official explanation that he died during an escape attempt was widely doubted.
- The bill approving the Federal Rules of Evidence was signed into law by U.S. President Ford.
- The World Tourism Organization (WTO) was established by the United Nations, replacing the International Union of Official Travel Organizations (IUOTO).
- The USC Trojans were ranked No. 1 in the final UPI college football poll, taken of college coaches, giving them a share of the mythical national championship.
- Died: Dimitrios Chiladiti, 91, Greek radiologist

== January 3, 1975 (Friday) ==
- In the largest return in history of U.S. government land to an American Indian tribe, 250 square miles (650 km^{2}) of the Grand Canyon National Monument were deeded back to the Havasupai people with the signing of a bill by President Ford. The 400 members of the tribe had been limited to a reservation of only 518 acres (210 ha), less than one square mile, at the bottom of Havasu Canyon, since 1882. The legislation also enlarged the National Park by adding 687,000 acres (278,000 ha) to bring its total size to 1,875 square miles (4,860 km^{2}).

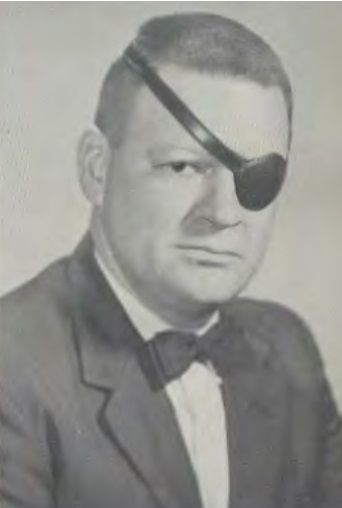
Governor Riley

- Bob C. Riley became the first blind person to serve as the governor of a U.S. state, when he was sworn in as Governor of Arkansas after Governor Dale Bumpers resigned to take office as a U.S. Senator. Riley, who had had his left eye removed after he was wounded, wore an eyepatch and could only perceive light and dark out of his right eye. Riley served the remaining 11 days of the term to which Bumpers had been elected in 1970. On January 14, David H. Pryor took office upon the expiration of his predecessor's term.
- The University of Oklahoma Sooners were given the number 1 ranking in the final AP sportswriters poll of the 1974 college football season, and a share of the unofficial national college football championship. The Sooners had been the only undefeated and untied team, but had been ineligible for postseason play, and were not included in the UPI coaches' poll. The USC Trojans, #1 in UPI, were 2nd in the AP poll.
- Died: Milton Cross, 77, announcer since 1931 for the weekly radio broadcasts of the Metropolitan Opera. Cross, known to his fans as "Mr. Opera", was preparing for the next day's show when he collapsed at his home.

== January 4, 1975 (Saturday) ==
- Henry Boucha of the Minnesota North Stars, who had been the NHL's Rookie of the Year two years earlier, suffered a career-ending eye injury after being high-sticked by Dave Forbes of the Boston Bruins during Boston's 8–0 win. Forbes would become the first American professional athlete to be criminally indicted for a crime committed in the course of a game, although the trial ended in a hung jury. In 1980, Boucha settled a lawsuit against Forbes, the Bruins and the NHL for $1,500,000.
- U.S. President Gerald R. Ford signed legislation making 55 miles per hour (89 km/h) the maximum speed limit across the United States, making permanent what had been a temporary order in 1973 by President Nixon.
- Executive Order 11828 created the Commission on CIA Activities within the United States, chaired by U.S. Vice-president Nelson Rockefeller.
- Wimbledon become the first non-league club to win at a First Division club in the F A cup third round since the creation of the Third Division in 1920. Altrincham almost achieve the same objective when holding Everton to a draw. Thirty-one of the Thirty-two ties take place with cup holders, Liverpool defeating Stoke while West Ham win at Southampton at the start of their ultimately victorious cup run.
- Died:
  - Bob Montana, 54, American comic strip artist who created the characters in Archie Comics
  - Carlo Levi, 71, Italian novelist and legislator

== January 5, 1975 (Sunday) ==
- The Tasman Bridge in Tasmania, Australia, was struck by the bulk ore carrier Lake Illawarra, killing 12 people. The ship struck a support on the mile-long bridge at about 9:00 pm, bringing down a 240-foot-long (73 m) section on top of it, and sank. Three vehicles on the bridge plunged into the River Derwent below.
- The leaders of the three military groups fighting for the independence of Angola- Jonas Savimbi of UNITA, Agostinho Neto of MPLA, and Holden Roberto of FNLA- signed the Mombasa Agreement in Kenya's capital, under the sponsorship of President Jomo Kenyatta, pledging to work together to negotiate with Portugal. The united front lasted only a few months, after the United States allied with UNITA and the Soviet Union assisted the MPLA.
- The Wiz, a musical adaptation of The Wonderful Wizard of Oz with an African-American cast, opened on Broadway. It would go on to win two Tony Awards and run for 1,672 performances.
- Born:
  - Mike Grier, the first African-American NHL player (1996–2011) to be born and trained in the United States; in Detroit
  - Warrick Dunn, American NFL running back; in Baton Rouge, Louisiana
  - Bradley Cooper, American actor (Alias, American Sniper); in Philadelphia
- Died:
  - Don Wilson, 29, American MLB pitcher for the Houston Astros (1966–1974), by carbon monoxide poisoning
  - Gottlob Berger, 79, convicted German SS General and Nazi war criminal who spent six years at Spandau prison
  - Rudolf Demme, 80, German Panzer division general who spent ten years in a Soviet prison

== January 6, 1975 (Monday) ==
- The game show Wheel of Fortune, created by Merv Griffin and inspired by the children's game "Hangman", premiered on NBC at 10:30 am Eastern time. The original hosts were Chuck Woolery and Susan Stafford, who would be replaced in 1982 by Pat Sajak and Vanna White, respectively.
- After the sale of gold was legalized in the United States, for the first time since 1933, on December 31, the U.S. Treasury conducted its first auction of a part of its gold reserves, setting aside an unprecedented 2,000,000 ounces (57,000,000 g) for sale, in individual 400-ounce (11,000 g) gold bricks, valued at $70,000 apiece based on the European market price of $175 an ounce. The first sealed bid that was opened was for $156 an ounce by the investment firm of Austern and Paul.
- AM America, which would later be replaced by Good Morning America, made its television debut on ABC at 7:00 am Eastern time. Intended to compete against the Today show and The CBS Morning News, the news series was hosted by Bill Beutel, with co-hosts Stephanie Edwards and Peter Jennings.
- Another World, an afternoon soap opera airing on NBC since 1964 as a 30-minute show, expanded to 60 minutes. It was the first ongoing attempt of a U.S. serial to air in a time slot of that length, and would be the beginning of a wave of other soaps expanding to 60-minute lengths. The last long-running 30-minute serial to expand to 60 minutes would be The Young and the Restless in 1980.
- An attempt by Malcolm Forbes to become the first person to fly a balloon across the Atlantic Ocean ended before it started. Multimillionaire publisher Forbes and aerospace scientist Thomas Heinsheimer were preparing to lift off from Santa Ana, California in the Windborne for a 7,000-mile (11,000 km) trip.
- Born: Ricardo Santos (aka Ricardo), Brazilian beach volleyball player and 2004 Olympic gold medalist; in Salvador, Bahia, Brazil
- Died: Burton K. Wheeler, 92, isolationist U.S. Senator for Montana from 1923 to 1947

== January 7, 1975 (Tuesday) ==
- The South Vietnamese province of Phuoc Binh became the first to be captured by Viet Cong invaders, who led an assault with tanks and three infantry divisions. Out of 5,400 South Vietnamese Army defenders, only 850 survived, and twenty Vietnam Air Force planes were shot down; local officials were summarily executed. U.S. Secretary of State Henry Kissinger would later write, "Phuoc Binh was the test case" for the North Vietnamese government to decide whether to proceed with trying to conquer South Vietnam, and "If the United States reacted, there was still a chance for Hanoi to withdraw from the brink."
- The women's basketball team of Louisiana Tech, which would go on to win three national championships and more than 80% of its games, played its very first game, and lost, 59–55, to visiting Southeastern Louisiana University. The crowd for the first was about 45 people.
- The Ascent of Man debuted on PBS, marking what The New York Times called "a milestone in television programing".

== January 8, 1975 (Wednesday) ==
- The Boston Globe broke an exclusive story that Soviet leader Leonid Brezhnev was going to arrive in Boston's Sidney Farber Cancer Center to receive treatment for leukemia. The hospital, the Kremlin and the White House quickly denied the story and the Globe soon admitted that it had been the victim of a hoax. Brezhnev, who did not have leukemia and who was not coming to the United States, would live on until 1982.
- After South Vietnam's Phuoc Long province had been conquered without any intervention by the United States, the Politburo of North Vietnam's Communist Party approved "Campaign 275", to "liberate" the rest of South Vietnam, starting with a full-scale attack on the Central Highlands. Party First Secretary Lê Duẩn ordered strikes on Buôn Ma Thuột, Tuy Hòa, Qui Nhơn, Huế and Da Nang.
- Ella Grasso became Governor of Connecticut, the first female U.S. governor who did not succeed her husband.
- Convicted Watergate conspirators John W. Dean III, Jeb Stuart Magruder and Herbert W. Kalmbach were released from prison after serving sentences ranging from four months to seven months.
- Died:
  - Richard Tucker, 61, American operatic tenor, while on tour with the Metropolitan Opera
  - David "Carbine" Williams, 74, inventor of M-1 carbine rifle, portrayed by Jimmy Stewart in the 1952 film Carbine Williams

== January 9, 1975 (Thursday) ==
- Denmark's Liberal Party, led by Prime Minister Poul Hartling, gained seats in the election for the Parliament, the 179 seat Folketing, to increase its share to 42 members. The Social Democrats gained as well, winning 53 seats.
- "The Beatles & Co., Ltd.", the corporation created by John Lennon, Paul McCartney, George Harrison and Ringo Starr to pay them as employees in order to effect a savings on taxes, was formally dissolved by a court in London, four years after McCartney had filed suit in the year after the band's breakup.
- Died:
  - Li Fuchun, 74, Communist Chinese economic planner
  - Virginia Ellis Jenckes, 97, U.S. Representative 1933–39, and first woman to represent Indiana in Congress
  - Pierre Fresnay, 77, French actor

== January 10, 1975 (Friday) ==
- Pope Paul VI broke a 900-year-old policy by accepting a woman as an envoy to the Vatican. Bernadette Olowo was appointed by Uganda, which had 3.5 million Roman Catholics, more than any other nation in Africa, and was also that nation's ambassador to West Germany. A spokesman for the Vatican said, "The acceptance of a woman ambassador will be subject to the same rules as men," including good moral behavior and compliance with Roman Catholic doctrine. The year before, the Pope had rejected an Australian nomination of a woman ambassador because she was a divorcee. Forty years earlier, Pope Pius XI had declared that women should not work at any occupation outside the home.
- The Queen Elizabeth 2 began its first round-the-world cruise, departing New York City under tight security with 1,200 passengers.
- Born:
  - Jake Delhomme, American NFL quarterback; in Breaux Bridge, Louisiana
  - Jason Pargin, American novelist, humorist and Internet personality, in Lawrenceville, Illinois

== January 11, 1975 (Saturday) ==
- Soyuz 17, with Soviet cosmonauts Aleksei Gubarev and Georgi Grechko, both 43 and making their first flights, lifted off from the Baikonur space center and docked successfully with the Salyut 4 space station, becoming the first men to occupy it. They would return to Earth on February 7 after setting a new record for most days (28) spent in outer space.
- The last remains of the rocket that had launched Skylab into orbit in 1973, re-entered the atmosphere and burned up at about 3:00 pm EST.
- Ipswich Town defeat Middlesbrough 2–0 to maintain a one-point lead in the English Soccer First Division with sixteen games remaining. Roger Osborne and David Johnson are the goal scorers.
- The Pro Football Hall of Fame announced that it would induct four new members: Roosevelt Brown, George Connor, Dante Lavelli and Lenny Moore.
- Born: Matteo Renzi, Prime Minister of Italy from 2014 to 2016; in Florence
- Died: Paul Peter Meouchi, 80, Lebanese Maronite priest and first Maronite to serve in the Vatican's college of cardinals

== January 12, 1975 (Sunday) ==
- The Pittsburgh Steelers defeated the Minnesota Vikings 16–6 at Tulane Stadium in New Orleans, Louisiana, to win Super Bowl IX and their first NFL championship in their 42-year history. The Steelers led 2–0 at halftime after Dwight White sacked Vikings' quarterback Fran Tarkenton in the end zone, and only 9–6 in the last quarter until Pittsburgh drove to another touchdown late in the game.
- Caryn Campbell vanished while walking from the lobby to her room at the Wildwood Inn at Snowmass, Colorado. She was the 15th victim of serial killer Ted Bundy, but the first for whose murder he ever stood trial.
- Maharishi Mahesh Yogi, guru of the Transcendental Meditation movement, declared to a gathering of thousands of his followers, at Hertenstein, on Lake Lucerne in Switzerland, that the dawn of the new Age of Enlightenment had arrived.

== January 13, 1975 (Monday) ==
- In a crime that shocked all of India, terrorists from the Mizo National Front (MNF) charged into the police headquarters at Aizawl, capital of the Mizoram state, and murdered the three top officials- Inspector General G.S. Arya, Deputy Inspector Sewa and Police Superintendent Panchapakesan.
- Terrorists attempted to shoot down an El Al airliner that was preparing to take off from Orly airport in Paris on a flight to New York with 136 passengers. The missile failed to hit due to the pilot's evasive action and struck a Yugoslavian DC-9 that had not yet boarded but failed to explode. A second attempt was made six days later, and the two tries were traced to the Popular Front for the Liberation of Palestine, to Muamar Gadhafi, and to the international terrorist Ilich Ramirez Sanchez (Carlos).
- The Chrysler Corporation began offering rebates of up to $400 on specific models of new cars and light trucks in what was described as "an unprecedented five week campaign". The move was driven by an inventory of 340,000 unsold 1975 models, with the incentive of paying customers rather than reducing the sticker price.
- The coldest wind chill ever recorded in North America was measured at Kugaaruk, in the Nunavut territory of Canada (formerly Pelly Bay, Northwest Territories). An air temperature of −60 °F (−51 °C) and a wind speed of 35 miles per hour (56 km/h) combined for a wind chill factor of -135 °F (-78 °C).

== January 14, 1975 (Tuesday) ==
- The House Un-American Activities Committee, most notable for its investigations and accusations of Communist infiltration of Hollywood, was disbanded by the U.S. House of Representatives after 37 years. In 1969, it had been renamed the "Committee on Internal Security".
- U.S. Secretary of State Henry Kissinger announced that the Soviet Union was rescinding its agreement to a trade deal with the United States, eleven days after the Jackson–Vanik amendment to the Trade Act of 1974 had been signed into law. The amendment, sponsored by U.S. Senator and Democratic presidential candidate Henry M. Jackson (as well as U.S. Representative Charles Vanik), provided that nations with "non-market economies" that restricted emigration were to be denied most favored nation status, and had been aimed at putting pressure on the Soviet Union to drop its opposition to allowing its Jewish citizens to emigrate. Soviet First Secretary Leonid Brezhnev had sent a letter to U.S. President Ford on December 25, warning that the amendment was unacceptable. The amendment had the opposite effect, with Jewish emigration decreasing by 35% between 1974 and 1975.
- The Convention on Registration of Launched Objects into Outer Space, an international treaty requiring the signatory nations to keep the United Nations informed of the orbital details of any object launched into outer space, was signed in New York, and went into effect on September 15, 1976.
- U.S. Vice-president Nelson Rockefeller was named by President Ford to chair a special commission to investigate domestic spying by the Central Intelligence Agency.
- Born: Rodolfo Sancho, Spanish television actor best known for his portrayal of King Ferdinand II in the TV series Isabel, and winner of two Premios Iris for Best Male Actor; in Madrid

== January 15, 1975 (Wednesday) ==
- The Alvor Agreement was signed at the Penina Golfe Hotel in Alvor, Portugal, by the chiefs of the three groups fighting for the independence of Angola (Savimbi, Neto and Roberto) and President Costa Gomes of Portugal, after which the Portuguese government announced a date of November 11, 1975, for the independence of the colony of Portuguese West Africa as Angola.
- CIA Director William Colby confirmed the reports from New York Times reporter Seymour Hersh and revealed to a U.S. Senate subcommittee that the agency had violated its charter by spying on American citizens for activities within the United States.
- Space Mountain, an enclosed roller coaster, operated in near darkness, opened at Walt Disney World in Florida, and would later be duplicated at the other Disney parks.
- Born: Mary Pierce, Canadian-born French professional tennis player; winner of Australian Open, 1995, and French Open, 2000; in Montreal
- Died: Ernest Koliqi, 78, Albanian poet

== January 16, 1975 (Thursday) ==
- A U.S. District Court jury awarded $12,000,000 to 1,200 anti-war demonstrators who had been illegally arrested on May 5, 1971, while they listened to a speech by Congressman Ronald Dellums of California at the U.S. Capitol. The amount was ordered payable by the District of Columbia government, following the suit by the ACLU. Many of the group had been detained at makeshift compounds, including the RFK Stadium. The ACLU had located 900 of the named plaintiffs.

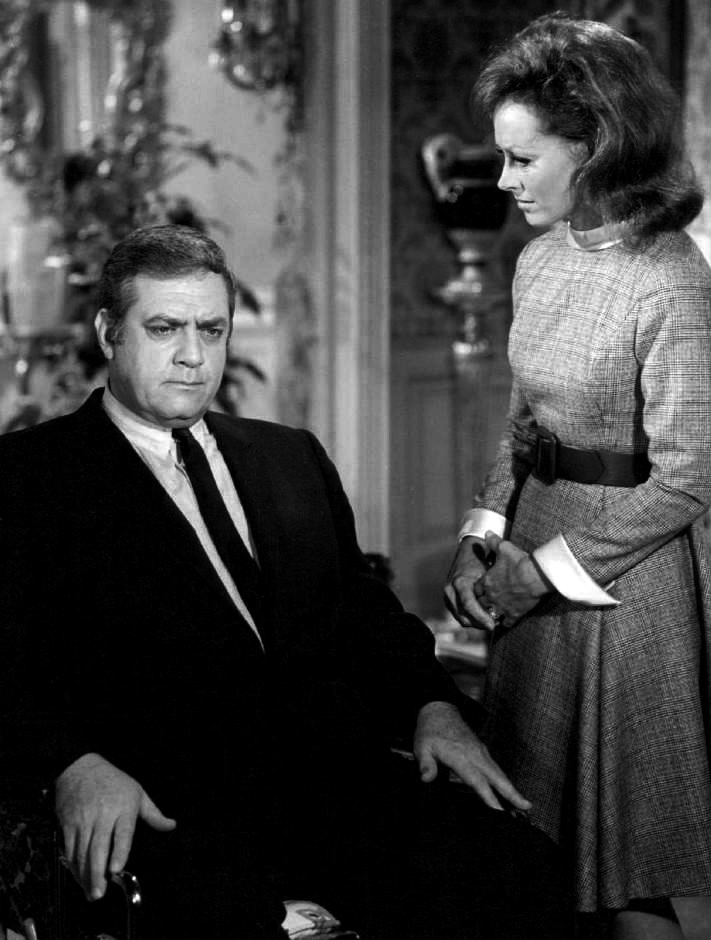
Ironside

- The NBC television show Ironside, starring Raymond Burr as wheelchair-using police detective Robert Ironside, aired its 199th and final episode after a run of eight seasons.

== January 17, 1975 (Friday) ==
- At the first meeting of China's 4th National People's Congress in ten years, the presidency was abolished. Zhou Enlai was re-elected as Premier. Deng Xiaoping, who had fallen from grace and purged from office by the Chinese Communist Party eight years earlier during the Cultural Revolution, on accusations of being a "capitalist roader", was re-elected as a Vice-Premier and Chief-of-Staff of the armed forces. Deng was also named vice-chairman of the party in a separate meeting. Ye Jianying was made Defense Minister, filling a spot left vacant by the death of the vilified Lin Biao. A new Constitution for the People's Republic was promulgated on the same day.
- After the French Chamber of Deputies voted 284–189 in favor of legalization of abortion, the law proposed by Simone Veil went into effect, allowing abortion on demand during the first ten weeks of pregnancy.
- Born: Tony Brown, New Zealand rugby union football player; in Balclutha
- Died: General Gustavo Rojas Pinilla, 74, President of Colombia from 1953 to 1957

== January 18, 1975 (Saturday) ==
- The derailment of a train near Cairo killed 27 people in Egypt and injured 52.
- The first of 253 episodes of The Jeffersons was telecast, as Isabel Sanford, Mike Evans and Sherman Hemsley, took their recurring characters on All in the Family (Louise, Lionel and George Jefferson) to a spinoff TV series that would run for eleven seasons, concluding in 1985.
- Died: Álvaro Pineda, Mexican-born American horse racing jockey, was killed when his horse, "Austin Mittler", reared inside the starting gate before a race at Santa Anita Park in California. Pineda was crushed between the horse and the iron bars of the gate.

== January 19, 1975 (Sunday) ==
- A 6.8 magnitude earthquake struck in the state of Himachal Pradesh, India, at 1:30 pm local time, killing 47 people, mostly in the township of Kaurik.
- Three Arab gunmen went to the observation deck at Orly Airport in Paris and tried to shoot down at El Al 747 jumbo jet as it was taking off from Paris to Tel Aviv with 220 people on board. After police prevented them from succeeding, the gunmen fired machine guns into the crowd and threw grenades, wounding 78 people, then took ten hostages. After 17 hours, the men were allowed to depart on a flight to Iraq after freeing all of their hostages.
- The United States Atomic Energy Commission was split up into the Nuclear Regulatory Commission (NRC) and the Energy Research and Development Administration (ERDA), under the terms of the Energy Reorganization Act of 1974. The NRC assumed the functions of regulating private nuclear power plants, while ERDA oversaw nuclear weapons.
- A group of four surfers became the first to ride the 15-foot (4.6 m) breaker at Kaena Point in Hawaii, described in at least one source as "the final big-wave frontier".
- Died:
  - Thomas Hart Benton, 85, known for his painting of murals across the United States, died the day after completing his final work, entitled The Sources of Country Music.
  - Patrick Toner, 7, was killed by an IRA booby trap bomb near his home in Forkhill, Northern Ireland. Toner, the son of a farmer, was directing cattle down the road in the County Armagh village, and obeyed orders to not move after security officers spotted the land mine. One of the cattle, however, moved forward and stepped on the mine. Toner became the first fatality since the expiration of a cease-fire for the holidays, and the 1,144th person to die in "The Troubles" since the conflict began in 1969.

== January 20, 1975 (Monday) ==
- Work was abandoned on the British end of the Channel Tunnel. The House of Commons approved cancellation of the project, 294–218, after Environment Secretary Anthony Crosland said that the nation could no longer afford the cost, which had increased to $4.6 billion. Crosland, 56, said that he expected that the tunnel would be finished during his lifetime, but he died two years later. Work was restarted in 1986 as a private venture, and the tunnel was completed in 1994.
- The Passamaquoddy and the Penobscot Indian tribes received a major victory in their lawsuit against the U.S. Department of the Interior and their claims against the State of Maine, when U.S. District Judge Edward T. Gignoux ruled in Portland that the Interior Department had to intervene on their side in the case, based on the Nonintercourse Act of 1790. The two small tribes would go on to obtain an $81,500,000 settlement and build a huge gambling empire.
- Life University, founded by Sid E. Williams and located in Marietta, Georgia, held its first classes, as Life Chiropractic College, with 22 students enrolled. By 1995, it had more than 4,000 students.
- Michael Ovitz, Michael Rosenfeld, Ron Meyer, Bill Haber, and Rowland Perkins founded the Creative Artists Agency after departing from the William Morris agency, and built CAA into one of the most powerful groups of sports agents and entertainment agents.
- Provisional IRA member Kevin Coen was killed by soldiers while attempting to hijack a bus in Kinawley, Northern Ireland.
- Born: David Eckstein, American MLB baseball player and 2006 World Series MVP; in Sanford, Florida
- Died: Kay Summersby, 66, wartime chauffeur for General Dwight Eisenhower who wrote about their extramarital relationship in her book, Past Forgetting

== January 21, 1975 (Tuesday) ==
- In the English town of Todmorden, Dr. Harold Shipman, a young general practitioner, made a house call to 73-year-old widow Lily Crossley, who died half an hour after he left. Later in the day, he visited Elizabeth Pearce, 84, who died a few minutes later of what he listed as a cerebral hemorrhage. At the close of the day, he visited Robert Lingard, 63, who died minutes later of what Dr. Shipman described as a heart attack. They were the first of hundreds of Dr. Shipman's patients to die after he treated them, until his arrest in 1998. Officially, there were 215 confirmed victims, and he was suspected in the deaths of another 200.
- The bodies of ten men and three women were found at Club Gargantua, a topless bar in Montreal, victims of an apparent gangland slaying. The club's manager was shot, and the entire group was herded into a storeroom, which was then padlocked and set afire. The 29-year-old gangster suspected in the murders, Richard Blass, nicknamed "The Cat" for his ability to elude attempts on life and to escape jail three times, was killed three days later by Montreal police after going for his gun when he was cornered.
- The United States Supreme Court rendered its decision in Taylor v. Louisiana, invalidating a Louisiana state law that exempted women from jury duty unless they specifically requested to be eligible.
- The National Hockey League became the first American sports league to allow women journalists into the players' locker room for interviews, a privilege formerly reserved for men. The NBA followed suit later in the year, with MLB and the NFL not admitting female reporters until later. The two women included in the press at the game in Montreal (which the Wales Conference won 7–1 over the Campbell Conference) were Robin Herman of The New York Times and Marcelle St. Cyr of Montreal radio station CKLM.
- Two would-be IRA bombers, John Kelly and John Stone, were killed when the bomb they were transporting detonated prematurely in Victoria Street, Belfast, Northern Ireland. Only the bombers were killed in the explosion.

== January 22, 1975 (Wednesday) ==
- Almost 50 years after it had been proposed, the United States ratification of the Geneva Protocol of 1925, officially the "Protocol for the Prohibition of the Use in War of Asphyxiating, Poisonous or other Gases, and of Bacteriological Methods of Warfare", a treaty to ban use of poison gases in wartime was confirmed by U.S. President Ford. The U.S. Senate had voted in favor of ratification, 93–0, on December 16, 1974.
- Landsat 2, the second in a series of American satellites designed to photograph images around the world, was launched from Vandenberg Air Force Base at 9:56 am. Nine days earlier, ERTS-1 (launched on July 23, 1972) was renamed Landsat 1 while in orbit above the Earth. Landsat 2 was removed from service on February 25, 1982.
- A crowd of 3,000 people, angry about the mishandling of flood relief by Governor Khlai Chitphithak of Nakhon Si Thammarat Province in Thailand, attacked his official residence and burned it to the ground. The Governor was able to escape the city and to flee to Bangkok.
- Aston Villa will face Norwich City in the English Soccer Football League Cup Final after the former defeat Chester City 3–2 on the night and 5–4 on aggregate while the latter defeat Manchester United 1–0 on the night and 3–2 on aggregate in the second leg of their semi final ties. Brian Little, for Villa, and Colin Suggett, for Norwich, are the winning goal scorers.

== January 23, 1975 (Thursday) ==
- Dr. Andreas Gruentzig, a heart surgeon at the University of Zurich, successfully inflated a double-lumen balloon catheter (which he had designed with his wife, assistant to her husband) to dilate the iliac artery of a dog without the side effects of creating an embolism. Later in the year, on September 24, he would first test the method on a coronary artery, and on September 16, 1976, he would use the technique for the first angioplasty on a human being.
- U.S. President Gerald Ford signed a proclamation for an eventual three-dollar per barrel fee on imported oil, with a one dollar fee effective on February 1, followed by similar increases on March 1 and April 1. Ten northeastern States would receive rebates on the fees due to their heavier reliance on imported oil. Congress voted to delay the increase for 90 days, and a federal court eventually ruled that the President did not have the power to implement fees independently of Congress.
- The first measurement of astronomical data by an asteroidal occultation took place as astronomers in North America gathered information from the passage of 433 Eros between the Earth and the star Kappa Geminorum.
- Born: Tito Ortiz, American martial artist; UFC light heavyweight champion, 2000 to 2003; in Santa Ana, California

== January 24, 1975 (Friday) ==
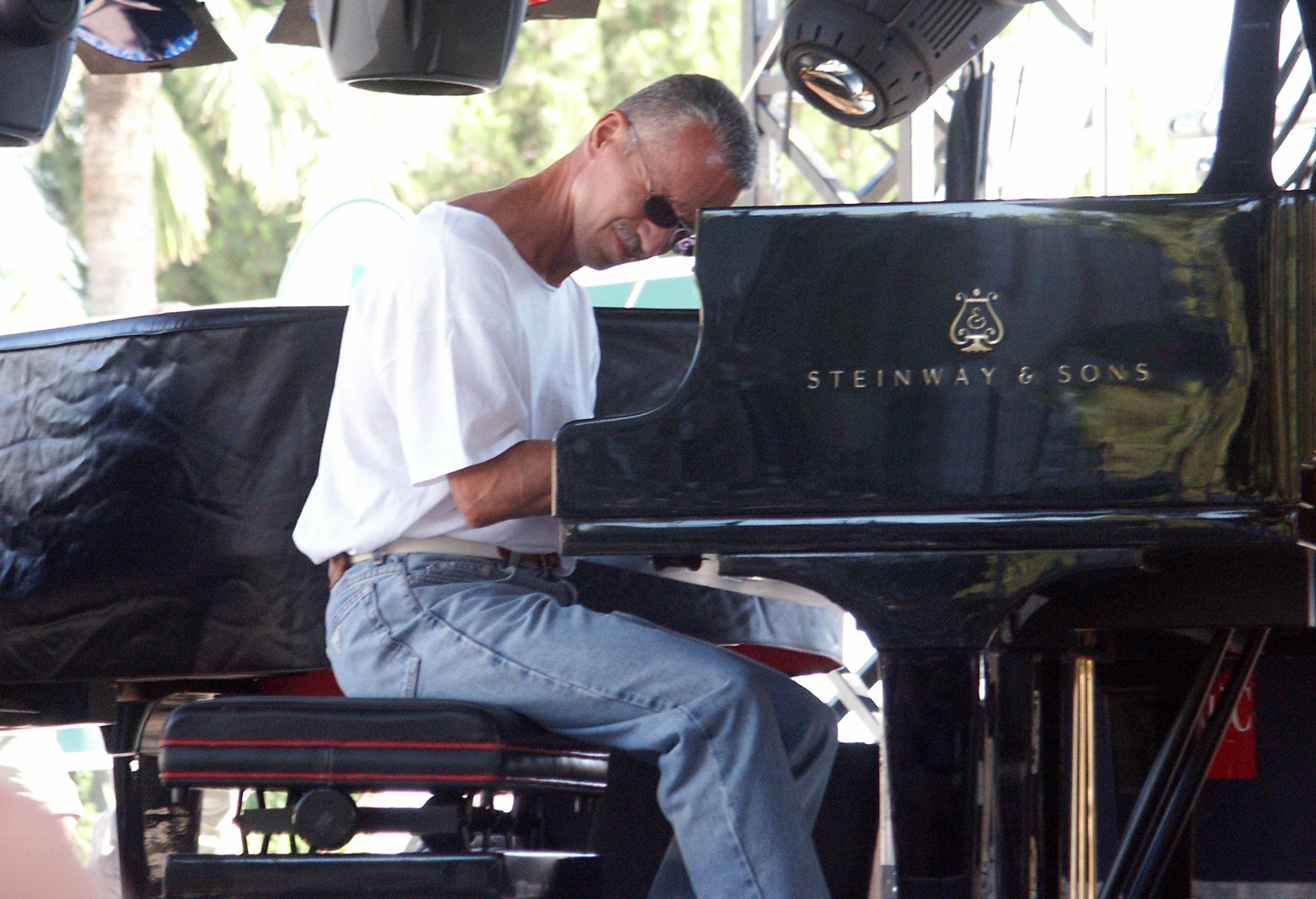
Jarrett

- Jazz pianist Keith Jarrett played the solo improvisation 'The Köln Concert' at the Cologne Opera. The live performance became the best-selling piano recording in history.
- Dr. Donald Coggan was made the new Archbishop of Canterbury, the administrator of the Church of England.
- A bomb, planted by the Puerto Rican nationalist group FALN, killed 4 people and injured 58 at The Anglers' Club of New York at 101 Broad Street in New York City. The club was located in the dining room of the Frances Tavern, where George Washington had given his Farewell Address in 1783. A note from the group said that the bombing was in retaliation for a blast on January 11 in Mayagüez, which the FALN said had been placed by the CIA, and had killed 2 people and injured 11.
- Dr. Jeffrey MacDonald was arrested at his home in Huntington Beach, California after being indicted by a federal grand jury in North Carolina, for the February 17, 1970 murders of his wife and two daughters while he had been in the U.S. Army. Murder charges had been brought against MacDonald but dropped that year for lack of evidence. MacDonald maintained that the killings had been done by four hippies who chanted "Acid is groovy, kill the pigs" before beating him unconscious, and that he had woken to find his family dead. MacDonald was freed on bail a week later. His case came to trial in 1979, and he was found guilty of murder and sentenced to life imprisonment. A federal court reversed the conviction in 1980 and MacDonald was freed on bail again, then re-arrested and imprisoned in 1982 after the verdict was upheld.
- Only seven months after its launch, the Salyut 3 space station was deorbited by the Soviet Union, a day after the secret test-firing of its defensive cannon. It was later determined that the firing of the shells had not played a role in taking the station out of orbit. Salyut 3 re-entered the atmosphere over the Pacific Ocean and burned up.
- British soldier Thomas Lea died eight months after being injured in an IRA bomb attack in Belfast, Northern Ireland.
- Died: Larry Fine, 72, who had been one of The Three Stooges along with Moe Howard (who would die on May 4) and Curly Howard

== January 25, 1975 (Saturday) ==
- Sheikh Mujibur Rahman, the first President of Bangladesh, declared a state of emergency and was authorized to rule by decree. Shortly afterward, the legislature, dominated by the Awami League party, banned all opposition political parties.
- Liverpool's defence of the English Soccer F A cup ended in the fourth round when they were defeated 0–1 at Ipswich Town with a goal from Mick Mills. Eventual cup winners, West Ham were held to a 1–1 draw in their tie against Swindon Town.
- Born:
  - Ricky Rodriguez, described by the Family International cult as the first product of "flirty fishing" and heir apparent to cult leader David Berg (d. 2005)
  - Tim Montgomery, American track athlete, 2000 Olympic gold medalist; in Gaffney, South Carolina

== January 26, 1975 (Sunday) ==
- In what The New York Times described as "Thailand's freest and fairest national election in history", the winners were divided among 22 political parties for the 269 seat House of Representatives. The Democrat Party won 72 of the available seats, or roughly 27%, and Seni Pramoj formed a coalition government that would last only two weeks, before he was replaced by his brother.
- The Order of Australia was created.
- An IRA booby trap bomb, left at the Air Training Corps premises in Belfast, Northern Ireland, killed a sixteen-year-old cadet, Edward Wilson.
- Immaculata University defeated the University of Maryland 80–48 in the first nationally televised women's basketball game in the United States.

== January 27, 1975 (Monday) ==
- The U.S. Senate voted 82–4 to establish its own special committee to investigate the CIA, with Frank Church of Idaho as the chairman.

== January 28, 1975 (Tuesday) ==
- Japan and the Soviet Union signed an agreement for a joint venture of drilling for oil on Sakhalin Island, former Japanese territory that became part of the USSR. In return for funding of the development, Japan would receive "a significant discount on half of the pumped oil" for ten years.
- Be My Valentine, Charlie Brown premiered on CBS.
- Died:
  - Antonín Novotný, 70, President of Czechoslovakia 1957–1968
  - Arthur Judson, 93, artists' manager for New York Philharmonic and Philadelphia Orchestra and a co-founder of the Columbia Broadcasting System

== January 29, 1975 (Wednesday) ==
- The Weather Underground bombed the U.S. State Department main office in Washington, D.C.
- Seventeen-year-old Robert McCullough, a Catholic, was killed by the UDA at his workplace in Belfast, Northern Ireland. The murder was thought to be a random sectarian retaliation for the murder of a teenage Protestant in an IRA bomb three days earlier.
- Born: Sara Gilbert, American TV actress (Roseanne) and panelist (The Talk); as Sara Rebecca Abeles in Santa Monica, California

== January 30, 1975 (Thursday) ==
- A professor of architecture in Budapest applied to the patent office in Hungary for his invention, which he called Terbeli logikai jatek ("Spatial logic game") Bűvös Kocka ("Magic Cube"). Patent #HU 170,062 was granted on March 28, 1977, to Ernő Rubik.
- Turkish Airlines Flight 345 fell into the Sea of Marmara while coming in for a landing in Istanbul. Electric power at the airport failed as the plane, arriving from İzmir, was descending, and the pilot abandoned the landing and was circling when the jet fell from the sky. All 38 passengers and the crew of 4 were killed.
- The area around the wreckage of the gunboat USS Monitor, which had sunk in 1862 off of Cape Hatteras, North Carolina, was designated as the first National Marine Sanctuary in the United States. The ship, which had fought the CSS Virginia (better known as Merrimack) in the most famous naval battle of the American Civil War, had become an artificial reef over 110 years prior to its location on August 27, 1973.
- The January 31 deadline for amnesty for draft dodgers who fled from the United States during the Vietnam War was extended to March 1. To that time, about 7,400 of 137,000 eligible had participated in the program, which required one year of volunteer service to avoid prosecution.
- Born: Yasir Qadhi, Pakistani-American Islamic theologian and preacher; in Houston, Texas

== January 31, 1975 (Friday) ==
- The last victim of the serial killer known as the "Skid Row Slasher" was claimed after Clyde Hay, a 43-year-old cash register repairman, was found dead in his home in Hollywood, California. Hay was the killer's ninth victim in two months. The first seven had been transients in Los Angeles. Two days later, the killer was forced to flee during his next murder attempt but left a clue that would end his spree. Vaughn Greenwood would be convicted on nine counts of first-degree murder almost two years later.
- Twenty-seven people on board the Greek oil tanker SS Corinthos were killed after their ship was struck by the American freighter Edgar M. Queeny. The Corinthos had been docked at Marcus Hook, Pennsylvania, and was unloading its cargo of crude oil at a dockside refinery operated by British Petroleum when it was struck by the freighter, which was making a course change.
- RUC Constable George Coulter was shot dead by the IRA while at a mobile Police patrol near Dungannon, Northern Ireland. He was the ninth and last official Northern Ireland Troubles related fatality during the month and the only Police Officer killed.
- Born: Preity Zinta, Indian film actress; in Shimla, Himachal Pradesh state
- Died:
  - Bernard Fitzalan-Howard, 16th Duke of Norfolk, 66, the Earl Marshal of the United Kingdom who choreographed coronations, funerals and other state occasions
  - Ida May Fuller, 100, former legal secretary and first American to ever receive social security benefits
