= Walter Wheeler =

Walter Wheeler may refer to:

- Walter Wheeler (cricketer)
- Walter Wheeler (politician)
- Walter H. Wheeler Jr., American businessman and sailor
