= Leticia Herrera =

Leticia Herrera may refer to:

- Juana Leticia Herrera Ale (born 1960), Mexican politician
- Leticia Herrera Sánchez (born 1949), Nicaraguan lawyer, guerrilla leader, and politician
