= Ellen Ellis =

Ellen Ellis may refer to:

- Ellen Elizabeth Ellis, New Zealand feminist and writer
- Ellen Deborah Ellis, American professor of history and political science
