= 1974 Nicaraguan hostage crisis =

The 1974 Nicaraguan hostage crisis was a hostage-taking operation in Nicaragua carried out by the Sandinista National Liberation Front (FSLN) on December 27, 1974, at the Managua residence of José María "Chema" Castillo Quant, a Nicaraguan banker and former government minister. Thirteen Sandinista guerrillas stormed Castillo’s Christmas party being held in honor of U.S. Ambassador Turner B. Shelton, taking approximately 20 prominent hostages including Nicaragua's ambassador to the United States and several government officials. The National Guard laid siege for 61 hours. The crisis finally ended on December 30 with the release of 14 political prisoners, payment of a $1 million ransom, and the guerrillas' safe passage to Cuba.

The raid occurred during the rule of President Anastasio Somoza Debayle, whose family had governed Nicaragua since 1933. The FSLN had been rebuilding after being nearly destroyed by government forces in the early 1970s. The raid rejuvenated the struggling Sandinista movement and led to mass recruitment.

== Background ==
The Somoza dynasty had ruled Nicaragua since 1933, when General Anastasio Somoza García seized power. His son, Anastasio Somoza Debayle, was president at the time of the raid. In opposition to the regime was the Sandinista National Liberation Front (FSLN), founded in the early 1960s and named after Augusto César Sandino, who had fought against U.S. occupation and was assassinated by Somoza García's forces in 1934.

By 1970, the FSLN was nearly defunct, its military forays crushed and most leaders jailed or exiled. Over the next four years, a small corps of activists, named the Sandinista National Directorate, painstakingly rebuilt an underground network. By 1974, the Sandinista National Directorate decided their forces were rebuilt enough to renew open warfare. They planned an assault with three goals: free jailed comrades, raise money, and announce their return to armed struggle.

Several months before the operation, a squad of 13 carefully selected young Sandinistas (including three women) received intense political and physical preparation under Tomás Borge's direction. The target was the Christmas party of José María "Chema" Castillo Quant, a former Agriculture Minister, president of the Central Bank, and close friend of President Somoza. The party was held in his honor for U.S. Ambassador Turner B. Shelton at Castillo's ranch-style home in the affluent Los Robles district of Managua. Notably, Nicaraguan Ambassador to the U.S., Dr. Guillermo Sevilla-Sacasa (President Somoza's brother-in-law), his wife Lillian Somoza de Sevilla-Sacasa, and their son had traveled to Managua for the holidays and decided to stay for the party.

== Raid ==
At 11:15 PM on December 27, 1974, the Sandinista guerrillas, led by Eduardo Contreras and including Germán Pomares, Leticia Herrera, and Joaquín Cuadra, stormed the residence. Three guards at the gates were shot and killed. The host, José María Castillo, was killed during the initial assault when he reportedly tried to reach for a gun to resist. The guerrillas seized approximately 20 prominent hostages. U.S. Ambassador Turner B. Shelton had left the party minutes before the attack and avoided capture.

Key hostages taken included Dr. Guillermo Sevilla-Sacasa, Nicaraguan Ambassador to the U.S. and dean of Washington's diplomatic corps, along with Guillermo Lang, Nicaragua's chief delegate to the United Nations. Among the captured officials were Luis Valle Olivares, Minister of the National District, and Alejandro Montiel Arguello, Nicaragua's Foreign Minister. The Sandinistas also seized Noel Pallais Debayle, president of government development bank Infonac and cousin of Somoza, as well as prominent businessman Franco Chamorro. Additional hostages included the Chilean Ambassador to Managua and David Carpenter, the 24-year-old American son-in-law of the party's host, Castillo.

The house was quickly cordoned off by the U.S.-trained National Guard. President Somoza, who was in the United States at the time, flew back to Nicaragua. Upon his return, he declared martial law and suspended all constitutional guarantees.

Archbishop of Managua, Miguel Obando y Bravo, acted as a mediator. The guerrillas' demands were the release of approximately 40 political prisoners, a ransom of $1 million, and safe passage out of the country. During the day, the guerrillas released 17 hostages, including wives, maids, and musicians.

Dr. Sevilla-Sacasa was permitted to call his family in Washington, reporting he was "unharmed and doing very, very well" and that none of the hostages had been harmed. By evening, the government indicated it had agreed to the demands, and a Lanica Airlines Convair jet was prepared at the airport.

Negotiations, led by Archbishop Obando y Bravo, continued through the night. The government negotiated the number of prisoners down to 14. On the morning of December 30, all of Nicaragua's radio stations broadcast an 80-minute, 12,000-word anti-government manifesto from the FSLN.

After a 61-hour siege, the 13 remaining hostages were freed unharmed. The guerrillas and the 14 freed political prisoners were transported by bus to Las Mercedes Airport, where they were applauded by crowds. They flew to Havana on the prepared jet, accompanied by four volunteer guarantors: Archbishop Obando y Bravo, Papal Nuncio Gabriel Montalvo, the Mexican Ambassador Joaquín Mercado Flores, and the Spanish Ambassador José García Bañón. Hundreds of Nicaraguans at the airport cheered as the plane took off.

Key released prisoners included Daniel Ortega, who would later become President of Nicaragua, and Daniel Núñez, future head of the pro-government National Union of Farmers and Ranchers. Also freed were Lenin Cerna, who would go on to head state security, and Jaime Cuadra, a future opposition activist.

== Aftermath & Legacy ==
The raid was a stunning success for the FSLN. The freed Sandinistas soon infiltrated back into Nicaragua to capitalize on their newfound prestige. Recruits poured into the movement, and the resistance against the Somoza regime intensified in earnest, until, five years later, the Somoza dynasty fell and the Sandinistas came to power.

Many participants in the raid became key figures in the new government: Leticia Herrera headed the Sandinista Defense Committees, Joaquín Cuadra became Chief of Staff of the army, and Tomás Borge became Minister of Interior. Eduardo Contreras and Germán Pomares did not live to see the takeover, killed in subsequent fighting. Former mediator Miguel Obando y Bravo later became an outspoken critic of the Sandinista government.

Anastasio Somoza Debayle was assassinated in Paraguay in 1980; in his memoirs, he had described the Christmas party commandos as "trained killers" who "had received the best training Castro has to offer."

By the 10th anniversary in December 1984, the Sandinista government portrayed the episode as a watershed moment for their revolutionary struggle. The newspaper Barricada stated it "opened a new stage in the political life of the country." Most former hostages, once eminent diplomats and statesmen, were by then in anonymous exile and scorned by the new leaders as collaborators with the old regime.

Nobel laureate Gabriel García Márquez's dramatic screenplay account of the siege became one of the most popular books in Nicaragua.
