= Elizabeth Julia Reid =

Australian journalist (1915–1971)

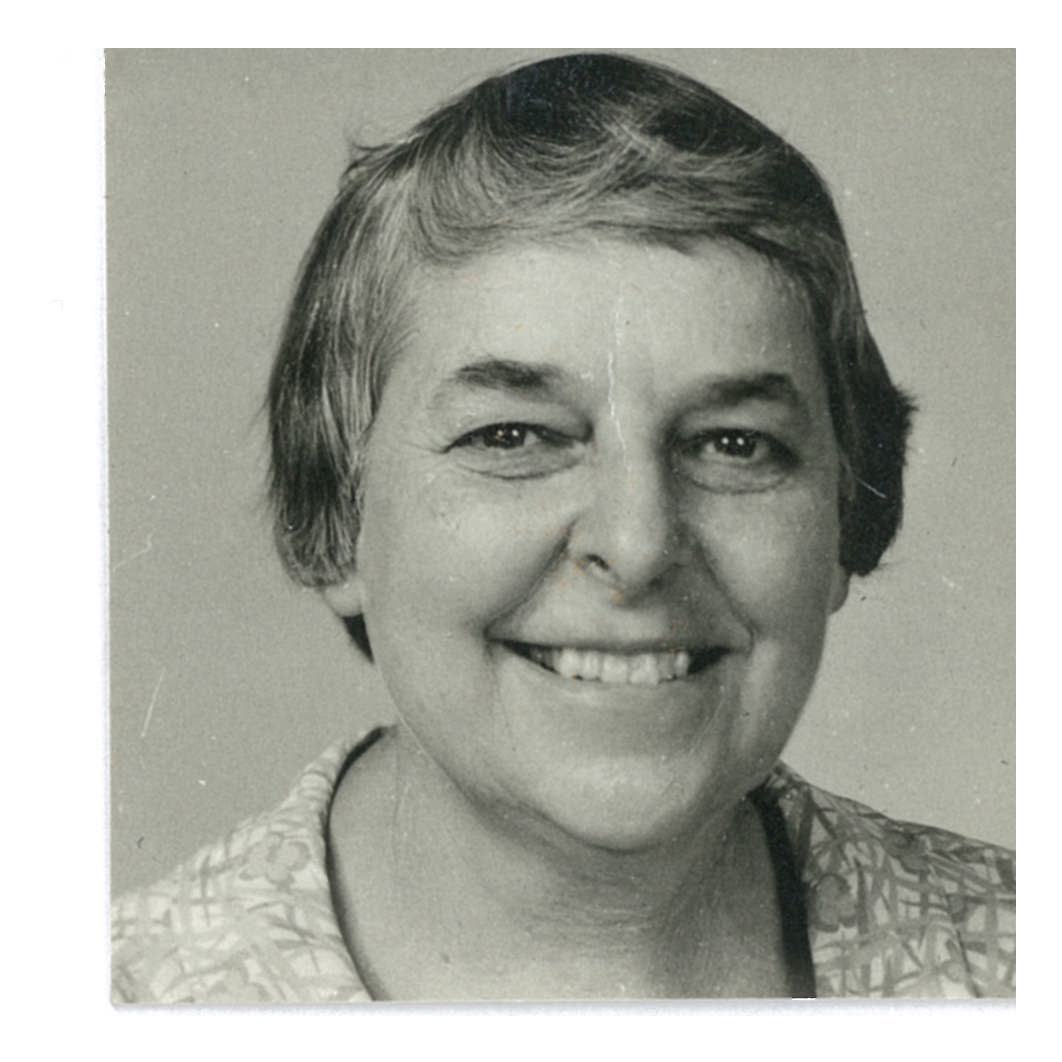
- Born: 24 February 1915; Waverley, Sydney, Australia
- Died: 23 December 1974 (aged 59); The Hague, Netherlands
- Occupations: journalist, NGO executive
- Years active: 1939–1974
- Known for: women's rights and education; Grail movement leader
- Notable work: I Belong Where I am Needed

Elizabeth Julia Reid (24 February 1915 – 23 December 1974) was an Australian journalist and a lay leader in the Grail movement for Catholic woman.

== Early life and education ==
Elizabeth Julia Reid was born on 24 February 1915, in Waverley, Sydney, New South Wales. She was the second child born to John Francis and Annie Catherine Reid. Her father was a journalist, and her father's uncle was Sir George Houstoun Reid, the fourth prime minister of Australia.

== Career ==
Reid studied to be a nurse at the Brisbane General Hospital but decided not to pursue a nursing career. She began studying with a Catholic women's organization, known as the Grail, which had been established in Australia in 1936. In 1939, she moved to Melbourne where she became more actively involved in the organization. She edited the Torchlight magazine, published by the National Catholic Girls' Movement. She also participated in the Grail's educational programs, which were offered through the Grail's centre at Tay Creggan, in Hawthorne. The Grail's educational efforts had the backing of Archbishop Daniel Mannix. As part of these educational efforts, Reid was an instructor for leadership training for girls aged 14 to 18 in the National Catholic Girls' Movement.

In 1948, Reid moved to Hong Kong, where she became a reporter for the Sunday Examiner, a weekly newspaper published by the Hong Kong Catholic diocese. She also worked as the public relations officer for Catholic Relief Services. She traveled widely through Asia for the Examiner. She also submitted articles for Catholic World News's news service in the United States, reporting on events in Asia. In 1956, she moved to New York City, to work for the U.N. affiliated International Movement for Fraternal Union of All Races and Peoples, also known as Mouvement Internationale pour l'Union Fraternelle entre les Races and les Peuples (U.F.R.P.). Reid became the permanent representative of the U.F.R.P. at the United Nations in 1956. She was a "dynamic speaker" and frequently travelled across the United States, sharing her global perspective and experience with American Catholic women.

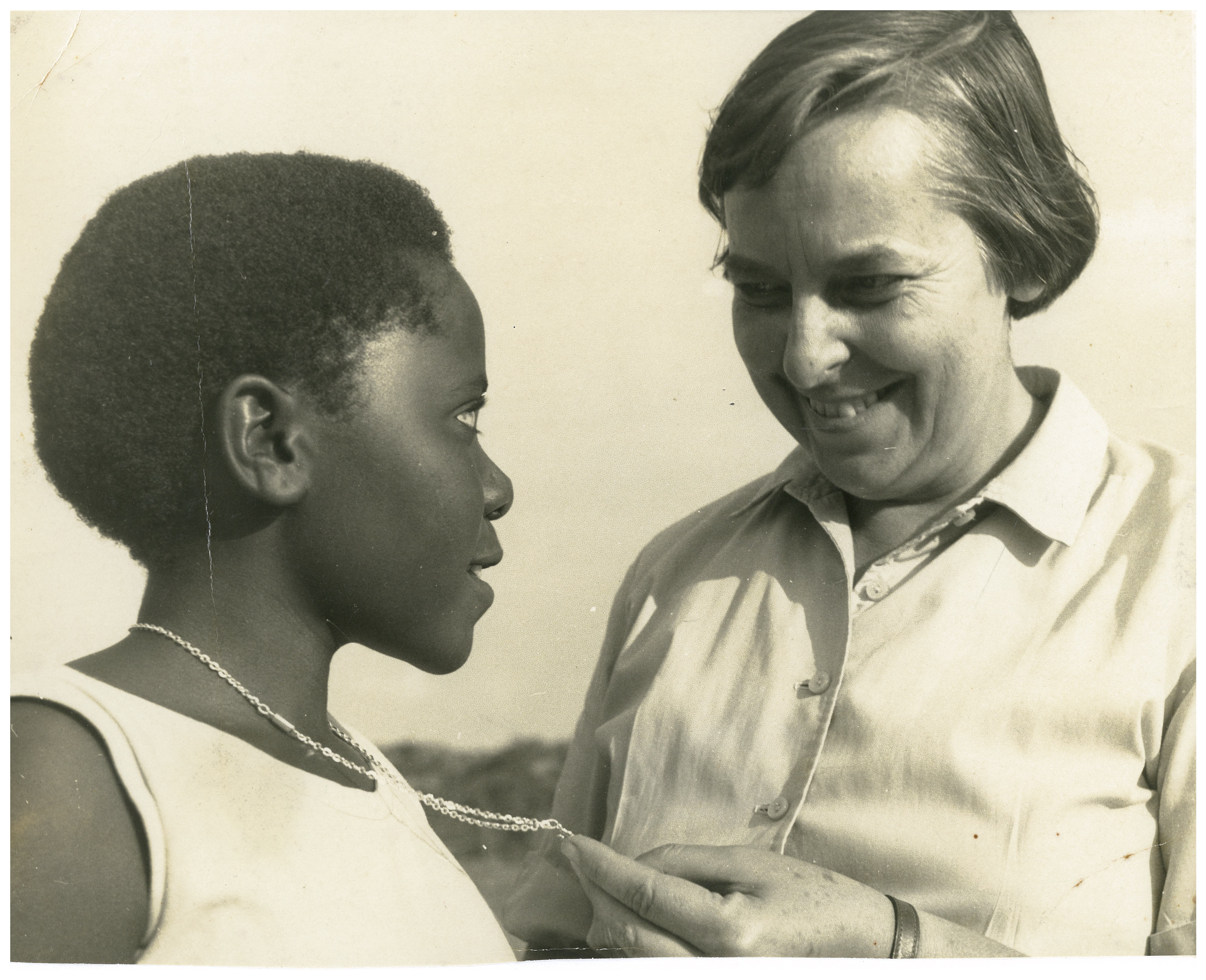
Elizabeth Reid, Grail Journalist and community development worker, admires a cross worn by a student at the Maryknoll school in Mwanza, Tanganyika.

While based in the U.S., Reid traveled to Africa on short "shuttle apostolates." She was involved in Grail projects in Botswana, Ghana, Uganda, Tanzania, and South Africa. At the request of Catholic bishops, she also offered trainings for wives of African diplomats who were being sent to appointments outside of Africa.

In 1961, she published her autobiography, entitled I belong where I am needed.

In 1966, she moved to New Delhi, India, where she led the newly formed not-for-profit organization Action for Food Production (AFPRO). AFPRO was a partnership between faith-based organizations and the government to provide technical assistance in poor rural areas. It was a time of drought in India, and the need for clean drinking water and water for irrigation for crops was acute. As executive secretary, Reid oversaw the organization's many projects. In addition, she established the Grail Mobile Extension Training Unit in India, which offered basic education for women in remote rural communities.

== Death and legacy ==
By 1974, Reid was very sick with cancer. She visited the shrine of Saint Francis Xavier in Goa, India, in December of that year, to pray for a miracle of healing. Still very ill, she decided to go to the International Grail Centre, at The Hague, Netherlands, where she lived her final days. She died on 23 December 1974.

Archbishop Angelo Innocent Fernandes, the Catholic archbishop of New Delhi from 1967 to 1990, is quoted as saying she was "a great and effective communicator of development, justice and peace."

== See also ==
- The Grail (women's movement)
