= Anne Hope (activist) =

South African anti-apartheid activist

- Born: 12 February 1920
- Died: 26 December 2015 (aged 95)
- Citizenship: South African
- Occupations: Activist, educator
- Organization: The Grail
- Known for: Popular education; anti-apartheid activism
- Notable work: Training for Transformation
- Partner: Sally Timmel

Anne Hope (12 February 1920 – 26 December 2015) was a South African activist and a member of the Catholic women's organisation The Grail (women's movement). She worked closely with Steve Biko to introduce the methods of the Brazilian educator Paulo Freire in South Africa. She met Freire at Harvard in 1969. In 1971, at the invitation of Biko, she began running workshops on Freirean methods with the South African Students' Organisation (SASO).

== Publication ==
Together with her partner Sally Timmel she wrote the four volume Freirian training manual Training for Transformation which was widely used in the United Democratic Front and other progressive anti-apartheid organisations in the 1980s.

== See also ==
- Paulo Freire
- Steve Biko
- The Grail (women's movement)
