= Robin Herman =

American writer and journalist (1951–2022)

- Born: November 24, 1951; New York City, U.S.
- Died: February 1, 2022 (aged 70); Waltham, Massachusetts, U.S.
- Education: Princeton University (BA)
- Spouse: Paul Horvitz
- Children: 2

Robin Cathy Herman (November 24, 1951 – February 1, 2022) was an American writer and journalist. She was the first female sports journalist for The New York Times.

Herman had a successful and eclectic career, ranging from sports writing to assistant dean of communications for Harvard school of Public Health, where she also taught. She also wrote about health and medicine for The Washington Post and about women's issues on Twitter and in a personal blog, and she published a book on renewable energy.

== Early life and education ==
Herman was born in New York City on November 24, 1951. She grew up in Port Washington, Long Island, New York. She was among the first class of women enrolled in Princeton University in 1969. Herman graduated with a bachelor's degree in English in 1973, a member of the first graduating class of women in Princeton history. During her time at Princeton, she was the only female staffer of The Daily Princetonian. She was initially assigned to news, but after confronting the sports editor, she covered men's rugby. She later became their first female sports editor, then a managing editor.

== Career ==
Herman became the first female sportswriter in the history of The New York Times upon graduation in 1973.

=== 1975 NHL All-Star Game ===
Herman and Marcelle St. Cyr (CKLM radio in Montreal) became the first female reporters allowed in a men's professional sports locker room on January 21, 1975, at the 1975 NHL All-Star Game in Montreal, Canada. While the Wales Conference all-star team easily beat the Campbell Conference all-star team 7–1, television cameras and other journalists instead focused on Herman's and St. Cyr's presence in the locker room, despite Herman's efforts to turn the attention back to the game.

=== Other journalism ===
Herman, the only female member of the Professional Hockey Writers Association during her sports writing career, gained access to all but four NHL team locker rooms over four years. She moved to New York political coverage for The Times for five years, until she left the paper in 1983. In 1991, she wrote for The Washington Post and covered issues relating to health and medical fields.

=== Harvard ===
In 1999, Herman was appointed as director of Harvard T.H. Chan School of Public Health's office of communications. In 2006, she became the assistant dean of communications and remained in the position for four years. She additionally co-taught a health communications course at the school.

=== Art ===
After 13 years at Harvard, Herman established a career in fine arts, painting in watercolor, acrylic and pastel.

== Political views ==
Aside from writing for the Times as a political writer for five years, Herman wrote about women's issues, including in sports, on Twitter (@girlinthelocker) and in a blog on a personal website. She started the blog in response to George W. Bush's bid for re-election in 2004. She said: "I felt that women's rights and integrity were being undermined by the Bush administration and that younger women did not realize that their standing in society was being eroded." She felt her experience as a female sports journalist and the "girl in the locker room" well represented the cause for equal opportunity in employment and other rights for women.

== Personal life ==
Herman was married to Paul Horvitz with whom she had a daughter and a son. She died of ovarian cancer at her home in Waltham, Massachusetts on February 1, 2022, at the age of 70.

== Published works ==
She wrote Fusion: The Search for Endless Energy, a history of science book published by Cambridge University Press in 1990.

== Awards and recognition ==
Herman won the Mary Garber Pioneer award, the highest honor of the Association of Women in Sports Media given in recognition of "distinguished work in the sports media industry and commitment to upholding and advancing the values of AWSM".

She is mentioned in the 2013 documentary Let Them Wear Towels. The documentary details the struggles of those women who first sought to enter the male locker rooms in various professional sports leagues. It is part of the series of documentaries produced by ESPN Films entitled Nine for IX. The series focuses on women in sports and is told through the lens of female film makers.
