= 1974 Neskaupstaður avalanches =

Avalanches in Iceland

- Date: 20 December 1974
- Location: Neskaupstaður, Iceland
- Cause: Avalanche
- Deaths: 12

The 1974 Neskaupstaður avalanches were two avalanches that struck the town of Neskaupstaður in Iceland on 20 December 1974, killing 12 people, including two children.

The first avalanche, around 400 meters wide, fell around 13:30 during the day and struck a fishing industrial site where 5 people died. Due to the bad weather, the site was mostly abandoned but the previous days over 100 people had been working in the fish factories. The second avalanche, which was around 140 meters wide, fell about 20 minutes later, hit a garage, a concrete factory and a residential house, killing 7 people. 20 hours after the avalanches fell, the last survivor, a 19-year-old boy, was found in the remains of one of the fish factories. Two were never found and were thought to have been carried by the avalanche out to sea.

== Documentary ==
In November 2017, Háski - Fjöllin rumska, a documentary about the avalanche, was premiered.
