= Grail (women's movement) =

Catholic women's organization

The Grail, also Ladies of the Grail, is a community of about a thousand women from 24 countries, representing many different cultures, backgrounds, and work situations.

== History ==
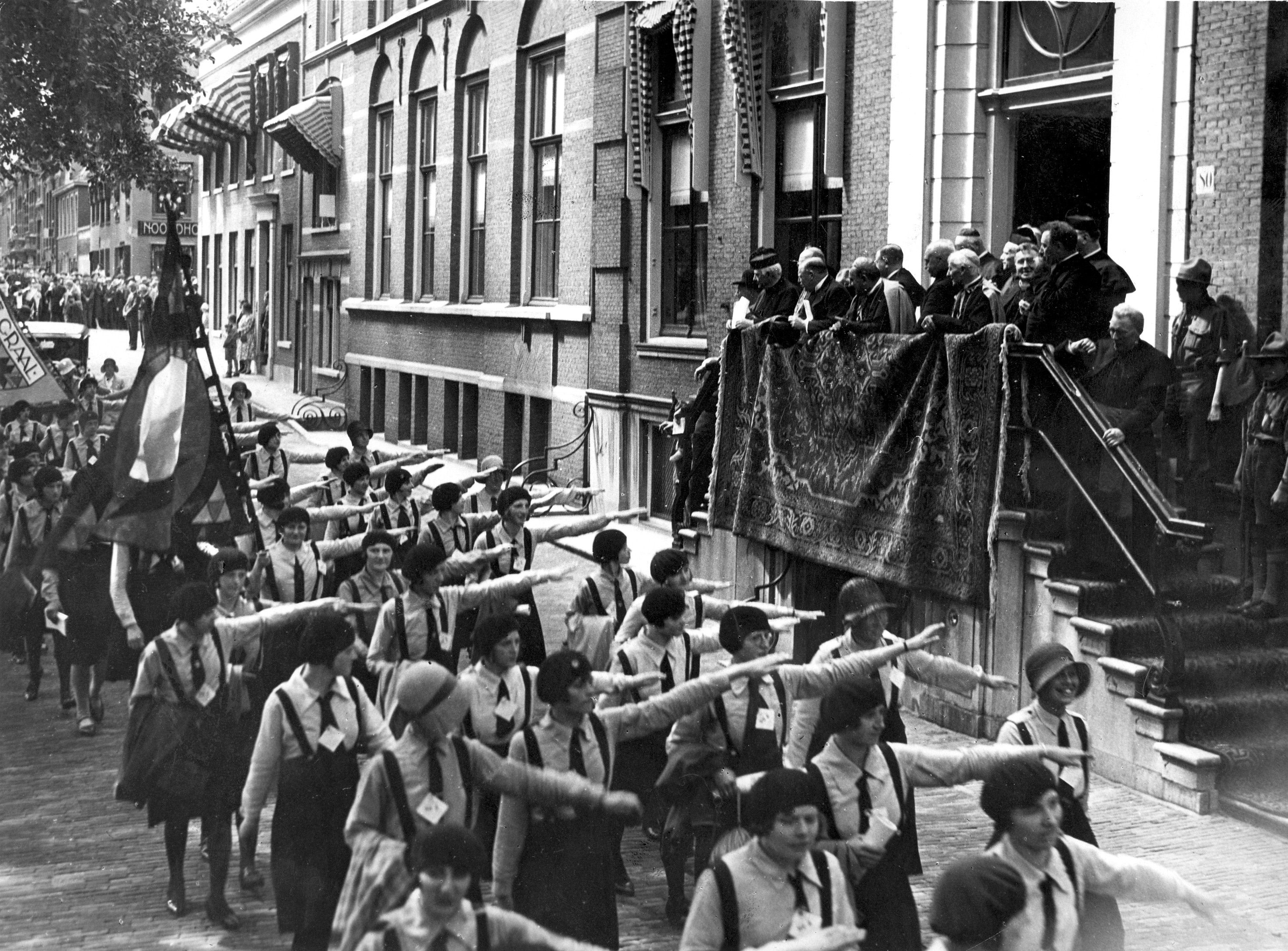
Grail members saluting the Bishop of Haarlem at his episcopal palace, 1930

The Grail was started in 1921 as the Women of Nazareth by Fr. Jacques van Ginneken, a Dutch Jesuit. He felt that many new possibilities were opening up for women and that a group of lay women, unbound by convent walls and rules, could make an immense contribution to the transformation of the world. By 1939, the Grail had become a colourful movement involving thousands of young women in the Netherlands, United Kingdom, and even Germany, challenging them to deep personal and spiritual commitment. Pioneers in Catholic feminist theology, the Grail in the United States voted in 1969 to admit women from other Christian denominations, and in 1975 to admit Jewish members.

The Grail’s national chapters began in Australia in 1936; New Zealand in the late 1930s; the United States in 1940; Brazil and South Africa in 1951, Uganda in 1953, Portugal in 1958, and subsequently in Tanzania, Ghana, Nigeria, Italy, Mexico, Canada, the Philippines, Papua New Guinea, Mozambique, Kenya, and Sweden.

Grail members are also working in Belgium, Belize, Cape Verde, Ecuador, Egypt, France, India, Indonesia, Ireland, Malaysia, Switzerland, and Zimbabwe. Its United States headquarters, known as "Grailville", is located in Loveland, Ohio.

== Significant members ==
- Anne Hope, a South African activist who worked closely with Steve Biko.

== Ecclesiastical status ==
In England, the Grail has the status of a secular institute within the Catholic Church, an association of laity making a permanent commitment to a particular form of Christian life.
