= Leticia Herrera Sánchez =

Nicaraguan politician and former guerrilla leader

Deputy of the National Assembly of Nicaragua
- In office 1985–1996

Vice President of the National Assembly of Nicaragua
- In office 1985–1990

Personal details
- Born: 11 March 1949 (age 77) Puntarenas Province, Costa Rica
- Party: Sandinista National Liberation Front
- Education: Peoples' Friendship University of Russia
- Occupation: Lawyer, politician

Leticia Herrera Sánchez (born 11 March 1949) is a Nicaraguan politician and former guerrilla leader. She was one of the first women commanders of the Sandinista National Liberation Front (FSLN) against the dictatorial government of Anastasio Somoza in Nicaragua from 1974 to 1979.

== Early years ==
Leticia Herrera was born in Puntarenas Province, Costa Rica during the exile of her father, a Nicaraguan worker and syndicalist who was persecuted during Somoza's dictatorship. She went through a large part of her primary and secondary education in Costa Rica where, at age 14, she had already formed a socialist organization at the institute where she studied.

== Militancy ==
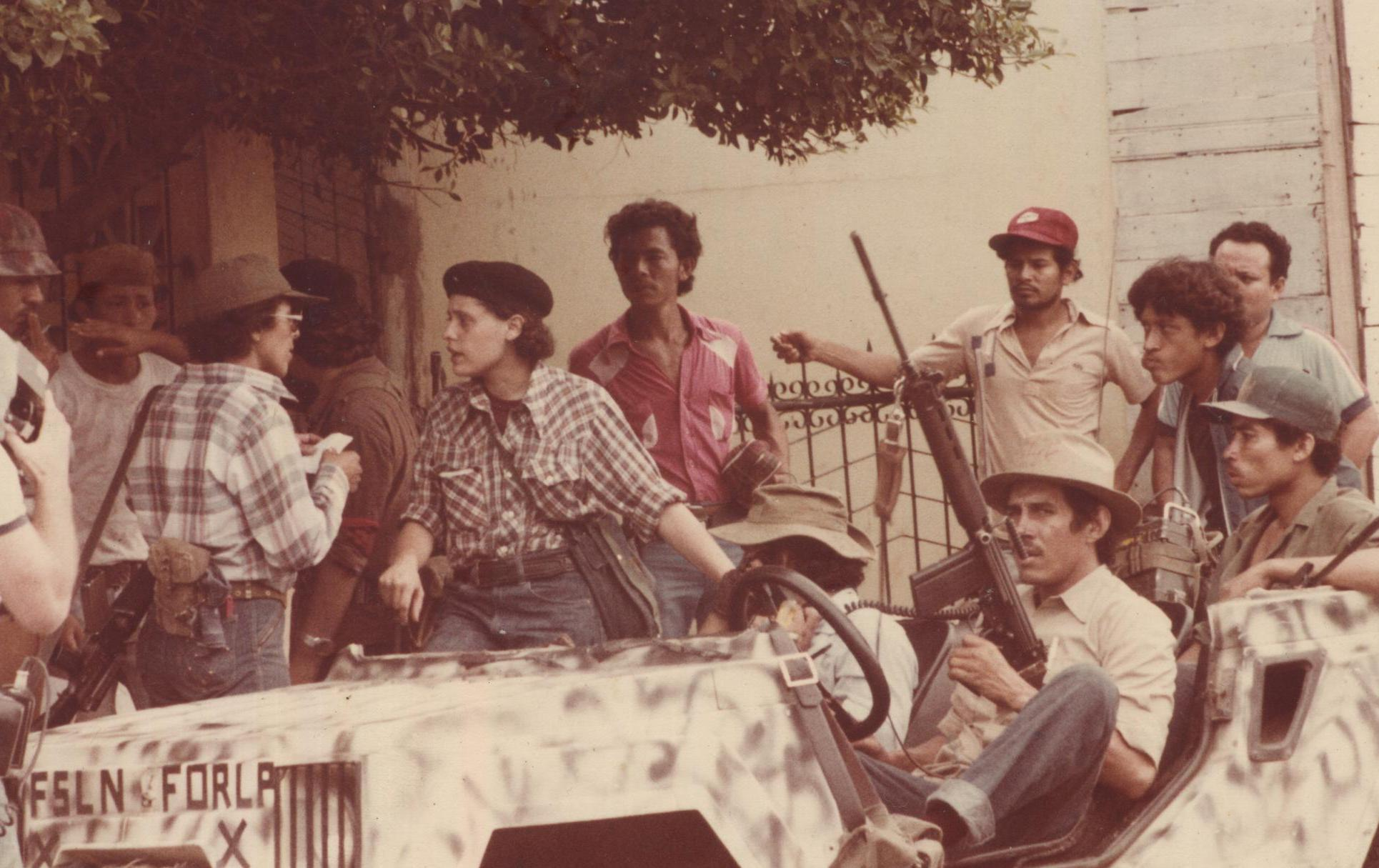
Leticia Herrera, Dora María, Fanor Urroz (Mariano), and El Gato in June 1979

Thanks to a scholarship, Herrera traveled to the USSR to study at what is now the Peoples' Friendship University of Russia in Moscow, where she graduated with a degree in law. During her time at the Soviet university, she was recruited by an FSLN cell in 1968 to join the Nicaraguan guerrilla movement.

Her participation required military training, for which she traveled to Lebanon to be instructed by the Palestine Liberation Organization. In 1970, she began her return to Nicaragua, passing through Italy, Spain, Mexico, Guatemala, and Honduras, until in 1974, she joined Juan José Quezada's command.

Once integrated into the unit, she was given the noms de guerre "Vichy" and "Miriam" in order to protect her identity.

That same year, she was one of the leaders of Operation December Victory, an assault on President Somoza's residence in which senior government officials were taken hostage. As a result of this raid, there were negotiations between the Somoza regime and the guerrilla command that led to the exchange of the officials for FSLN political prisoners. Its success was an important political victory for the FSLN, although the Sandinista Revolution would not take place until almost five years later.

Throughout her participation in the Sandinista Front, where she spent 10 years in hiding, Herrera performed multiple tasks, including being responsible for security of Daniel Ortega after his return to Managua following his release. A short time later, the politician would become the father of the second of Leticia's three children.

== Post-revolution ==
With the triumph of the FSLN, Leticia Herrera was removed from military work and reassigned to carry out literacy and health campaigns of the new regime, aimed at reducing infant and maternal mortality in Nicaragua.

From 1985 to 1996, she was a deputy of the National Assembly of Nicaragua, and was its vice president from 1985 to 1990. She was head of the Sandinista Defense Committee, where she worked with regions, communities, and municipalities to develop brigades for health, literacy, and revolutionary vigilance.

In 2007, she was appointed by Ortega's government as consul of Nicaragua in Costa Rica, and was appointed consul in Panama in 2010.

She was head of the Directorate of Alternate Conflict Resolution (DiRAC) until her dismissal in 2014.

== Works ==
- Guerrillera, mujer y comandante de la Revolución sandinista, memorias de Leticia Herrera (2013), Icaria, ISBN 9788498884944. A book in which the Nicaraguan offers her testimony and that of her companions about the transcendental role played by women in the armed conflict from a gender perspective.
