= Ellen Deborah Ellis =

American Professor

- Born: November 25, 1878; Philadelphia, Pennsylvania
- Died: December 20, 1974 (aged 96); Wallingford, Pennsylvania
- Education: Bryn Mawr College (PhD)
- Parents: Henry D. Ellis (father); Ellen D. Moore (mother)

Ellen Deborah Ellis (1878 – 1974) was an American Professor of history and political science. She founded the political science department at Mount Holyoke College and was named its first chairman.

== Biography ==
Ellen Deborah Ellis was born in Philadelphia, Pennsylvania, daughter of Henry D. Ellis and Ellen D. née Moore. She was educated in Philadelphia public schools before matriculating to Bryn Mawr College from the Philadelphia High School for Girls. During 1897–1898 she held the First Bryn Mawr Matriculation Scholarship for the Middle and Southern States, then the Philadelphia Girls' High and Normal Schools Alumnae Scholarship from 1897 to 1901. She graduated with an A.B. in 1901, then returned to attend graduate school at the same institution. She spent 1902–3 at the University of Leipzig as a Bryn Mawr College European fellow studying economics and history, and received an A.M. from Bryn Mawr College in 1903. During 1904–5 she was a resident fellow in economics and history at Bryn Mawr. Ellis was awarded a PhD from Bryn Mawr College with a dissertation titled, An Introduction to the History of Sugar as a Commodity.

Beginning in 1905, she was hired as an instructor of economics and political Science at Mount Holyoke College in Massachusetts. She became associate professor of history at the college in 1908, and was acting head of the department of history through 1912. During 1913–1914, she took a leave of absence to teach at Constantinople College in Turkey, where she served as head of the History Department. Returning to Mount Holyoke College, she was named professor of political science in 1919. In 1939, she founded the political science department at Mount Holyoke College and was named its first chairman. Ellis retired in 1944, but continued to teach at Holyoke Junior College. In the period 1946–47, she was acting librarian at Istanbul Women's College. During 1958–59 she would return to teach at Mount Holyoke College as Professor Emeritus. During her career she wrote a number of articles for different journals and magazines.

== Bibliography ==
Her published works include:

- Ellis, ED (1905), An Introduction to the History of Sugar as a Commodity: A Dissertation Presented to the Faculty of Bryn Mawr College for the Degree of Doctor of Philosophy, Philadelphia: John C. Winston Company.
- Ellis, ED (August 1920), "The Pluralistic State", American Political Science Review, 14 (3): 393–407, doi:10.2307/1946259, JSTOR 1946259.
- Ellis, ED (November 1923), "Guild Socialism and Pluralism", American Political Science Review, 17 (4): 584–596, doi:10.2307/1943758, JSTOR 1943758.
- Ellis, ED (April 1926), "The city manager as a leader of policy", National Municipal Review, 15 (4): 201–204, doi:10.1002/ncr.4110150405.
- Ellis, ED (November 1927), "Political Science at the Crossroads", American Political Science Review, 21 (4): 773–791, doi:10.2307/1947593, JSTOR 1947593.
- Ellis, ED (February 1935), "National Parties and Local Politics", American Political Science Review, 29 (1): 60–67, doi:10.2307/1947166, JSTOR 1947166.
- Ellis, ED (October 1945), "The Atomic Bomb – The Key to International Sanction", Current History, 9 (50): 293.
- Ellis, ED (December 1947), "The Evolution of Turkish Political Institutions", Current History, 13 (76): 347.
- Ellis, ED (November 1, 1950), "Turkey Looks Toward the West", Current History, 19 (111): 282.
- Ellis, ED (August 1951), "Crisis in American Government", Current History, 21 (120): 65.
- Ellis, ED (April 1952), "The Two-Party System in the Crucible? Great Britain", Current History, 22 (128): 200.
- Ellis, ED (May 1955), "French Politics and World Affairs", Current History, 28 (165): 257.
- Ellis, ED (February 1959), "Turkish Nationalism in the Postwar World", Current History, 36 (210): 86.
