= Walter H. Wheeler Jr. =

American businessperson and sailor (1897–1974)

Walter H. Wheeler Jr. (1897 – December 11, 1974) was an American businessperson and sailor.

== Biography ==
Wheeler was born in New York in 1897. In 1918, at the age of 19, he earned the Croix de Guerre with the U.S. Ambulance Corps in Paris. A year later, he received the Navy Cross for service as a submarine chaser. At Harvard University, he led the football team as captain. During WWII, he worked in various roles with the War Production Board.

Wheeler joined Pitney-Bowes in 1919 and served as its president from 1938 to 1960. He later became chairman, a role he held until his retirement in 1973. Under his tenure, the company achieved revenues of $384.9 million by 1973. He oversaw the introduction of the first mass-market postage meter, and developments in mail processing equipment adopted by the United States Postal Service. He also held positions as honorary chairman and director emeritus.

As a sailor, Wheeler navigated his yawl, Cotton Blossom IV, across the Atlantic. He held memberships in several organizations, including the U.S. Chamber of Commerce.
