= April 1950 =

Month of 1950

<<	April 1950					>>
Su	Mo	Tu	We	Th	Fr	Sa
						1
2	3	4	5	6	7	8
9	10	11	12	13	14	15
16	17	18	19	20	21	22
23	24	25	26	27	28	29
30

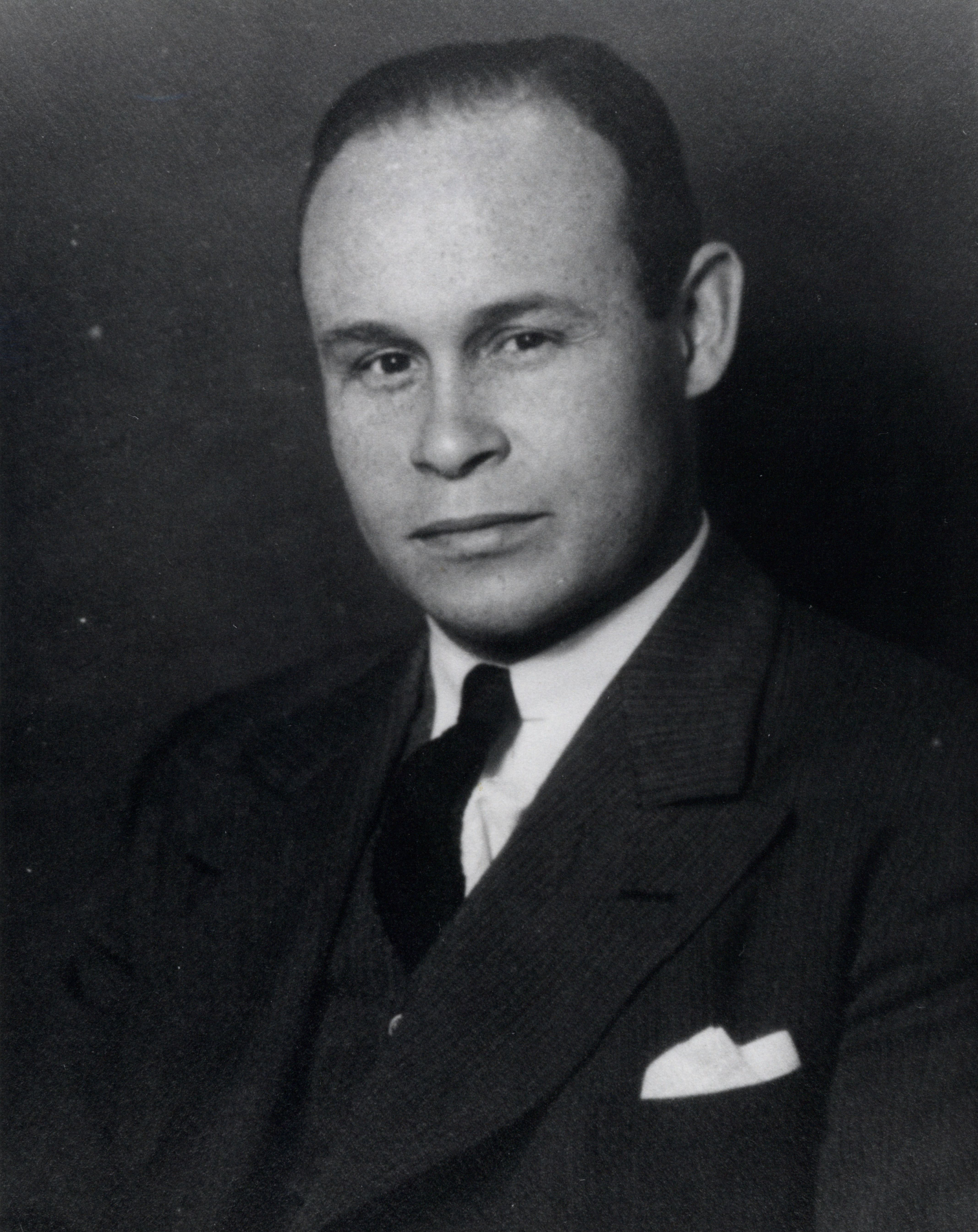
April 1, 1950: Dr. Charles R. Drew, African-American pioneer and subject of urban legend, killed in auto accident

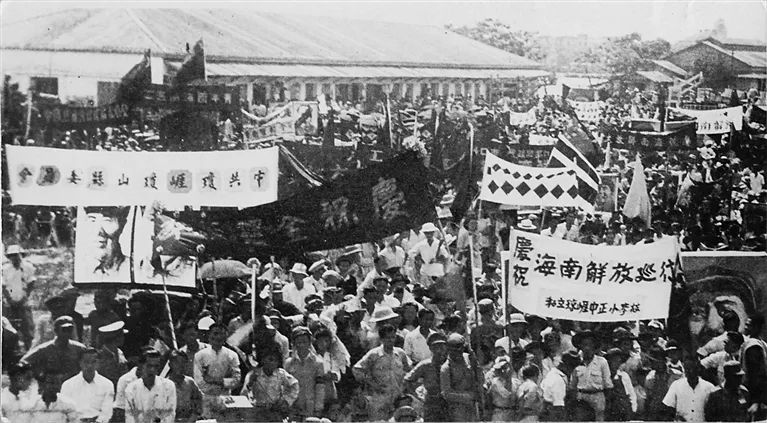
April 22, 1950: Communist China seizes Hainan Island, cuts Nationalist China in half

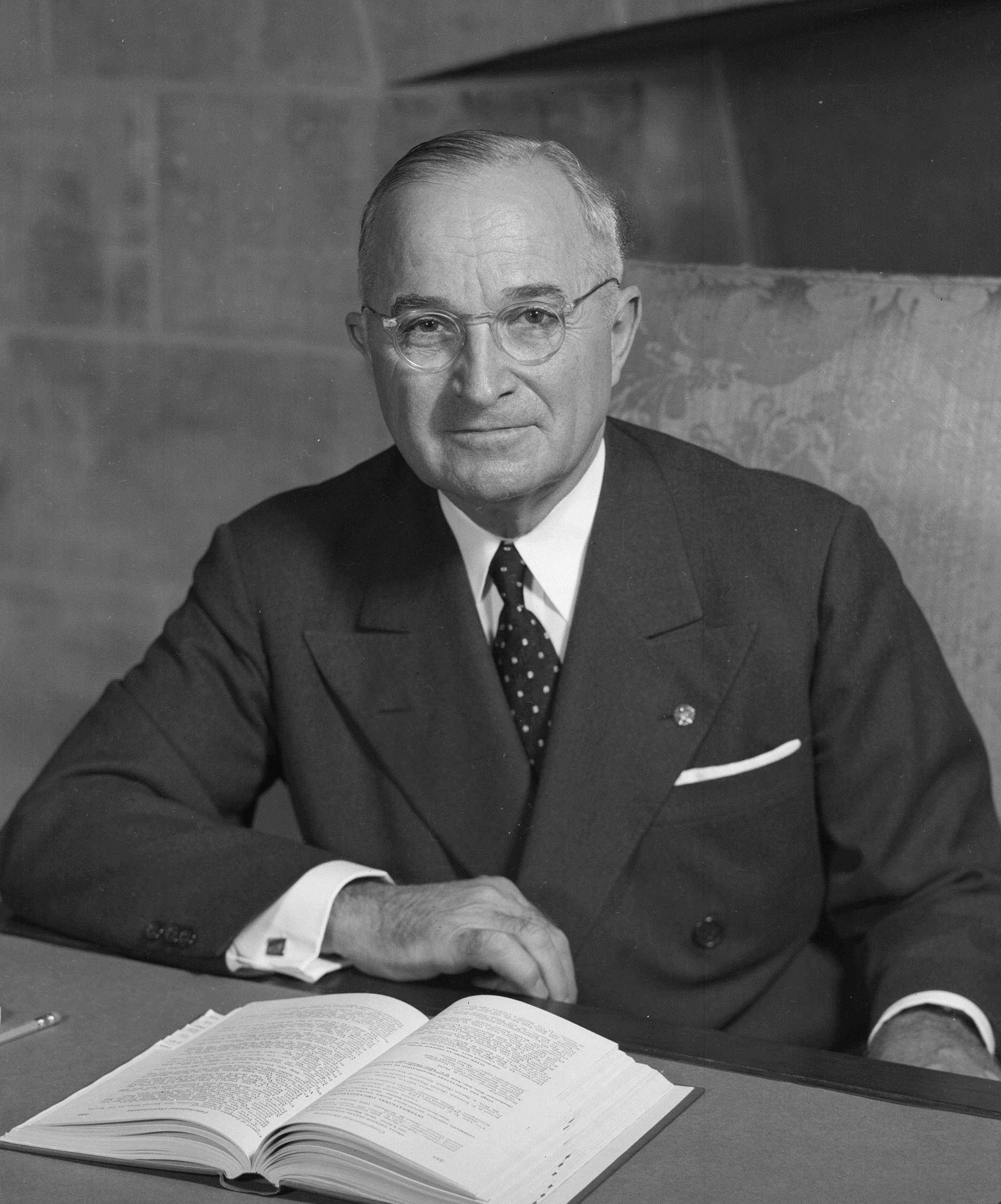
April 16, 1950: U.S. President Truman privately decides not to run for re-election

The following events occurred in April 1950:

== April 1, 1950 (Saturday) ==
- The 1950 United States census was taken. After seven months of tabulation, the population on that day was announced to have been 150,697,361. The population sixty years later (April 1, 2010) would be more than doubled, at 308,745,538.
- Owen Lattimore, who had been stationed in Afghanistan when Senator Joe McCarthy accused him of being a Soviet agent within the U.S. State Department, returned to the United States to confront the charges.
- Theodore Donay, a German-born American who had previously been convicted of treason for helping a German bomber pilot escape during World War II, vanished while under investigation by the FBI. Donay rented a motorboat at California's Santa Catalina Island, then abandoned it. Hours later, a foreign submarine was sighted off of Point Arguello. Officials learned that Donay had killed himself, finding a suicide note.
- Cambridge defeated Oxford in the 96th Boat Race.
- Born: Samuel Alito, Associate Justice of the Supreme Court since 2006, in Trenton, New Jersey
- Died:
  - Charles R. Drew, 45, African-American surgeon, who pioneered preservation techniques for use in blood banks, following an automobile accident. An urban legend arose that Drew, whose work had saved so many lives, died because he was turned away from the nearest hospital because of his race. In reality, Drew and the other three passengers in his car were taken to the Alamance General Hospital in Burlington, North Carolina, but physicians were unable to save him.
  - F.O. Matthiessen, 48, American historian and literary critic, jumped to his death from the 12th story of a Boston hotel.

== April 2, 1950 (Sunday) ==
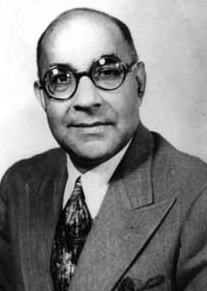
Pakistan's Ali Khan

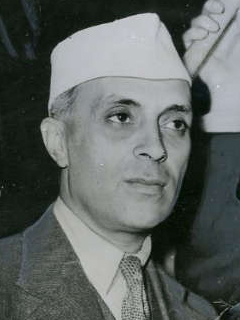
India's Nehru

- Pakistan's Prime Minister Liaquat Ali Khan arrived in Delhi as the guest of India's Prime Minister Jawaharlal Nehru for the first summit meeting between the two since the partition of British India into predominantly Muslim Pakistan and predominantly Hindu India. The meeting came in the wake of anti-Hindu violence in Pakistan and anti-Muslim violence in India, and would result in a pact between the two leaders to punish anti-religious violence against religious minorities.
- Born: Melba Boyd, African American poet, in Detroit.
- Died:
  - Jean George Auriol, 43, French film critic and screenwriter, was killed in an automobile accident
  - Recep Peker, 61, Prime Minister of Turkey 1946–1947

== April 3, 1950 (Monday) ==
- The standard ratio for the dimensions of television receivers was set at 4:3 (with the length of the screen being 4/3 of the height) after originally having been 5:4, and that would remain the standard for nearly half a century. With the advent of digital television, the ratio would be changed to the wider 16:9 dimensions.
- Worlds in Collision, by Immanuel Velikovsky, was published for the first time, as a book by Macmillan Publishing.
- Born:
  - Sally Thomsett, English actress, in Sussex
  - David Fulmer, American author, in Northumberland, Pennsylvania.
- Died:
  - Kurt Weill, 50, German-born composer
  - Carter G. Woodson, 74, African-American educator referred to as "The Father of Black History"

== April 4, 1950 (Tuesday) ==
- A Gallup Poll was released showing that 37 percent of the Republicans surveyed were in favor of former General and World War II hero, Dwight D. Eisenhower, to be the party's nominee in the 1952 U.S. presidential election, compared to 17% for Robert A. Taft, 15% for Thomas E. Dewey, and 12% for Harold Stassen. In addition, 33 percent of independent voters said that they would vote for Eisenhower if he ran in 1952, a better showing than any potential Republican nominee had had in more than 20 years.
- The United States Navy issued a statement that it had seen evidence of "two or three probable foreign subs" off of Cape Mendocino in northern California, responding to reports of sightings of what were believed to be Soviet submarines in American territorial waters.
- The United Nations Trusteeship Council passed the "Statute on Jerusalem, declaring that the city should be considered international territory and a demilitarized zone. Neither Israel, which had control of West Jerusalem, or Jordan, which had East Jerusalem, agreed to let the United Nations send forces into the Holy City.
- Born:
  - Christine Lahti, American actress (Chicago Hope), in Birmingham, Michigan
  - Charles Bernstein, American poet, in New York City

== April 5, 1950 (Wednesday) ==
- In what has been described as "[a]rguably the most famous dinner party in the annals of twentieth-century science", American physicist James Van Allen hosted a group of scientists in honor of visiting British geophysicist Sydney Chapman. At the gathering, Lloyd Berkner proposed a worldwide series of atmospheric observations starting seven years in the future, in 1957, a concept that was endorsed by the persons present and which would become the International Geophysical Year.
- Born:
  - Agnetha Fältskog, Swedish pop musician and songwriter (ABBA); in Jönköping
  - Harpo, Swedish pop musician, as Jan Harpo Svensson; in Bandhagen
  - Louise Dolan, American physicist and superstring theoretician; in Wilmington, Delaware
  - Franklin Chang-Díaz, Costa Rican native and American astronaut; in San José
- Died: Charles Binaggio, Kansas City crime boss and political leader, in a "gangland execution"

== April 6, 1950 (Thursday) ==
- A train fell off of a bridge at Tanguá in Brazil, killing 110 people, mostly persons who were on a vacation trip during the Easter holiday. The Leopoldina Railway train had left Rio de Janeiro and was on its way to Vitória when the locomotive and the first five cars derailed and plunged into a flood-swollen river below.
- In Great Britain, any person born on or after April 6, 1950, and who qualifies for a UK State Pension at age 65, may have their civil partner draw a pension as well.
- Dr. Charles P. Bailey, an American heart surgeon in Philadelphia, made the first successful human test of an instrument to dilate the aortic valve.

== April 7, 1950 (Friday) ==
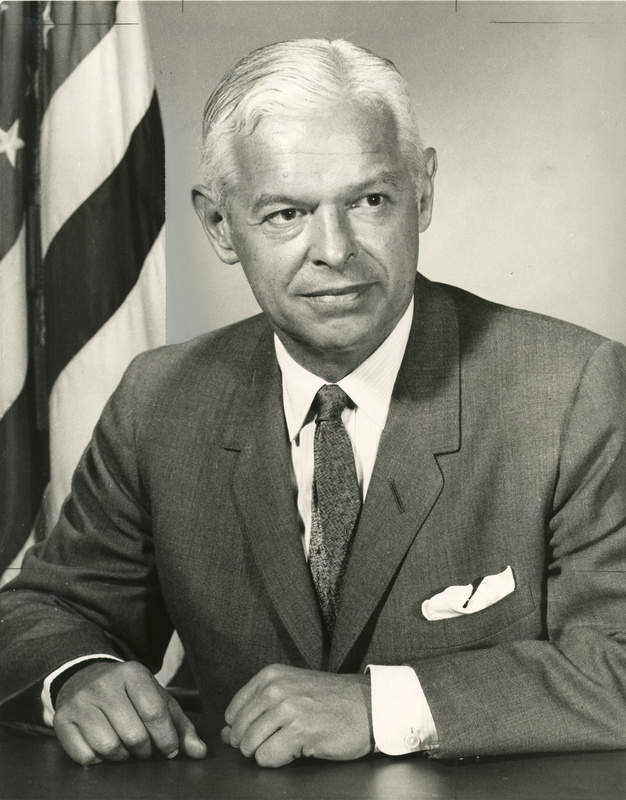
Nitze of the NSC

- NSC 68, authored by Paul Nitze and entitled "United States Objectives and Programs for National Security", was issued by U.S. President Truman's National Security Council. The document, classified top secret until February 27, 1975, guided American foreign policy during the Truman years. Describing the "essential purpose of the United States" as being "to assure the integrity and vitality of our free society", and the "fundamental design of the Kremlin" as "the complete subversion or forcible destruction of the machinery of government and structure of society in the countries of the non-Soviet world", NSC 68 concluded that "we must, by means of a rapid and sustained build-up of the political, economic and military strength of the free world... frustrate the Kremlin design of a world dominated by its will."

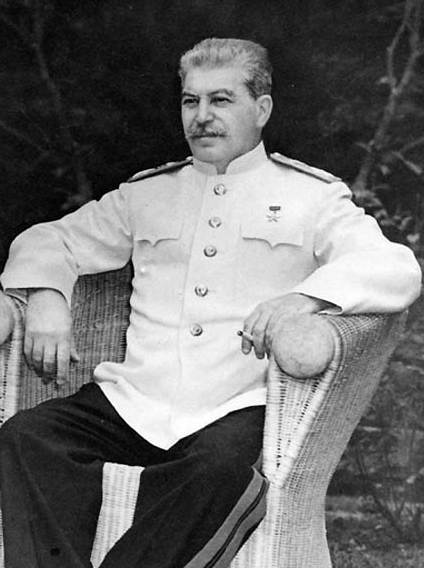
Stalin of the USSR

- The Soviet Union instituted a new five member executive council known as the Bureau of the Presidium consisting of Premier Josef Stalin, First Deputy Nikolai Bulganin, and Deputies Lavrentiy Beria, Vyacheslav Molotov, and Lazar Kaganovich. Georgy Malenkov was added a week later to the group.;
- Died: Walter Huston, 67, Canadian-born American film actor

== April 8, 1950 (Saturday) ==
- In the first shootdown of an American military aircraft by the Soviet Union during the Cold War, two Soviet Lavochkin La-11 fighters intercepted and downed a U.S. Navy PB4Y-2 Privateer surveillance plane that was flying over or near the Latvian SSR with ten men on board, the first of over 350 American servicemen lost in Cold War missions.
- Researchers at the Massachusetts Institute of Technology showed the first photograph demonstrating the appearance of an atom, using x-rays to simulate a pattern of iron and sulphur atoms, within the mineral marcasite, magnified more than 10,000,000 times.
- Born: Grzegorz Lato, Polish soccer football star, in Malbork
- Died: Vaslav Nijinsky, 61, Russian ballet dancer and choreographer

== April 9, 1950 (Sunday) ==
- Biochemists Thomas H. Jukes and Robert Stokstad of Lederle Laboratories announced their accidental discovery of the increased production that resulted from antibiotics mixed into animal feed. Mixing an antibiotic into feed at 1 part per 400 (five pounds into one ton) increased the growth rate in piglets by 50 percent, and at a lesser rate in chicks and calves, leading to a practice that would become widespread in animal husbandry.
- The "Notre-Dame Affair" took place during nationally televised Easter High Mass services at the Notre-Dame Cathedral in Paris, when members of the Lettrism movement chose a quiet moment for Michel Mourre to deliver a "blasphemous anti-sermon" that ended with "We proclaim the death of the Christ-God, so that Man may live at last." The church organist began playing music as loudly as possible to drown out the speech after Mourre had declared, "En vérité je vous le dis: Dieu est mort" ("Verily, I say unto you: God is dead")
- Born: Pierre Gagnaire, French chef and restauranteur; in Apinac, Loire département

== April 10, 1950 (Monday) ==
- By a 6–2 vote, the United States Supreme Court declined to grant certiorari for an appeal of the contempt of Congress convictions of the "Hollywood Ten", who had refused in 1947 to testify before the House Un-American Activities Committee.
- The musical racetrack film Riding High directed by Frank Capra and starring Bing Crosby premiered at the Paramount Theater in New York City.
- Born:
  - Ken Griffey, Sr., American baseball player, in Donora, Pennsylvania
  - Eddie Hazel, American rock guitarist, in Brooklyn (d. 1992)

== April 11, 1950 (Tuesday) ==
- The 30-year Sino-Soviet Treaty of Friendship, Alliance and Mutual Assistance, signed on February 14, 1950, formally went into force, providing that the People's Republic of China and the Soviet Union would defend each other in the event of an invasion; the treaty included a stipulation that the treaty would be automatically extended if neither side annulled it before April 11, 1979.
- The first elections in Jordan to include the Palestinian Arab voters from the soon-to-be-annexed West Bank were conducted. The united parliament had 40 representatives, with 20 from the east and west sides of the Jordan River.
- Died: Bainbridge Colby, 80, U.S. Secretary of State 1920–1921

== April 12, 1950 (Wednesday) ==
- Sa`id al-Mufti was appointed as the Prime Minister of Jordan.
- Born: David Cassidy, American actor and singer, in New York City (d. 2017)

== April 13, 1950 (Thursday) ==
- The Marriage Law of the People's Republic of China was promulgated, to take effect on May 1, and outlawed traditional marriage practices that had been imposed on Chinese women and children for centuries. Among the customs that were banned were the arranged marriage, the dowry, the bride price, child marriage and child betrothal, bigamy, and barriers to the remarriage of widowed women. The new rules, which were zealously enforced by the Communist Party, also guaranteed women the right to own land and to file for divorce.
- The Arab Collective Security Treaty was signed in Cairo by the seven nations of the Arab League (Egypt, Iraq, Jordan, Lebanon, Saudi Arabia, Syria and Yemen) with the members agreeing that an attack on one member would be considered an attack on all.
- Born: Ron Perlman, American film and TV actor (Hellboy), in New York City

== April 14, 1950 (Friday) ==
- The influential British comic book The Eagle was launched.
- Archbishop Stefan Wyszyński and the other bishops of the Polish Episcopal Conference (Adam Stefan Sapieha and Zygmunt Choromański) signed an accord with the Government of Poland, independently of the Vatican, with church and state pledging not to interfere with the other.
- The National Security Council presented a revised version of NSC-68 to President Truman.
- Born: Francis Collins, American geneticist, Director of the National Institutes of Health, and former leader of the Human Genome Project; in Staunton, Virginia
- Died:
  - Ramana Maharshi, 70, Hindu spiritual leader
  - Frances Seymour Fonda, 44, the estranged wife of actor Henry Fonda, and mother of future actors Jane Fonda and Peter Fonda, committed suicide by cutting her throat. She left a note that ended with the words, "I am sorry, but this is the best way out." Mr. and Mrs. Fonda had been considering a divorce since December, though no action had been filed. That evening, Henry Fonda appeared as scheduled for the Broadway performance of the title role in the play Mr. Roberts.

== April 15, 1950 (Saturday) ==
- General Nicolas Plastiras became the new Prime Minister of Greece, a day after the resignation of Sophocles Venizelos and the entire cabinet. The action came two weeks after U.S. Ambassador to Greece Henry F. Grady had written a letter to Prime Minister Plastiras and released it to the press the same day, implying that American aid would be halted if an "efficient government" could not be formed.
- The Red River of the North overflowed its banks and flooded 640 square miles of farmland in Canada's Manitoba province, forcing the largest evacuation- 100,000 people -in the Dominion's history up to that time.
- President Truman vetoed the Kerr Natural Gas Bill, which would have exempted American natural gas producers from federal regulation.
- King Leopold III offered to temporarily surrender his powers to his 19-year-old son, Prince Baudouin, in an effort to stop the crisis that followed his plans to return from exile. His radio address to his subjects, in both French and Flemish, marked the first time since 1940 that he had been heard on Belgian radio.
- "If I Knew You Were Comin' (I'd've Baked a Cake)" by Eileen Barton hit #1 on the Billboard Best Sellers in Stores chart.

== April 16, 1950 (Sunday) ==
- Communist China began an attack on the island of Hainan, occupied by the Nationalist Chinese. Hainan, which had over 2,000,000 residents and was almost as large, geographically, as the island of Taiwan, would fall to the Communists by the end of the month.
- U.S. President Harry Truman made the decision not to run for re-election in 1952, but would not tell his advisers until November 1951, and would not make the announcement public until April 1952.
- The McLean House at Appomattox, Virginia, where the American Civil War ended on April 9, 1865, with the surrender of Confederate General Robert E. Lee to U.S. General Ulysses S. Grant, was opened to the public after years of restoration. Retired U.S. Army Major General Ulysses S. Grant III, the grandson of the Union commander, participated with Lee's great-grandson, 25-year-old Robert E. Lee IV of San Francisco in the ribbon-cutting ceremony.

== April 17, 1950 (Monday) ==
- A California man placed a time bomb into the luggage of a United Airlines flight departing from Los Angeles to San Diego with 16 people on board, including the man's wife and two children. John Henry Grant, an aeronautical engineer, had instructed his wife to take out flight insurance, then placed a five-gallon gasoline bomb into her luggage. A baggage handler set off the bomb prematurely when he dropped the suitcase on loading it, but was not seriously injured. At the same time, Grant had a change of heart and told airport officials not to let the Douglas DC-3 airplane take off. Grant would be convicted of attempted murder in August.
- The "First National Congress of the Khmer Resistance" met at the Cambodian city of Kompong Som, with 200 delegates, over half of whom were Buddhist monks, and advisers from the Communist Viet Minh movement from neighboring Vietnam. After three days, the delegates formed the United Issarak Front to fight the French colonial government. Exactly 25 years later, on April 17, 1975, the Communist Khmer Rouge would succeed in taking complete control of Cambodia.

== April 18, 1950 (Tuesday) ==
- U.S. Postmaster General Jesse M. Donaldson issued cost-cutting measures, bringing an end to the long time practice of letter carriers making two deliveries per day, and limiting the carriers to an 8-hour day.
- The Avro Canada C102 Jetliner became the first jet airplane to transport airmail in North America, flying from Toronto to New York City in less than an hour, and half the time of a propeller driven airplane.
- Billy Martin, controversial as a baseball player and later as a baseball manager, made his Major League Baseball debut, getting hits in both of his at bats, and scoring a run for the New York Yankees in a 15–10 win over the Boston Red Sox.
- Vin Scully made his first broadcast as an announcer for the Brooklyn Dodgers. In 2016, Scully retired after 67 consecutive seasons as the team's announcer.

== April 19, 1950 (Wednesday) ==
- The governments of the Soviet Union and the People's Republic of China concluded their first trade agreement.
- The Navajo-Hopi Rehabilitation Act was signed into law by President Truman, with $88,700,000 to fund "a long-range program that would hasten the day that federal assistance for Indians could be withdrawn".
- Born: Lani Guinier, African-American legal scholar, in New York City (d. 2022)
- Died:
  - Former Soviet generals E.A. Egorov, 58; I.G. Bessonov, 45; A.Z. Naumov, 58; A.E. Budykho, 56; S.A. Khudiakov, 48; and M.V. Bogdanov, 52. The six, who had deserted to Germany during World War II, were each tried, convicted, and executed by a gunshot to the back of the head on the same day.
  - Lord Berners (Gerald Tyrwhitt-Wilson), 66, British composer

== April 20, 1950 (Thursday) ==
- U.S. Director of Central Intelligence Roscoe H. Hillenkoetter authorized the CIA to begin Project BLUEBIRD, with the objective of mind control research, summarized as discovering methods of "conditioning personnel to prevent unauthorized extraction of information", "control of an individual by the application of special interrogation techniques", "memory enhancement" and "preventing hostile control of Agency personnel".
- The American freighter California Bear collided with the Chinese ship Sinan off of Taku sandbar in the Yellow Sea, with 70 Chinese sailors drowning when the ship went down.
- Born: Steve Erickson, American novelist, in Santa Monica, California

== April 21, 1950 (Friday) ==
- In the city of Nainital, now part of in India's Uttarakhand state, a drunken Gurkha soldier fatally stabbed 22 people who were members of the Harijan caste, formerly classified as "untouchable". The perpetrator, armed with a machete, was outraged when the Harijan moneylender chose to marry a bride from the Brahmin caste, highest in India's caste system.
- The Northgate Center opened as the first suburban shopping mall in the United States, outside of Seattle, Washington. Originally an open air complex where the stores faced each other, Northgate began adding a roof over the concourse in 1962 and was completely enclosed by 1974.
- The Soviet Union announced that it had completed the process of repatriation of Japanese prisoners of war captured during World War II, but that it intended to keep 1,487 as war criminals, and send another 971 to the People's Republic of China to face trial there.
- Tjokorde Gde Rake Soekwati, the President of East Indonesia, announced that his breakaway nation would incorporate itself into the United States of Indonesia as long as the Republic of Indonesia would do the same.

== April 22, 1950 (Saturday) ==
- Communist Chinese forces captured Hainan Island from Taiwan and its Nationalist Chinese government. The fall of Hainan, with had almost the same land area as the island of Taiwan, cut the remaining territory of Nationalist China almost by half.
- Born:
  - Peter Frampton, English rock musician, in Bromley
  - Natsagiin Bagabandi, President of Mongolia 1997–2005, in Zavkhan Province
- Died: Charles Hamilton Houston, 54, African-American lawyer and civil rights activist, known as "The Man Who Killed Jim Crow".

== April 23, 1950 (Sunday) ==
- In one of the most closely matched Stanley Cup Finals finals in National Hockey League history, the New York Rangers and the Detroit Red Wings faced each other in Game 7. The Rangers had won Game 4 and Game 5 in overtime, and the teams were tied 3–3 at the end of regulation in the deciding match, and at the end of the first overtime. The Red Wings won in double overtime, 4–3, on a goal by Pete Babando, who had made only six goals during the regular season.
- In the 1950 NBA Finals: The Minneapolis Lakers (now the Los Angeles Lakers) defeated the Syracuse Nationals (now the Philadelphia 76ers), 110–95, to win the National Basketball Association championship, 4 games to 2.
- Born: Reggie Leach, Canadian NHL player known as "The Riverton Rifle"; 1975–76 NHL goals leader and Conn Smythe Trophy winner; in Riverton, Manitoba
- Died: William Alexander, 60, American college football and basketball coach for Georgia Tech, and inductee to College Football Hall of Fame

== April 24, 1950 (Monday) ==
- Jordan formally annexed the West Bank, and made the area's Palestinian residents citizens of the kingdom, in a resolution approved unanimously by the new Parliament and signed by King Abdullah; the annexation was recognized only by the United Kingdom and by Pakistan. On June 6, 1967, Israel would capture the West Bank from Jordan during the Six-Day War and would create a unified Jerusalem city government on June 28. Formal annexation of east Jerusalem would take place 13 years later on June 30, 1980.
- Árpád Szakasits, the head of state of the Hungarian People's Republic as Chairman of the Presidential Council, and the nation's former president, was arrested on charges of corruption. He would be sentenced to life in prison, but then would be released in 1956 during the Hungarian Revolution, and rehabilitated within the Hungarian Workers' Party after the revolution was suppressed.
- The National Basketball Association dropped six of its 17 teams as part of a reorganization to rid itself of financially weak franchises. The Denver Nuggets, St. Louis Bombers, and Chicago Stags departed, along with the Anderson (Indiana) Packers, the Sheboygan (Wisconsin) Red Skins, and the Waterloo (Iowa) Hawks. Denver, Anderson and Sheboygan announced plans to create their own league for the 1950–51 season.

== April 25, 1950 (Tuesday) ==
South Moluccan flag

- The Republic of the South Moluccas (Republik Maluku Selatan) was proclaimed by Christiaan Soumokil in three islands (Ambon, Buru and Ceram) that had been part of Indonesia. The islands of Ambon and Buru would be recaptured by the end of the year, but fighting would continue on Ceram for six more years, and the island of Soumokil would not fall until 1963.
- Chuck Cooper of Duquesne University became the first African-American to be selected in the NBA draft, picked in the second round by the Boston Celtics. Later in the draft, the Washington Capitols selected Earl Lloyd and Harold Hunter. After their college eligibility ended, both Cooper and Lloyd had signed temporary contracts to play for the Harlem Globetrotters.
- Born: Lenora Fulani, American third-party presidential candidate, in Chester, Pennsylvania, as Lenora Branch
- Died: Abdul Majeed Ahmed Hassan, 25, who had assassinated Egyptian Prime Minister Mahmoud an-Nukrashi Pasha on December 28, 1948. Hassan, a member of the Muslim Brotherhood, was hanged after being found guilty of Nukrashi's killing.

== April 26, 1950 (Wednesday) ==
- Sergei Korolev was designated as director of research and development for the Soviet long-range ballistic missile program.
- Saint Alphonsus Liguori (1696–1787) was declared by Pope Pius XII to be the patron saint of confessors and moral theologians".
- The drama film The Big Lift starring Montgomery Clift and Paul Douglas was released, telling the story of the Berlin Airlift less than a year after it ended.

== April 27, 1950 (Thursday) ==
- The United Kingdom formally recognized Israel, with de jure recognition following the de facto recognition that had been made since January 29, 1949. On the same day, the U.K. recognized the annexation of the West Bank by Jordan.
- In a speech to the American Newspaper Publishers Association that was broadcast on nationwide radio, former American President Herbert Hoover declared "I suggest that the United Nations should be reorganized without the Communist nations in it. If that is impractical, then a New United Front should be organized of those peoples who disavow communism, who stand for morals and religion, and who love freedom... and in rejecting the atheistic other world, I am confident that the Almighty God will be with us."
- Died:
  - Karel Koželuh, 55, Czech athlete who won the U.S. professional tennis championships in 1929, 1932 and 1937, and played on the Czechoslovak national football and ice hockey teams, was killed in an auto accident
  - Hobart Cavanaugh, 63, American character actor

== April 28, 1950 (Friday) ==
- In Thailand, King Bhumibol Adulyadej married Princess Sirikit Kitiyakara, one week before his coronation.
- The Uniate Church of Czechoslovakia, with 300,000 members in Slovakia, was abolished by order of the national government because of its ties with the Roman Catholic Church, and its believers were declared to be adherents to the Eastern Orthodox Church.
- The first meetings took place between the leaders of East Germany and the highest officials in that nation of the Protestant churches and the Roman Catholic minority.
- Born:
  - Jay Leno, American comedian and talk show host, in New Rochelle, New York
  - Marita Golden, African-American novelist, in Washington, DC
- Died: General Eduard Crasemann, 59, convicted German war criminal, six years into a ten-year sentence at Werl Prison in West Germany

== April 29, 1950 (Saturday) ==
- Douglas S. McKiernan became the first CIA agent to be killed in the course of a mission, after he was mistakenly shot by Tibetan border guards while trying to cross into India. Killed along with McKiernan were two Belarusian guides, Stephani Yanuishkin and Leonid Shutov, and all three were decapitated after their deaths. A group of couriers from the Dalai Lama, who were supposed to inform the border guards that the Americans and Belarusians were to be given safe passage, had been five days too late in delivering the message.
- Arsenal defeated Liverpool 2-0 in the FA Cup Final at Wembley Stadium.
- "The Third Man Theme" by Anton Karas topped the Billboard Best Sellers in Stores chart for the first of eleven consecutive weeks.
- Born:
  - Paul Holmes, New Zealand radio and television broadcaster (d. 2013)
  - Debbie Stabenow, former United States Senator from Michigan (2001-2025)

== April 30, 1950 (Sunday) ==
- Mao Zedong, the Chairman of the Communist Party of the People's Republic of China ordered comprehensive reforms of the traditional Chinese laws of marriage, to take effect on May 1. The first of the 27 articles of the decree abolished the feudal marriage system and the concept of "the supremacy of man over woman", promoting in its place "the free choice of partners", equal rights for husband and wife, and "the protection of the lawful interests of women and children". Bigamy, child marriage, concubinage, dowries, and restrictions on the remarriage of widows were eliminated. Marriages were prohibited between persons who had a parent in common, or where a party was sexually impotent, or suffered from a venereal disease, a mental disorder, leprosy, or "any other disease... rendering a person unfit for marriage." The law would be superseded by legislation on September 10, 1980.
- Murphy Army Hospital in Waltham, Massachusetts, was deactivated, bringing an end to an 11-month long experiment to determine "to what extent women could be substituted for men in the operation of Army hospitals". Major General Raymond W. Bliss, the Surgeon General of the United States Army, had started a process on June 1, 1949, in which civilian women and members of the Women's Army Corps would gradually replace men in the majority of medical and administrative jobs. However, no women Army doctors were available and "costs precluded the hospital's hiring of civilian women for the experiment."
- The Cardinal by Henry Morton Robinson began its twenty-four week run atop The New York Times Fiction Best Seller list.
- Died: Conrad Kilian, 51, French explorer and geologist, was found hanged in his hotel room in Grenoble
