= March 1975 =

Month of 1975

<<	March 1975					>>
Su	Mo	Tu	We	Th	Fr	Sa
						1
2	3	4	5	6	7	8
9	10	11	12	13	14	15
16	17	18	19	20	21	22
23	24	25	26	27	28	29
30	31

The following events occurred in March 1975:

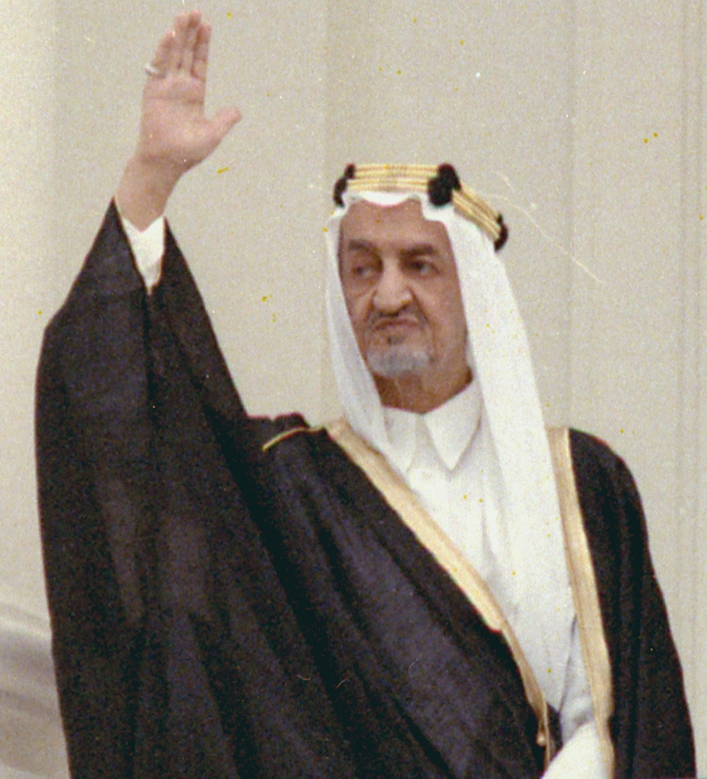
March 25, 1975: King Faisal of Saudi Arabia assassinated by nephew

March 2, 1975: Shah of Iran abolishes all political parties except one

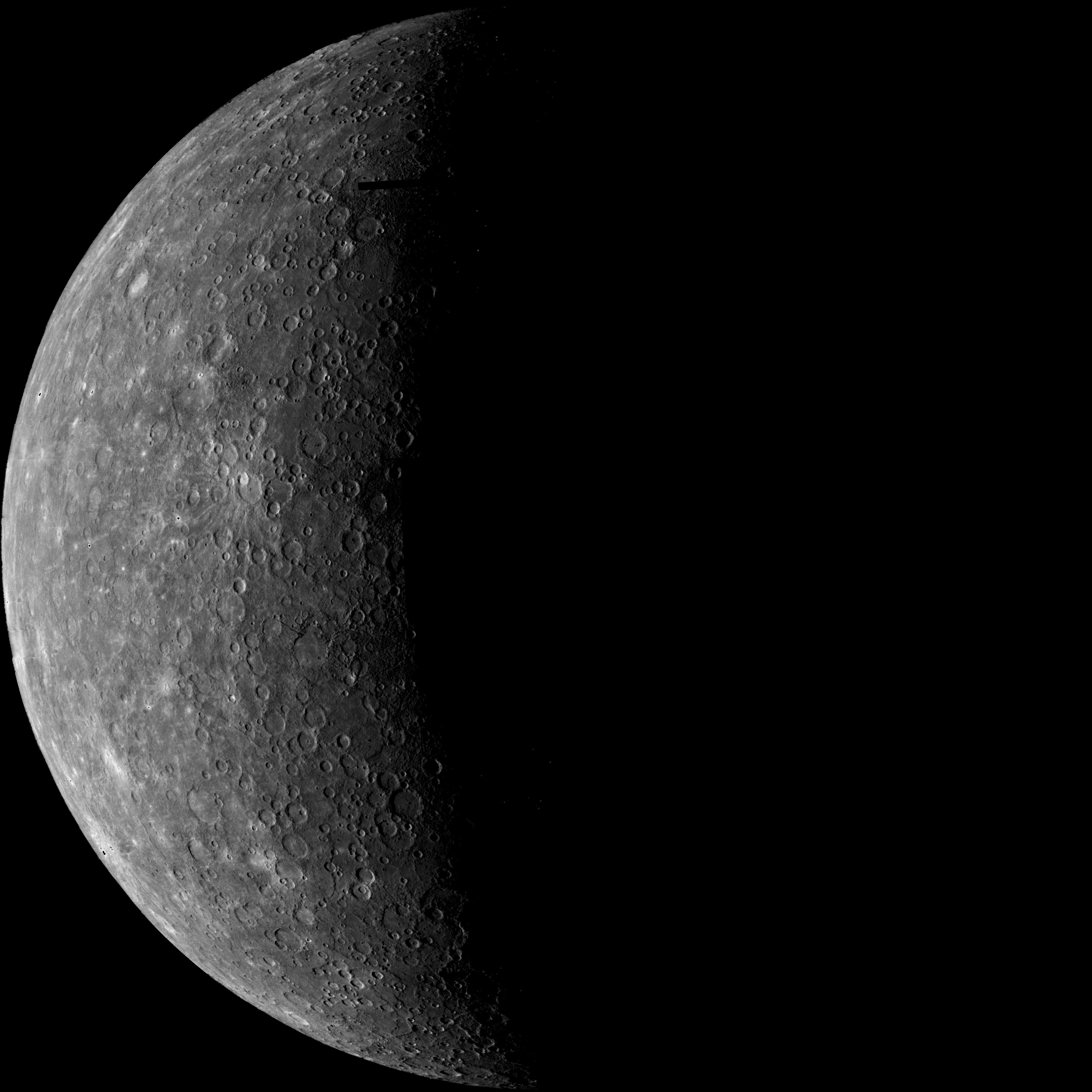
March 16, 1975: Mariner 10 photographs planet Mercury

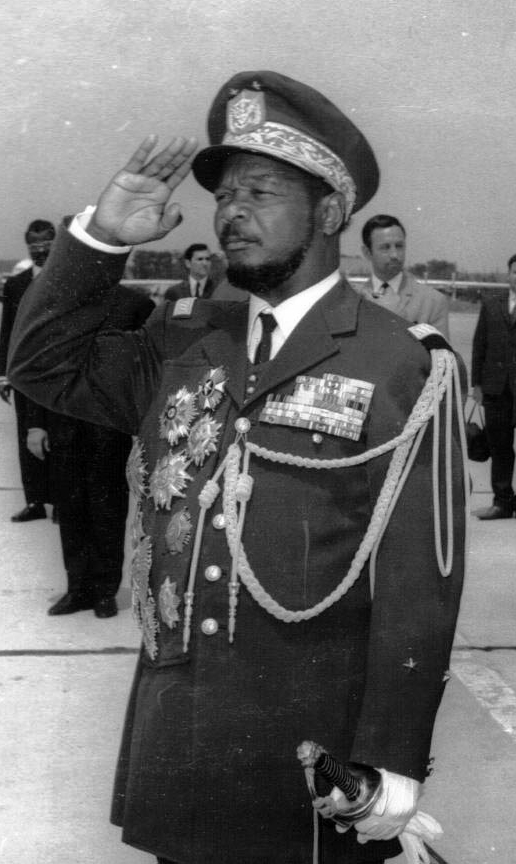
March 2, 1975: Bokassa makes himself C.A.R. President-for-life

== March 1, 1975 (Saturday) ==
- Color television broadcasting was officially introduced in Australia, where black and white TV had started in 1956. ATV (Australia) used the slogan "First in Color" while the Nine Network described its new programming as "Living Color".
- The Covenant of the Goddess was founded in Oakland, California, by 40 witches from 15 Wicca covens.
- The popularity of CB radio in the United States was fueled by a decision of the Federal Communications Commission to lower the cost of the required citizens band radio license from twenty dollars to four dollars.
- The army of North Vietnam, led by General Văn Tiến Dũng, began an attack on the Central Highlands of South Vietnam, starting at Pleiku, before moving on to Ban Mê Thuột.
- Aston Villa won the Football League Cup at Wembley, beating Norwich City 1–0 in the final.
- The factory of the Sponge Rubber Products Company, located in Shelton, Connecticut, was destroyed by a bomb planted by the Weather Underground terrorist group. The three security guards at the plant were overpowered and kidnapped by three masked men, who detonated the bombs, and freed the men later. Although nobody was hurt, the destruction caused the loss of 1,100 jobs.
- An Iraqi Airways airliner was hijacked by three Kurdish gunmen, shortly after taking off from Mosul to Baghdad with 93 people on board. The hijackers (Ahmad Hasan, Taha Naimi and Faud al-Qeitan) demanded that 85 Kurdish political prisoners be released, that they receive five million dollars, and that they be flown to Iran. After the plane made a forced landing in Tehran on a blocked runway, a gunbattle ensued between Iraqi security guards onboard and the gunmen. One passenger was killed and ten others wounded, including Hasan, who later died of his wounds. Taimi and al-Qeitan were executed a month later by a firing squad in Iran.
- Died: Clarence Ray Carpenter, 69, American primatologist

== March 2, 1975 (Sunday) ==
- Shah Mohammad Reza Pahlavi of Iran declared the kingdom to be a one-party state, with the new "Rastakhiz (Resurgence) Party" to be led by Prime Minister Amir-Abbas Hoveyda.
- Central African Republic President Jean-Bédel Bokassa, in power since 1965, declared himself President-for-life. A year later, he would declare himself to be an Emperor.
- A bomb planted at a bus terminal in Nairobi, Kenya, killed 27 people and injured almost 100.
- Born: Jaime Meline, American rap artist, nicknamed El-P; in New York City
- Died: J. M. Kariuki, Kenyan politician, was kidnapped from the Nairobi Hilton Hotel by bodyguards of Kariuki's political opponent, Kenyan President Jomo Kenyatta and murdered. His body was found three days later in a valley of the Ngong Hills.

== March 3, 1975 (Monday) ==
- The first 30 women "Mounties", officers of the Royal Canadian Mounted Police for the all-female RCMP Troop 17, graduated from RCMP Academy, Depot Division, after 32 had entered the academy on September 16, 1974, for regular training.
- In its decision in Cox Broadcasting Corp. v. Cohn, the United States Supreme Court declared unconstitutional, by an 8–1 vote, a Georgia law prohibiting the press from revealing the names of rape victims.
- Died: General Óscar Bonilla Bradanovic, 56, Chilean Minister of National Defense, in a helicopter crash, while returning from vacation at Curicó. Two French technicians of the Aérospatiale helicopter company were killed on March 22, in another helicopter accident, after investigating the crash.

== March 4, 1975 (Tuesday) ==
- English-born comedy actor Charlie Chaplin was knighted by Elizabeth II.
- Iran signed a trade deal pledging to spend 22 billion dollars in the United States over a ten-year period.
- Peter Lorenz, the Christian Democratic Union's candidate for Mayor of West Berlin, was released, unharmed, after the West German government freed five guerillas, gave each of them cash, and flew them to Aden in South Yemen.
- Television cameras were first permitted in the Parliament of Canada.
- Ethiopia's ruling military council, the Dergue, issued Proclamation 31, nationalizing all rural land, giving households 10 hectares apiece of land, and assigning 800 hectares apiece to local "Peasant Associations".

== March 5, 1975 (Wednesday) ==
- The Homebrew Computer Club, originally a gathering of computer hobbyists, held its very first meeting, at the garage of Gordon French in Menlo Park, California. One of the people in attendance, 24-year-old Steve Wozniak, couldn't afford the Intel 8080, and began searching for a cheaper 8-bit substitute. After finding the MOS Technology 6502 microprocessor, Wozniak worked at trying to modify it to hook to a standard keyboard and to connect to an ordinary television. Wozniak, Steve Jobs, and Ronald Wayne would join to form Apple, Inc.
- David Owen Brooks, who assisted Dean Arnold Corll and Elmer Wayne Henley in the serial killings of 28 young men and boys in Texas, was sentenced to life in prison for strangling of 15-year-old Billy Ray Lawrence, one of 27 murders committed in the summer of 1973 of which he had been accused.
- In Tel Aviv, the Savoy Hotel was seized by eight Al-Fatah commandos after they rowed ashore to Israel from the Mediterranean Sea. Thirteen people were taken hostage in the early morning. The Israeli counter-terrorism unit Sayeret Matkal stormed the hotel later in the day, killing seven of the eight guerillas. Eight hostages and three of the Israeli soldiers died in the operation.
- Born:
  - Jolene Blalock, American actress, best known as T'Pol on the series Star Trek: Enterprise; in San Diego
  - Niki Taylor, American model, in Fort Lauderdale, Florida

== March 6, 1975 (Thursday) ==
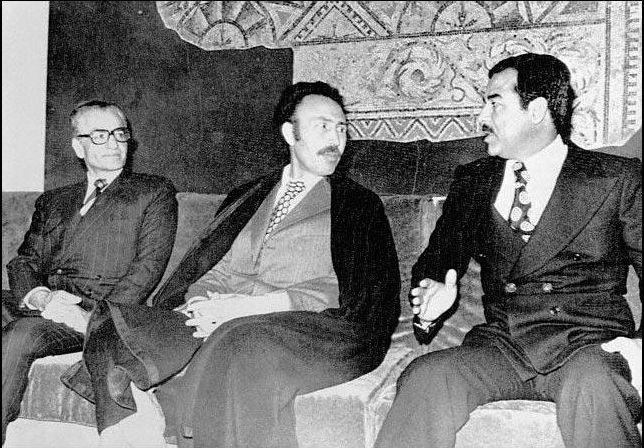
Houari Boumediene (center) with Saddam Hussein (right) and Mohammad Reza Shah Pahlavi (left) during the 1975 Algiers Agreement

- Iran and Iraq announced a settlement in their border dispute at a meeting of the OPEC nations in Algiers. The Shah of Iran signed on behalf of his nation, while Iraq was represented by Saddam Hussein, an aide to President Ahmed Hassan al-Bakr and future President of Iraq. The meeting was overseen by Algerian president Houari Boumediene. Iraq agreed to drop claims to half of the Shatt al-Arab, while Iran agreed not to supply weapons to Kurdish separatists in northern Iraq. In 1980, Iraq would break the agreement and invade Iran, starting the eight-year Iran–Iraq War.
- The key 26.6 second section of the "Zapruder film", the home movie which had inadvertently filmed the assassination of John F. Kennedy on November 22, 1963, was shown for the first time on television, broadcast by ABC News on "Good Night America" featuring Dick Gregory and Robert J. Groden, hosted by Geraldo Rivera.
- Technical Sergeant Leonard Matlovich of the United States Air Force presented letter to his commander at Langley Air Force Base, Captain Dennis Collins, announcing, "After some years of uncertainty, I have arrived at the conclusion that my sexual preferences are homosexual as opposed to heterosexual." In doing so, Matlovich became the first U.S. military serviceman to challenge a ban against service by gay men and lesbians.

== March 7, 1975 (Friday) ==
- The United States Senate voted 56–27 to change the rules on ending a filibuster. Previously, the vote of 67 the 100 Senators (at least 2/3rds) was needed to end an overly long speech, and the rule was changed to 60 percent.
- The body of teenage heiress Lesley Whittle, kidnapped 7 weeks earlier by the "Black Panther", was discovered in Bath Pool park, Kidsgrove, Staffordshire, England.
- The 114th and final episode of the television series The Odd Couple was broadcast on the U.S. ABC television network. Nearly five years after meticulous Felix Unger (played by Tony Randall) was divorced by his wife and moved into the apartment of his slob friend Oscar Madison (Jack Klugman), the story concluded with Felix being taken by his wife and moving out.
- Died:
  - Mikhail Bakhtin, 79, Soviet author and pioneer in semiotics
  - Ben Blue, 73, Canadian-American comedian

== March 8, 1975 (Saturday) ==
- The first "United Nations Day for Women's Rights and International Peace" was proclaimed on International Women's Day during the International Women's Year.
- The "Whip Inflation Now" (WIN) program, that had been launched on October 8, 1974, by the Citizens Action Committee to Fight Inflation", was brought to an end by the same Committee.
- The Cuban Family Code, which decreed equality between husbands and wives, went into effect.
- Died: George Stevens, 70, American film director, and winner of two Academy Awards for A Place in the Sun and Giant.

== March 9, 1975 (Sunday) ==
- As civil war continued between Eritrean secessionists and Ethiopia, the army of Ethiopia massacred 208 civilians in the city of Agordat, located in Eritrea's lands.
- The Golden Hinde II arrived in San Francisco Bay, re-enacting the voyage of Sir Francis Drake, which sailed in the bay in 1579. The journey had started on September 24 from Plymouth, England.
- Born: Roy Makaay, Dutch footballer known as "Das Phantom"; in Wijchen
- Died: Warren K. Lewis, 72, American chemistry professor known as "the father of chemical engineering".

== March 10, 1975 (Monday) ==
- Troops of the Army of North Vietnam began an early morning attack on the city of Ban Me Thuot in South Vietnam with the 316th, 10th and 320th Divisions, easily overrunning a South Vietnam Army regiment of defenders who were outnumbered by 5 1/2 to 1. By 10:30 the next morning, "Campaign 275" was over and had effectively placed half of South Vietnam behind enemy lines. Because of Ban Me Thuot's strategic location at the intersection of South Vietnam's two main highways, the defeat created a "domino effect" that would lead to the disintegration and conquest of South Vietnam, as ARVN troops abandoned the Highlands and fled south. NVA General Van Tien Dung would later write, "Was it true that the thunderous blow we had dealt at Ban Me Thuot had produced such a shattering impact on the enemy? It was true that the enemy had been stunned and rendered strategically confused. The enemy had again made another strategic mistake.
- Ibrahim Nasir, the president of the Maldives, fired Premier Ahmed Zalti and imposed presidential rule on the African nation.

== March 11, 1975 (Tuesday) ==
- The leftist military government in Portugal defeated a rightist coup attempt.
- Born: Buvaisar Saitiev, Russian freestyle wrestler, three time Olympic gold-medalist and six time world champion in his weight group; in Khasavyurt

== March 12, 1975 (Wednesday) ==
- The seventh and last "draft lottery", for conscription of 18-year-old American men into military service. Men born on December 8, 1956, would have been drafted first, in the event of a national emergency, followed by those born June 19 and March 22, while a February 12 birthday was drawn 366th and last. By 1975, the U.S. armed services were recruiting volunteers only. The draft registration requirement was suspended 20 days later, on April 1, and processing of all registrations would end on January 27, 1976.
- The Dubai Islamic Bank was established in the United Arab Emirates, becoming the first private institution to operate under the principles of Islamic banking. With the charging of interest on a loan prohibited by Islamic law, the banks instead make an investment in the item upon which the loan is planned, without a fixed interest rate. Similar Islamic banks were established in 1977 in Kuwait, Egypt and the Sudan. (See also for February 9, 1972, Cairo meeting to fashion the Islamic banking system)

== March 13, 1975 (Thursday) ==
- The first Chili's restaurant was opened. The chain now has 1,400 locations.
- U.S. senator Hubert H. Humphrey agreed to pay back taxes owed to the Internal Revenue Service, after his claim of a deduction of $199,153 for the donation of records from service as Vice President of the United States, was disallowed. Nearly a year earlier, then-President Richard M. Nixon had been disallowed a more than $450,000 deduction for his vice-presidential papers. Nixon and Humphrey had run against each other in the 1968 U.S. presidential election. Humphrey later paid $240,000 in taxes, penalties and interest.
- Khmer Rouge guerillas, fighting to take over Cambodia, destroyed a 20-ton ammunition dump at the Phnom Penh. Nobody was hurt, but the shrapnel rendered two commercial aircraft inoperable.
- Same Time, Next Year, a romantic comedy written by Bernard Slade, premiered on Broadway at the Brooks Atkinson Theatre and would run for 1,453 performances.

== March 14, 1975 (Friday) ==
- After the fall of Ban Me Thuot, South Vietnam's President Thieu made the decision to abandon the northwestern half of the nation to the North Vietnamese invaders, withdrawing troops and ordering an evacuation, in hopes of consolidating a defense of the remaining provinces around Saigon, and possibly regrouping for a counterattack. "The strategy might have had a chance of success had it been made sooner," an observer noted later, but "the plan to retake certain strategic points and commence an orderly withdrawal from the Central Highlands was made too late." South Vietnam's defense would collapse so rapidly that the entire nation would be in North Vietnamese control within six weeks.
- Former Oklahoma governor David Hall, who had been indicted on January 13 while still in office, was convicted of racketeering, extortion and perjury, and sentenced to three years in federal prison. He would be released after 19 months.
- Died:
  - Susan Hayward (stage name for Edythe Marrenner), 57, American film actress, died of brain cancer. Hayward had won the 1958 Academy Award for Best Actress for her role in the film I Want to Live!.
  - Keeve M. "Kip" Siegel, 51, co-developer of the first small-scale thermonuclear fusion within a laboratory, died of a stroke suffered while testifying in Congress before the Joint Committee on Atomic Energy about his goal in developing a cheap source of energy through use of lasers to achieve fusion. The day before, Siegel was reading a prepared statement when he couldn't say the words aloud, and slumped over after taking a sip from a glass of water.

== March 15, 1975 (Saturday) ==
- Helios 1 made the closest approach to the Sun up to that time by a man-made object, coming within 28.7 million miles (46.2 million km) and sending back data to West Germany's space agency, the DFVLR (Deutsche Forschungs- und Versuchsanstalt für Luft- und Raumfahrt) at Oberpfaffenhofen as well as to the United States space agency, NASA.
- South Vietnam's President Nguyen Van Thieu ordered his army to abandon defense of the nation's second-largest city, Huế, and to retreat southward to defend Saigon. The decision led to more than 250,000 civilians refugees fleeing southward over the next six weeks.
- In Racine, Wisconsin, hang glider pilot John Moody was able to run and then lift off ("foot-launch") from the frozen surface of a lake to begin a 30-minute flight. Moody had modified a UFM Easy Rider biplane glider by adding a 12.5 horse power engine and a 28 in (710 mm) propeller, achieving the first foot-launched powered hang glider takeoff and sustained flight. He would demonstrate his creation, which he dubbed Icarus II, at a convention of the Experimental Aviation Association on July 27, 1976, effectively introducing ultralight aviation to the United States.
- Born:
  - Veselin Topalov, Bulgarian chess grandmaster and world champion (2005–2006); in Ruse
  - Eva Longoria, American actress (Desperate Housewives), in Corpus Christi, Texas
- Died: Aristotle Onassis, 69, Greek shipping magnate who rose from a menial job to become a billionaire and the husband of former U.S. first lady Jackie Kennedy.

== March 16, 1975 (Sunday) ==
- The Mariner 10 satellite made the closest approach by an Earth launched vehicle, to that time, to the planet Mercury, orbiting at a distance of 203 miles (307 km) and returning clear photographs of the first planet's surface.
- As it was approaching San Carlos de Bariloche on a flight from El Palomar, an Argentine Air Force airplane crashed into the side of a mountain in the Andes, killing all 47 passengers and five crew.
- The South Vietnamese defenders of Pleiku fled only 15 days after the North Vietnamese invasion, with hundreds of thousands of troops and civilians evacuating so suddenly that North Vietnam's General Van Tien Dung was surprised at the result of what had been intended as a limited series of attacks. General Dung would recount later in a report to the Communist Party that his thought at the time was "Why such a retreat? And who had given the orders for it?" and notes that the original plan had been to foment an uprising in South Vietnam in 1976. The fall of Pleiku was followed by the retreat of South Vietnamese troops and civilians in provinces further south, and North Vietnamese and Viet Cong troops toppled the government in Saigon within six weeks, on April 30.
- In the U.S., the first indoor soccer championship of the North American Soccer League (NASL) was watched by 8,618 people at the Cow Palace indoor arena near Daly City, California. The San Jose Earthquakes defeated the new Tampa Bay Rowdies, 8 to 5, at the end of a two-month series of games involving 16 of the 20 NASL teams.
- Died:
  - Perle Mesta, 83, American hostess and former ambassador to Luxembourg, as well as the inspiration for the Broadway musical Call Me Madam
  - Vincent Sheean, 75, American journalist

== March 17, 1975 (Monday) ==
- Kukrit Pramoj formed a new coalition government in Thailand, becoming prime minister, although his Social Action Party had only 18 seats in Parliament.
- Television Electronic Disc (TeD), a form of videorecording, was introduced by West German electronic manufacturers Telefunken and Teldec.

== March 18, 1975 (Tuesday) ==
- Herbert Chitepo, the 51-year old leader of the Zimbabwe African National Union (ZANU), was assassinated by a bomb that had been wired to his car at his home in Lusaka, Zambia. Chitepo, his bodyguard Silas Shamiso, and a child who had been playing in a yard next door were killed by the blast. It was unclear whether the killing was done by forces of the white government in Rhodesia (now Zimbabwe), by a rival Zimbabwean organization, or by a rival within the ZANU group. Robert Mugabe would succeed Chitepo as the leader of ZANU and would become Zimbabwe's first black African prime minister in 1980.
- The National Assembly of Tunisia voted to proclaim Tunisian leader Habib Bourguiba as "President for Life". Borguiba, who had become the North African republic's first president in 1957, had been re-elected a fourth time in 1974 despite a provision in the Tunisian constitution that prohibited a president from being re-elected to more than three consecutive terms. Bourguiba, who would live to the age of 96, would be removed from office at the age of 83 in 1987 after increasing evidence of dementia.
- Private schools were outlawed in the African nation of Equatorial Guinea by order of its dictator, President Francisco Macías Nguema. Macías had previously closed all libraries in the nation and prohibited use of the word "intellectual".
- Born: Brian Griese, American NFL quarterback and son of NFL quarterback Bob Griese; in Miami

== March 19, 1975 (Wednesday) ==
- The People's Republic of China granted an amnesty for 290 Nationalist Chinese (Taiwan) whom they had convicted of "war crimes" against the Communist Chinese government. Scheduled for release were 219 military officers, 21 government officials and 50 secret agents.
- After initially hoping to maintain control of the area around Huế, the second-largest city in South Vietnam, President Thieu ordered the area to be evacuated, sending even more refugees toward Saigon.
- Born:
  - Vivian Hsu (Xu Ruoxuan) Taiwanese singer, actress and model, in Taichung
  - Le Jingyi, Chinese swimmer, gold medalist in women's swimming championships and in 1996 Olympics; in Shanghai

== March 20, 1975 (Thursday) ==
- Victoria Fyodorova, a Soviet actress who had been born from the affair of U.S. Navy Admiral Jackson Tate and Soviet film actress Zoya Fyodorova, was finally granted an exit visa by the Soviet Union.

== March 21, 1975 (Friday) ==
- The Dergue, the Ethiopian military junta that had overthrown the Emperor Haile Selassie I six months earlier, announced that it was abolishing the centuries-old Ethiopian Empire. According to Ethiopian tradition, the monarchy was almost 3,000 years old, dating back to 950 B.C.
- The Inkatha Freedom Party was founded in South Africa to fight against white minority rule of the black majority population.
- All 16 passengers and crew aboard a U.S. Air Force C-141A Starlifter were killed in the U.S. state of Washington when an air traffic controller at McChord Field gave the crew a descent command intended for another aircraft. The C-141A descended to an altitude of less than 7,756 feet (2,364 m) as it approached the Cascade Mountains and crashed into the side of Mount Constance.
- Died: Joe Medwick, 63, American baseball player

== March 22, 1975 (Saturday) ==
- A worker, testing for leaks, accidentally caused a fire at the Browns Ferry Nuclear Plant in Alabama, at the time the largest nuclear power plant in the world. After detecting a persistent leak in a concrete wall and attempting to plug it with polyurethane sheets the worker tested it for signs of airflow with the instrument available to him—a candle. The highly flammable polyurethane was ignited, the fire spread into the other side of the wall where it could not be reached, and after seven hours, caused ten million dollars' worth of damage.
- The Indiana University Hoosiers, unbeaten (31–0) and the #1 ranked men's college basketball team, was upset, 92–90, by the #5 ranked University of Kentucky Wildcats, in the Mideast Regional Final of the NCAA basketball tournament at Dayton, Ohio. At the time, the NCAA held tournaments only for the men's teams and the Association for Intercollegiate Athletics for Women (AIAW) was the athletic organization for women's college sports.
- The Delta State University Lady Statesmen of Cleveland, Mississippi, denied a fourth consecutive U.S. women's college basketball championship to the Immaculata University Mighty Macs of West Chester, Pennsylvania, winning the AIAW women's basketball tournament by a score of 90 to 81 at the competition, hosted by Madison College in Harrisonburg, Virginia.
- The Indian state of Nagaland was placed under President's rule for two years, with the national government assuming control of state affairs. Presidential rulership would also be imposed in 1988, 1992 and 2008.
- Norwegian commercial diver A. L. Alvestad died of hypothermia and hypoxia due to overwork while conducting a bell dive from the drillship 'Borgny' Dolphin in the North Sea.
- "Ding-a-dong" by Teach-In (music by Dick Bakker, lyrics by Will Luikinga and Eddy Ouwens) won the 20th Eurovision Song Contest 1975 (staged in Stockholm) for the Netherlands.
- Died: Cass Daley, 59, American comedian and film actress, after falling on a glass table at her home

== March 23, 1975 (Sunday) ==
- After CBS became the first American TV network to openly practice checkbook journalism, former White House Chief of Staff H. R. Haldeman appeared in the first of two interviews by Mike Wallace on the CBS news program 60 Minutes. The appearance, and Haldeman's answers to questions about ex-President Richard M. Nixon and the Watergate scandal, came in return for a payment of at least $25,000 by CBS News. Haldeman admitted in the first interview that he had talked President Nixon out of destroying tape recordings of conversations in Nixon's office, saying that he "stupidly — didn't really think the thing through". Haldeman was serving a federal prison sentence at the time of the interview.
- Jean Gueury, France's ambassador to Somalia, was kidnapped as he left worship services at a cathedral in Mogadishu. Somali police quickly located the house where Gueury was held hostage, and the French embassy negotiated with the kidnappers, agreeing to their demands only minutes before the threatened execution of Gueury. France released two Somali terrorists from prison, provided the kidnappers $100,000 in gold, and allowed them to fly to Yemen, where Gueury was freed unharmed.
- At Ortisei in Italy, Gustavo Thoeni defeated Ingemar Stemmark in the parallel slalom race to win the FIS Alpine Ski World Cup for the fourth time.

== March 24, 1975 (Monday) ==
- Chuck Wepner, a relatively unknown boxer, went up against world heavyweight champion Muhammad Ali in a bout in Cleveland. Wepner, a "club fighter" who had been selected as an easy opponent for the champ, knocked Ali down to the canvas in the ninth round, then went on to do what few of Ali's opponents had been able to do, "going the distance" for the full 15 rounds. The Ali-Wepner fight was watched on closed circuit TV by an out of work actor, Sylvester Stallone, who turned his own idea about an obscure boxer, getting a title shot, into the film Rocky, with Stallone portraying the Wepner-like Rocky Balboa.
- After it had sent back photographs of the planet Mercury, Mariner 10 was switched off at 1221 UTC. Nearly an hour earlier, it had exhausted its supply of fuel to its attitude control system, preventing it from maintaining a steady fix on the planet. Further such exploration of Mercury would not take place again until 2008, after the 2004 launch of the satellite MESSENGER.
- The beaver became the official "symbol of the sovereignty of Canada", after Royal Assent was given, by the governor-general, to legislation passed by both houses of Parliament.
- Alexander Mitchell, a 50-year-old bricklayer in the English town of King's Lynn, literally died laughing, while viewing a TV episode of the British comedy The Goodies. Mitchell laughed for 25 minutes before his heart failed. His widow reportedly sent a letter to the comic group, thanking them for making his final moments happy.
- In Milan, Deputy Prosecutor Guido Viola filed his investigative reports about the Red Brigades and the death of Giangiacomo Feltrinelli. The document officially concluded that the publisher died accidentally while preparing a bomb attack and was not killed by other persons.
- Born: Kenny Kimes, American murderer
- Died: Willie Ritchie, 84, former world lightweight boxing champion (1912–14)

== March 25, 1975 (Tuesday) ==
- King Faisal of Saudi Arabia was shot and killed by his nephew, Prince Faisal bin Musaid, during a meeting with a visiting delegation from Kuwait. Prince Faisal knew one of the members of the Kuwaiti delegation, and followed the group in to meet the King. When the King recognized the Prince, he approached his nephew to be greeted. Prince Faisal then drew a .38 caliber revolver from his robes and fired three shots at close range, killing one of the most powerful men in the world almost instantly.

== March 26, 1975 (Wednesday) ==
- The first license ever issued in the United States for a same-sex marriage was granted by Clela Rorex, the County Clerk for Boulder County, Colorado. Dave McCord and Dave Zamora had consulted with the county's District Attorney, who decided that there was nothing in Colorado law that prohibited same sex marriage, and Rorex gave approval for the two men to marry. On April 24, State Attorney General Joyce Murdoch would invalidate the license, as well as five others issued by Rorex.
- Khalid ibn Abd al-Aziz al-Saud, the Crown Prince and the younger half-brother of King Faisal, was crowned as the new King of Saudi Arabia. Faisal was buried, pursuant to Islamic custom, at sundown the day after his death, without a coffin and in an unmarked grave. King Khalid named his half-brother Fahd as the new Crown Prince.
- The film Jaws was given its first preview showing before an audience, in advance of its June 20 nationwide release, at the Medallion Theater in Dallas, Texas.
- Western Europe's first Communist-dominated cabinet was installed by Portugal's Prime Minister Vasco Gonçalves.
- The Biological Weapons Convention, the first multinational treaty banning the production or use of a specific category of weapons, entered into force by its own terms.
- A fire at the Excelsior Hotel in Italy killed 17 people at the Santa Maria Maggiore winter resort in Valle Vigezzo. Because there was no fire station in the valley, rescue arrived late, leaving local volunteers to fight the fire. The dead were 15 French tourists and newlywed Italian husband and wife.
- Born: Roberto Bolle, Italian danseur, in Casale Monferrato.

== March 27, 1975 (Thursday) ==
- Construction began on the 800 mile long "Alaska Pipeline" that would transport crude oil from Prudhoe Bay to Valdez.
- In Italy, the first chapter of the successful Fantozzi cinema saga is released.
- Born: Fergie (Stacy Ferguson), American pop/R&B singer/rapper of the Black Eyed Peas and actress; in Hacienda Heights, California

== March 28, 1975 (Friday) ==
- A fire in the maternity ward at Kucic Hospital in Rijeka, former Yugoslavia, killed 25 people.

== March 29, 1975 (Saturday) ==
- As North Vietnam's army made its way into Da Nang, a World Airways Boeing 727 made its fourth and final flight to evacuate refugees to safety in South Vietnam. When the airline's president, Ed Daly, arrived, there were over 1,000 people at Da Nang. Instead of women and children, 400 South Vietnamese soldiers forced their way onto a plane which normally carried 150 passengers. The jet took off with its back stairway still open, and those who did not make it on board tried to climb on into the wheelwells and the undercarriage of the jet.
- Born: Jan Bos, Dutch sprint skater and two time world-champion; in Harderwijk
- Died: Virginio Rosetta, Italian footballer with 52 caps for the Italian national team between 1920 and 1934

== March 30, 1975 (Sunday) ==
- On Easter Sunday in Hamilton, Ohio, James Ruppert murdered his mother, his brother and sister-in-law, and the couple's eight children, ranging in age from 4 to 17 years old. Ruppert surrendered to police, and was later sentenced to two life terms in prison.

== March 31, 1975 (Monday) ==
- In his final game on the sideline, John Wooden coached UCLA to its 10th national championship in 12 seasons when the Bruins defeated Kentucky 92–85 in the title game at San Diego, California.
- The 635th and final original episode of the long-running TV series Gunsmoke, titled The Sharecroppers, was telecast. After originally being a radio series, the show had started on television on September 10, 1955, and ran for 20 seasons.
- Lon Nol, the president of the Khmer Republic (formerly Cambodia) since 1970, bid farewell to his constituents and fled the country.
- The New Zealand Broadcasting Corporation made its last broadcasts under that name. The channel frequencies in Dunedin and Wellington become TV1 (now TVNZ 1) the next morning, while those in Auckland and Christchurch were not used until the launch of TV2 (now TVNZ 2) on June 30 later that year.
