= February 1975 =

Month of 1975

<<	February 1975					>>
Su	Mo	Tu	We	Th	Fr	Sa
						1
2	3	4	5	6	7	8
9	10	11	12	13	14	15
16	17	18	19	20	21	22
23	24	25	26	27	28

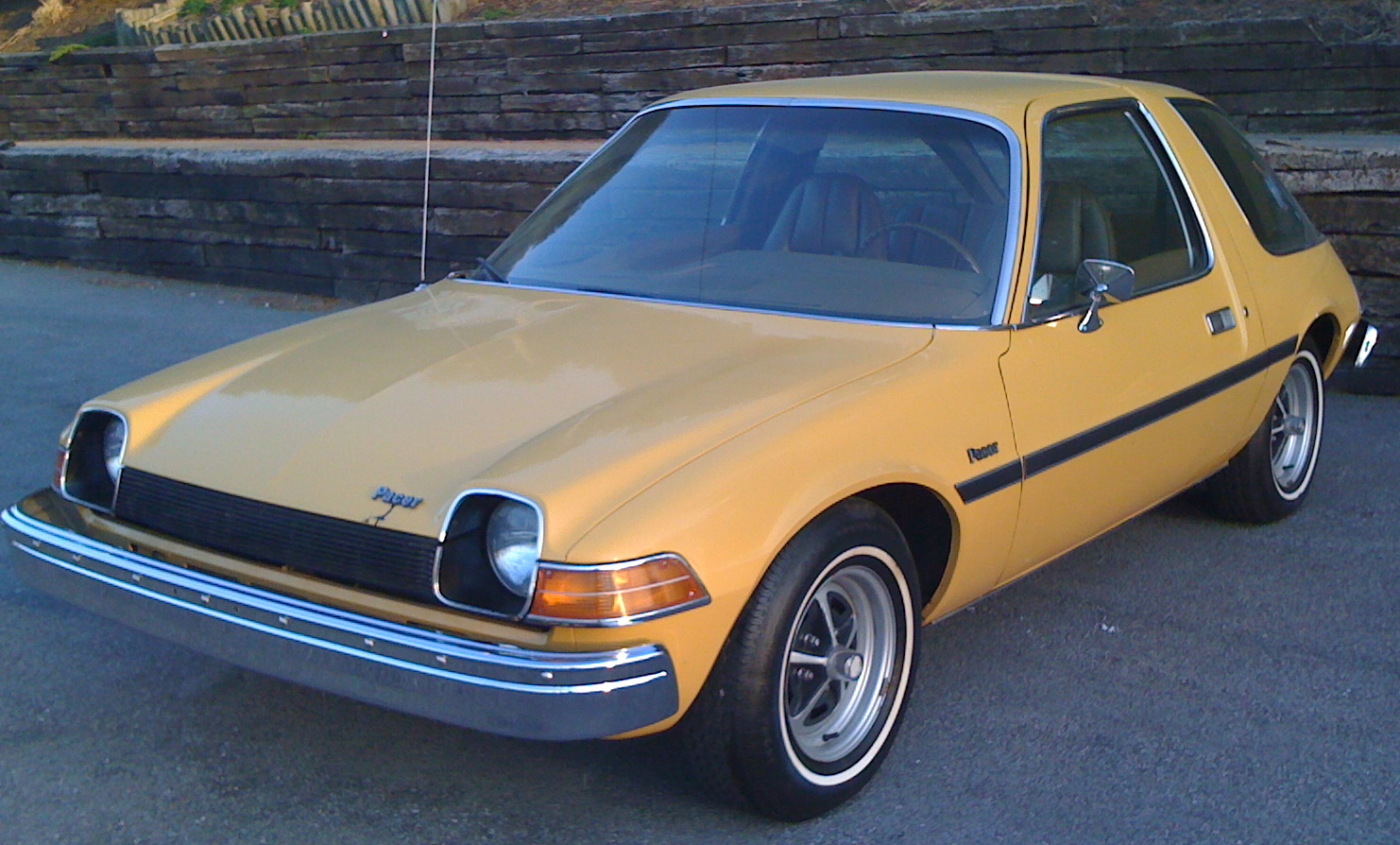
February 28, 1975: AMC introduces the Pacer

The following events occurred in February 1975:

== February 1, 1975 (Saturday) ==
- U.S. President Ford announced that the 1976 fiscal year budget would reflect a deficit of 52 billion dollars. At the time, it was "the largest peacetime deficit in the nation's history".
- The Intercontinental Broadcasting Corporation was launched in the Philippines.
- Born: Big Boi (Antwan Patton), American rapper with OutKast; in Savannah, Georgia

== February 2, 1975 (Sunday) ==
- Ethiopian troops massacred 103 civilians in the village of Woki Duba, after driving Eritrean rebels from the town.
- Born: Todd Bertuzzi, Canadian NHL player noted for his 2004 attack on Steve Moore during a 2004 game; in Sudbury, Ontario

== February 3, 1975 (Monday) ==
- Eli M. Black, the 53-year-old CEO of United Brands, was driven to his office at the Pan Am Building in Manhattan, rode to the 44th floor, locked the door inside his private office, broke a window, and jumped to his death. Subsequent investigations revealed that Black had paid a $1,250,000 bribe to the Economics Minister of Honduras, Abraham Bennaton Ramos, in order to prevent that nation from placing a tax on the bananas from United Brands' farms.
- Died: Umm Kulthum, 76, Egyptian actress and singer

== February 4, 1975 (Tuesday) ==
- The Haicheng earthquake killed 2,041 and injured 27,538 in Haicheng, Liaoning, China. In a possible example of successful earthquake prediction, the Chinese government had issued warnings at 2:00 in the afternoon to the three million residents of the southern Liaoning province, advising them to spend the night outdoors in tents. At 7:36 pm, a 7.8 magnitude quake flattened Haicheng.
- Former British Prime Minister Edward Heath stepped down as chairman of the Conservative Party after former Education Minister Margaret Thatcher outpolled him 130-119, still less than the majority 139 of 276 votes needed for anyone to become the party's leader. One week later, Thatcher would become the first woman to lead a British political party.
- Born: Natalie Imbruglia, Australian actress and singer, in Sydney
- Died: Louis Jordan, 66, American jazz bandleader, in Los Angeles

== February 5, 1975 (Wednesday) ==
- The Army of Peru suppressed a two-day strike by the Lima police department. At least 100 people died in Lima during the national emergency.
- Colonel Richard Ratsimandrava was sworn in as President of the Malagasy Republic, succeeding Gabriel Ramanantsoa. He would serve for only six days before being assassinated.

== February 6, 1975 (Thursday) ==
- Thieves in Italy broke into the Ducal Palace art museum at Urbino, and stole the paintings La Muta by Raphael, and the masterpieces The Flagellation of Christ and Madonna di Senigallia, by Piero della Francesca, considered to be three of the ten most famous Italian paintings from the Renaissance The works were recovered, unharmed, on March 24, 1976, from a hotel room in Locarno, Switzerland.
- An Australian visitor to South Africa became the first victim of a new outbreak of the Marburg virus, thought to have been eradicated eight years earlier, after being stung by an unknown arthropod near Hwange. He would die on February 19 in Johannesburg.
- A crucial by-election was held in Kankesanthurai, Sri Lanka. Tamil independence advocate S. J. V. Chelvanayakam retained his seat in the National State Assembly and cited the victory as a mandate for Tamil sovereignty.
- British commercial diver John Martin drowned when his diving helmet slipped off during his ascent from a surface-orientated dive in the Stavanger fjord in Norway. There was some evidence that he had experienced nitrogen narcosis. Martin's body was never recovered.
- On the same day, a Dutch commercial diver reportedly disappeared while about to conduct a welding job in the North Sea at a depth of 14 metres (46 ft); his body was never recovered. This death appears in the records of the British Health and Safety Executive (HSE), but not in those of the Staatstoezicht op de Mijnen (SodM) in the Netherlands.
- Born: Tomoko Kawase, Japanese singer with The Brilliant Green, in Kyoto
- Died: Sir Keith Park, 82, New Zealand born Air Chief Marshal of the Royal Air Force, nicknamed "The Defender of London" for his work during the Battle of Britain

== February 7, 1975 (Friday) ==
- The Los Angeles Times revealed the existence of Project Azorian, the American CIA's attempt to recover the Soviet submarine K-129, which had sunk in 1968. According to the investigative report, confidential files on the operation were "believed to have been among the documents stolen by safecrackers" during a burglary of the offices of the Summa Corporation the previous June, and had been held by the thieves who demanded one million dollars to prevent their leaking.
- Former White House aide Charles W. Colson told the Today Show that President Nixon had talked to him on December 18, 1973, about resigning, but did not do so because he was afraid that Vice-President Ford "couldn't control Henry Kissinger". Nixon's resignation had taken place almost eight months later, on August 9, 1974.

== February 8, 1975 (Saturday) ==
The proposal for Bolivia's access to the ocean

- Representatives of the nations of Bolivia and Chile signed the Charaña Accord that would have changed the geography of South America and given landlocked Bolivia a port on the Pacific Ocean. The two countries, represented by presidents Augusto Pinochet of Chile and Hugo Banzer of Bolivia restored diplomatic relations which had been severed since 1962. Under the accord, subject to codification of a treaty and ratification by all interested parties, Chile agreed to cede the port of Arica and a corridor across land north of the Lluta River to Bolivia, in exchange for Bolivia's cession of territory to Chile. However, the nation of Peru had the right of a veto under the 1929 Treaty of Lima. and objected to the transfer of former Peruvian territory to Bolivia. The transfer of territory never took place, and Bolivia would sever all diplomatic relations with Chile in 1982.

Duchy of Cornwall

- Nine members of the Stannary, the parliament of the Duchy of Cornwall, signed a resolution declaring Cornwall, and its 350,000 Cornishmen, independent of the United Kingdom. Bus conductor Brian Hamblet drew up the document, referring to himself as the "Lord Protector of the Stannary Parliament", after being referred to as Lord Protector of the Stannaries in a letter from the Ministry for the Environment.
- Died: Robert Robinson, 88, British chemist and 1947, Nobel Prize laureate.

== February 9, 1975 (Sunday) ==
- Soyuz 17 cosmonauts Georgi Grechko and Aleksei Gubarev returned to Earth after one month in orbit aboard the Salyut 4 space station.
- A West German military transport crashed into the mountains of western Crete, killing all 42 people on board.
- Born: Vladimir Guerrero, Dominican MLB outfielder, and 2004 AL MVP; in Nizao

== February 10, 1975 (Monday) ==
- The Council of the European Community passed the Equal Pay Directive, number75/117/EEC, requiring its member states to follow "the principle of equal pay for men and women".
- Isabel Perón, the President of Argentina, signed "Decree 261", giving the nation's armed forces the authority to enter the rebellious Tucumán Province and to "annihilate subversion" of "Operativo Independencia" by any necessary means.
- Australian Attorney General Lionel Murphy was appointed as one of the seven judges of the High Court of Australia, where he served until his death in 1986.
- Born:
  - Hiroki Kuroda, Japanese baseball pitcher for the Hiroshima Toyo Carp and the Los Angeles Dodgers; in Osaka
  - Lee Soo-geun, South Korean stand-up comedian, in Gyeonggi Province
- Died: Nikos Kavvadias, 65, Greek poet and writer

== February 11, 1975 (Tuesday) ==
- Malagazy Republic President Richard Ratsimandrava, recently inaugurated on the east African island of Madagascar, was assassinated as he was being driven through Ambohijatovo Square in Tananarive. Sworn in six days earlier, he had been returning home from a cabinet meeting when he was attacked by machine gun fire, and died of his wounds hours later. He was replaced by General Gilles Andriamahazo.
- Margaret Thatcher was elected as the new leader of the United Kingdom's Conservative Party, becoming the first woman to lead a major British political party and the first female Leader of Her Majesty's Opposition. Thatcher received 146 votes of the 276 Conservative members of the House of Commons, a majority, and her closest rival, William Whitelaw, received 79. When the Conservatives formed a government in 1979, Mrs. Thatcher, a research chemist and tax lawyer, became the first female British Prime Minister.
- William Tolbert, the President of Liberia, hosted John Vorster, the Prime Minister of South Africa in what was supposed to have been a secret meeting, as South Africa had been repudiated by most of the rest of the continent because of its apartheid policies. The Times of London broke the story two days later with the headline "Mr Vorster Pays Secret Visit to Liberian Leader", to the embarrassment of the Liberian government.
- Mexico's President Luis Echeverría Álvarez decreed that Tiburón Island should be returned to the Seri people, who had lived there and named it Tahejöc.

== February 12, 1975 (Wednesday) ==
- Voters in South Korea overwhelmingly reaffirmed the 1972 "Yushin Constitution", with 80% of the eligible voters casting ballots. Because that constitution had given the President of the Fourth Republic greater power, the vote was seen as a referendum on the popularity of President Park Chung Hee.
- Born: Regla Torres, Cuban volleyball player and three time Olympic gold medalist; designated "Best Player of the 20th Century" by the Fédération Internationale de Volleyball; in Havana
- Died:
  - Carl Lutz, 79, Swiss envoy to Hungary and humanitarian who was credited with helping 62,000 Hungarian Jews to emigrate during the Holocaust
  - Sir Franklin Gimson, 84, British colonial administrator and former Governor of Hong Kong (1945) and Governor of Singapore (1946–52)
  - André Beaufre, 73, French general
  - Dagmar Godowsky, 77, American silent film star from 1919 to 1926;

== February 13, 1975 (Thursday) ==
Turkish Cyprus (red) and Greek Cyprus (gray)

- The Turkish Federated State of Cyprus was proclaimed by Rauf Denktaş, who had formerly been the Vice-President of the Republic of Cyprus until war divided the predominantly Greek southern half from the mostly Turkish northern part. Denktas would proclaim full independence of the area on November 12, 1983.
- An intense fire broke out on the 11th floor of the North Tower of the World Trade Center shortly after midnight, then spread across six floors, from the 9th to the 14th, before being brought under control. There were no serious injuries, but 16 firemen were treated for smoke inhalation. Only fifty people, all maintenance employees, were present in the towers and were safely evacuated. New York City Councilmen Howard Golden and Stephen Kaufman, citing the need for mandatory installation of sprinkler systems, wrote in a joint statement, "Had that fire erupted during the working day, we could have had another Triangle Shirtwaist disaster."

== February 14, 1975 (Friday) ==
- The highest scoring professional basketball game, up to that time, took place in San Diego as the San Diego Conquistadors beat the New York Nets, 176-166, in an American Basketball Association contest. The "Qs" tied the Nets, 129-129, when Travis Grant scored at the buzzer. With seven seconds left in overtime, Julius "Dr. J" Erving of the Nets tied the game again, 144-144. Bill Melchionni of the Nets tied the score 152-152 with 22 seconds left in the second overtime, and the Nets' Brian Taylor closed the third overtime with the score at 161-161. When the game ended after four overtimes, and more than 3 hours of real time, a record 342 points had been scored. The record would later be broken in an NBA game on December 13, 1983, when the Detroit Pistons beat the Denver Nuggets, a former ABA team, 186-184 in three overtimes.
- In Manila, 50,000 members of the Iglesia Ni Cristo held a protest march against martial law human rights abuses.
- Died:
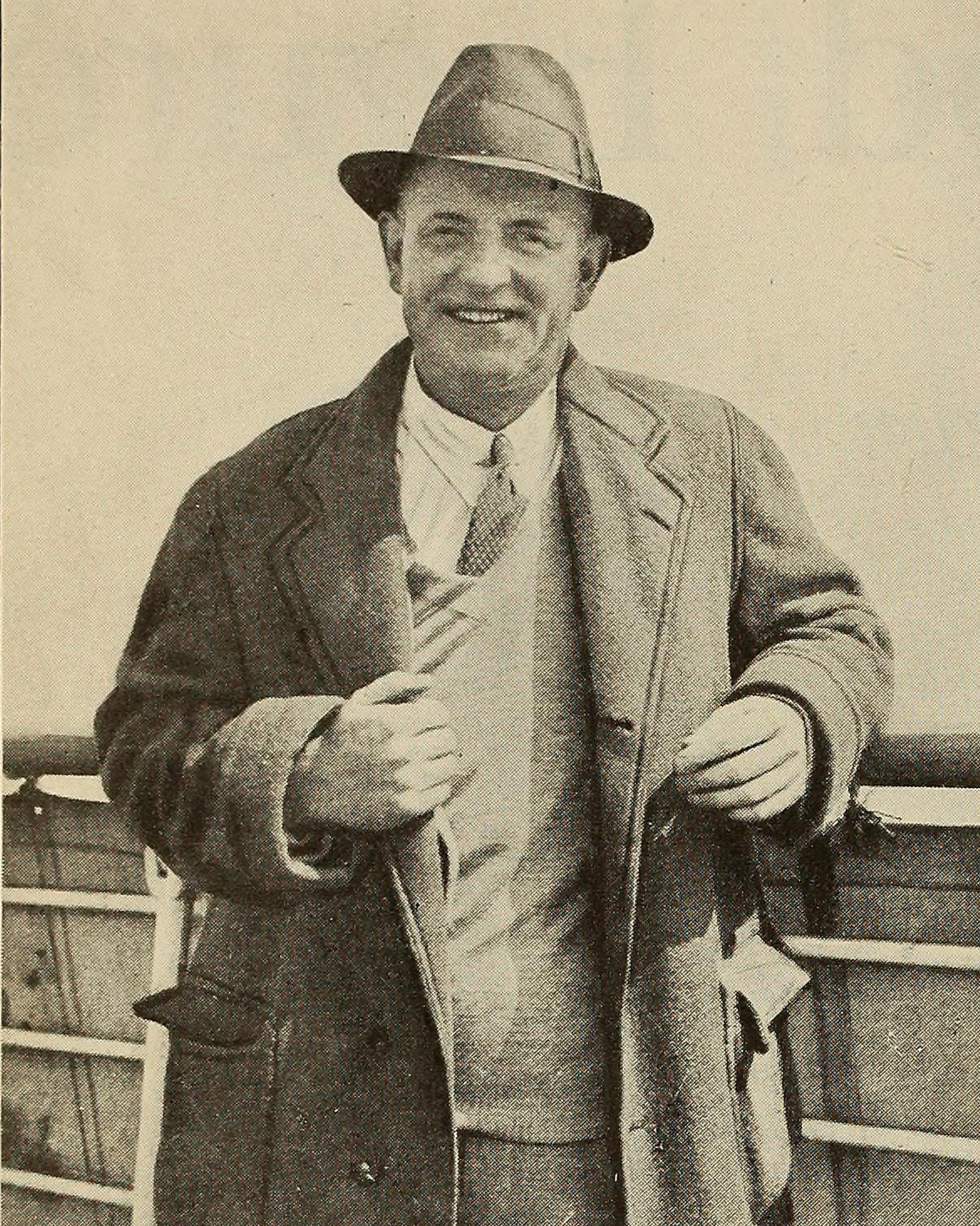
  P. G. Wodehouse
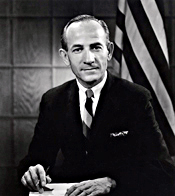
  Congressman Pettis
  - P. G. Wodehouse (Sir Pelham Grenville Wodehouse), 93, English humorist and novelist known for creating the character of the quintessential butler and servant, "Jeeves", in a series of short stories and novels, starting in 1915.
  - Julian Huxley, 87, English biologist and eugenicist
  - Jerry Pettis, 58, U.S. Congressman from California since 1967, and deputy minority whip for the Republican Party in Congress, was killed while flying his own private plane from Palm Springs, California toward San Bernardino, where he was to hold a press conference at a meeting of the state Public Utilities Commission. Midway through a 30-minute flight, Pettis encountered strong winds and his Beechwood Bonanza plane struck a hillside at the San Gorgonio Pass near Beaumont. His wife, Shirley Neil Pettis, who had been waiting at San Bernardino to meet his plane, would later win a special election to fill the vacant seat for California' 37th District, and would serve until 1979.
  - Khfaf Lasuria, Soviet centenarian whom the TASS News Agency claimed to have lived to age 139. Nine years earlier (and reportedly only 125 years old), Mrs. Khfaf had been profiled in LIFE magazine.

== February 15, 1975 (Saturday) ==
- The first acquisition, in 50 years, of new territory and inhabitants by the United States, took place with the signing of the "Covenant to Establish a Commonwealth of the Northern Mariana Islands in Political Union with the United States of America." The covenant would be approved in a plebiscite by the Islands' voters on June 17.
- Dr. Kenneth C. Edelin was convicted of manslaughter by a Boston jury after performing an abortion on October 3, 1973, at the city hospital. The jury, which sat for six weeks of trial, cited photographs of the 20- to 24-week-old fetus as a factor in the conviction, while Dr. Edelin, who was black, cited racial and religious bias from the all-white, and mostly Roman Catholic, jury. Dr. Edelin was placed on one year's probation.
- The descendants of chewing gum magnate William Wrigley, Jr., gave most of the privately owned Santa Catalina Island to a conservancy that the family had formed in 1972 to protect the island for public use.
- Died: Elizabeth Kee, 79, the first woman U.S. representative from West Virginia in Congress, who represented West Virginia from 1951 to 1965.
- Died: Charles Basil Price, 85, a Canadian Army general who served in World War I and World War II.

== February 16, 1975 (Sunday) ==
- At a meeting in Cape Town, South African Prime Minister B. J. Vorster informed visiting Prime Minister Ian Smith of Rhodesia that the white minority government of South Africa would no longer provide troops to protect Rhodesia's white minority government. Smith, who had been reassured earlier of the Vorster government's support, said later that the decision had struck him "like a bolt from the blue". Rhodesia's government would fall in 1979, as a black majority government took power and the nation was renamed Zimbabwe.
- HMS Sheffield, a guided missile destroyer, was commissioned into service in the British Royal Navy. The ship would be sunk by the Argentine Navy in May 1982 during the Falklands War, with a loss of 20 lives.
- Benny Parsons captured his first and only Daytona 500 victory as leader David Pearson spun out with 2 laps to go in NASCAR's premier race in front of a national television audience.
- Died: Morgan Taylor, 71, American Olympic hurdler and 1924 gold medalist

== February 17, 1975 (Monday) ==
- The Australian heavy metal band AC/DC released its first album, High Voltage, on the Albert Productions label.
- Georgia voted against approval of the proposed Equal Rights Amendment to the United States Constitution, and Utah followed the next day, with ratification failing 21-54 in the Utah House of Representatives.
- Died: George E. Marshall, 83, American film director, known for How the West Was Won

== February 18, 1975 (Tuesday) ==
- The first major protest against the building of a nuclear power plant took place in the city of Wyhl in West Germany, where several hundred people turned out at the site of a proposed reactor that had been authorized on January 22. After the eviction of the protesters, a larger demonstration would take place five days later.
- The Tigrayan People's Liberation Front was created to fight for the rights of the Tigre people in Ethiopia.
- The Constitutional Court of Italy ruled that abortion was legal if the physical or psychological health of the mother was threatened by an early pregnancy.
- Born:
  - Gary Neville, English footballer, in Bury
  - Keith Gillespie, Northern Irish footballer, in Larne
  - Sarah Brown, American soap opera actress and 3-time Daytime Emmy award winner, in Eureka, California

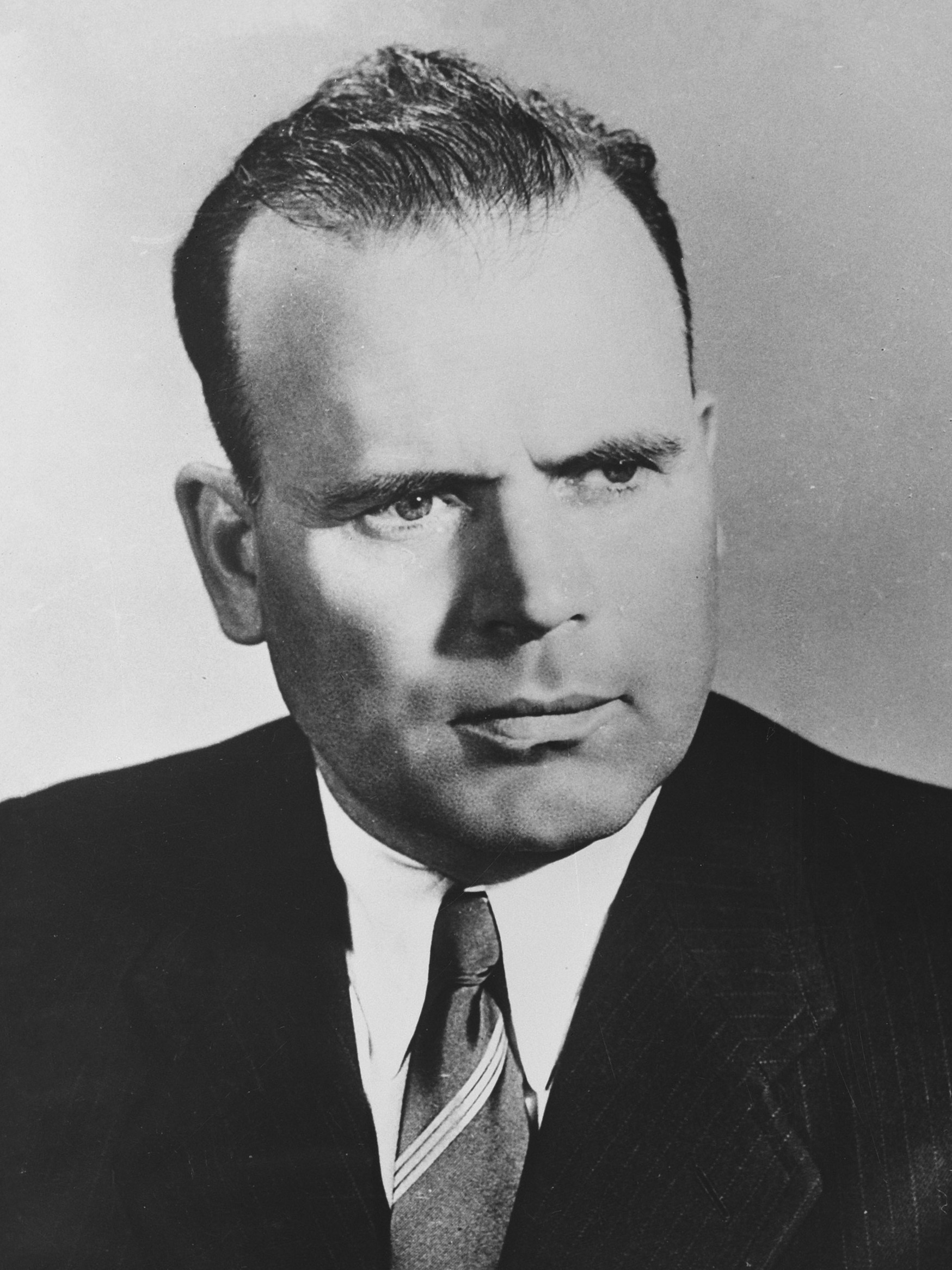
Stoica

- Died: Chivu Stoica, 66, former Prime Minister of Romania (1955–1961) and President (1965–1967), committed suicide after being called before Romanian Communist Party officials and accused of incest with his niece.

== February 19, 1975 (Wednesday) ==
- Significant reforms to the U.S. Freedom of Information Act went into effect, after both the House and the Senate had overridden a veto by President Ford in November.
- Died: Luigi Dallapiccola, 71, Italian composer

== February 20, 1975 (Thursday) ==
- The remaining 150 protesters who had occupied the proposed nuclear power plant site in Wyhl, West Germany, were attacked and dispersed by 700 German riot police, using water cannons, dogs and armored vehicles. Three days later, the site was reoccupied by more than 20,000 protesters.
- Born: Brian Littrell, American pop singer (Backstreet Boys), in Lexington, Kentucky
- Died: Robert Strauss, 61, American film actor known for the 1953 prisoner of war camp film Stalag 17.

== February 21, 1975 (Friday) ==
- Former U.S. Attorney General John N. Mitchell, former Chief of Staff H. R. Haldeman, and former presidential adviser John Ehrlichman were each sentenced to a minimum of 2 1/2 years, in prison by U.S. District Judge John J. Sirica. All three had been convicted in January of obstruction of justice charges in connection with the Watergate scandal. Mitchell joked with reporters about his famous wife, from whom he was separated, saying, "It could have been a hell of a lot worse. He could have sentenced me to spend the rest of my life with Martha Mitchell."
- Born: Affirmed, American thoroughbred racehorse and 1978 winner of the U.S. Triple Crown of horse racing; near Ocala, Florida (d. 2001)
- Died: Joseph Lortz, 87, German Roman Catholic theologian and Nazi sympathizer

== February 22, 1975 (Saturday) ==
- Twenty-seven people, most of them skiers on vacation, were killed in Norway when two express trains collided between Oslo and Trondheim. The train from Oslo was running late, and failed to yield to the train from Trondheim at the station at Tretten. Among the dead was Toennes Andenaes.
- Born: Drew Barrymore, American film actress, in Culver City, California
- Died:
  - Oskar Perron, 94, German mathematician and authority on non-Euclidean geometry
  - Lionel Tertis, 98, British musician who composed the first works for the viola

== February 23, 1975 (Sunday) ==
- Daylight saving time began in the United States two months earlier than usual, as a result of a 1974 vote in Congress to amend the 1973 Emergency Year-Round Daylight Saving Time Act. In response to the 1973 energy crisis, Congress had passed emergency legislation to move clocks ahead one hour on January 6, 1974 and to leave them there until April 27, 1975, with no provision for a "fall back" to standard time in October. Following complaints, Congress voted to allow clocks to be turned back, as originally scheduled in October, albeit for only four months rather than six.
- Three days after West German police had dispersed a crowd of 150 people from the Wyhl proposed nuclear power plant site, more than 28,000 protesters arrived to carry on the occupation. For years thereafter, a core group would occupy the site, supplemented by more protesters on the weekends, before Wyhl was finally abandoned.

== February 24, 1975 (Monday) ==
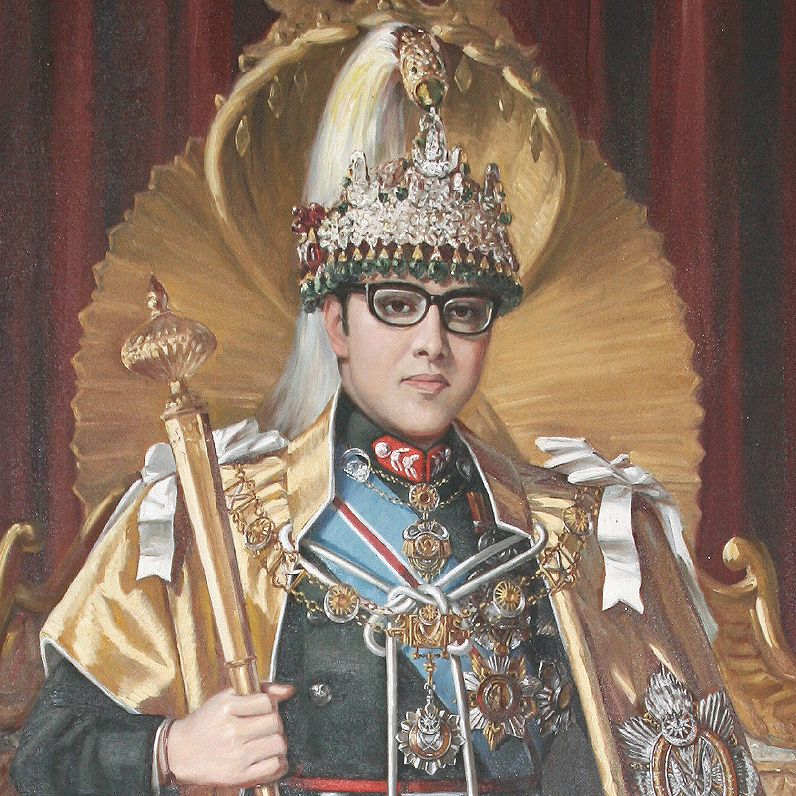
A portrait of King Birendra at his coronation

- The coronation of Birendra Bir Bikram Shah Deva, who had been King of Nepal since the death of his father on January 31, 1972, took place in Kathmandu at exactly 8:37 a.m. local time, a moment that had been pre-determined by the royal astrologers. The elaborate ceremony was attended by 50,000 people, including representatives from 58 nations.
- The English rock band Led Zeppelin released their sixth album Physical Graffiti, on the Swan Song Records label.
- Died: Nikolai Bulganin, 79, Premier of the Soviet Union from 1955 to 1958. After being deposed as Chairman of the Council of Ministers by the Communist Party Politburo in 1958, and replaced by First Secretary Nikita Khrushchev, Bulganin lived in the rest of his life in Moscow, on a government pension, and was ignored by the Soviet press. His death was announced in a single paragraph in the government newspaper Izvestia, and no observation was made by the party or the government of his funeral. Time magazine summed up Bulganin's condemnation to obscurity with the article title "Death of an Un-Person".

== February 25, 1975 (Tuesday) ==
- West Germany's federal constitutional court ruled, 6-2, that the nation's 1974 abortion law, which permitted termination of pregnancy on demand within the first trimester of pregnancy, was a violation of constitutional guarantees of "the right to life and physical inviolability".
- Philippine President Ferdinand Marcos ended the hijacking of a Philippine Airlines flight by telling hijacker Emilio Abarra that "he would be pardoned for whatever crimes he committed". Abarca and his accomplice, Cesar Meland (who was not pardoned), then released their 15 hostages and surrendered to authorities. Afterward, Major General Fidel Ramos said that Abarca's pardon included all crimes except for the hijacking itself.

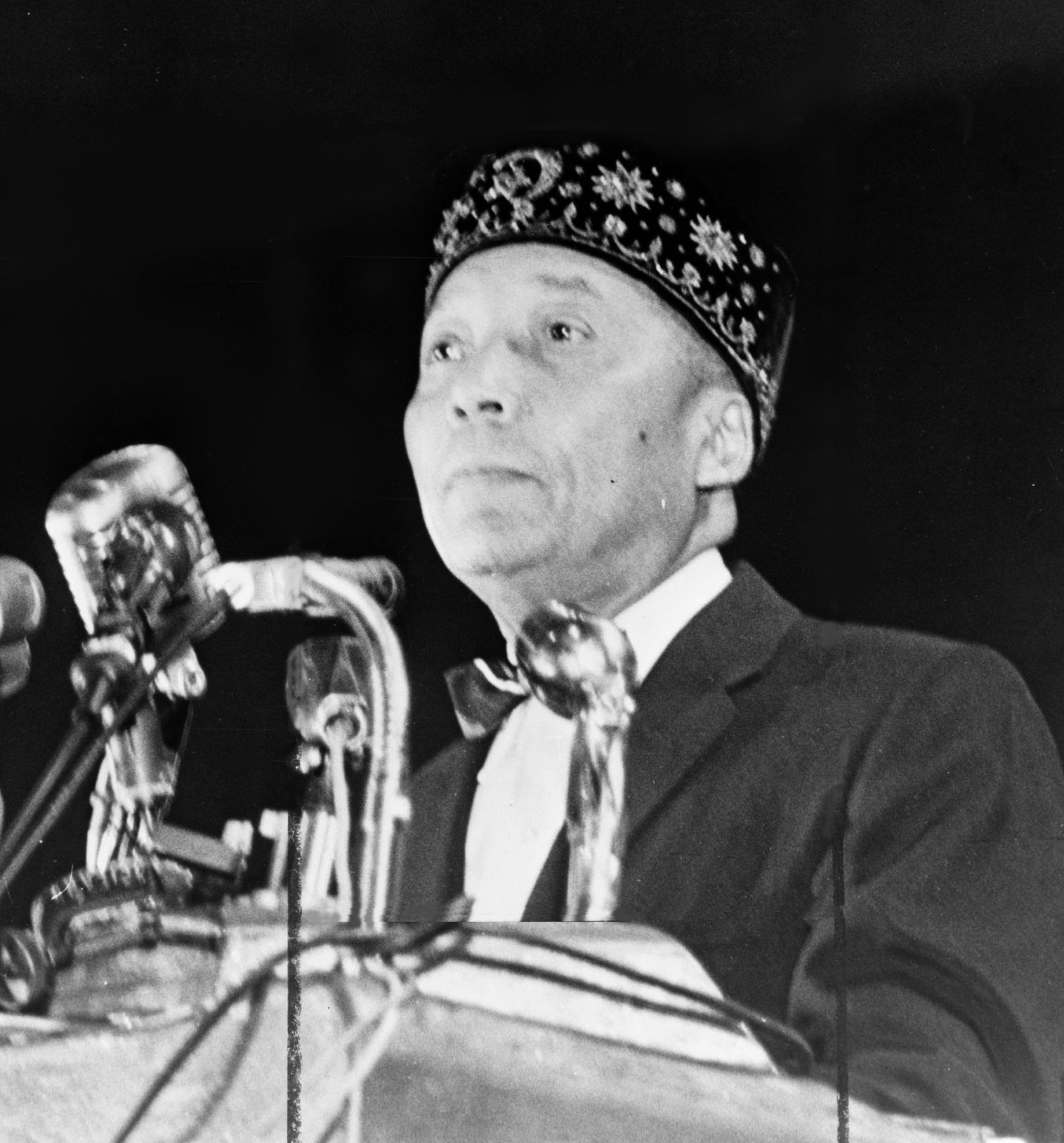
Elijah Muhammad in 1964

- Died: Elijah Muhammad, 77, African-American Nation of Islam leader. Born Elijah Poole, he had spread the "Black Muslim" movement founded by W. D. Fard. He was succeeded by his son, Warith Deen Mohammed, who would renounce the teaching that white people were "devils", and would move to bring the Nation of Islam closer to other Muslim communities in the United States, changing the name of the organization to the American Muslim Mission. Louis Farrakhan, who had been viewed as a potential successor to Elijah Muhammad, would break with Warith Mohammed and name his group the Nation of Islam. Warith Deen Mohammed.

== February 26, 1975 (Wednesday) ==
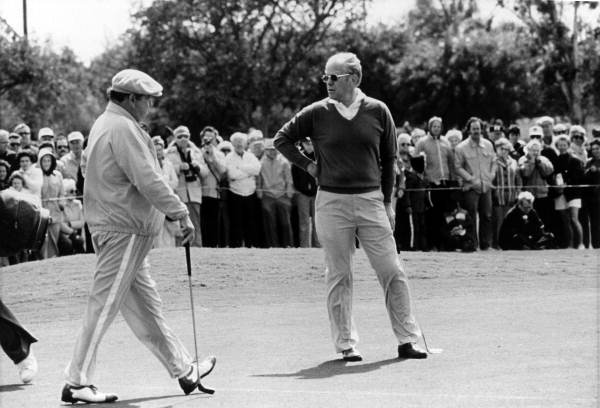
Jackie Gleason and President Ford on the PGA circuit

- Gerald Ford became the first incumbent U.S. President to play in a PGA golf tournament, as an amateur in a pro-am event, the Jackie Gleason-Inverrary Classic. A crowd of 41,720 (largest for a single day on a PGA Tour event) watched as the President shot 100 on 18 holes, in partnership with Jack Nicklaus, Jackie Gleason, Bob Hope and New York businessman Elliot Kahn who donated $10,000 (equivalent to more than $60,000 in fifty years later) for the right to play golf in Florida with the celebrities.
- Samuel Lee Kountz Jr. an African-American kidney transplantation surgeon performed the first televised kidney transplant on NBC’s “Today Show.” Intended to raise awareness of the plight of waiting kidney recipients, it did exactly that – by some estimates, 20-thousand people called in to NBC and offered to donate their kidney.

== February 27, 1975 (Thursday) ==
- The Movement 2 June kidnapped Peter Lorenz, leader of the Christian Democratic Union party in West Berlin and a candidate for the city's governing assembly. Lorenz, who would have become the city's Mayor if the CDU had obtained a majority of seats in the city council, was re-elected to his seat and was released unharmed on March 4 after most of the kidnappers' demands were met.
- A blaze at the Manhattan switching station of the New York Telephone Company caused what was described at the time as "the biggest and longest burning fire the city had ever seen", knocking out telephone service on 300 blocks in the financial district and surrounding residences. While emergency phone service was restored (with mobile equipment trailers) to businesses, most of the nearly 145,000 phones affected were without service for 23 days.
- The Wall Street Journal broke the front-page story "Social Security System Is on Way to Going Broke, Analysts Warn", noting that payments from the 40-year-old American Social Security system had finally become greater than the income received from payroll taxes. When the program began in 1935 for retirement, economists had forecast that Congress might have to appropriate new money by 1980 to close the deficit.
- NSC 68, the document of the National Security Council that had guided U.S. policy against the Soviet Union beginning in April 1950, was declassified by the U.S. Department of State after almost 25 years.

== February 28, 1975 (Friday) ==
- In the worst disaster in the 112-year history of London's underground subway system, 43 people were killed when their six-car train sped past its stop at London's Moorgate station and crashed into a wall.
- In Lomé, the capital of Togo, the European Economic Community and 46 African, Caribbean and Pacific countries signed a financial and economic treaty, known as the first Lomé Convention.
- The AMC Pacer automobile was introduced by American Motors. Manufactured at the AMC plant in Kenosha, Wisconsin, it would remain in production until December 3, 1979.
- Died: Neville Cardus, English cricket and music writer (b. 1888)
