= April 1975 =

Month of 1975

<<	April 1975					>>
Su	Mo	Tu	We	Th	Fr	Sa
		1	2	3	4	5
6	7	8	9	10	11	12
13	14	15	16	17	18	19
20	21	22	23	24	25	26
27	28	29	30

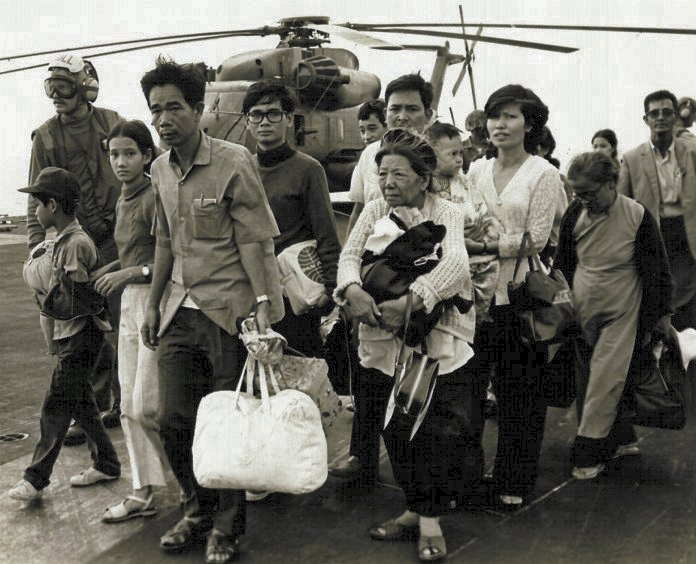
April 30, 1975: South Vietnam government falls to the North Vietnamese

The following events occurred in April 1975:

== April 1, 1975 (Tuesday) ==
- Neak Leung fell to Khmer Rouge insurgency, cutting off a critical supply line to the Cambodian capital of Phnom Penh. Cambodia's President Lon Nol left that nation forever, eventually settling in Hawaii. Senate President Saukam Khoy took over from Lon Nol as President of Cambodia, serving until April 12, when he was able to escape the approaching Khmer Rouge on the same helicopter as the American ambassador.
- The American "Freedom Train" began its tour of the United States in celebration of the United States Bicentennial, starting with a display in Wilmington, Delaware, and then proceeding westward. After reaching San Diego on January 14, the train began its return trip, stopping in Harrisburg, Pennsylvania, on July 4, 1976, and finishing its tour on December 31 in Miami. In all, 7,000,000 visitors would see the train and its exhibits.
- Died: George Parr, 74, Texas politician known as "The Duke of Duval", by suicide. His manipulation of election results in Duval County, Texas, helped future U.S. President Lyndon B. Johnson become a U.S. Senator for Texas in 1948.

== April 2, 1975 (Wednesday) ==
- The CN Tower was topped off at 1,185.4 feet or 553.33 meters in height, as the last section was put into place by a helicopter, making the building the largest free-standing structure in the world. The Tower would open on June 26, 1976.
- A bus, carrying French pilgrims on its way back from Notre Dame de la Salette to Loiret, lost its brakes, then plunged 80 feet into a ravine near Vizille, killing 27 people.
- Born:
  - Pedro Pascal, Chilean-American actor, in Santiago, Chile
  - Adam Rodríguez, American TV actor (Eric Delko on CSI: Miami) in Yonkers, New York
- Died: Dong Biwu, 89 Vice Chairman of the People's Republic of China since 1959

== April 3, 1975 (Thursday) ==
- Bobby Fischer refused to play in a chess match against Anatoly Karpov in Manila, turning down a chance to receive at least $1,500,000 and becoming the first world chess champion to voluntarily give up his title. At Amsterdam, the FIDE voted to award Karpov the world chess championship title. Fischer had not defended the title since winning it in 1972, and Karpov became the new champ "without moving a pawn".
- At the request of John Gunther Dean, the American ambassador to Cambodia, U.S. President Ford ordered the evacuation of all Americans from Phnom Penh.
- Israel and South Africa signed SECMENT, a secret mutual defense agreement, following a meeting in Jerusalem between the defense ministers, P. W. Botha of South Africa and Shimon Peres of Israel.
- Born:
  - Koji Uehara, Japanese star baseball pitcher, Central League Rookie of the Year 1999; later a relief pitcher for MLB Orioles and Rangers, in Neyagawa; and
  - Yoshinobu Takahashi, Japanese baseball outfielder, in Chiba. Both Uehara and Takahashi won the Mitsui Golden Glove Award multiple times while playing for the Yomiuri Giants.
- Died: Mary Ure, 42, Scottish film actress and wife of actor Robert Shaw, died of an overdose of alcohol and barbiturates.

== April 4, 1975 (Friday) ==
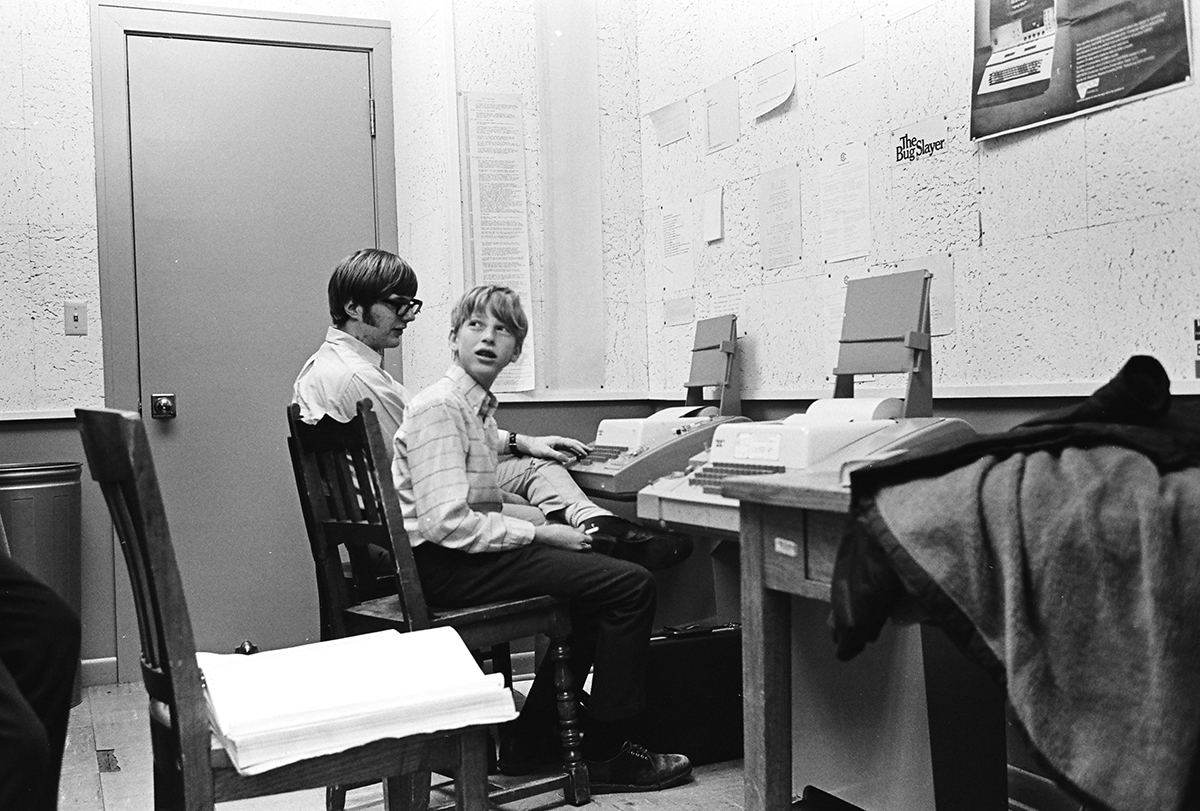
Bill Gates and Paul Allen

- Bill Gates and Paul Allen incorporated Micro-Soft, Inc., in Albuquerque, New Mexico.
- The first military Operation Babylift flight, C5A 80218, crashed 27 minutes after takeoff, killing 144 of the 305 people on board, including 78 of the 243 children. Two cargo doors blew off of the jet, largest in the world at the time, as it reached 23,000 feet during the evacuation of civilians in the closing days of the Vietnam War.
- South Vietnam premier Tran Thien Khiem resigned, and was replaced by Nguyễn Bá Cẩn.
- For the first time since the 1973 War Powers Resolution had taken effect, an American President delivered the required report to Congress about military action. President Ford advised of his sending of U.S. Marines, ships, and helicopters to evacuate refugees from South Vietnam.
- At least 20 people were killed and 80 injured in the Lithuanian SSR, in what is still the worst rail disaster in Lithuania. At 5:35 in the evening local time, near the village of Žasliai, passenger Train 513 on the Vilnius–Kaunas Railway hit a cargo train from behind, rupturing a tank car which had not fully been pulled off the main track. The locomotive and the first passenger car of Train 513 derailed, but the third car and its passengers slid into the fire, which spread to two other passenger cars.
- Born:
  - Delphine Arnault, French billionaire businesswoman and executive vice president of the Louis Vuitton company; in Neuilly-sur-Seine
  - Scott Rolen, American MLB third baseman, NL Rookie of the Year 1997; in Evansville, Indiana
- Died: Pierre Galopin, 43, French Army Commandant and negotiator who had been kidnapped on August 4 by rebels while in Chad, was hanged after the trial by the rebels.

== April 5, 1975 (Saturday) ==
- The Soviet crewed space mission Soyuz 18a ended in failure during its ascent into orbit when a critical malfunction occurred when the third stage of the booster rocket failed to separate. The spacecraft and cosmonauts, Vasily Lazarev and Oleg Makarov, landed in Mongolia and their Soyuz spacecraft having to be ripped free from the vehicle.
- The first Super Sentai series, Himitsu Sentai Gorenger, is premiered.

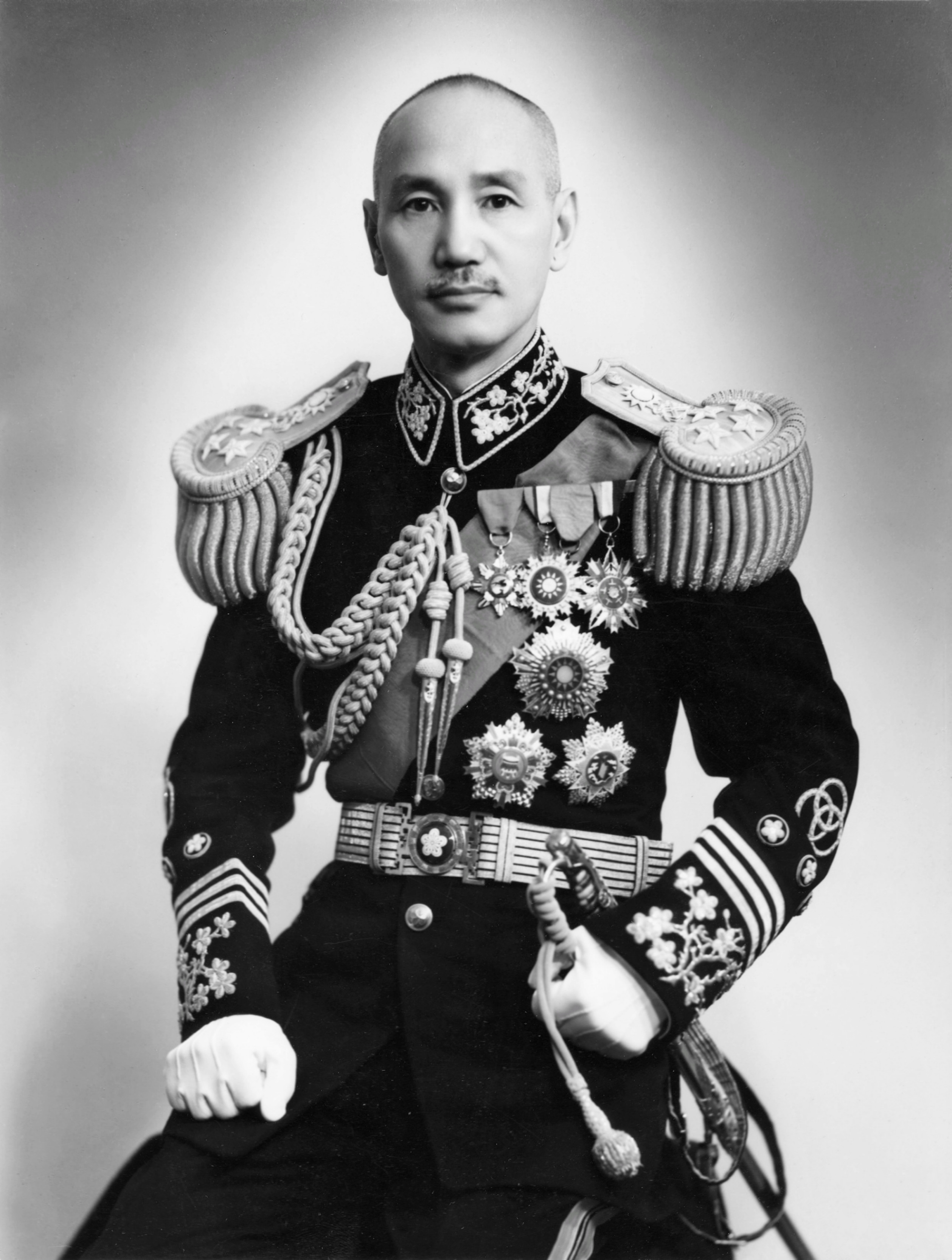
Chiang Kai-Shek

- Died:
  - Chiang Kai-shek, 87, President of the Republic of China, who later relocated to the island of Taiwan after the Communist takeover of the mainland.
  - Harold Osborn, 75, American track athlete, decathlon winner in 1924 Olympics

== April 6, 1975 (Sunday) ==
- Yen Chia-kan was sworn in as the new President of Nationalist China, as a 30-day period of official mourning began for the late Chiang Kai-shek.
- With the conquest of South Vietnam imminent, elections were held in North Vietnam for the 492 seats available in the National Assembly. All 492 candidates were unopposed members of the Vietnamese Fatherland Front.
- Born: Zach Braff, American TV actor (Dr. John Dorian on Scrubs); in South Orange, New Jersey
- Died: Ernst Bergmann, 71, Israeli atomic scientist

== April 7, 1975 (Monday) ==
- Cambodia's Prime Minister Long Boret met with representatives of the Khmer Rouge while in Bangkok, Thailand. He returned to Cambodia the next day, refused to leave when officials were offered a chance to escape, and was executed nine days later by the new regime.
- Beverly Sills, the most famous of American opera singers of her day, made her first appearance at "The Met".
- Born:
  - Ronde Barber, American NFL cornerback for the Tampa Bay Buccaneers, and
  - Tiki Barber, American NFL running back for the New York Giants, identical twins in Roanoke, Virginia

== April 8, 1975 (Tuesday) ==
- Frank Robinson became the first African-American to manage a Major League Baseball team. Robinson, who was both manager and a player for the Cleveland Indians, placed himself into the lineup as a designated hitter, and hit a home run in his first at-bat, to help the Indians beat the Yankees 5–3.
- At the Academy Awards, Art Carney won Best Actor for Harry and Tonto, Ellen Burstyn won Best Actress for Alice Doesn't Live Here Anymore, and The Godfather Part II became the first sequel to win an Oscar for Best Picture.
- In an interview on the CBS Morning News, U.S. Senator Barry Goldwater said that the Vietnam War "would have been over in a month" if he had been elected president in 1964.
- Josephine Baker danced before a crowd of celebrities at the Bobino Theatre in Paris. Days later, the African-American dancer who had become a beloved citizen of France, had a cerebral hemorrhage and died on April 12 at the age of 68.

== April 9, 1975 (Wednesday) ==
- The Philippine Basketball Association, Asia's first professional basketball league, played its first game before a crowd of 18,000 at the Araneta Coliseum in Quezon City, with the Mariwasa-Noritake Porcelain Makers defeating the Concepcion Carriers, 101 to 98 in the opener of a doubleheader, followed by the Toyota Comets' 105–101 defeat of the Universal Textile Weavers. Gregorio Dionisio of the Carriers scored the first basket.
- The National Association of Broadcasters voted 12–3 to designate the first hour of weeknight network television as "Family Viewing Hour, starting with the 1975–76 season.
- Eight people in South Korea, who were involved in the People's Revolutionary Party Incident, were hanged. The executions came the day after President Park ordered Korea University closed.
- The Battle of Xuân Lộc, the last major battle of the Vietnam War, began. South Vietnamese forces held out against superior North Vietnamese forces before finally withdrawing on April 19.
- Troops from the Indian Army invaded the Kingdom of Sikkim in response to an appeal by the Himalayan kingdom's prime minister and disarmed the 400 guards of the King of Sikkim at his palace in Gangtok. The King (Chogyal) Palden Thondup Namgyal was confined to the royal palace under house arrest.
- Born: Robbie Fowler, British footballer and fourth highest goalscorer in Premier League history; in Liverpool
- Died: "Joey", 34, the world's oldest canary. Joey spent his entire life in a cage at the home of a Mrs. Ross in Hull, England.

== April 10, 1975 (Thursday) ==
- The legislature for the Kingdom of Sikkim, located in the Himalayan Mountains, voted to abolish the monarchy and to make the nation one of the states of India.
- Lee Elder became the first African-American golfer to play in the Masters' Tournament
- Born:
  - David Harbour, American film actor known for Hellboy and Stranger Things; in White Plains, New York
  - Matthew Phillips, New Zealand native who later became a player for the Italy national rugby union team; in Kaitaia
- Died:
  - Marjorie Main, 85, American actress best known as Phoebe "Ma" Kettle in ten "Ma and Pa Kettle" films between 1947 and 1957
  - Walker Evans, 71, American photographer

== April 11, 1975 (Friday) ==
- North Vietnam took control of six of the Spratly Islands which had been under the control of South Vietnam, but had also been claimed by the People's Republic of China. The dispute between the two Communist nations over ownership of the tiny islands would be one of several factors in the war between China and Vietnam in 1979.

== April 12, 1975 (Saturday) ==
- Operation Eagle Pull started as the United States closed its embassy in Cambodia, and began the evacuation of all American citizens. American military helicopters from the aircraft carrier USS Hancock, and 180 U.S. Marines from the amphibious assault ship USS Okinawa, arrived at Phnom Penh. There was no interference from the Khmer Rouge during the rescue.
- ARVN General Staff sends numbers of South Vietnamese fighter-bombers to slow down or halt PAVN units to attempt major ambushes and attacks at the highway and at Xuan Loc. South Vietnamese fighter bombers uses 80-120 sorties per day to stiff strong resistance.
- Died: Josephine Baker, 68, African-American dancer who attained fame in France and then worldwide

== April 13, 1975 (Sunday) ==
- In Lebanon, snipers of the Christian Phalangist Kataeb militia attacked a bus carrying Muslim Palestinians to the inauguration of a new mosque in the Beirut suburb of Ain El Remmeneh, killing 27 and wounding 18. The attack, which came soon after an assassination attempt against Phalangist leader Pierre Gemayel that killed four of his bodyguards, triggered a new civil war that would last for more than 15 years.
- François (Ngarta) Tombalbaye, 56, who had been President of Chad since 1960, was assassinated in a coup d'état by soldiers led by General Félix Malloum.
- The first victim of the Trash Bag Murders was found in California near San Juan Capistrano, and identified as 21-year-old Albert Rivera. The murders would continue until March 13, 1977, when a 17-year-old boy disappeared after meeting a friend identified as David Hill. Hill and his roommate, Patrick Kearney, would turn themselves into the Riverside County Sheriff on July 1, 1977. Kearney would confess to 28 murders, dating back to 1968, while Hill would plead guilty to three.
- Born: Bruce Dyer, English footballer who became the first "£1 million-teenager" in 1994, for Crystal Palace; in Ilford
- Died: Larry Parks, 60, American film actor nominated for an Oscar in 1946, and blacklisted in 1951

== April 14, 1975 (Monday) ==
- "No-frills service" began for airline passengers in the United States, as National Airlines began offering a 35 percent discount off the air fare for passengers who were willing to give up airline food and drink service. Four other airlines-- American, Continental, Eastern and Delta began offering discount service the same day. All five had obtained permission from the Civil Aeronautics Board.
- The Federal Election Commission, created on October 15, 1974, began operations with the swearing in of six commissioners by U.S. President Ford.
- Voters in the ancient Himalayan kingdom of Sikkim overwhelmingly approved abolishing that nation's monarchy and merging with neighboring India. The final result was 59,637 in favor and only 1,496 against.
- A Chorus Line, which would go on to become a long running Broadway musical, was first performed, at the New York Shakespeare Festival.
- Born:
  - Amy Dumas, American professional wrestler, in Fort Lauderdale, billed as "Lita"
  - Anderson Silva, Brazilian UFC fighter and boxer, World Middleweight Champion since 2006, in São Paulo
  - Stefano Miceli, Italian conductor and pianist, in Brindisi
- Died:
  - Fredric March, 77, American film actor, Academy Award winner for Best Actor in 1932 and 1946
  - Clyde Tolson, 74, associate director of the FBI, second only to J. Edgar Hoover

== April 15, 1975 (Tuesday) ==
- Karen Ann Quinlan, 21, collapsed after drinking several gin and tonics in addition to having already taken the tranquilizers Valium and Darvon. She would become the subject of a landmark case in the "right to die" movement, In re Quinlan. After a Massachusetts court ruled that a person could be taken off life support in cases where there was no prospect of recovery, she would be removed from the respirator on May 22, 1976. To the surprise of most people, Quinlan was able to breathe on her own, and would live, comatose, for another nine years. She would die on June 11, 1985, at the age of 31.
- The leftist government of Portugal nationalized most of that nation's basic industries and began a land reform program.
- Died: Richard Conte, 65, American actor

== April 16, 1975 (Wednesday) ==
- Alexander Shelepin, at one time considered a successor to Leonid Brezhnev as leader of the Soviet Union, was removed from his position on the 16 member Politburo of the Soviet Communist Party.
- Air Force Marshal Hosni Mubarak was named as Vice President of Egypt by President Anwar Sadat, replacing Hussein el-Shafei, who had served in the post since 1961. Mubarak would begin a 29-year rule as president after the 1981 assassination of Sadat.

== April 17, 1975 (Thursday) ==
- The Cambodian Civil War came to an end when Khmer Rouge guerrillas captured Phnom Penh. That evening the Khmer Rouge directed the residents to leave the city for the countryside.
- Former U.S. Treasury Secretary John B. Connally was acquitted of all charges by a federal jury in a bribery trial in Washington. Connally, who had been wounded during the assassination of President Kennedy in 1963, then later switched from the Democrats to the Republicans, had been under consideration by Richard M. Nixon as successor to Vice-president Agnew in 1973, but was bypassed in favor of Gerald Ford, who became president upon Nixon's resignation.
- Born: Lee Hyun-il, South Korean badminton player, in Seoul
- Died: Sarvepalli Radhakrishnan, 86, President of India from 1962 to 1967

== April 18, 1975 (Friday) ==
- The first acidophilus milk was introduced at a luncheon at North Carolina State University. "Sweet Acidophilus", a dairy product for people with a lactose intolerance, had been made through the co-operation of the university, the North Carolina Dairy Foundation, and Miles Laboratories, with Miles producing the lactobacillus acidophilus bacteria cultures that aided in the breakdown of lactose sugar.
- The 200th anniversary of the midnight ride of Paul Revere (celebrated in Henry Wadsworth Longfellow's 1860 poem as having occurred "on the eighteenth of April, in Seventy-Five") was observed in Boston's North End neighborhood. U.S. President Ford visited the Old North Church, where two signal lanterns had been placed on April 18, 1775, and lit a third lamp to symbolize the start of "America's third century".
- Died: Hang Thun Hak, 48, former Prime Minister of Cambodia (1972–1973), was executed by the Khmer Rouge.

== April 19, 1975 (Saturday) ==
- Aryabhata, India's first satellite, was launched into orbit from the Soviet Union. The Indian Space Research Organisation would begin launches from India (at the space center in Sriharikota, Andhra Pradesh) in 1980.
- The Cambodian genocide began two days after the fall of Phnom Penh, as the new Khmer Rouge regime announced that all former government employees, including soldiers, military officers, and policemen, would be required to register with the new local authorities. Those who complied with the order were told that they would be sent for "reeducation" at a camp in Battambang on April 28.
- South Vietnamese forces withdrew from the town of Xuan Loc in the last major battle of the Vietnam War.
- Foolish Pleasure captured the Wood Memorial and one month later he would win the Kentucky Derby.
- Born: Jason Gillespie, Australian cricketer nicknamed "Dizzy", in Sydney
- Died: Percy Lavon Julian, 76, African-American inventor, biochemist and entrepreneur who developed synthetic cortisone.

== April 20, 1975 (Sunday) ==
- Taman Mini Indonesia Indah, a 250-acre cultural theme park that was envisioned by First Lady Ibu Tien as "Indonesia on a miniature scale", was opened at East Jakarta, to illustrate the many cultures of the nation of more than 200,000,000 people.
- Krishna Balaram Mandir, the main temple for the International Society for Krishna Consciousness (ISKCON), was opened in Vrindavan, in the Uttar Pradesh State of India, by ISKCON founder Srila Prabhupada
- Born: Michael Santiago Render, American rap artist nicknamed "Killer Mike", in Atlanta

== April 21, 1975 (Monday) ==
- South Vietnam's President Nguyễn Văn Thiệu resigned and was succeeded by Vice-president Trần Văn Hương. Five days later, Thieu would flee to Taiwan, then move on to Thailand, followed by London. He would die in Newton, Massachusetts, on September 29, 2001.
- The CBU-55, at the time, was described as "the most powerful non-nuclear weapon in the U.S. arsenal", was used in combat for the first and only time. A Republic of Vietnam Air Force C-130 dropped the fuel bomb, which consumed all oxygen within a radius of 70 meters, killing 250 North Vietnamese troops near Xuân Lộc, capital of Bình Tuy Province. Despite a stiff resistance by the south, the province would fall later in the day.
- Members of the Symbionese Liberation Army, which had kidnapped newspaper heiress Patty Hearst on February 4, 1974, robbed a branch of the Crocker National Bank in Carmichael, California. Unlike previous bank robberies by the SLA, the group killed a bystander, Myrna Opsahl, a 42-year-old mother of four, who had been at the bank depositing money collected by her church from the previous day's services. Hearst was identified later as the driver of the getaway car.
- Died: Long Boret, 42, Prime Minister of the Khmer Republic since 1973, and Sisowath Sirik Matak, 61, Prime Minister from 1971 to 1972, two of the seven "supertraitors" designated by the Khmer Rouge for trial and execution, were put to death after choosing to remain in Cambodia rather than to evacuate.

== April 22, 1975 (Tuesday) ==
- Oswaldo López Arellano was removed from office as President of Honduras by order of the Central American nation's high military council. López was presumed to have been the unidentified "official in Honduras" who had been referred to in the April 9 Wall Street Journal as recipient of a $1,250,000 bribe from the United Brands Company in return for cutting a Honduran export tax on bananas, and was replaced by General Juan Alberto Melgar Castro.
- Born:
  - Carlos Sastre, Spanish bicycle racer and 2008 Tour de France winner, in Leganés
  - Greg Moore, Canadian race car driver, in Maple Ridge, British Columbia (killed in racing accident, 1999)

== April 23, 1975 (Wednesday) ==
- Speaking to an audience of students at Tulane University in New Orleans, U.S. President Ford announced that "Today, America can regain the sense of pride that existed before Vietnam. But it cannot be achieved by re-fighting a war that is finished as far as America is concerned." Earlier in the day, the U.S. Senate had voted 75–17 to approve $250 million in humanitarian aid and use of U.S. troops to evacuate South Vietnam, but declined to take up Ford's request for any further military aid.
- Pol Pot, the rarely seen Khmer Rouge commander-in-chief and new leader of Cambodia, arrived at Phnom Penh to begin his revolutionary plans to build Democratic Kampuchea.
- Born:
  - Olga Kern, Russian classical pianist; as Olga Pushechnikova in Moscow
  - Jón Þór "Jónsi" Birgisson, Icelandic multi-instrumentalist and lead singer for the Icelandic band Sigur Rós; in Reykjavík
- Died: William Hartnell, 67, British actor who had been the first of 13 to portray Doctor Who in the show of the same name, from 1963 to 1966.

== April 24, 1975 (Thursday) ==
- Six terrorists of the Baader-Meinhof Gang (officially the "Red Army Faction") took over the West German embassy in Sweden, took 11 hostages, and demanded the release of 26 of the group's jailed members (including Andreas Baader and Ulrike Meinhof). Reversing prior West German policy, Chancellor Helmut Schmidt's government refused to give in to terrorist demands, offering nothing but an opportunity for the group to get away. In response, the group murdered two embassy employees, military attaché Andreas von Mirbach and Heinz Hillegaard. As Swedish commandos were preparing to storm the building, a terrorist bomb detonated, apparently accidentally, destroying the structure and allowing the hostages to escape after the 12-hour siege. Two of the six terrorists were fatally injured by their own bomb, and the others were captured while trying to leave. The event marked the beginning of the decline of domestic terrorism in West Germany.
- Colorado Attorney General Joyce Murdoch invalidated all six marriage licenses for same-sex marriage that had been issued by Boulder County Clerk Clela Rorex since March 26. Rorex had issued the first license to two men after being advised by the District Attorney that nothing in Colorado law prohibited a marriage between two people of the same gender.
- Polish Army Major Jerzy Pawlowski, who had won a gold medal in fencing representing Poland at the 1968 Summer Olympics, was arrested on charges of espionage in Warsaw. Pawlowski, who had worked for Poland's intelligence service since 1950, had been working since 1964 as an agent for the U.S. Central Intelligence Agency (CIA). He would be sentenced to 25 years imprisonment after a court-martial and released after the fall of the Communist government in 1989.
- Died: Pete Ham, 27, Welsh musician who led the group Badfinger, hanged himself.

== April 25, 1975 (Friday) ==
- Exactly one year after the "Carnation Revolution" that toppled the dictatorship in Portugal, the first multiparty elections there in almost 50 years were conducted. There was a 91.7% turnout of eligible voters, and fears that a Communist government would be voted into office in Western Europe were proven wrong. The Socialist Party, led by Mário Soares, won 116 of the 250 seats in the Constituent Assembly, and, Francisco de Sá Carneiro's Social Democrats won 81. Álvaro Cunhal and the Portuguese Communist Party obtained only 30 seats.
- Eight policemen, two bystanders and a bank teller were killed in Mexico City by members of the Liga Comunista 23 de Septiembre who raided a branch of the Banco de Comercio at Villa Coapa. As soon as the bank opened for the day, a dozen guerillas entered, killed six police who were guarding the bank. Unable to open the vault, the group took approximately US$16,000 from the tellers' drawers, then shot other people as they drove away.
- Born: Emily Bergl, British-American actress, in Milton Keynes, Buckinghamshire
- Died: Mike Brant (stage name for Moshe Michael Brand), popular Israeli singer and songwriter who attained fame in France, with seven number one hit records, committed suicide by jumping from the sixth floor of an apartment in Paris. Earlier in the day, the Sonopresse studio had released his latest album, Album souvenir.

== April 26, 1975 (Saturday) ==
- Boxer George Foreman, in his first ring appearance since losing the world heavyweight championship to Muhammad Ali (and 19 years away from winning the world title again), fought five different challengers in Toronto as part of a televised exhibition promoted by Don King as "Foreman versus Five". Rather than facing one challenger for 15 rounds, went up to 3 rounds with each fighter. The "Fearsome Fivesome" consisted of Alonzo Johnson, Jerry Judge, Terry Daniels, Charlie Polite, and Boone Kirkman, and each received $7,500 for appearing.
- Born: Joey Jordison, American musician (Slipknot), in Des Moines, Iowa (d. 2021)

== April 27, 1975 (Sunday) ==
- Duong Van Minh was unanimously (134–0) elected as President of South Vietnam by the National Assembly, and authorized to negotiate a peace agreement with the Viet Cong and with North Vietnam. "Big Minh" replaced Tran Van Huong, who had refused to step aside after a week as president, the next day.
- Born: Kazuyoshi Funaki, Japanese ski jumper and 1998 Olympic gold medalist; in Yoichi, Hokkaidō
- Died: John B. McKay, 52, U.S. Air Force test pilot, twelve years after sustaining serious injuries in the November 9, 1962, crash of an X-15 aircraft.

== April 28, 1975 (Monday) ==
- David Prosser, the lone security guard at Israel's consulate in Johannesburg, South Africa, killed three consulate employees, held another 21 people hostage, and wounded 37 people. Although police initially estimated that six terrorists had seized the consulate, Prosser later revealed that he had fired weapons from different windows on the fifth floor, and had spoken to them by radio using different accents. South African police rushed the building after Prosser began firing from the window at crowds outside the building. Prosser, a South African Jew who had fought for Israel in the 1973 Yom Kippur, said that he had seized the consulate because he was dissatisfied with the government of Israeli Prime Minister Yitzhak Rabin. Prosser was captured alive, and later sentenced to 25 years in prison.
- The Bombing of Tan Son Nhut Air Base caused the halt of the fixed-wing air evacuation from the base.
- Died: Hans Heilbronn, 66, German-born Canadian mathematician and co-discoverer of the Deuring–Heilbronn phenomenon

== April 29, 1975 (Tuesday) ==
- At 11:08 am ICT in Saigon (4:08 am GMT), the order to carry out Operation Frequent Wind was received, commencing the evacuation of all Americans from South Vietnam, as well as South Vietnamese nationals who might face retaliation. The first wave of helicopters was dispatched from the aircraft carrier USS Hancock landed by 3:00 pm on the grounds of the U.S. Defense Attaché Office compound next to Tan Son Nhut Airport. In all, American helicopters evacuated 1,373 Americans, 5,595 South Vietnamese and 815 foreign nationals in a span of 18 hours.
- Two U.S. Marine Security Guards - Corporal Charles McMahon and Lance Corporal Darwin L. Judge - became the last American servicemen to be killed in Vietnam, the victims of North Vietnamese shelling of the airport. Their remains were inadvertently left behind, and would be buried by North Vietnamese at a Saigon cemetery. On February 22, 1976, the bodies of the two servicemen would be released back to American custody.

== April 30, 1975 (Wednesday) ==
- The Fall of Saigon took place, effectively ending the Vietnam War as a victory for the Communists, at 10:24 am local time (0324 UTC) when South Vietnamese President Duong Van Minh announced the surrender of the nation to North Vietnamese invaders. "I believe firmly in reconciliation among Vietnamese to avoid unnecessary shedding of the blood of Vietnamese", said Minh. "For this reason, I ask the soldiers of the Republic of Vietnam to cease hostilities in calm and to stay where they are." Shortly after Minh called for ceasefire, North Vietnamese tanks knocked down the Independence Palace gate. The Viet Cong flag was raised over the presidential palace at 12:15 p.m. Minh was taken to a radio station to announce the government's unconditional surrender. Throughout the day in Saigon, ARVN soldiers discarded their military uniforms. PAVN soldiers and VC soldiers occupied all of Saigon, without resistance, by 11:00 in the morning. Earlier in the day, U.S. Ambassador Graham Martin was the last American diplomat to leave Saigon, lifting off of the U.S. Embassy roof at 4:58 am, and at 7:53 am USMC Colonel James Kean and ten U.S. Marines left on an American helicopter, ending the U.S. presence in Vietnam. Saigon was renamed "Ho Chi Minh City". Huỳnh Tấn Phát of North Vietnam would administer the "Provisional Revolutionary Government of the Republic of South Vietnam" as president until July 2, 1976, when the area would be formally incorporated by the North as part of the Democratic Republic of Vietnam.
- According to a Giai Phong Press Agency radio broadcast, several Mekong provinces, including Cần Thơ, the capital of IV Corps, had not surrendered in accordance with Minh's unconditional surrender. It was reported that VC soldiers started the final drive to take over the weakened Mekong provincial capitals. The next day, all of the ARVN regiments and divisions in the Mekong Delta either dissolved or surrendered to outnumbered VC soldiers.
- Born:
  - Elliott Sadler, American NASCAR driver also known infamously for his near injury crash in 2003 EA Sports 500.
  - Johnny Galecki, American television actor (The Big Bang Theory); in Bree, Belgium
  - Michael Chaturantabut, Thailand-born American actor, in Rayong
- Died:
  - Gen Paul, 79, French painter and engraver
  - Four ARVN generals committed suicide following the surrender of South Vietnam:
    - Le Van Hung, 42, ARVN IV Corps Deputy Commander 1974–75 in Cần Thơ
    - Tran Van Hai, 50, ARVN Brigadier General at Dong Tam Base Camp
    - Le Nguyen Vy, 42, 5th Infantry Division commander
    - Pham Van Phu, 46, II Corps commander
