= May 1950 =

Month of 1950

<<	May 1950					>>
Su	Mo	Tu	We	Th	Fr	Sa
	1	2	3	4	5	6
7	8	9	10	11	12	13
14	15	16	17	18	19	20
21	22	23	24	25	26	27
28	29	30	31

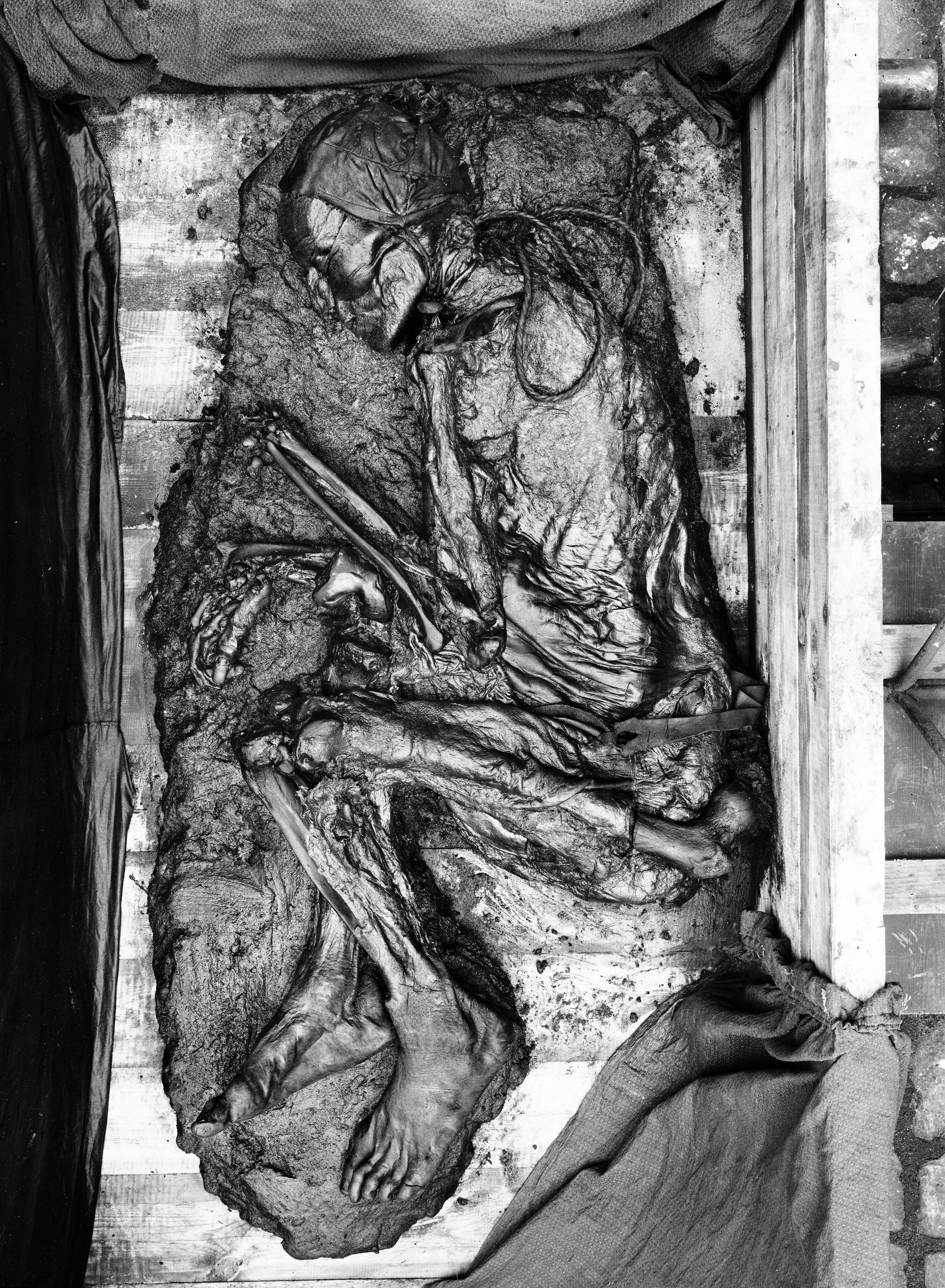
May 6, 1950: Tolund man discovered 22 centuries after his death (Nationalmuseet photo)

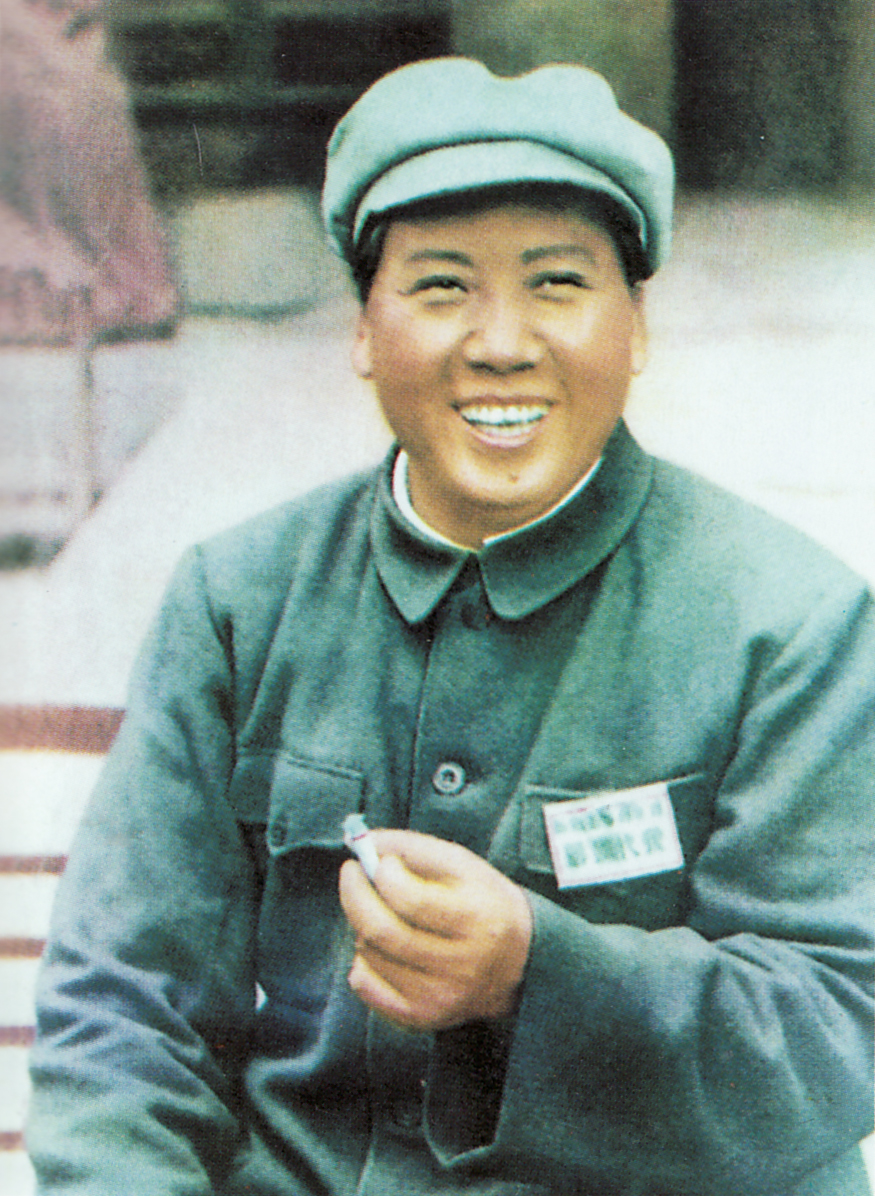
May 15, 1950: China's Mao Zedong....

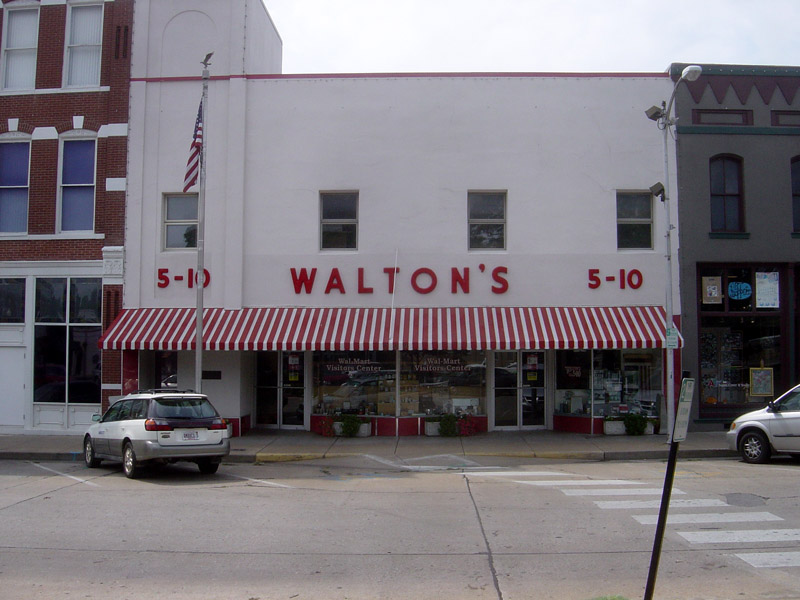
May 9, 1950: Future Wal-Mart mogul opens his first store

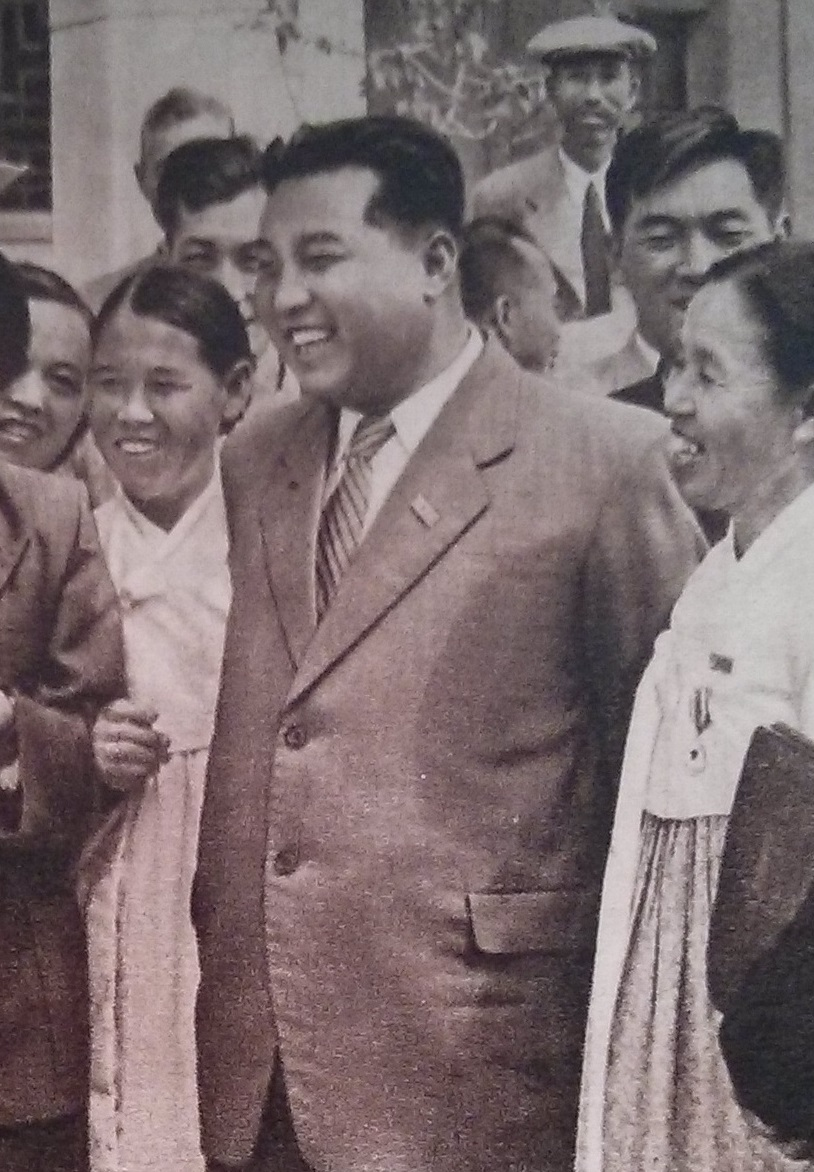
... gives North Korea's Kim Il-sung go-ahead for invasion

The following events occurred in May 1950:

== May 1, 1950 (Monday) ==
- At a May Day rally in South Africa to protest apartheid, police fired into a crowd of black demonstrators at Johannesburg, killing 19 people and injuring 38.
- The town of Mosinee, Wisconsin, was the site of a mock Communist takeover, staged by the local American Legion outpost to illustrate what life under Soviet conquest might be like. Benjamin Gitlow, who had twice been the vice-presidential candidate for the Communist Party USA (in 1924 and 1928), before renouncing Communism, played the role of General Secretary of the Communist Party of the "United Soviet States of America", while another former Communist, Joseph Zack Kornfeder, assisted as the new Commissar of the town, renamed "Moskva" in the exercise. A Soviet flag flew in front of the American Legion outpost. Mayor Ralph E. Kronenwetter, who had participated in the mock coup by allowing himself to be "arrested", suffered a cerebral hemorrhage that evening, and died six days later at the age of 49, while another participant, Reverend William L. Bennett, died the day after Kronenwetter.
- Operations began for the United Nations Relief and Works Agency for Palestine Refugees in the Near East (UNRWA).
- Springbok Radio was launched as the first commercial radio station in South Africa, broadcasting programming in both English and Afrikaans.
- The Charlemagne Prize was first awarded for work done in the service of European unification. The first recipient was Richard von Coudenhove-Kalergi, the founder of the Pan-European Movement.
- Died: Lothrop Stoddard, 66, American eugenicist

== May 2, 1950 (Tuesday) ==
- The Central University for Nationalities was established in Beijing to offer programs for China's minorities.

== May 3, 1950 (Wednesday) ==
- Alpha Beta Alpha, the first fraternity for undergraduate students of library science (open to men and women alike) was established.
- Died: Theodor Duesterberg, 74, German politician who ran for president in 1932

== May 4, 1950 (Thursday) ==
- The Soviet Union announced that it had completed repatriation of all German prisoners of war who had been captured during World War II, and that the last group of 17,538 Germans concluded the return of 1,939,063 German POWs. West German chancellor Konrad Adenauer, pointing out that the TASS news agency had reported in 1945 that there were 3.5 million German POWs held in the USSR, demanded to know what had happened to more than 1.5 million still missing. and the U.S. State Department described the Soviet claim as "fantastic and absurd", and that an estimated 200,000 German POWs were still prisoners in Soviet labor camps.
- In Centerville, Texas, seven schoolchildren, all African-American, were killed when their school bus collided with a truck.
- The science fiction short story fixup The Martian Chronicles by Ray Bradbury was published.

== May 5, 1950 (Friday) ==
- The coronation of Thailand's King Bhumibol Adulyadej took place in Bangkok, continuing the reign of the Chakri Dynasty that had started in 1782. Bhumibol had been King since the death of his brother, Ananda Mahidol, on June 9, 1946
- The Uniform Code of Military Justice was signed into law by U.S. President Truman, to become effective on May 31, 1951.
- Born: Googoosh, Iranian singer and actress, as Faegheh Atashin in Tehran

== May 6, 1950 (Saturday) ==
- The well-preserved body of the Tollund Man, who had died in the 4th Century BC was discovered by Viggo Højgaard, his wife Grethe, and his brother Emil, in a bog near the city of Silkeborg in Denmark. Radiocarbon dating concluded that the average calculated date of the man's death was 2,260 to 2,220 years before present (310 BC to 270 BC) with a calibrated range of 375 BC to 210 BC).
- Elizabeth Taylor, 18-year-old movie starlet, went through the first of eight weddings, with a ceremony at the Church of the Good Shepherd in Beverly Hills, California. The groom was 23-year-old Conrad Hilton Jr., heir to the $125,000,000 hotel empire.
- Collier's magazine published Ray Bradbury's classic science fiction story, "There Will Come Soft Rains", describing the aftermath of a nuclear holocaust with the setting of a computer-controlled house that continued to operate after the death of its occupants. In the story, the setting was the fictional city of Allendale, California, on the then-future date of April 28, 1985. When the story was reprinted as a chapter in Bradbury's book The Martian Chronicles, the future date would be revised to August 4, 2026.
- Serbian Muslim peasants in the Yugoslavian town of Cazin, led by Milan Bozic and Mile Devrnja, revolted against the Communist government in frustration over the collective farm system, required delivery of harvests to the government, and excessive taxes. The rebellion was suppressed with the arrest of 714 people, of whom 17 were sentenced to death, including Bozic and Devrnja.
- Middleground won the Kentucky Derby.
- Warrington defeated Widnes 19–0 in rugby's Challenge Cup Final in front of 94,249 at Wembley Stadium.
- Died: Agnes Smedley, 58, American journalist

== May 7, 1950 (Sunday) ==
- Saint Anthony Claret (1807–1870), founder of the Missionary Sons of the Immaculate Heart of Mary (known as the Claretians) was canonized by Pope Pius XII.
- Born:
  - Tim Russert, American journalist and moderator of Meet the Press, in Buffalo, New York (d. 2008)
  - Alexander Zemlianichenko, Russian journalist and Pulitzer Prize winner, in Saratov

== May 8, 1950 (Monday) ==
- U.S. Secretary of State Dean Acheson announced an agreement with France and the State of Vietnam to provide ten million dollars of military assistance, the first of what would become three billion dollars of American money spent to fight Communism in Indochina over the next 25 years.

== May 9, 1950 (Tuesday) ==
- France's Foreign Minister Robert Schuman presented his proposal for France and West Germany to work together on the production of coal and steel, "under a common High Authority in an organization open to the other countries of Europe". Italy, Belgium, the Netherlands and Luxembourg would join France and West Germany in creating the European Coal and Steel Community (ECSC) on April 18, 1951. The "Schuman Declaration", is considered to be the beginning of the creation of what is now the European Union and May 9 is celebrated annually as "Europe Day".

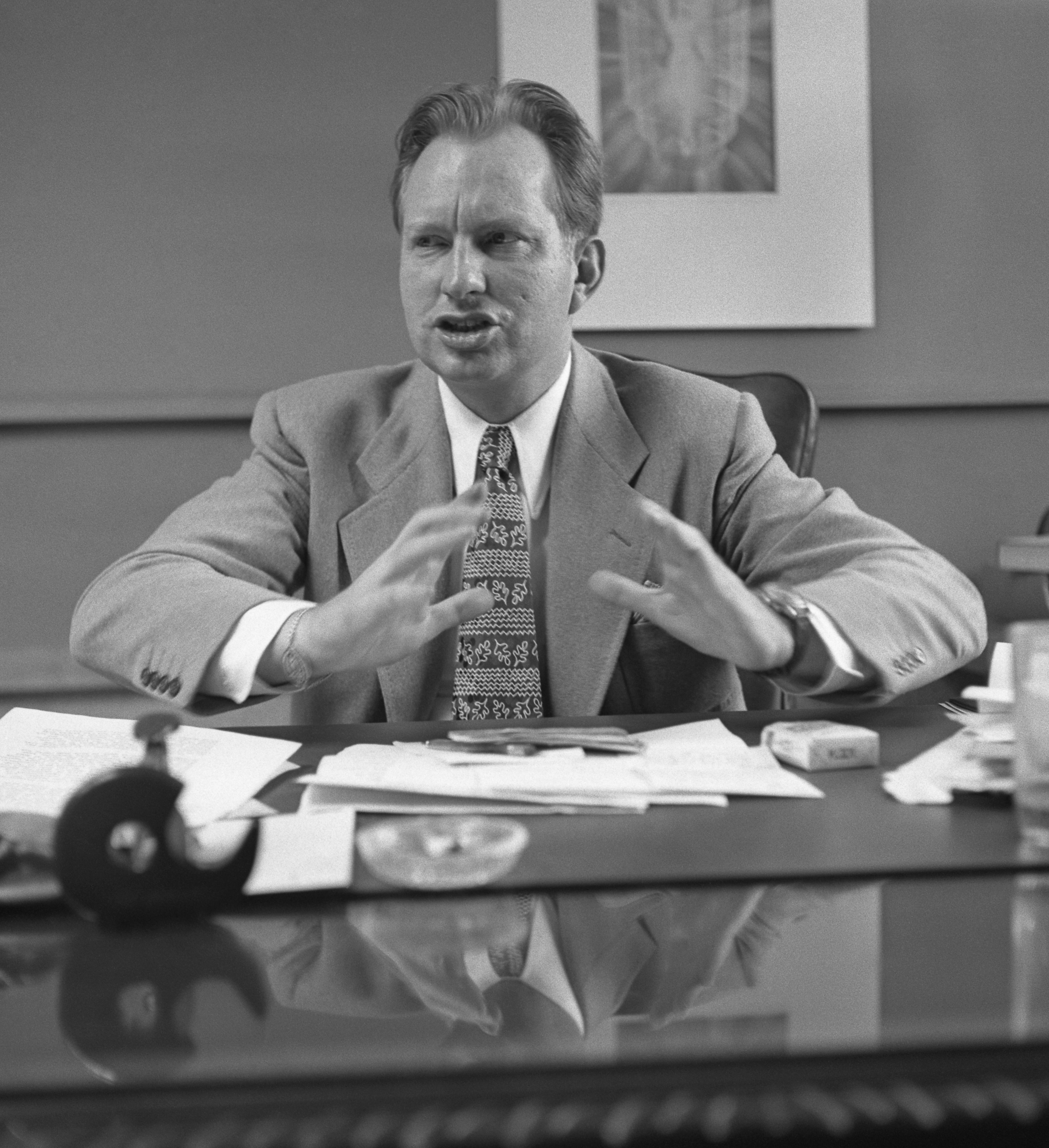
Hubbard

- L. Ron Hubbard first published Dianetics: The Modern Science of Mental Health.
- In Bentonville, Arkansas, businessman Sam Walton signed a 99-year lease on a run-down department store, after having been forced to close his successful Ben Franklin franchise in Newport when the building owner would not renew a lease there. Walton would build his business into a chain of stores that became Wal-Mart.
- Died: Esteban Terradas i Illa, 66, Spanish mathematician

== May 10, 1950 (Wednesday) ==

- The National Science Foundation was founded as a U.S. government agency with a stated mission "to promote the progress of science; to advance the national health, prosperity, and welfare; and to secure the national defense."

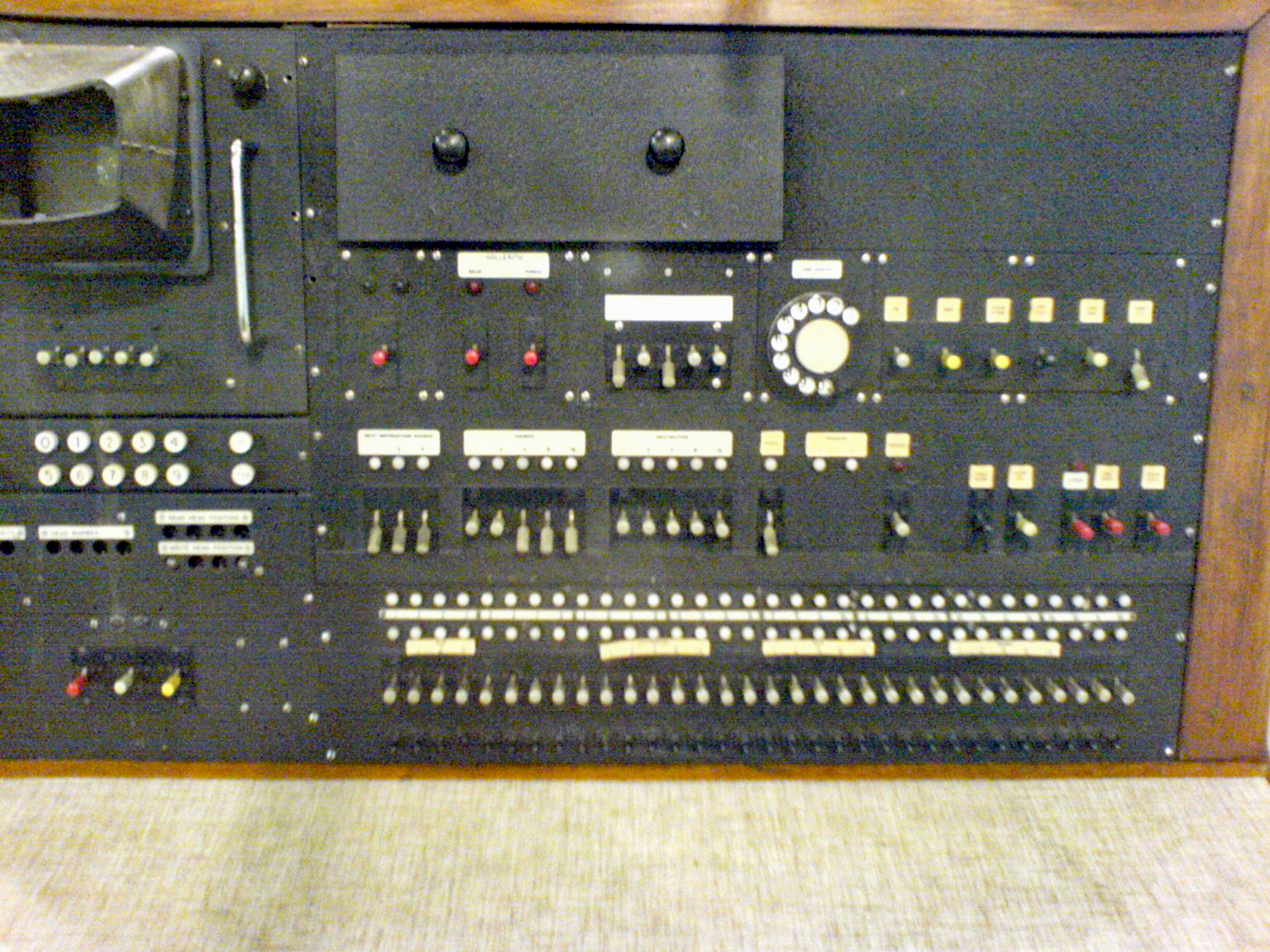
Turing's Pilot

- The Pilot ACE, a digital computer designed by Alan Turing, successfully ran its first program, a routine called "successive digits" or "suck digs" that would turn on console lights one by one.
- Dumarsais Estimé was overthrown as President of Haiti in a military coup organized by Paul Magloire. Franck Lavaud served for seven months as Chairman of the Military Executive Committee until December 6, when Magloire became president.
- Ir. J. Poetoehena was sworn in as the last Prime Minister of the State of East Indonesia, serving until August, when the state was incorporated into the Republic of Indonesia with Suharto being the first President.
- Died: John Gould Fletcher, 64, American poet, 1939 Pulitzer Prize winner

== May 11, 1950 (Thursday) ==
- The McMinnville UFO photographs, among the most famous photos purported of an unidentified flying object were taken by Paul Trent, a farmer near McMinnville, Oregon, after his wife spotted a flying disc. Trent developed the pictures, showed them to a local banker who placed them on display, and a reporter for the McMinnville Telephone Register ran the story after inquiring, and the photos would appear later in LIFE Magazine. "Skeptics found nothing to disparage the Trents' integrity," it would be written 48 years later, "and no financial motive for having faked UFO pictures."
- Dongshan Island was captured by 10,000 Communist Chinese troops from the Nationalist Chinese.
- A coal mine gas explosion in a deep mine, near Mons in Belgium, killed at least 41 miners, all of whom had been working 1,650 feet underground.

== May 12, 1950 (Friday) ==
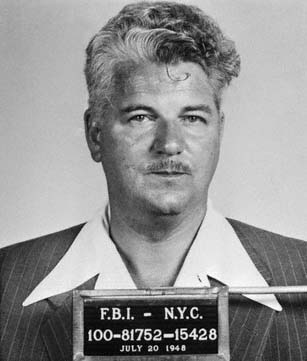
CPUSA Gen. Sec'y Dennis

- Eugene Dennis (real name Francis Xavier Waldron), the General Secretary of the Communist Party USA, began a one-year jail sentence for contempt of Congress.
- The Presidium of the Supreme Soviet of the USSR restored the death penalty for crimes committed during peacetime, after having abolished it nearly three years earlier on May 26, 1947.
- Born:
  - Ching Hai, Vietnamese-born spiritual leader, in Quảng Ngãi Province
  - Billy Squier, American rock musician, in Wellesley, Massachusetts

== May 13, 1950 (Saturday) ==
- North Korea's Communist leader Kim Il Sung arrived in Beijing and informed China's Chairman Mao Zedong that Joseph Stalin of the Soviet Union had given Kim the go-ahead to reunify the Korean peninsula by force, and received Mao's approval as well. Not believing Kim, Mao made an urgent visit to the Soviet Embassy that night and asked Ambassador N. V. Roshchin to get confirmation from Stalin, which was relayed the next day with the words, "If Chinese comrades do not agree, then we have to resolve this question."

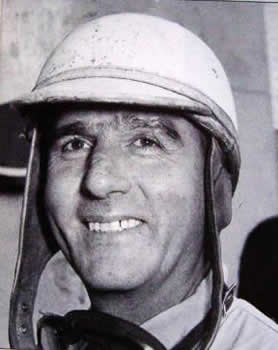
Nino Farina

- The first race in the inaugural FIA Formula One World Championship, providing for "a schedule of races around the world", was held at Silverstone in England, and won by Nino Farina of Italy.
- The Communist Party of Venezuela was outlawed by decree of Venezuela's President Carlos Delgado Chalbuld, after the South American nation's oil production had been disrupted by a labor strike. On May 7, General Delgado of the ruling military junta had dissolved 45 labor unions which represented oil industry workers.
- Born:
  - Stevie Wonder, blind American soul musician, as Steveland Hardaway Judkins, in Saginaw, Michigan. A premature infant, Stevie developed retrolental fibroplasia while being exposed to pure oxygen in an incubator.
  - Danny Kirwan, British guitarist with Fleetwood Mac, in London (d. 2018)
  - Gabriel Byrne, Irish actor, in Dublin
  - Bobby Valentine, American baseball manager, in Stamford, Connecticut

== May 14, 1950 (Sunday) ==
- The "first genuinely free elections" in the history of Turkey took place, with the Democrat Party of Adnan Menderes capturing 396 of the 487 seats in the General Assembly, and bringing an end to the rule of Ismet Inonu and the Republican People's Party, who had only 68 seats.
- Joseph Stalin replied to Mao Zedong, confirming that he had given Kim Il Sung the okay to "unify" Korea, but added, "If Chinese comrades do not agree, then we have to resolve this question."
- Died: Johnstown, 14, American racehorse, winner of 1939 Kentucky Derby and Belmont Stakes

== May 15, 1950 (Monday) ==
- In what one historian describes as "arguably the most important date in PRC diplomatic history" as well as "a terrible blunder", Mao Zedong approved Kim Il Sung's plan for North Korea to invade South Korea, starting the Korean War.
- General Józef Kuropieska, of the People's Army of Poland, was arrested on fabricated charges of spying for the West, starting a purge of officers by the Defense Minister, Marshal Konstantin Rokossovsky. The "Trial of the Generals" would take place in 1951, with 40 indicted officers being sentenced to death.
- Born: Renate Stecher, East German track athlete, gold medalist in 1972 and 1976, in Dreiheide

== May 16, 1950 (Tuesday) ==
- The Soviet Union announced that it was cutting the remaining reparations, owed to it from East Germany, by half. Of ten billion dollars demanded, the East Germans' payments since 1945 were to amount to $3,658,000,000 by year's end. The remaining $6,342,000,000 was reduced to $3,171,000,000 to be paid by the end of 1965. The announcement came after worldwide protests of the Soviet declaration that it had no more German prisoners of war to return.
- Born: Bruce Coville, American children's author, in Syracuse, New York

== May 17, 1950 (Wednesday) ==
- The American, British and French occupational governments published a law giving West Germany the right to decide on control of the steel and coal industries of the Ruhr valley.
- The musical comedy film Annie Get Your Gun starring Betty Hutton and based on the 1946 stage musical of the same name premiered at Loew's State Theatre in New York City.
- Born:
  - Janez Drnovšek, President of Yugoslavia 1989–1990, Prime Minister of Slovenia (1992–2002) and President of Slovenia (2002–2007); in Kisovec, Yugoslavia (d. 2008).
  - Dian Curtis Regan, American children's author known for the Ghost Twins series of mysteries published by Scholastic Books; in Colorado Springs, Colorado

== May 18, 1950 (Thursday) ==
- The Oberammergau Passion Play was performed for the first time since 1934, in the Bavarian West German village Oberammergau. The U.S. and British High Commissioners, as well as American and British military officers, appeared for the first performance after receiving assurances that none of the performers were former Nazis.
- Saint Vincenza Gerosa (1784–1847) and Saint Bartolomea Capitanio (1807–1836), co-founders of the Sisters of Charity of Levore, were both canonized by Pope Pius XII as saints of the Roman Catholic Church.
- The comedy film Father of the Bride starring Spencer Tracy and Elizabeth Taylor premiered at Radio City Music Hall in New York.
- Born: Mark Mothersbaugh, American musician (Devo), in Akron, Ohio

== May 19, 1950 (Friday) ==
- Thirty-one people were killed and over 350 injured in the South Amboy powder pier explosion.
- An attempt, in the U.S. Senate, to break a Southern Democratic filibuster against the Fair Employment Practices Act failed to gather the necessary 64 votes (two-thirds of the entire membership of 98 Senators), though the margin was 52–32 in favor of cloture.
- Born: Patrick Caddell, American political consultant and pollster, in Rock Hill, South Carolina (d. 2019)
- Died: Wattie Holm, 48, former St. Louis Cardinals baseball player, in a murder-suicide

== May 20, 1950 (Saturday) ==
- Armed Forces Day was observed for the first time in the United States, following the proclamation by President Truman. The day has been observed annually, since then, on the third Saturday of May. Retired Lt.Col. Oliver North would comment later that "the day has pretty much been ignored" because it's "just at the wrong time of year... sandwiched between Easter and Memorial Day".

== May 21, 1950 (Sunday) ==
- The first group of Iraqi Jews arrived in Tel Aviv, marking the beginning of Operation Ezra and Nehemiah. Over the following year, until the halt of the exodus from Iraq on July 18, 1951, more than 100,000 of the refugees would resettle in Israel.
- Cuzco, in Peru was rocked by an earthquake that killed 129 people, injured 300, and destroyed ninety percent of the structures in the one-time capital of the Inca Empire.

== May 22, 1950 (Monday) ==
- Celal Bayar became the third President of Turkey, and Adnan Menderes became the new Prime Minister.
- The first performance of Four Last Songs, by German composer Richard Strauss (who had died the year before), was given by the composer's choice of soloist, Norwegian-born soprano Kirsten Flagstad, with the Philharmonia Orchestra conducted by Wilhelm Furtwängler at the Royal Albert Hall in London, The event was sponsored by the wealthy governor of India's Mysore State, Jayachamarajendra Wadiyar, who was also president of the orchestra.

== May 23, 1950 (Tuesday) ==
- Harry Gold, an American atomic research scientist believed to have assisted Klaus Fuchs in passing nuclear secrets to the Soviets, was arrested by the FBI in Philadelphia and charged with espionage, with the possibility of receiving the death penalty. Gold's confession implicated David Greenglass, who turned in his own sister, Ethel Rosenberg, and her husband, Julius Rosenberg.
- The Baptist Bible Fellowship was organized.
- Born:
  - William P. Barr, U.S. Attorney General, in New York City
  - Richard Chase, American serial killer nicknamed "The Vampire of Sacramento" (d. 1980)

== May 24, 1950 (Wednesday) ==
- The U.S. Maritime Administration was created as an agency of the U.S. Department of Commerce.
- Ingrid Bergman and Roberto Rossellini were married by proxy in Juarez, Mexico, where four attorneys appeared on their behalf, while the couple remained in Rome.
- A Lansa Airways airplane crashed into the side of the 8,000 foot Galeras volcano in Colombia, five miles west of the village of Pasto. Only one of the 29 people on board survived, a little girl who was seriously injured.
- France restored the official recognition of Mother's Day, with provision that the Fête des Mères would take place annually on the last Sunday in May. Article II of the legislation provided that if Pentecost fell on that Sunday (which last happened in 2009), Mother's Day would be observed on the first Sunday of June.
- Born: Thomas DeSimone, American mobster and the inspiration for the character "Tommy DeVito" in the film Goodfellas (disappeared 1979)
- Died: Archibald Wavell, 1st Earl Wavell, 67, Viceroy of India 1943–1947

== May 25, 1950 (Thursday) ==
- Thirty-three people were killed in Chicago when a streetcar collided with a gasoline truck on State Street, between 62nd and 63rd Streets. As with other Chicago disasters (the October 30, 1972 Illinois Central collision and the May 25, 1979 DC-10 crash), there is no historical marker acknowledging the event.
- The Tripartite Declaration was issued by the United States, the United Kingdom and France, with the parties agreeing not to sell arms to Middle Eastern nations without the unanimous agreement of all three nations.
- The Brooklyn-Battery Tunnel was formally opened to traffic.
- The World Fellowship of Buddhists was founded in Colombo, Sri Lanka

== May 26, 1950 (Friday) ==
- The Kefauver Committee hearings into U.S. organized crime began.
- Malaya, now Malaysia adopted the precursor to its current national flag (the Jalur Gemilang).

== May 27, 1950 (Saturday) ==
- The Journal of the American Medical Association published its first articles showing a link between cigarette smoking and an increased risk of lung cancer. "Tobacco Smoking as a Possible Etiological Factor in Bronchogenic Carcinoma: A Study of Six Hundred and Eighty-Four Proved Cases" was by Ernest L. Wynder and Dr. Evarts A. Graham, while "Cancer and Tobacco Smoking: A Preliminary Report" was authored by Drs. Morton L. Levin, Hyman Goldstein and Paul R. Gerhardt.
- Gasoline rationing came to an end in the United Kingdom after nearly eleven years, one day after British Fuel Minister Philip Noel-Baker declared that the Standard Oil Company of New Jersey (now Exxon) would supply more fuel if rationing ceased. The limitations on sales had begun after September 3, 1939, the day of Britain's entry into World War II.
- King Frederik IX of Denmark signed legislation that adopted the recommendations of the Grønlandskommissionen (Greenland Commission) for changing the status of Denmark's colony in Greenland, including an end to the control of half of the island exercised by KGH (Kongelige Grønlandske Handel), the Royal Greenland Trading Department. In 1953, Greenland would be elevated from the status of colony to an autonomous province.
- The Society of Women Engineers was founded by 50 female engineers at the Cooper Union in New York.
- Born: Dee Dee Bridgewater, American jazz singer as Denise Eileen Garrett in Memphis, Tennessee

== May 28, 1950 (Sunday) ==
- The TV show Zoo Parade, the first television program about wildlife exploration, debuted on NBC and was hosted by Marlin Perkins, the director of Chicago's Lincoln Park Zoo.
- Saint Joan of Valois (1464–1505) was canonized as a saint in the Roman Catholic Church.
- Yugoslavia closed its embassy in Albania as relations between the two nations deteriorated, and would cease all diplomatic relations on October 11.
- Died: Marc Sangnier, 77, French Roman Catholic philosopher

== May 29, 1950 (Monday) ==
- St. Roch, the first ship to make a circumnavigation of North America, arrived in Halifax, Nova Scotia, from where it had started on July 15, 1944. The ship traversed the Northwest Passage and the Panama Canal in a voyage of more than 15,000 miles. Although the actual sailing time was only 137 days, the ship, owned by the Royal Canadian Mounted Police, had layovers throughout the Arctic portion of the trip to bring supplies to remote RCMP outposts.
- North Korea fired artillery across the 38th Parallel into South Korea, heavily damaging the city of Kaesong. As part of the agreement ending hostilities in 1953, Kaesong would become part of North Korean territory.
- Born: Frederick Sumaye, ninth Prime Minister of Tanzania (1995–2005)
- Died: Earl Winfield Spencer Jr., 61, American Navy pilot and the first husband (1916–1927) of Wallis Simpson, the Duchess of Windsor

== May 30, 1950 (Tuesday) ==
- Participation was high in voting for the National Assembly of South Korea, with 2,209 candidates for the 210 seats. The ruling Democratic Nationalist Party and the Korea Nationalist Party each won 24 seats, while independent candidates got 126 seats.
- Johnny Parsons won a shortened version of the Indianapolis 500 auto race, which was called off by rain after he had driven 345 miles.
- Born:
  - Bertrand Delanoë, Mayor of Paris from 2001 to 2014; in Tunis, Tunisia colony
  - M. G. Vassanji, Canadian novelist, in Nairobi, Kenya, British East Africa

== May 31, 1950 (Wednesday) ==
- Israel's army transported 120 illegal immigrants to the border with Jordan at the Wadi Araba desert and ordered them to make their way back to their Jordanian homes. Sir Alec Kirkbride, the British ambassador to Jordan, would write later that 36 of the group did not survive the trip and died of thirst in the desert.
- Born: Gregory Harrison, American actor, in Avalon, California
