= June 1950 =

Month of 1950

<<	June 1950					>>
Su	Mo	Tu	We	Th	Fr	Sa
				1	2	3
4	5	6	7	8	9	10
11	12	13	14	15	16	17
18	19	20	21	22	23	24
25	26	27	28	29	30

June 25–28, 1950: North Korea invades South Korea, captures Seoul in 80 hours

The following events occurred in June 1950:

== June 1, 1950 (Thursday) ==
Guam

- Guam was given the status of a United States Territory, and all of its residents were granted U.S. citizenship.
- The French government sent a 24-hour ultimatum to the British government, to either accept the proposal for joining what would become the European Coal and Steel Community, or miss out on the negotiations set to start the next day.
- The Welsh Air Service, the world's first scheduled helicopter service, began operating between Cardiff, Wrexham and Liverpool.
- At 9:30 pm near Hilo, Mauna Loa in Hawaii started erupting.
- Born: Gennadi Manakov, Soviet cosmonaut, in Yefimovka, Orenburg Oblast (d. 2019)

== June 2, 1950 (Friday) ==
- At a meeting presided over by Deputy Prime Minister Herbert Morrison in the absence of Prime Minister Clement Attlee, the British cabinet ministers elected not to participate in the talks to create the European Coal and Steel Community.
- The United States and Canada became associate members of the Organisation for Economic Co-operation and Development (OEEC).

== June 3, 1950 (Saturday) ==
The ECSC flag

Annapurna

- The European Coal and Steel Community was formed in Paris by France, West Germany, Italy, Belgium, the Netherlands and Luxembourg.
- The first "World Series" in the 15-year history of the Roller Derby began at New York's Madison Square Garden, with five teams competing against each other, "headed by the pennant-winning Philadelphia Panthers". The series was a six-night round-robin tournament that also featured the Jersey Jolters, the Brooklyn Red Devils, the Chicago Westerners and the New York Chiefs.
- The racehorse Citation set a new record for running the mile, with a mark of 1 minute, 33.6 seconds to win the Golden Gate Mile in Albany, California. Citation also set a new record for earnings as the $20,000 prize set his total earnings to $924,630.
- Annapurna, at 26,545 feet (8,091 m) feet the tenth highest mountain in the world, was first ascended by the French Annapurna expedition to become the highest peak climbed (and the first 8,000-metre peak climbed) up to that time. The flag of France was planted on the summit by Maurice Herzog and Louis Lachenal. Both Herzog and Lachenal, who made the climb without bottled oxygen and refused to turn back in spite of the onset of frostbite, lost all of their toes, and Herzog lost all of his fingers as well.
- Born:
  - Deniece Williams, American pop singer, songwriter and four time Grammy Award winner, as June Deniece Chandler in Gary, Indiana
  - Suzi Quatro, American rock musician, singer, bass player and four time Grammy Award winner, as Susan Quatrocchio in Detroit

== June 4, 1950 (Sunday) ==
- Nationwide elections for the House of Councillors in Japan, with the majority Liberal Democratic Party, headed by Prime Minister Shigeru Yoshida, increased its share, winning 52 of the 132 seats.
- Voters in Belgium voted for Parliament, determining the fate of King Leopold III if he should return from exile to rule the nation. The Social Christian Party, which favored the King, won 107 seats, while the "anti-Leopold" coalition of Socialists, Liberals and Communists combined for 105 seats.
- Nazim al-Kudsi formed a government as the new Prime Minister of Syria.
- Died:
  - Ahmad Tajuddin, 36, Sultan of Brunei since 1924. The Sultan was succeeded by his younger brother, Omar Ali Saifuddien III.
  - Kazys Grinius, 83, President of Lithuania in 1926
  - George Cecil Ives, 82, British gay rights activist and poet

== June 5, 1950 (Monday) ==
- The U.S. Supreme Court ruled in the case of Sweatt v. Painter and a companion case, McLaurin v. Oklahoma State Regents, that the doctrine of "separate but equal" was invalid unless a state was able to provide equal opportunities to each race.
- The Allied High Commission returned control to West Germany of that nation's chemical industry, on the condition that the chemicals manufactured would be limited to those used in peacetime.
- A chartered C-46 airplane operated by Westair had to ditch in the Atlantic Ocean after losing power during a flight from San Juan, Puerto Rico, to Wilmington, Delaware, with the loss of 37 of the 65 people on board.
- Born: Abraham Sarmiento, Jr., Philippine editor who defied the Marcos government; in Manila (d. 1977)

== June 6, 1950 (Tuesday) ==
- The "Red Purge", a political action by the Tokyo government against officials of the Japanese Communist Party, reached its peak. Over the next seven months, the purge was extended to party members and sympathizers, and 20,997 public and private employees were fired from their jobs, leftist newspapers were put out of business, and leftist student organizations were raided.
- Died: Charles S. Howard, 73, millionaire car dealer and owner of the famous racehorse Seabiscuit

== June 7, 1950 (Wednesday) ==
- The Communist governments of Poland and East Germany agreed to set the border between their two nations as the Oder River and the Neisse River, with the Germans relinquishing claims to the territory lost in World War II.
- Born: Howard Finkel, American pro wrestling ring announcer, in Newark, New Jersey (d. 2020)

== June 8, 1950 (Thursday) ==
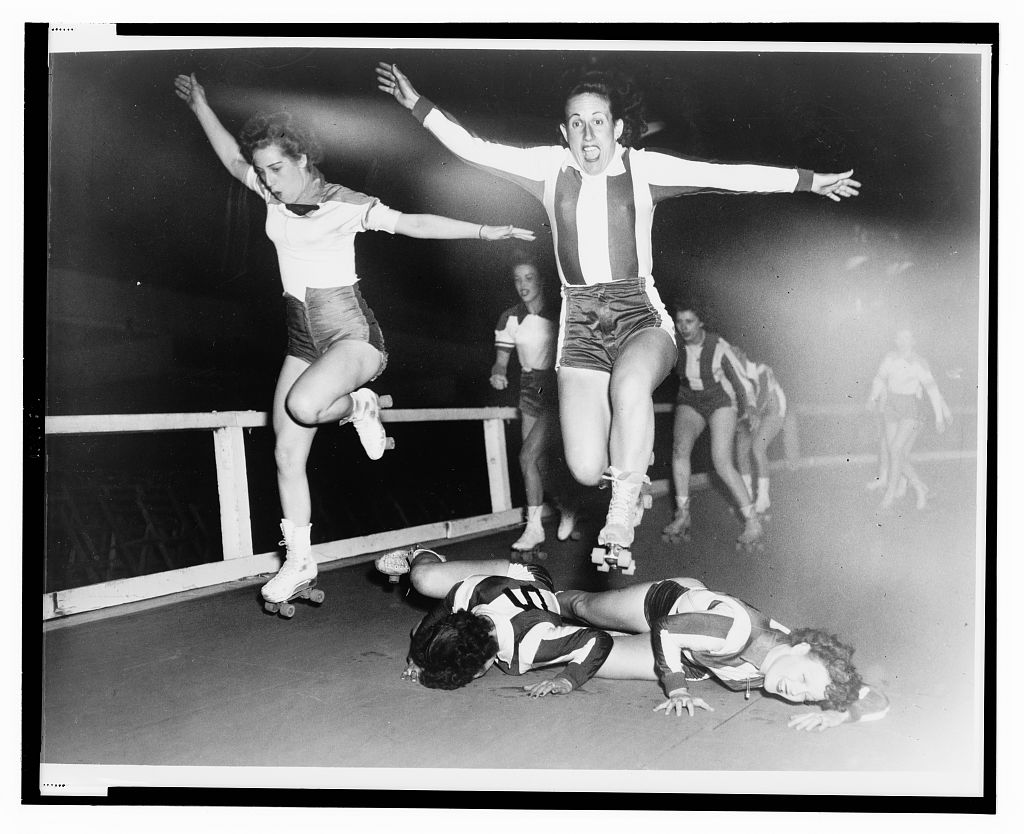
A 1950 roller derby match

- The New Jersey Jolters defeated the Brooklyn Red Devils, 24 to 22, to win the first ever "World Series of Roller Derby", before a crown of 16,877 people at New York City's Madison Square Garden.
- Newspapers in Pyongyang, the capital of Communist North Korea, published the manifesto of the "Central Committee of the United Democratic Patriotic Front", adopted the day before, announcing the goal of reunification of North Korea and South Korea starting with meetings on August 15. Seventeen days later, North Korean troops would invade South Korea.

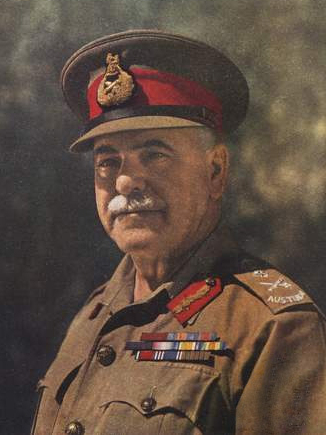
Field Marshal Blamey

- Sir Thomas Blamey became the first, and only Field Marshal in Australian history, less than a year before his death on May 27, 1951.
- Born:
  - Kathy Baker, American TV and film actress, in Midland, Texas
  - Sônia Braga, Brazilian TV and film actress, in Maringá

== June 9, 1950 (Friday) ==
- In Budapest, 322 priests and monks, and more than 600 nuns, were arrested and transported to various camps within Hungary. Vatican Radio reported the news more than two weeks later, on June 26.
- Screenwriters Dalton Trumbo and John Howard Lawson were hauled to jail, handcuffed together, after being convicted of contempt of Congress.
- A landslide buried 70 construction employees at the Japanese village of Kumanodiara while they were working on repair of a railway track, with only 24 people rescued.

== June 10, 1950 (Saturday) ==
- An official of the United Nations Commission on Korea crossed into North Korea and received the text of that nation's proposal for unification with South Korea, bringing back three "peace representatives" from the North.

== June 11, 1950 (Sunday) ==
- NASCAR racer John Edward "Skimp" Hersey, 37, was fatally injured when he lost control of his car during a race at Atlanta's Lakewood Speedway. At the time, it was common for racers to keep a can of extra gasoline in their vehicles in case they ran out far from the pit, and Hersey's car was engulfed in flames. A photographer from the Atlanta Constitution newspaper was the first to reach the scene, and as he took pictures of the burning car, Hersey crawled out of the wreckage on fire. The newsman kept taking photos without making any effort to assist Hersey, and by the time another person was able to douse the flames, the burns were fatal. The remainder of the race was cancelled, and Jack Smith, who had been leading at the time of the accident, was declared the winner. The next day, Hersey died, while the photos of his crash ran on the front page of the Constitution.
- Houston businessman Stanford B. Twente chose the telecast of a minor league baseball game as his opportunity to commit suicide in front of a TV audience. Twente walked into the broadcast booth, where Dick Gottlieb was narrating the action, sat down, and then shot himself in the head. Viewers heard the shot, and then saw Gottlieb sitting next to Mr. Twente's corpse.
- Died: Sane Guruji, 50, Indian children's author, novelist and social reformer

== June 12, 1950 (Monday) ==
- The Bank of Korea began operations as the central bank for South Korea, one week after the enabling legislation had been passed, and two weeks before North Korean troops invaded Seoul to start the Korean War.
- The Philippine province of Mindoro, located on the island of the same name, was divided into Occidental Mindoro (west) and Oriental Mindoro (east).

== June 13, 1950 (Tuesday) ==
- An Air France DC-4 airplane, with 52 people on board, ditched in the sea near Bahrain after developing engine trouble en route from Karachi to Cairo. Only four people survived. Blame was placed upon the pilot for failing to keep track of his rate of descent during the final approach, and crashing into the sea. Two days later, another Air France DC-4 on the same route crashed into the sea during its approach to Bahrain.
- Vladimir Houdek, formerly the representative from Czechoslovakia to the United Nations, was given asylum in the United States, nearly a month after resigning his post on May 16. Houdek was admitted despite refusing to renounce his support of Communism.
- Soviet Finance Minister Arseny Zverev told a joint meeting of the Supreme Soviet that the nation's defense budget for 1950–1951 would be cut by 18.5%.
- All programs of the CBS Television Network were halted when 400 technicians went on strike in New York and in Hollywood.
- The three North Korean "peace representatives", who had crossed into South Korea on Saturday, were arrested.

== June 14, 1950 (Wednesday) ==
- U.S. Army General Douglas MacArthur, Commander in Chief Far East, submitted his "Memorandum on Formosa" to the Joint Chiefs of Staff in order to persuade the Truman Administration not to abandon the Republic of China on the island of Taiwan. MacArthur wrote that "Formosa in the hands of the Communists can be compared to an unsinkable aircraft carrier and submarine tender ideally located to accomplish Soviet offensive strategy and at the same time checkmate counteroffensive operations by the United States Forces based on Okinawa and the Philippines."
- Born: Rowan Williams, 104th Archbishop of Canterbury (2002-2012), in Swansea, Wales

== June 15, 1950 (Thursday) ==
- For the second time in two days, an Air France airliner crashed in the Persian Gulf near Bahrain. The Skymaster, which had started in Saigon and stopped at Karachi, signalled that it would make an emergency landing, with only 13 people surviving out of 53 on board. The June 13 crash had occurred at 12:15 am while approaching Bahrain, while the new accident happened at 12:45 am, under the same circumstances. Aviation Safety Network
- Born: Lakshmi Mittal, Indian-born British billionaire; in Rajgarh, Rajasthan State

== June 16, 1950 (Friday) ==
Opening day at Maracanã

- The Estádio do Maracanã, with seating for almost 200,000 spectators, opened in Rio de Janeiro, Brazil, with a match between the Rio de Janeiro All-Stars and the São Paulo All-Stars (which Rio won, 3-1).
- Opus Dei received additional recognition within the Roman Catholic Church, with the ratification of its Constitutions with approval of the Vatican.
- Born: Mithun Chakraborty, Indian film actor, in Barisal, East Bengal

== June 17, 1950 (Saturday) ==
- The first human organ transplant in history was performed at the Little Company of Mary Hospital, in the Chicago suburb of Evergreen Park, Illinois. The surgery was performed by a team led by Dr. Richard M. Lawler. Ruth Tucker, of Jasper, Indiana, received a kidney from an unidentified woman who had died an hour earlier from cirrhosis of the liver. and would survive for five more years after the operation.
- Actress Judy Garland declined to show up for filming of the MGM musical Royal Wedding, and was fired from her $5,000 per week contract later that day. Garland would be replaced by actress Jane Powell.

== June 18, 1950 (Sunday) ==
- The Joint Defence and Economic Co-operation Treaty was signed among the members of the Arab League.
- The Cleveland Indians set a Major League Baseball record by scoring 14 runs in the first inning of a game against the Philadelphia Athletics, with all of the Indians but one coming up to bat twice before the third out. The Indians would go on to win 21-2. p131
- Died: Chen Yi, 67, Republic of China politician who was executed after his plan to surrender to the Communists was discovered

== June 19, 1950 (Monday) ==
- Chile's government-owned oil exploration company, Empresa Nacional del Petróleo (ENAP), was created as Chile's President Gabriel González Videla signed Law No. 9618, to develop petroleum resources that had been discovered in Tierra del Fuego and in the Strait of Magellan.
- A representative of U.S. secretary of state Dean Acheson told the South Korean legislature that the U.S. would come to South Korea's defense in the event of an attack.
- Virginia Cassidy Blythe married car salesman Roger Clinton. Her 3-year-old son, William, then joined them as they moved to Hot Springs, Arkansas, eventually taking his stepfather's surname and, later, becoming the 42nd President of the United States as Bill Clinton
- Born: Ann Wilson, lead singer of the rock band Heart, in San Diego, California

== June 20, 1950 (Tuesday) ==
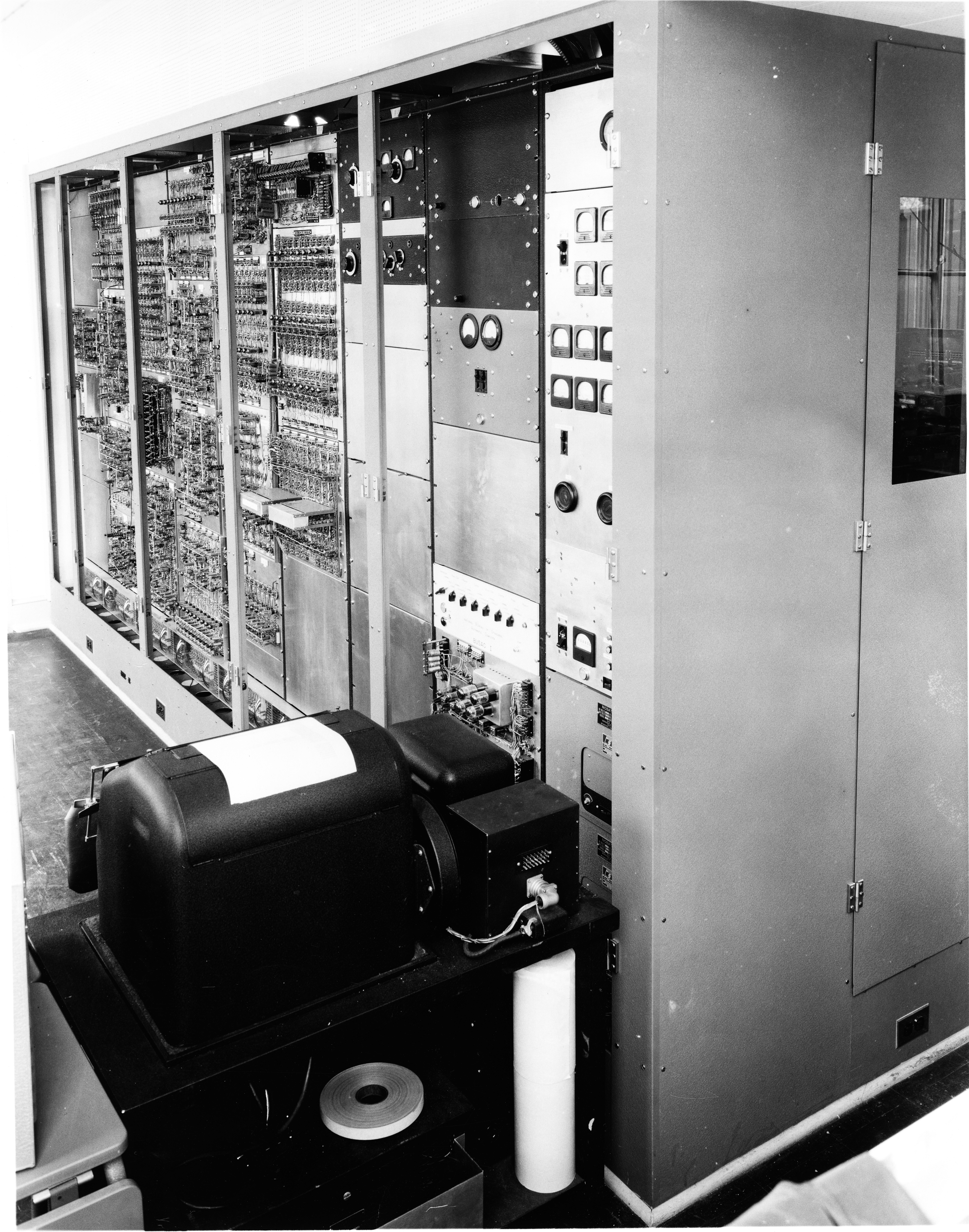
SEAC

- The fastest electronic computer up to that time, SEAC (Standards Electronic Automatic Computer), went into operation for the U.S. National Bureau of Standards.
- Baseball's New York Giants signed Willie Mays to a contract. At the time, Mays was a high school student playing for the Birmingham Black Barons in the Negro American League.
- The U.S. Senate voted 81-2 to revise the Social Security Act, doubling the monthly payment and adding the number of persons eligible, although permanent disability was still not covered.
- Secretary of State Dean Acheson told a U.S. Senate committee that it was unlikely that North Korea would go to war with South Korea. The invasion of South Korea would take place five days later.
- Soviet leader Joseph Stalin published the "Marxism and Problems of Linguistics" in the Communist Party daily newspaper Pravda, condemning the linguistic theories of Nikolai Marr, particularly that the world's languages had been developed from a single "proto-language". Without the endorsement from the Soviet Union's only political party, Marr's theories were largely abandoned by Soviet linguists, and an emphasis on Russian-language research was promoted instead.
- Born: Nouri al-Maliki, Prime Minister of Iraq 2006-2014; in Hindiya

== June 21, 1950 (Wednesday) ==
- The U.S. Senate voted, 42-29, to remove an amendment to the legislation renewing the military draft, that would have restored racially segregated units to the U.S. armed forces. Proposed by U.S. Senator Richard Russell of Georgia, and adopted unanimously by the Senate Armed Services Committee, the amendment would have reversed the 1948 integration of the services ordered by President Truman, by giving draftees the option to serve in an all-white or all-black unit. Senate Majority Leader Scott W. Lucas, of Illinois, then presented the counter-legislation to remove the Russell Amendment.
- Born:
  - Joey Kramer, American rock musician and drummer for Aerosmith, in the Bronx
  - Vasilis Papakonstantinou, Greek singer, in Vastas

== June 22, 1950 (Thursday) ==
- "American Business Consultants", an anti-Communist organization operated by three former FBI men, issued the booklet Red Channels. Subtitled "The Report of Communist Influence in Radio and Television", the book was a list of names of actors, directors, writers and producers that the Consultants identified either as members of the Communist Party, or sympathizers ("fellow travelers").
- David Greenglass, a technician with the Oak Ridge and Los Alamos facilities in the American nuclear program, was arrested and charged with spying for the Soviet Union. He implicated his sister and her husband (Ethel Rosenberg and Julius Rosenberg), as the persons who recruited him to the espionage. He agreed to testify against both of them, and would draw a reduced prison sentence. His wife, Ruth Greenglass, was never charged despite being identified as a Soviet agent. Greenglass would be released in 1960, and live until 2014. His sister and brother-in-law would be executed in 1953.
- The Walt Disney live-action adventure film Treasure Island starring Bobby Driscoll and Robert Newton had its world premiere in London.
- Died: Jane Cowl, 66, American film and stage actress

== June 23, 1950 (Friday) ==
- Northwest Orient Airlines Flight 2501, a DC-4 airplane on its way from New York to Minneapolis, crashed into Lake Michigan, near Milwaukee, after running into storms. All 58 persons on board were killed. More than sixty years later, neither the wreckage of the plane, nor any of the 58 people, had been located; the only trace of the plane was a blanket with the Northwest Airlines logo.
- The University of California Board of Regents approved the firing of 157 faculty members who had refused to sign an oath against Communism.

== June 24, 1950 (Saturday) ==
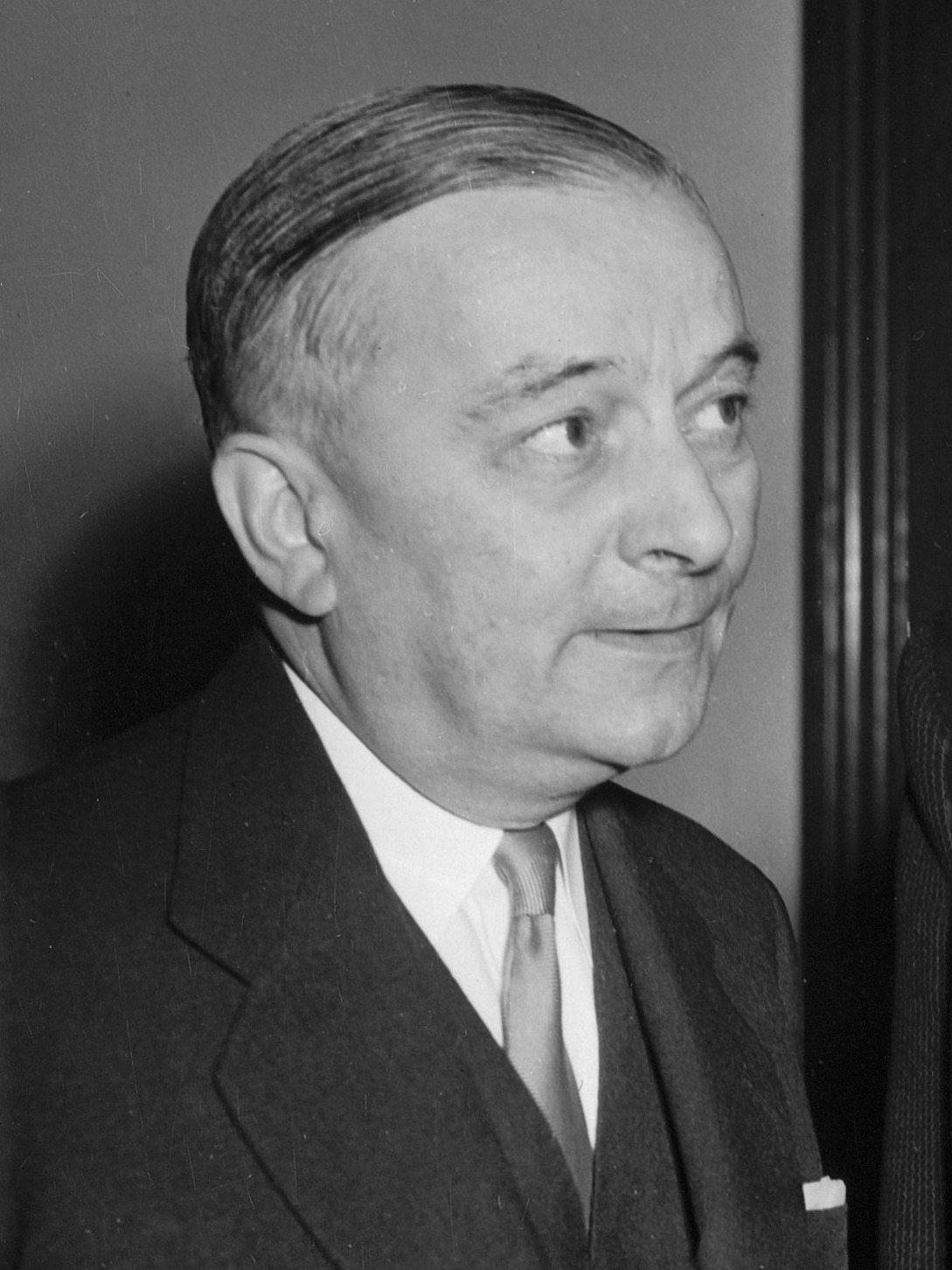
Bidault

- French Prime Minister Georges Bidault and his cabinet resigned after losing a vote of confidence in Parliament, 230-352.
- The 1950 FIFA World Cup competition, first in 12 years, opened at the new Estadio do Maracana in Rio de Janeiro, as 81,000 fans turned out to watch host nation Brazil defeat Mexico 4-0.
- Born:
  - Nancy Allen, American actress best known as Officer Lewis in the Robocop film series; in New York City
  - Janet Farrar, British author on witchcraft and Wiccan priestess; in Clapham

== June 25, 1950 (Sunday) ==
Outbreak of the Korean War

- The Korean War began at 4:00 in the morning KST (June 24 – 7pm UTC), South Korean army bases near the border with North Korea, at Yeoncheon, came under fire without warning. After 45 minutes of shelling, North Korean troops invaded with six infantry divisions, an armored brigade and three border brigades coming across the 38th parallel. With many of their personnel on weekend leave, the four South Korean divisions in the area were quickly overwhelmed, and the invaders proceeded toward the South Korean capital of Seoul, 40 miles (64 km) to the south.
- In response to the North Korean invasion, United Nations Security Council Resolution 82 was voted upon, calling for "an immediate cessation of hostilities" and for "North Korea to withdraw forthwith their armed forces to the 38th parallel". The vote was 9-0, with the USSR absent and Yugoslavia abstaining.

== June 26, 1950 (Monday) ==
- The African National Congress held a "National Day of Protest" with black South Africans turning out to demonstrate against the recently enacted Suppression of Communism Act.
- Brigadier General Yi Hyong Gun, commander of the Second Division of the South Korean Army, decided against making a counter-attack against invading North Korean troops after determining "that the situation was out of control" and ordered a retreat toward Seoul. "His action", it would be noted later, "meant that there were no means to block the advancing North Korean People's Army", but General Yi would receive a promotion afterward.
- General Haj Ali Razmara became Prime Minister of Iran. Described by a later historian as "the wrong man at the wrong time for the wrong job", he would be assassinated on March 7, 1951.
- All 29 people on board an Australian National Airways flight were killed when the engines failed and the Douglas DC-4 was attempting to return to Guildford Airport near Perth.

== June 27, 1950 (Tuesday) ==
- By 7:30 pm, the 9th Regiment of the North Korean Army's Third Division had reached the suburbs of Seoul, the South Korean capital; by 9:30 pm, sixty-seven hours after the attack had started, North Korean tanks had arrived at the gardens of the Changdeokgung Palace.
- The Battle of Suwon Airfield was fought over Kimpo Airfield and Suwon Airfield, resulting in United Nations victory.
- U.S. President Harry S. Truman ordered warships of the United States Seventh Fleet to assist South Korean forces in their resistance of the North Korean invasion. At the same time, President Truman ordered the Seventh Fleet to the coast of Communist China in order to prevent an attack upon the Nationalist Chinese outpost on the island of Taiwan, reversing his previous decision not to intervene in the Chinese Civil War.
- With North Korea refusing to withdraw its forces from South Korea, United Nations Security Council Resolution 83 was voted upon, as a recommendation that "the Members of the United Nations furnish such assistance to the Republic of Korea as may be necessary to repel the armed attack". The vote was 7-1, with Yugoslavia opposing, Egypt and India abstaining, and the USSR — a permanent member which could have vetoed the resolution —absent because it had walked out of the UN on January 10.

== June 28, 1950 (Wednesday) ==
- The bombing of the Hangang Bridge was carried out by the South Korean Army as hundreds of refugees were still fleeing across it, in an effort to prevent invading North Korean troops from advancing any further. As the North Korean Army approached the Han River, engineers of the Republic of Korea (ROK) Army of South Korea had rigged explosives. In the meantime, South Korean civilians and soldiers were fleeing across to avoid being trapped behind enemy lines. Detonation of the bombs at the main bridge, at Hangang, had been set for 1:30 a.m. General Kim Pak Il, the ROK Deputy Chief of Staff, delayed the blast for 45 minutes, but at 2:15 a.m., the blast order was given, destroying two spans of the Hangang Bridge and dropping thousands of persons in a 75-foot plunge to the river, killing at least 500 people; a railroad bridge across the river remained standing, however. The ROK Chief Engineer, Choi Chang-sik, would be blamed for the mistake and executed. North Korean forces captured Seoul at noon, three days and eight hours after the invasion began.
- The U.S. Air Force used jet airplanes in battle for the first time, when Lt. Bryce D. Poe II flew an RF-80F on a reconnaissance mission; the first use of American jets in combat would take place on July 3.

== June 29, 1950 (Thursday) ==
- In the group stage round of the 1950 FIFA World Cup competition, the United States national soccer football team upset the heavily favored England team, 1-0, in the 1950 World Cup in Belo Horizonte, with Joe Gaetjens scoring the winning goal past Bert Williams in the 39th minute of play. The win went almost unnoticed in the American sports press.
- For the first time since it had been elevated to Test status in 1928, the West Indies cricket team defeated England. The victory came on England's home ground at Lord's Cricket Ground in London, with the West Indies winning by 326 runs (326-151 in the first innings, 425-274 in the second)
- U.S. President Harry S. Truman held a press conference, where the phrase "police action" was first used to describe the Korean War. One reporter prefaced a question with the statement, "Mr. President, everybody is asking in this country, are we or are we not at war?" to which Truman replied, "We are not at war." Another reporter, not identified in the record, followed up a few minutes later with the question, "Mr. President, would it be correct, against your explanation, to call this a police action under the United Nations?", and Truman responded, "Yes. That is exactly what it amounts to." One observer would note later that "Truman was constrained to answer that way", in that he had not asked the U.S. Congress to declare war and "did not want to validate the charge that he had circumvented the Constitution".
- Born: Don Moen, American gospel music producer and singer, in Minneapolis

== June 30, 1950 (Friday) ==
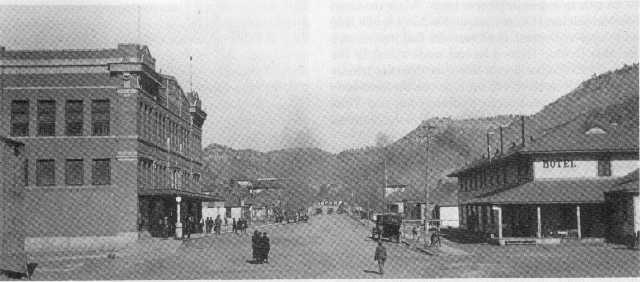
Dawson, N.M. in 1916

- The last of the 1,200 residents of the town of Dawson, New Mexico, moved away. The Phelps Dodge Corporation, which owned the town's land and which had built the houses and businesses for use by its employees and their families, had issued a notice on March 31, announcing that its Dawson Mine would close on April 28 and that "All residents of Dawson will be expected to vacate their premises on or before June 30, 1950." At its height, the town had 9,000 people.
- U.S. President Truman signed a law extending the drafting of men into the military, days before the selective service program had been scheduled to expire. The bill, passed by Congress the day before, initially exempted veterans of World War II from being called up, and covered all men between the ages of 19 and 25, for up to twenty-one months of military service.
- Robert Dale Segee, a patient in a mental institution and former circus worker, confessed to the Ohio State Fire Marshal as having been the person who caused the Hartford circus fire, which killed 167 people on July 6, 1944. Segee would later recant the confession, and in 1993, a Connecticut State Police investigation would conclude that the blaze had been started by accident.
- Nine minutes before he was scheduled to die in the gas chamber at 10:00 am, convicted child rapist Claude Shackleford got a temporary reprieve from North Carolina Governor W. Kerr Scott, when the victim informed the state Parole Commissioner that she hadn't told the whole truth. Three weeks later, after presenting no new evidence, Shackleford was executed on July 21.
- U.S. warplanes began bombing installations in North Korea and in Communist held South Korean territory, with 27 attacks on the North Korean capital of Pyongyang.
- Born: Leonard Whiting, British actor and Golden Globe winner for his 1968 portrayal of Romeo in the Franco Zeffirelli production of Romeo and Juliet
