= July 1950 =

Month of 1950

<<	July 1950					>>
Su	Mo	Tu	We	Th	Fr	Sa
						1
2	3	4	5	6	7	8
9	10	11	12	13	14	15
16	17	18	19	20	21	22
23	24	25	26	27	28	29
30	31

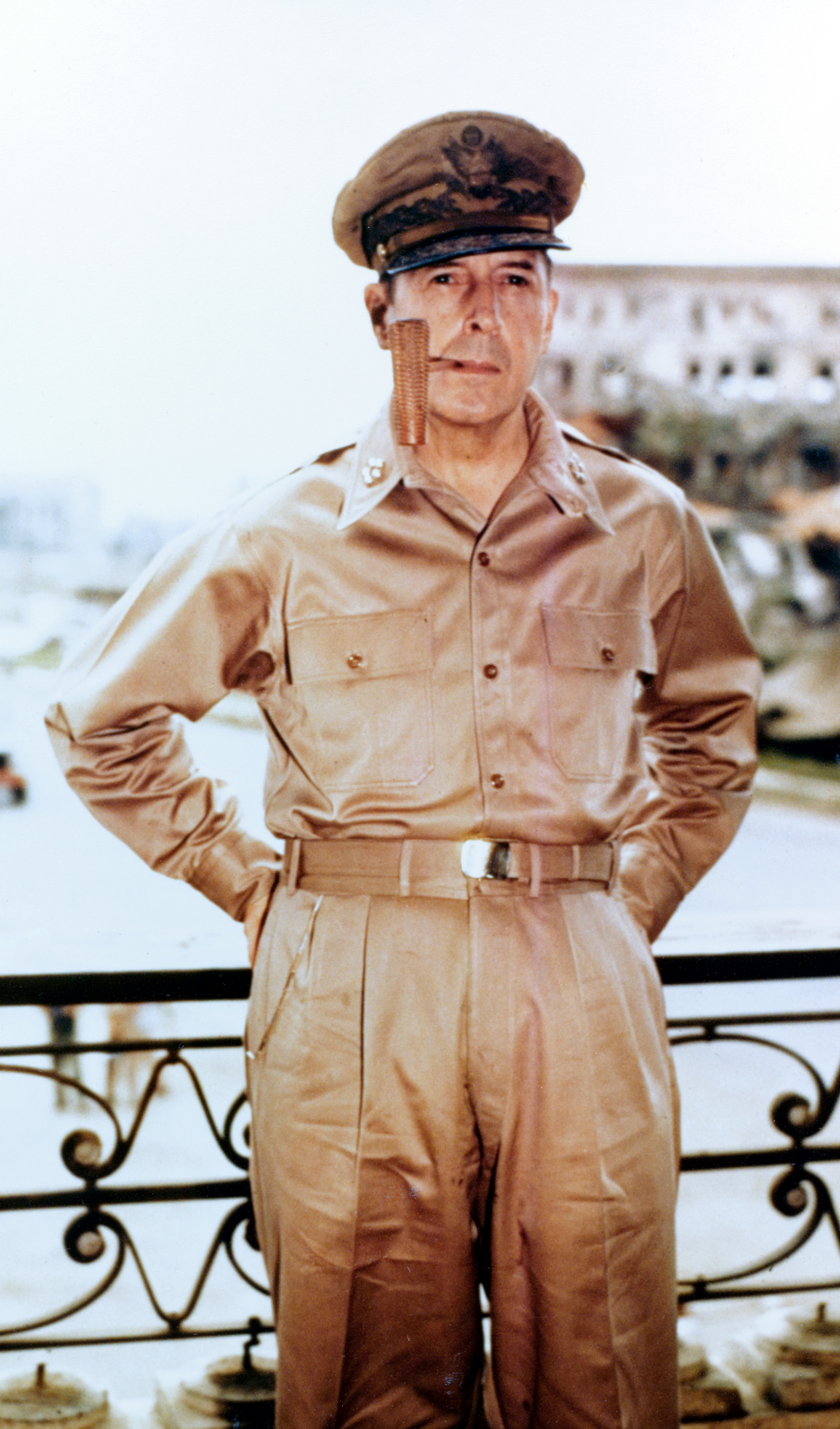
July 9, 1950: General MacArthur appointed commander of U.S. forces in Korea, asks Joint Chiefs for atomic weapons

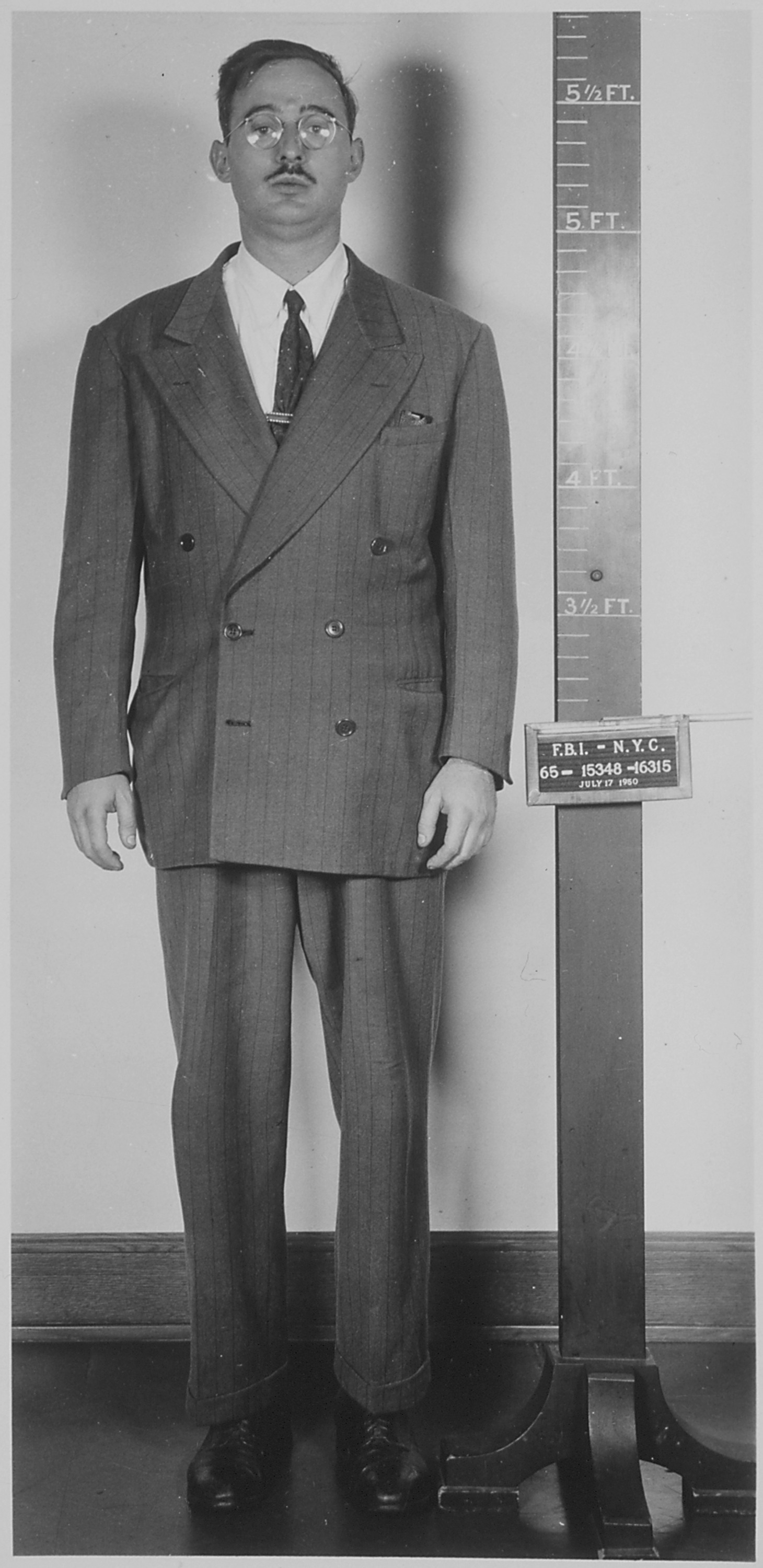
July 17, 1950: Julius Rosenberg arrested for espionage

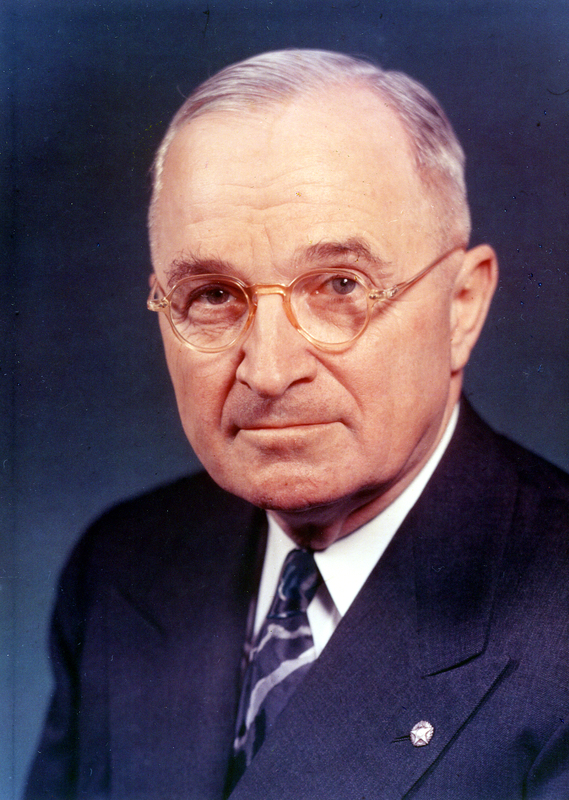
July 30, 1950: U.S. President Truman transfers partially assembled nuclear bombs to Guam air base

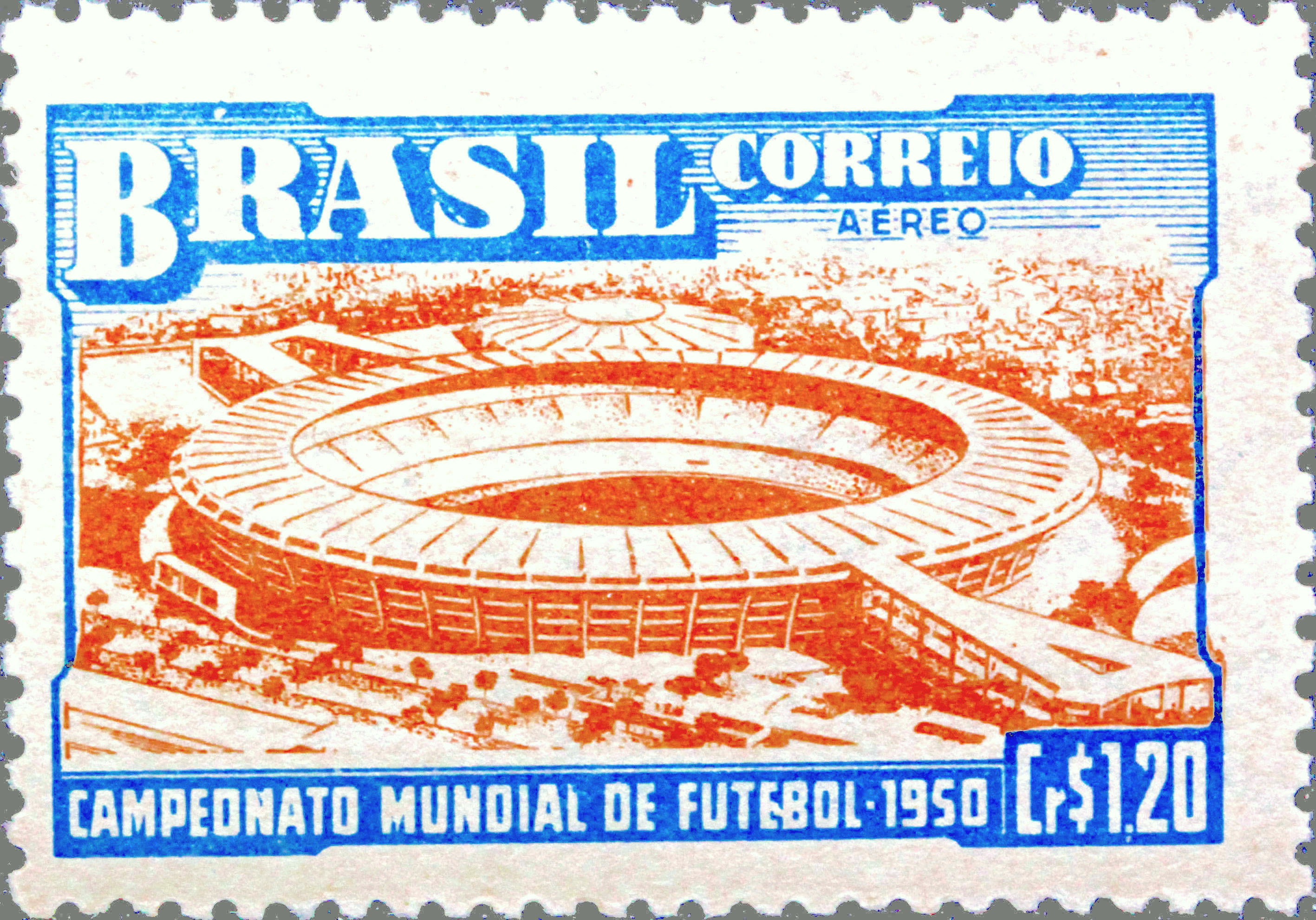
July 16, 1950: Brazil hosts World Cup Final

The following events occurred in July 1950:

== July 1, 1950 (Saturday) ==
- Two companies of the U.S. Army First Battalion, 21st Infantry Regiment, 24th Infantry Division departed from the U.S. base in Japan at Kyushu under the name "Task Force Smith", designated because of its 34-year-old commander, Lt. Col. Charles "Brad" Smith. After leaving at 3:00 am, the task force arrived near Pusan at 11:00 am, becoming the first set of American ground troops to be deployed in the Korean War.
- The 8055th M.A.S.H. became the first Mobile Army Surgical Hospital to be activated in South Korea. On July 6, its physicians, nurses and support staff would be sent from Sasebo to Pusan, initially to be set up at Taejon. It was followed by the 8063rd M.A.S.H. (often referenced in the television show M*A*S*H), which was activated July 17 and sent on July 18 to Pohang to support the U.S. 1st Cavalry, and the 8076th M.A.S.H. (activated July 19, and sent to Taejon on July 25)
- Twenty-three American soldiers became the first to die in the Korean War when their C-54 transport plane crashed into a 2000 foot high hill, forty miles northwest of Pusan, upon arrival from Japan.
- Eleven men were killed and 26 injured when a gas leak at the iron works in Consett, England, felled them while they were working at a loading dock.
- ARAADCOM, the ARmy AntiAircraft COMmand, began operations to coordinate U.S. Army defenses against a foreign bomber attack. The unit would be deactivated on January 4, 1975.
- The city of Gainesville, Florida renamed all of its main streets using a system of numbers and directions.
- Unto These Hills, which bills itself as "America's most popular outdoor drama", was given its first performance. It continues to be seen on Saturday evenings during the summer at Cherokee, North Carolina.
- Born: David Duke, American politician and Ku Klux Klan leader; in Tulsa, Oklahoma

== July 2, 1950 (Sunday) ==
- The Battle of Chumonchin Chan, the first and only naval battle of the Korean War, took place when HMS Jamaica, USS Juneau and HMS Black Swan fought the North Korean Navy and sank three torpedo boats and two gunboats off of the east coast of South Korea, near Jumunjin.

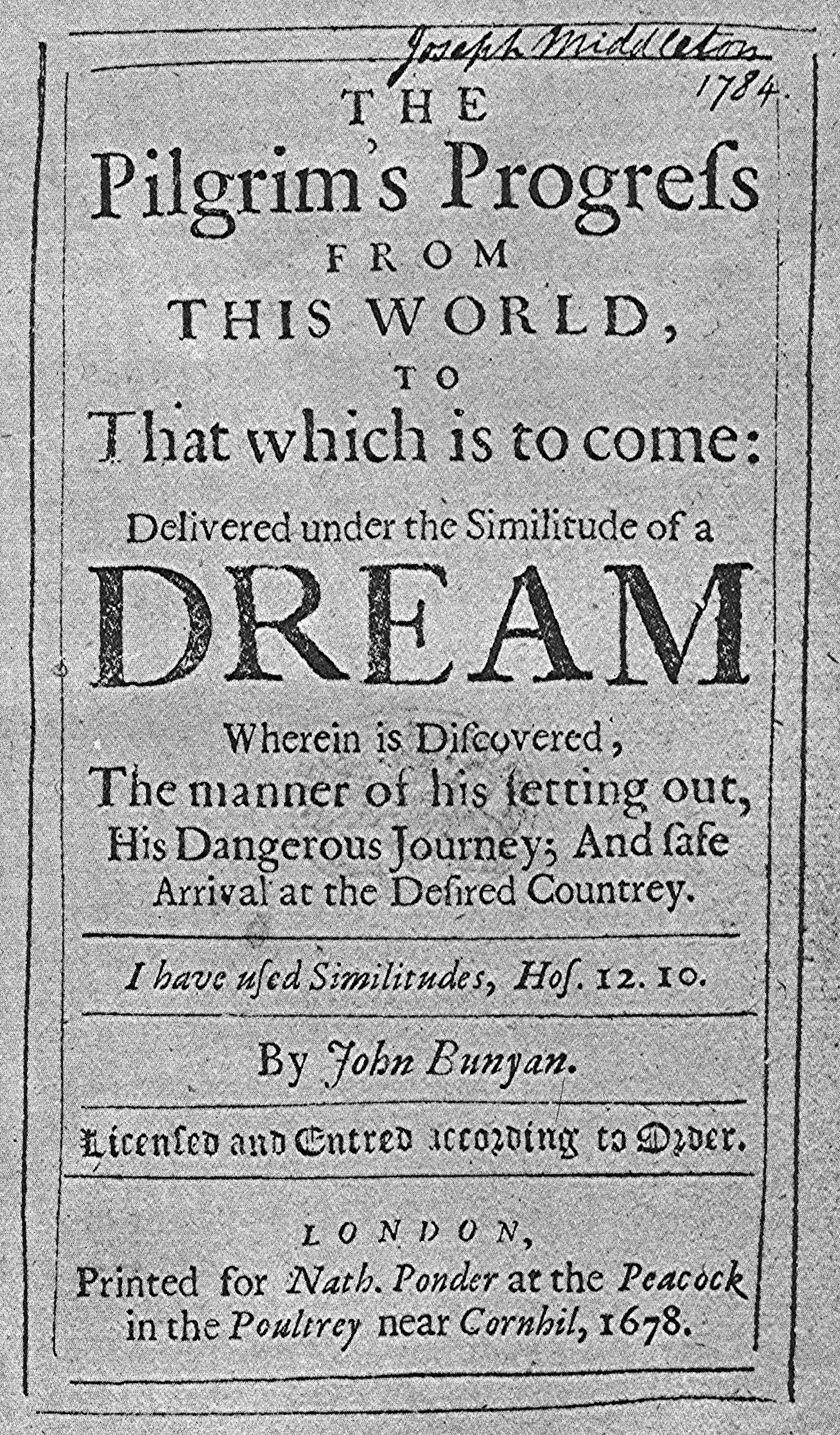
Voted "most boring"

- The John Bunyan novel Pilgrim's Progress, first published in 1678, was named the most boring classic book in a survey of literary critics by the Columbia University Press. Rounding out the list were Moby Dick, Paradise Lost (by John Milton), The Faerie Queene, Life of Samuel Johnson, Pamela; or, Virtue Rewarded, Silas Marner, Ivanhoe, Don Quixote and Faust.
- General Manuel A. Odria was elected President of Peru. He was the only candidate on the ballot.

== July 3, 1950 (Monday) ==
- The Puerto Rican Federal Relations Act was signed into law by U.S. President Truman, giving Puerto Rico the authority to establish its own government to administer "matters of purely local concern".
- New Zealand dispatched its first troops to the Korean War, as the ships HMNZS Pukaki and HMNZS Tutira departed to aid the UN war effort.
- An express train crashed into an excursion bus near Bourg-en-Bresse in France, killing 23 people on the bus.
- In a cablegram sent from North Korea's Foreign Minister, Pak Hen Nen, to United Nations Secretary General Trygve Lie, North Korea announced that it had no intention of agreeing to the UN Security Council resolution 82, calling for an end to hostilities and withdrawal of troops.
- The first U.S. Navy jet attack in the Korean War took place when a Grumman F9F Panther took off from the USS Valley Forge to attack North Korean troops. Ensign Eldon W. Brown Jr., made the first kill, downing a Yak-9 fighter near Pyongyang, before returning to the Valley Forge.

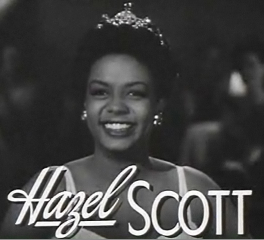

- The Hazel Scott Show made its debut on the DuMont Television Network, becoming the first television program to be hosted by an African-American woman. Singer Hazel Scott appeared live on Monday, Wednesday and Friday evenings from 7:45 pm to 8:00 pm Eastern Time on DuMont stations.
- The CBS Radio Network show Granby's Green Acres, created by Jay Sommers, made its debut as a summer replacement series. Starring Gale Gordon and Bea Benaderet as John and Martha Granby, two big city residents who became farmers. Though the radio show ran only eight episodes, it would be adapted to television 15 years later as Green Acres
- The Swedish State Railways luxury cruise train Sunlit Nights Land Cruises departed from Stockholm toward northern Sweden on its inaugural run. The service would operate until 1969.
- Died: Lucy Deane Streatfeild, 84, Indian-born British social worker and civil servant

== July 4, 1950 (Tuesday) ==
- Radio Free Europe began its first broadcasts, transmitting 30 minutes of American programming to Czechoslovakia from a 7,500 watt short wave transmitter located at Lampertheim in West Germany.
- French Premier Henri Queuille, in office for three days, resigned after losing in a vote of no confidence in the National Assembly, by a margin of 336–221.
- A baseball fan at New York's Polo Grounds was killed by a sniper as he sat in the stands along with 40,000 other people at a doubleheader between the Giants and the Dodgers. Bernard Doyle, 54, was struck in the eye while sitting in the second deck in deep left field. New York Police concluded that the bullet had been fired from one of the apartment buildings half a mile away from the ballpark.
- Turkey and Israel signed a trade agreement, their first treaty since Turkey's official recognition of Israel in 1949.

== July 5, 1950 (Wednesday) ==
- At 8:16 a.m., American and North Korean troops engaged in combat for the first time, at the Battle of Osan, 20 miles south of Seoul. Task Force Smith, with 406 U.S. Army troops led by Lieutenant Colonel Charles B. Smith, was far outnumbered when it encountered a column of 33 North Korean T-34 tanks and a large infantry force of 4,000. Four of the T-34 tanks were destroyed and three damaged, while 20 U.S. Marines became the first Americans to die in combat during the Korean War. The Americans sustained 120 deaths and 36 more were taken prisoner. Officially, Kenneth R. Shadrick, an 18-year-old native of Harlan, Kentucky, was the first American serviceman to be killed in action in the Korean War.
- The Law of Return (Hok Hashvut) was passed unanimously by the Knesset, the Parliament of Israel, providing that "An immigrant's visa shall be granted to every Jew who has expressed his desire to settle in Israel", with exceptions. Although one author comments that "Israel is the only country in the world which confers citizenship on an immigrant automatically at the moment he steps off the boat or plane"

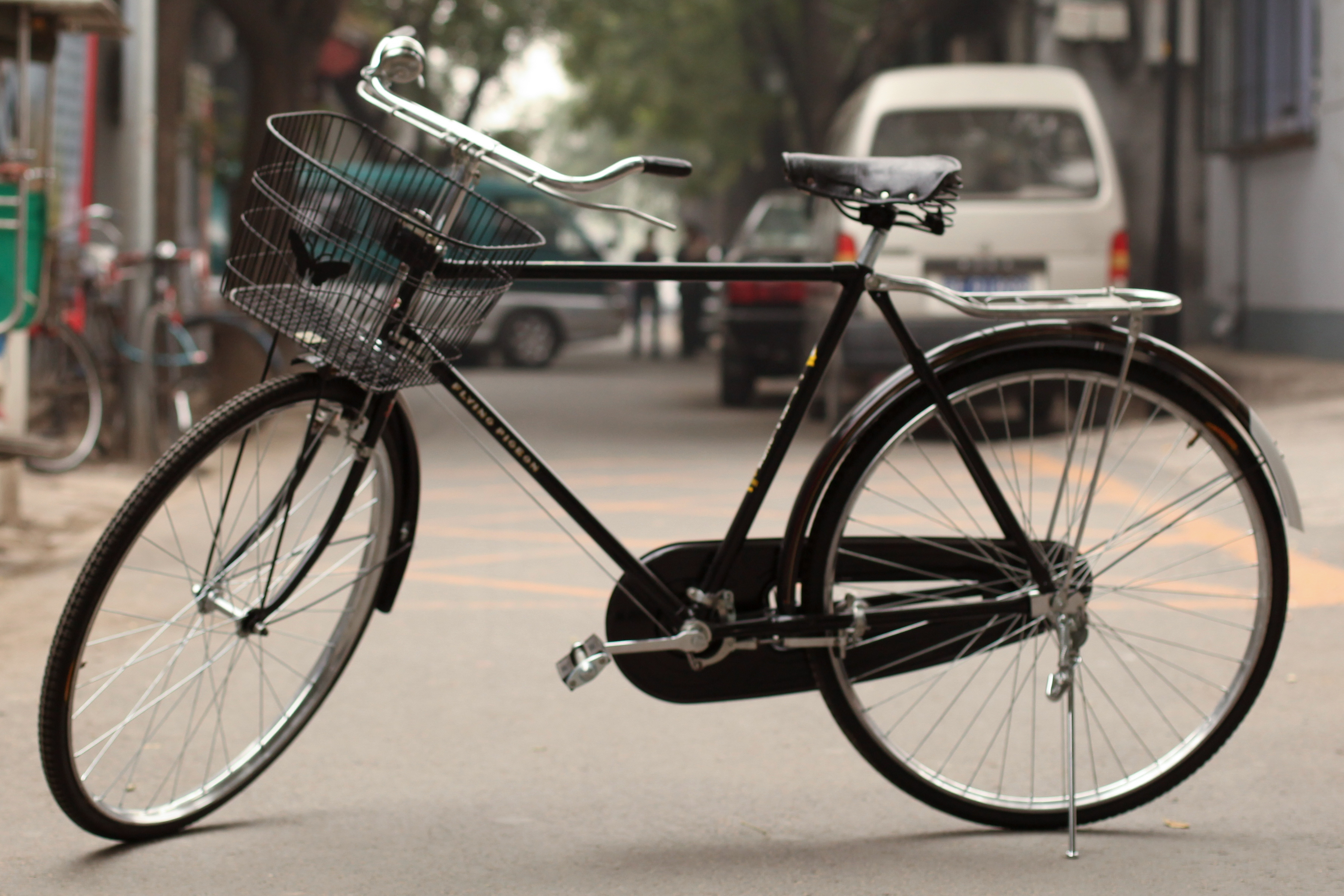
a Flying Pigeon bicycle

- The first "Flying Pigeon", a bicycle devised by Huo Baoji at a former artillery plant at Tianjin, was presented to officials of the Chinese Communist Party. Approved as the "People's Bicycle", millions of the bikes were produced and served as the personal vehicle for citizens of the People's Republic of China. Huo Baoji based his bicycle model on the 1932 English Raleigh Roadster.
- Prime Minister of Belgium Jean Duvieusart narrowly survived a vote of confidence in the Belgian Senate, winning 90–83. Duvieusart was a supporter of exiled King Leopold III, and the vote was seen as a narrow approval of Leopold's return.
- The Australian Department of Defence ordered the drafting of 14,000 men into its armed forces in order to fight in Korea.
- Born: Huey Lewis (stage name for Hugh Anthony Cregg III), American musician and frontman of Huey Lewis and the News; in New York City
- Died: Salvatore Giuliano, 27, Sicilian crime boss who had been charged with 117 counts of murder, was killed in a gunbattle with Italian carbinieri at Castelvetrano.

== July 6, 1950 (Thursday) ==
- U.S. and North Korean forces clashed for the second time at the Battle of Pyongtaek. The engagement resulted in a North Korean victory as the Americans were unable to stop their advance south.
- The Goerlitz Agreement (also called the Zgorzelec Agreement), marking the separation of the two cities of Görlitz in East Germany and Zgorzelec in Poland, was signed at Warsaw. It set the border between the two nations as the Oder (Odra) River and the Neisse (Nysa) River. The border would be confirmed on November 14, 1990, in a treaty signed between a reunified Germany and Poland on the reunification of Germany by the "Two plus Four Treaty" on September 12, 1990,
- David Greenglass became the second American atomic worker to be indicted for espionage.
- Born: John Byrne, British-born American comic writer and artist for Marvel and DC Comics; in Walsall

== July 7, 1950 (Friday) ==
- U.S. and North Korean forces engaged for the third time in the Battle of Chonan. The fight ended in a North Korean victory after intense fighting around the town throughout the night and into the morning.
- The U.S. Department of Defense implemented the newly renewed draft law "to build up to full operating strength the units of the Army, Navy and Air Force to be used in the Korean operation.
- Without a Soviet Union representative appearing to cast a veto against it, United Nations Security Council Resolution 84 passed, authorizing a multinational United Nations force, under U.S. command, to fight against North Korea. The Resolution noted that the Council "Recommends that all Members of the United Nations make such forces and other assistance available" Ultimately, 20 nations would send troops and 25 others would provide some form of aid. At a secret meeting in the White House earlier in the day, U.S. President Truman declined a suggestion from CIA Director Roscoe Hillenkoetter that the UN be asked to approve use of the atomic bomb in the war.
- The film noir Where the Sidewalk Ends starring Dana Andrews and Gene Tierney premiered in Los Angeles.
- The newspaper La Tercera de La Hora, edited in Santiago and owned by Copesa Group, is founded.
- Died: Fats Navarro, 26, American jazz trumpet player

== July 8, 1950 (Saturday) ==
- Nearly five years after Japan's armed forces surrender to the United States, General Douglas MacArthur gave approval for the creation of a National Police Reserve (Keisatsu Yobitai) of 75,000 soldiers to replace the former Japanese Army. In 1952, the force would be reorganized and in 1954 would become the Japan Self-Defense Forces (Jieitai) to include a navy and air force. .

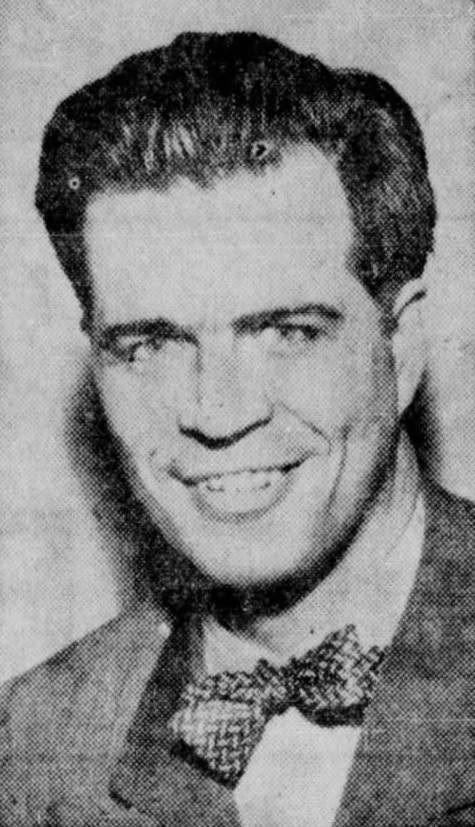
Governor Williams

- G. Mennen Williams, the Governor of Michigan, was attacked and briefly taken hostage by inmates at the Marquette Branch Prison while making a personal visit to investigate complaints about the conditions. One of his attackers was shot dead.
- U.S. President Harry S. Truman named General Douglas MacArthur as commanding general of the United Nations forces in Korea.
- U.S. Army Sergeant Roy Deans was awarded the first Purple Heart medal of the Korean war, after having an eye injury during the June 28 destruction of the Han River bridge.
- Results from the 1950 U.S. population census showed that New York City had 7,841,610 people, still second to London, with 8,390,941 people.
- in Mexico the Querétaro Fútbol Club is founded
- Died:
  - Guy Gilpatric, 54, American author of the Colin Glencannon stories, by suicide, after killing his wife Maude, who was terminally ill with cancer.
  - Helen Holmes, 58, American silent film actress who appeared in 119 episodes of the serial The Hazards of Helen between 1914 and 1917

== July 9, 1950 (Sunday) ==
- The U.S. Joint Chiefs of Staff received a message from General Douglas MacArthur asking for consideration of making atomic bombs available for use in the Korean War. General Charles Bolte, the JCS Chief of Operations, advised the Joint Chiefs that as many as 20 of the 250 American A-bombs could be spared for what MacArthur described as "a unique use of the atomic bomb" to destroy tunnels and bridges leading into North Korea from China. The JCS tabled the motion, as well as MacArthur's request for additional U.S. troops, until "two of their number" could visit Korea personally . U.S. Army General J. Lawton Collins and U.S. Air Force General Hoyt S. Vandenberg would arrive in Tokyo on July 13.
- Earthquakes in the Santander Department of Colombia killed more than 200 people, with the towns of Cucutilla and Arboledas hit the hardest.
- First propaganda broadcast by an American POW captured by North Korea; a U.S. Army Officer of the 24th Infantry Division made a 900 word broadcast on Seoul radio. Broadcasts from other officers followed, and behavioral researchers made the first studies of what Edward Hunter would first refer to as "brainwashing".
- Bishop Alexei Kim Euihan, a South Korean who had been ordained as a priest in the Russian Orthodox Church, was kidnapped and never seen again, bringing a temporary end to the Korean Orthodox Church. The orthodox church organization would not be re-established until 1994.
- Born: Viktor Yanukovych, President of Ukraine from 2010 to 2014; in Yenakiyevo, Ukrainian SSR, USSR

== July 10, 1950 (Monday) ==
- United Kingdom Food Minister Maurice Webb announced that rationing of soap would end effective September 10, 1950. Since February 9, 1942, households had been permitted only three ounces of soap, per person, per week.
- The refugee camp for displaced persons at Bergen (Lower Saxony), West Germany closed permanently after the last of its 1,000 DPs departed. The Bergen camp had opened in 1946 on the site of the Bergen-Belsen concentration camp.
- Died: Richard Maury, 67, American-born Argentine engineer who designed the first railway to link Argentina to Chile.

== July 11, 1950 (Tuesday) ==
- The International Court of Justice (commonly known as the World Court) ruled unanimously that the Class C Mandate exercised by South Africa over South-West Africa (now Namibia), continued to be binding, and that South Africa was not required to turn the former German colony into a United Nations trust territory. On December 17, 1920, the League of Nations had conferred the mandate upon South Africa. All of the mandates had become UN Trust Territories, with the exception of South Africa, which refused to relinquish any control. The matter had been turned over to the World Court in 1949, by a 40–7 vote of the General Assembly. South Africa would finally agree in 1988 to allow the UN to oversee Namibia's transition to independence.
- The National League defeated the American League 4–3 in 14 innings at the 17th Major League Baseball All-Star Game at Comiskey Park in Chicago. It was the first midsummer classic to go into extra innings.
- Andy Pandy debuted on BBC Television.
- Born: Pervez Hoodbhoy, Pakistani nuclear physicist; in Karachi
- Died: Buddy DeSylva, 55, American songwriter

== July 12, 1950 (Wednesday) ==
- Television broadcasting started again in Germany for the first time since before World War Two, as the company Nordwestdeutscher Rundfunk (NWDR) began transmission. Broadcasts every two days would begin in November, and daily broadcasts would start on December 25, 1952.
- The three-day Battle of Chochiwon ended with North Korean victory.
- Canada sent its first military forces to aid in the Korean War, placing the Royal Canadian Navy destroyers HMCS Cayuga, HMCS Athabaskan and HMCS Sioux under UN Command.
- The South Korean government, temporarily relocated from Seoul to Taejon, entered the "Taejon Agreement" with the United States, giving U.S. military courts exclusive jurisdiction over American personnel in criminal and civil matters.
- The Roman Catholic church in Communist East Germany was placed under the administration of the Berliner Ordinarienkonferenz (BOK), which would exist until 1976.
- Casino gambling was revived in Austria for the first time since its conquest by Germany in 1938, with the casino at the resort town of Bad Gastein being first to reopen.
- Born: Eric Carr, American musician and drummer for Kiss; in Brooklyn (d. 1991)
- Died: Elsie de Wolfe, 84, American socialite and interior decorator, author of the 1913 book on interior design, The House in Good Taste

== July 13, 1950 (Thursday) ==
- General Walton H. Walker was named as the commander of United States ground forces in South Korea. He would be killed in a motor vehicle accident less than six months later.
- The People's Republic of China created the Northeast Border Defense Army, dispatching four regiments to its border with North Korea.
- West Germany became the 14th member state of the Council of Europe.
- Born: Ma Ying-jeou, President of the Republic of China 2008 to 2016; in Kowloon, British Hong Kong

== July 14, 1950 (Friday) ==
- The Battle of Taejon began as forces of the U.S. Army attempted to defend the headquarters of the 24th Infantry Division.
- Christian evangelist Billy Graham prayed in the White House with U.S. President Harry S. Truman, the first of many meetings that Graham would have with American presidents. Graham would meet with every American president over the next 60 years.
- South Korea's President Syngman Rhee signed the "Letter in Regard to Transfer of Operational Authority", transferring command of the Republic of Korea armed forces directly to the command of General Douglas MacArthur.
- Brigadier General William L. Roberts, in charge of the U.S. mission in South Korea before the war, told reporters in Los Angeles that heavy military equipment had not been provided to South Korea prior to the outbreak of war, because of fears that South Korea had wanted to start a war with North Korea.
- Romania became the second Communist nation to be sent broadcasts from Radio Free Europe.

== July 15, 1950 (Saturday) ==
- Nâzım Hikmet Ran, Turkish poet and novelist who had been imprisoned since January 17, 1938, on charges of "provoking military personnel to rebel against their superiors", was released after receiving a pardon from the new government.
- "Mona Lisa" by Nat King Cole topped the Billboard Best Sellers in Stores chart.
- Born Arianna Huffington, Greek-born American journalist and syndicated columnist known for her 2005 co-founding The Huffington Post investigative website; as Ariadnē-Anna Stassinopoúlou in Athens
- Died: Heinz-Wolfgang Schnaufer, 28, German World War II ace and four-time winner of the Knight's Cross, who had 121 victories at night; two days after a truck collided with his car and spilled its cargo on top of him.

== July 16, 1950 (Sunday) ==
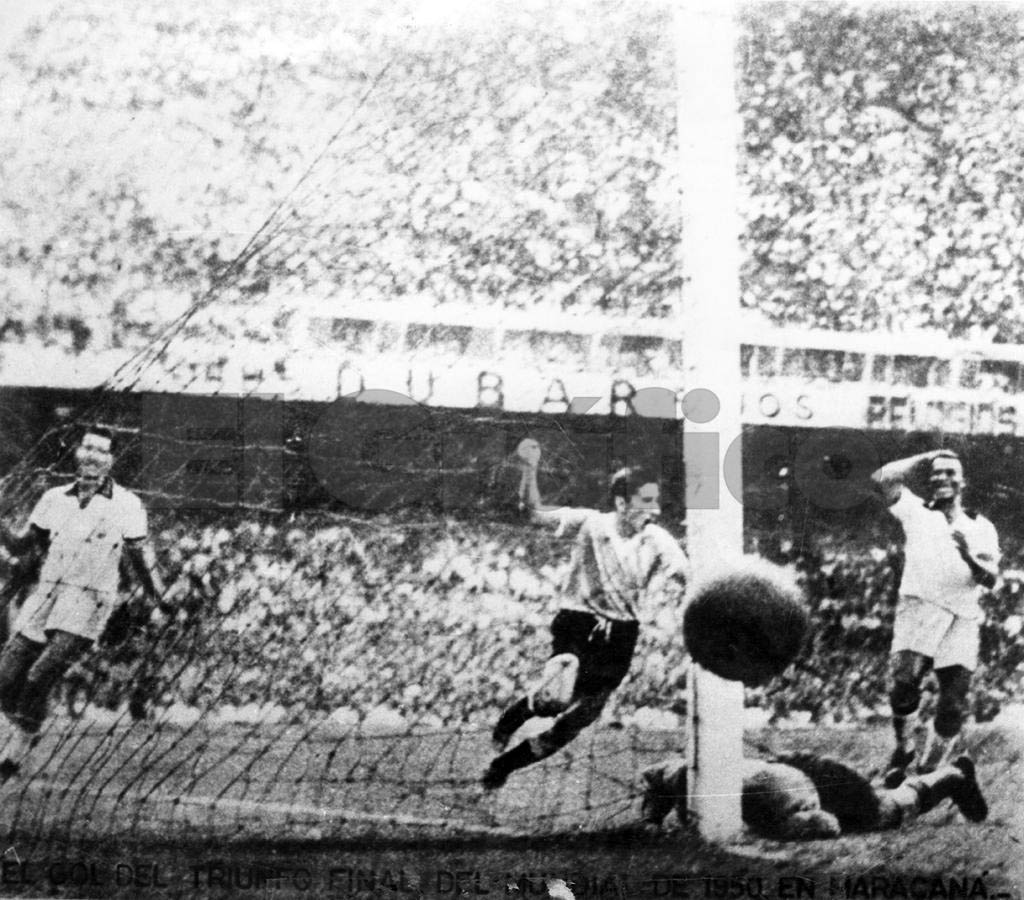
Ghiggia scores the winning goal for Uruguay

- Uruguay won the 1950 World Cup, beating Brazil 2–1 to win the first world soccer football championship played since 1938. A crowd of 210,000 was present at the Estádio do Maracanã in Rio de Janeiro as the heavily favored home team played the final match of a round robin tournament involving Brazil, Uruguay, Sweden and Spain. As it turned out, the last game on the schedule pitted Uruguay (with one loss and one tie) against Brazil (with two wins). Brazil would take the Cup with either a win or a tie, and the score was 0–0 at halftime. Brazil went ahead 1–0 in the 47th minute with a goal by Albino Friaça, and Uruguay's Juan Alberto Schiaffino tied the score at 1–1 in the 66th minute (Schiaffino); "But then, with eleven minutes to go, the unthinkable happened," an author would write later, when Alcides Ghiggia scored the winning goal, and Brazil was unable to respond. The upset at Maracanã stadium would become known in Uruguay as El Maracanazo.
- Secretary-General S.A. Dange and ten other officials of the Communist Party of India were released from prison after having been incarcerated for more than two years, while 38 other Communists were given a reprieve from a detention order.

== July 17, 1950 (Monday) ==
- The U.S. House of Representatives defeated a bill for a constitutional amendment that would have made the Electoral College almost irrelevant, after the U.S. Senate had overwhelmingly (64–27) approved the measure on February 1. The vote on the Lodge-Gossett resolution was 134 for, 210 against.
- Julius Rosenberg, 32, was arrested at his 11th floor Manhattan apartment on 10 Monroe Street, while the family was listening to The Lone Ranger on the radio. Rosenberg had been fired in 1945 as civilian inspector for the U.S. Army Signal Corps, and had been identified by his brother-in-law, David Greenglass, as a spy. Ethel Rosenberg, the wife of Julius and David's sister, would be arrested on August 11. On March 21, 1951, the Rosenbergs would be convicted of espionage; both would be executed in the electric chair on June 19, 1953. Although there was doubt about their guilt, former Soviet spy Alexander Feklisov would claim, in 1997, to have had fifty meetings with Rosenberg.
- The city of St. Louis, Missouri, was ordered by a federal judge to desegregate all of its municipal swimming pools within two days, ending the status quo of separate swimming facilities for white people and black people. In 1949, the city had closed all of its pools for the summer rather than allow blacks to swim in "whites only" pools.
- Died: Evangeline Booth, 84, first woman General of The Salvation Army (1934–1939), and fourth overall

== July 18, 1950 (Tuesday) ==
- UNESCO, the United Nations Educational, Scientific and Cultural Organization, published its first Statement on Race, authored by eight scientists led by Professor Ashley Montagu. The statement began with the words, "Scientists have reached general agreement in recognising that mankind is one: that all men belong to the same species, Homo sapiens."
- Major General William F. Dean of the U.S. Army was separated from his unit after North Korean troops overran the city of Taejon. Dean would spend the next 36 days eluding North Korean patrols and trying to make his way back to friendly territory, until he was betrayed to the enemy on August 25 by a South Korean civilian. As a Major General, Dean would be the North Koreans' most important prisoner of war, and finally be released on September 4, 1953.
- Born:
  - Richard Branson, English billionaire businessman and founder of the Virgin Group conglomerate; in London
  - Jack Layton, Canadian politician who led the New Democratic Party 2003-2011 and was Leader of the Opposition for three months until his death in 2011; in Montreal. (d. 2011)
  - Glenn Hughes, American bass singer for the Village People; in New York (d. 2001)

== July 19, 1950 (Wednesday) ==
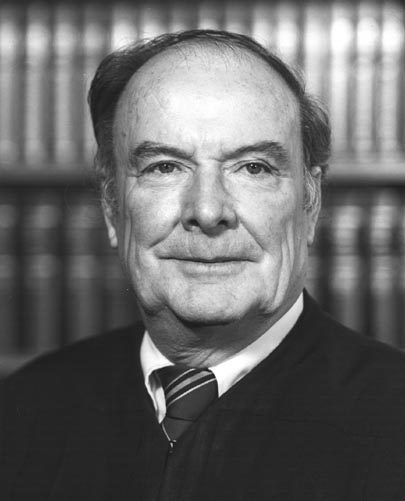
Judge Wright

- In New Orleans, U.S. District Judge J. Skelly Wright issued an injunction prohibiting Washington Parish, Louisiana from any further rejection of African American citizens from registering to vote. On July 28, William Bailey, who brought the federal lawsuit after being denied since 1946, would become the first black registered voter in the 20th Century. About fifty other black persons registered later that day at the courthouse in Bogalusa.

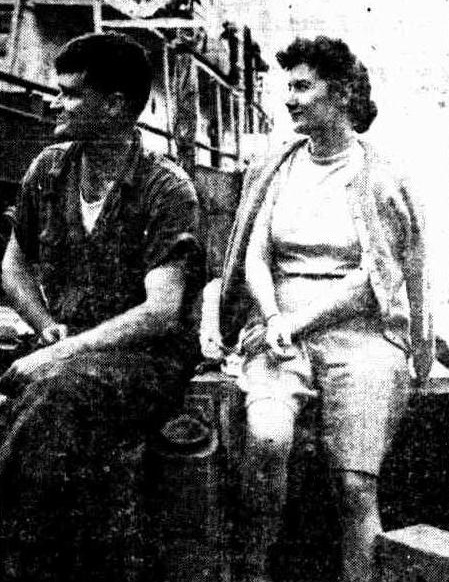
Mr. and Mrs. Carlin

- Ben Carlin and his wife, Elinore Carlin, set out from Halifax, Nova Scotia, in the Half-Safe, an amphibious jeep, in an effort to become the first persons to drive around the world. Mrs. Carlin would abandon the journey after several years because of seasickness, and Mr. Carlin, after long stops along the way, would complete his journey on May 13, 1958, nearly eight years after starting. He had driven 39,000 miles on land, and traversed 9,600 miles on the ocean.
- Walt Disney Studios' first completely live-action film, Treasure Island, made its debut.

== July 20, 1950 (Thursday) ==
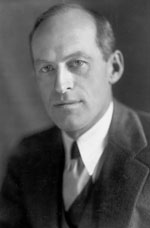
Senator Tydings

- The U.S. Senate voted 45–37 to accept a report by the Tydings Committee (chaired by U.S. Senator Millard Tydings). The report denounced accusations of Communist infiltration in the federal government, made by U.S. Senator Joseph McCarthy. The vote followed party lines, with all Democrats in favor, and all Republicans against. During the debate on the bill, Senator Tydings of Maryland said of McCarthy's charges, "What a farce this has been. What a hoax, what fraud, what deceit for a senator from Wisconsin to go to West Virginia and state there are 205 card-carrying Communists in the State Department... and then overnight to reduce the number to 57 and then come back to the Senate and make the same speech, paragraph by paragraph, with that one paragraph changed."
- The South Korean city of Taejon fell to the North Korean invasion, leaving the area south of the Naktong River as the only part of the peninsula not under Communist control.
- After a month-long campaign, the majority of North Korea's Air Force was destroyed by anti-communist forces.
- The Battle of Sangju began.
- Born: Bill Schroeder, one of four American college students killed in the Kent State shootings on May 4, 1970; in Cincinnati

== July 21, 1950 (Friday) ==
- The Battle of Taejon ended in tactical North Korean victory but a strategic U.S. victory as the 24th Infantry Division was able to delay the North Koreans long enough for other American divisions to establish a defensive perimeter around Pusan further south.
- The 24th U.S. Army Infantry, composed primarily of African-American soldiers, accomplished the first American victory in the Korean War, recapturing the Yecheon railway center from North Korean invaders.
- The University of California Board of Regents reversed it decision to fire 39 professors who had refused to sign a loyalty oath disavowing Communism. The vote was 10–9, with California Governor Earl Warren breaking the tie. Another 85 employees remained dismissed. One of the regents, John Francis Neylan, would change his vote, then move for a reconsideration in August, when the decision was reversed again, 12–10. One of the 39 people terminated was UCLA physics professor David S. Saxon, who would be reinstated in 1952 and later become the President of UC-Berkeley.
- Bolivia became the first of the United Nations' 52 members to offer troops to support the UN commitment to defend South Korea, sending 30 regular army officers to be commanded by U.S. General Douglas MacArthur.
- Died: Rex Ingram, 58, American film director

== July 22, 1950 (Saturday) ==
- Royal question: King Leopold III of Belgium returned home for the first time since surrendering the nation to Nazi German invaders ten years earlier. Arriving with Prime Minister Jean Duvieusart at the Haren military airport, Leopold addressed the nation by radio later in the day, while opposition members of Parliament demanded that he abdicate in favor of his son, Crown Prince Baudouin and a general strike was called, particularly in Wallonia. On August 11, Leopold would turn his powers over to Baudouin, and would abdicate on July 16, 1951.
- Communist China's Navy first began the shelling of the small island of Quemoy, under the control of the Nationalist Chinese.
- Died: William Lyon Mackenzie King, 75, three-time Prime Minister of Canada between 1921 and 1948

== July 23, 1950 (Sunday) ==
- The Government Administrative Council of the People's Republic of China, along with the Supreme People's Court, issued the "Directive on the Suppression of Counterrevolutionaries", to ferret out persons opposed to Communism.
- The Battle of Hwanggan began in the Korean War.
- The Gene Autry Show premiered on CBS television, and would run for six seasons, until August 7, 1956.
- The intentional sinking outside of The Narrows, St. John's of the S.S. Eagle, an old steamer, chartered 1944-1945 for the secret British Antarctic expedition, Operation Tabarin.

== July 24, 1950 (Monday) ==
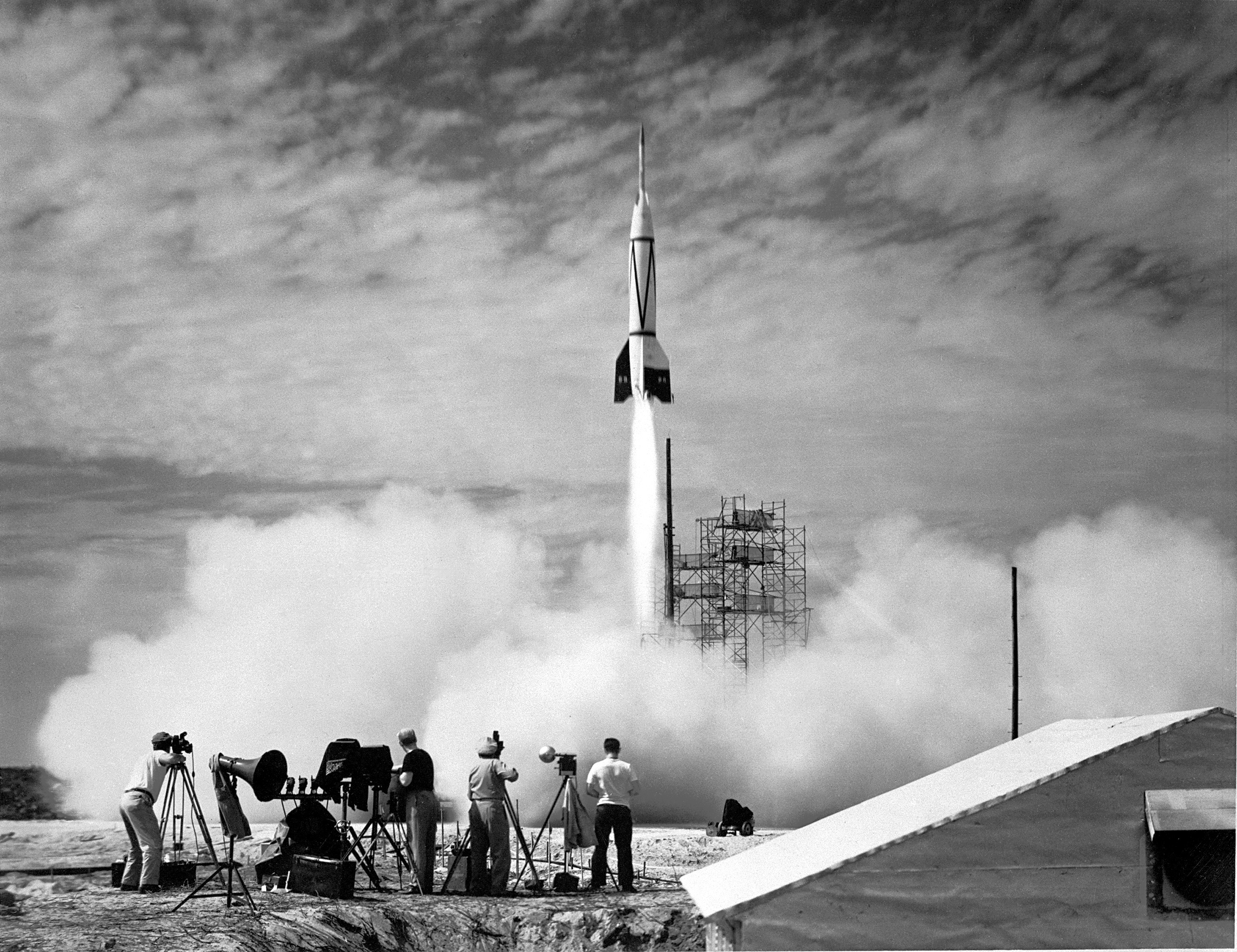
Launch from Cape Canaveral

- Cape Canaveral in Florida was used for the first time to launch a rocket. The U.S. Army sent the two-stage Bumper 8, which combined a German V-2 rocket and an American WAC Corporal rocket, to an altitude of 51,000 feet (16,000 m) in 83 seconds, then exploded it by remote control when it descended to 20,000 feet (6,100 m) 57 seconds later.
- Sadamichi Hirasawa was sentenced to death by a Japanese Court after being convicted of the murder of 12 people by using poison to rob a bank. On January 26, 1948, Hirazawa had walked into a bank in Tokyo, claimed to be a health officer, and ordered 16 people to drink "medicine" to combat an epidemic, then robbed the bank of 164,400 yen-- $456 at the time. Hirasawa would remain on death row for the rest of his life as appeals were filed, dying in Hachioji Prison, at the age of 95, on May 10, 1987.

== July 25, 1950 (Tuesday) ==
- At a meeting in Taegu, between U.S. Army and South Korean Army officials, a joint plan was made for dealing with the problem of South Korean refugees being infiltrated by North Korean soldiers. Six policies were implemented immediately, with the first one being "Leaflet drops will be made north of U.S. lines banning the people not to proceed south, that they risk being fired upon if they do so. If refugees do appear from north of U.S. lines they will receive warning shots, and if they then persist in advancing they will be shot." A secret letter, sent the next day from by John H. Muccio, the U.S. Ambassador to South Korea, to Assistant U.S. Secretary of State Dean Rusk described the policy. The policy would be carried out the next day at No Gun Ri. The existence of the letter would not become public until 2006, when historian Sahr Conway-Lanz discovered it in declassified documents in the National Archives.
- The Battle of Yongdong ended in North Korean victory after three days, although American artillery delayed North Korean forces for several crucial days.

== July 26, 1950 (Wednesday) ==
- The No Gun Ri Massacre was committed by American soldiers of the First Cavalry Division, of the U.S. Army's Seventh Cavalry Regiment, with the killing of as many as 300 South Korean civilians who had had the misfortune of encountering American forces the day after an order went out authorizing the shooting of refugees. On the first day, American airplanes strafed a group of children, women, and men who had been resting. When the survivors hid in a culvert, the U.S. soldiers killed them over the next two days. The rest of the world would not learn of the massacre for nearly fifty years. On September 30, 1999, Associated Press reporters Sang-hun Choe, Charles J. Hanley and Martha Mendoza would publish the results of their investigation.
- U.S. Senator Elmer Thomas of Oklahoma, who had represented the state for the last 28 years, and was Chairman of the Senate Agricultural Committee, was declared the loser of a runoff election between him and U.S. Representative Mike Monroney.
- Born: Susan George, English TV and film actress; in London
- Died: Guido Deiro, 63, Italian vaudeville performer and songwriter

== July 27, 1950 (Thursday) ==
- The Hadong Ambush occurred in the South Korean village of Hadong. North Korean forces successfully ambushed U.S. troops and inflicted heavy casualties.
- U.S. President Truman denied publicly that he was considering using the atomic bomb in Korea.
- Born: Simon Jones, British actor who portrayed Arthur Dent in the TV and radio adaptations of The Hitchhiker's Guide to the Galaxy; in Charlton Park, Wiltshire

== July 28, 1950 (Friday) ==
- Japan's Red Scare saw the firing of 180 newspaper employees suspected of being Japanese Communist Party members or sympathizers, while NHK, (the Japan Broadcasting Corporation) barred more than 100 of its employees from entering its facilities, on instructions of Major Edgar L. Tidwell, the radio officer of the United States Eighth Army.

== July 29, 1950 (Saturday) ==
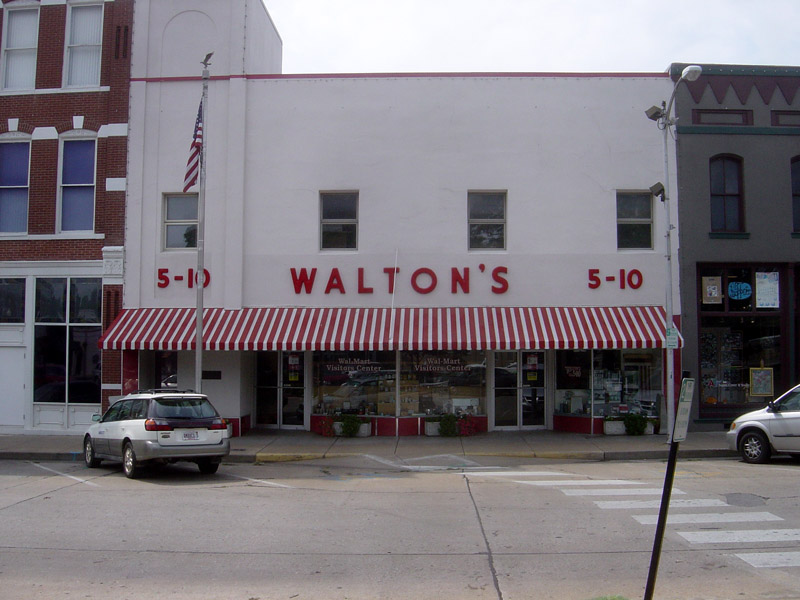
Walton's store before Wal-Mart

- In Bentonville, Arkansas, entrepreneur Sam Walton opened his first "self service" department store, "Walton's 5¢-10¢", after seeing the new concept in Minnesota, with customers picking their purchases off of open shelves rather than having them brought by a department clerk. From Bentonville, Walton would build a chain of 15 stores and then would create the Walmart chain on July 2, 1962. His company would have 1,960 stores at the time of his death in 1992, and more than 10,000 stores worldwide by 2013.
- The Battle of Hwanggan ended in North Korean victory.

== July 30, 1950 (Sunday) ==
- U.S. Secretary of Defense Louis A. Johnson persuaded President Truman to transfer ten nuclear-ready B-29 bombers from the Strategic Air Command task force to Guam, along with partially assembled atomic bombs that contained "everything but the fissionable cores".
- In Belgium, four workers striking over the "Royal Question" were shot dead by the Gendarmerie at Grâce-Berleur near Liège.
- Died: Guilhermina Suggia, 65, Portuguese cellist

== July 31, 1950 (Monday) ==
- A group of 80,000 protesters from Belgium's Hainaut province began marching toward the royal palace at Laeken, near Brussels to demand the abdication of King Leopold III, who had returned from exile only nine days earlier. Strikers from Haine-St.-Pierre (25,000), La Louviere (25,000) and Charleroi (30,000). Leopold announced later in the day that he would give up the throne to his son Prince Baudouin, in order to avert a civil war between the Dutch-speaking Flemings, who supported him, and the French-speaking Walloons who opposed him.
- The Indo-Nepal Treaty of Peace and Friendship was signed in Kathmandu by the last Rana Prime Minister of Nepal Mohan Shumsher Jang Bahadur Rana and Indian ambassador Chandeshwar Prasad Narayan Singh.
- The Battle of Sangju ended in North Korean victory.
- At 1:00 local time (1700 hours UTC), a Royal Canadian Air Force Lancaster 965 from 405 Squadron Greenwood crashed during the establishment of the Joint Arctic Weather Station (JAWS) at Alert, Northwest Territories (now in Nunavut) when the parachute for resupplies being airdropped became entangled on the tail of the aircraft. All 9 crew members were killed.
