= Alpha Beta Alpha =

American honorary library fraternity

- ΑΒΑ
- Founded: May 3, 1950; 76 years ago Northwestern State College of Louisiana
- Type: Professional
- Affiliation: Independent
- Status: Active
- Scope: National
- Motto: "Books, People, Service, Life"
- Colors: Royal Purple and White
- Symbol: Book and quill pen
- Flower: White rose
- Publication: The Alphabet
- Chapters: 2 active
- Headquarters: Natchitoches, Louisiana; United States
- Website: nsula.presence.io/organization/alpha-beta-alpha

Alpha Beta Alpha (ΑΒΑ) is an American honorary library fraternity that is dedicated to serving college and university library science majors at the undergraduate level, although membership privileges have been expanded in recent years to allow all undergraduate students who support their goals. The fraternity has two active chapters, after the reinstatement of its Alpha chapter at Northwestern State University in Natchitoches, Louisiana in 2018. Rho chapter, which for many years was the only active chapter, is situated at Kutztown University of Pennsylvania.

== History ==
Alpha Beta Alpha was founded at Northwestern State College, now known as Northwestern State University in Natchitoches, Louisiana on May 3, 1950. It was the first co-educational undergraduate library science fraternity to be established.

The idea of such an organization was first discussed at a banquet hosted by Eugene P. Watson at Northwestern State College on October 30, 1945. The event was attended by some forty library science students and librarians, along with Nora Buest of the U.S. Office of Education; Sue Hefley, Louisiana State Supervisor of School Libraries; and Mary Harris, Assistant State Librarian. Attendees spoke of the need for a nationwide professional development organization for library science students.

The following year, on January 10, 1946, the Northwestern State College Library Club was founded. Finally, on May 3, 1950, the members of the Scharlie E. Russel Library Club founded Alpha Beta Alpha, the first co-educational library science fraternity in the United States. The purpose of ABA is to support interest in librarianship, to maintain a sense of responsibility for the profession, and to develope a sympathy and understanding for the problems and work of people.

The charter members of Alpha Beta Alpha were:

- Helen Belisle
- Marguerite Bozeman
- Lucille Carnahan
- Agnes Clark
- Billie June Corry
- Randall Detro
- Mary Alice Driscoll
- Julia Duke
- Patsy Eason
- Bobbie Elkins
- Ruth Ann Ellender
- Yvonne Ewing
- Myrtle Freeze
- Sue Gilmore
- Maurine Gray
- May Hammett
- Sallie Harper
- Katherine Hopkins
- Audrey Jo King
- Dorothy Keyser
- Mrs. Johnnie Mallory
- Irene Pope
- Olive Roberts
- Freida Squyres
- Charles Thigpen
- Warren Tracy
- Tommie Jean Tullos
- Eugene Watson
- Mrs. Ora Williams
- Avis Jean Windham

Alpha Beta Alpha held its first national convention at Northwestern State College on March 15 and 16, 1952. Nearly fifty chapters were chartered at colleges across the United States.

The Alpha chapter is one of two active chapters of Alpha Beta Alpha and is located at Northwestern State University of Louisiana. This group hosts biweekly meetings to discuss and plan upcoming events, brainstorm service and informational events, nominate members of the week, and collaborate with Eugene P. Watson Memorial Library and other registered student organizations that promote reading & literacy. Past events have featured advocating against banning books & censorship, preserving oral histories and traditions centered around Louisiana culture, fun educational trivia, presentation of statistics, and speakers in fields that deal closely with books.

The Rho chapter is the second active chapter of Alpha Beta Alpha and is located at Kutztown University of Pennsylvania. The group holds weekly meetings where they plan and organize various service events on and off campus, discuss current events in the library science field, and bring in library and academic professionals to talk about library-related topics, and job opportunities around the United States. Recently, the organization has offered more social activities and events than just purely academic pursuits. Alpha Beta Alpha on the campus holds an annual banquet where they discuss the year's events as well as honoring special guests and graduating seniors.

Enrollment for chapters used to be strictly restricted to Library Science undergraduate majors but both of the current chapters have since opened up enrollment to all undergraduate students who are interested in reading and literary freedom

== Symbols ==
The Alpha Beta Alpha badge is in the shape of a closed book, behind which a quill pen is placed vertically; diagonally across the book are the letters Α, Β and Α. The pledge button is shaped like a shield and crossed by a diagonal line. The blazon of the official coat of arms is as follows:

- Arms: purpure [purple], on a bend argent [silver], three Greek letters ΑΒΑ, of the first between; in chief, a white rose-leaved vert; and in base, the reproduction of the ΑΒΑ key.
- Crest: on a wreath of the colors, a candle holder argent holding a candle purpure, flamed and resplendent, or [gold].
- The motto is Books, People, Service, Life.
- The fraternity colors are purple and white.
- The official flower is a white rose.
- The official seal is round with a reproduction of the badge in the center, the fraternity's name, and the date encircling the badge.

== Chapters ==
Following are the 37 chapters of Alpha Beta Alpha, with. active chapters noted in bold and inactive chapters in italics.

Chapter	Charter date and range	Institution	Location	Status	Ref.
**Alpha**	May 3, 1950 – 20xx ?; 2018–present	Northwestern State University	Natchitoches, Louisiana	Active	
Beta	December 2, 1950	Mississippi University for Women	Columbus, Mississippi	Inactive	
Gamma	February 3, 1952	Indiana State University	Terre Haute, Indiana	Inactive	
Delta	January 10, 1953	University of Alabama	Tuscaloosa, Alabama	Inactive	
Epsilon	January 17, 1953	Murray State University	Murray, Kentucky	Inactive	
Zeta	April 11, 1953	Concord University	Athens, West Virginia	Inactive	
Eta	May 6, 1953	Texas Woman's University	Denton, Texas	Inactive	
Theta	May 23, 1953 – 1970	Arizona State University	Tempe, Arizona	Inactive	
Iota	1953–1968	San Jose State University	San Jose, California	Inactive	
Kappa	April 12, 1954 – 1972	Millersville University of Pennsylvania	Millersville, Pennsylvania	Inactive	
Lambda	April 14, 1954	Louisiana State University	Baton Rouge, Louisiana	Inactive	
Mu	February 25, 1956	Illinois State University	Normal, Illinois	Inactive	
Nu	April 15, 1956 – 1975	Marshall University	Huntington, West Virginia	Inactive	
Xi	May 26, 1956 – 1971	University of Northern Iowa	Cedar Falls, Iowa	Inactive	
Omicron	April 5, 1957	Florida A&M University	Tallahassee, Florida	Inactive	
Pi	April 13, 1957 – 1967	Our Lady of the Lake University	San Antonio, Texas	Inactive	
**Rho**	November 20, 1957	Kutztown University of Pennsylvania	Kutztown, Pennsylvania	Active	
Sigma	March 22, 1958 – 1971	Western Michigan University	Kalamazoo, Michigan	Inactive	
Tau	1958–May 1964	Northern Illinois University	DeKalb, Illinois	Inactive	
Upsilon	November 1, 1958	Shepherd University	Shepherdstown, West Virginia	Inactive	
Phi	January 16, 1960 – 1970	Central Michigan University	Mount Pleasant, Michigan	Inactive	
Chi	March 31, 1960 – 1973	University of North Texas	Denton, Texas	Inactive	
Psi	May 22, 1960	Southeast Missouri State University	Cape Girardeau, Missouri	Inactive	
Omega	November 17, 1960 – 1968	University of Tennessee	Knoxville, Tennessee	Inactive	
Alpha Alpha	April 8, 1961	James Madison University	Harrisonburg, Virginia	Inactive	
Alpha Beta	April 14, 1961	Nicholls State University	Thibodaux, Louisiana	Inactive	
Alpha Gamma	November 10, 1962	Morehead State University	Morehead, Kentucky	Inactive	
Alpha Delta	October 17, 1963	Oklahoma State University–Stillwater	Stillwater, Oklahoma	Inactive	
Alpha Epsilon	November 20, 1963	University of North Alabama	Florence, Alabama	Inactive	
Alpha Zeta	May 14, 1965	Shippensburg University of Pennsylvania	Shippensburg, Pennsylvania	Inactive	
Alpha Eta	April 29, 1967	East Carolina University	Greenville, North Carolina	Inactive	
Alpha Theta	1966	Louisiana Tech University	Ruston, Louisiana	Inactive	
Alpha Iota	1968	Rowan University	Glassboro, New Jersey	Inactive	
Alpha Kappa	1968	University of Central Oklahoma	Edmond, Oklahoma	Inactive	
Alpha Lambda	1969	Edinboro University of Pennsylvania	Edinboro, Pennsylvania	Inactive	
Alpha Mu	1969	Northwest Missouri State University	Maryville, Missouri	Inactive	
Alpha Nu	1969	Radford University	Radford, Virginia	Inactive	
Alpha Xi	1969	Eastern Illinois University	Charleston, Illinois	Inactive	
Alpha Omicron	1969	West Virginia Wesleyan College	Buckhannon, West Virginia	Inactive	
Alpha Pi	1970	Mansfield University of Pennsylvania	Mansfield, Pennsylvania	Inactive	
Alpha Rho	1970	Austin Peay State University	Clarksville, Tennessee	Inactive	
Alpha Sigma	1970	Sam Houston State University	Huntsville, Texas	Inactive	
Alpha Tau	1970	Slippery Rock University of Pennsylvania	Slippery Rock, Pennsylvania	Inactive	
Alpha Upsilon	1970	University of Central Arkansas	Conway, Arkansas	Inactive	
Alpha Phi	1970	Jackson State University	Jackson, Mississippi	Inactive	
Alpha Chi	1972	University of Wisconsin–Whitewater	Whitewater, Wisconsin	Inactive	
Alpha Psi	1972	Western Illinois University	Macomb, Illinois	Inactive	
Alpha Omega	October 28, 1973	South Carolina State University	Orangeburg, South Carolina	Inactive	

== See also ==
- Honor society
- Professional fraternities and sororities
