= List of Chasseurs Alpins =

Notable persons that have served in the Chasseurs Alpins.

== Officers ==
- Jacques Faure
- Maurice Gamelin
- Yves Godard
- André Lalande
- Nicolas Le Nen
- Émile Paganon
- Philippe Pétain
- Marcel Pourchier
- Bernard Saint-Hillier
- Jean Vallette d'Osia

== Enlisted ==
- Caroline Aigle
- Pierre Balmain
- Ulysse Bozonnet
- Marie Marvingt
- Gilbert Morand
- George Rodocanachi
- Pierre Schoendoerffer
- Léon Weil
