= Robert Zurbriggen =

Swiss cross-country skier and biathlete

Personal information
- Born: 16 March 1917 Saas-Fee, Switzerland
- Died: 21 April 1952 (aged 35)

Sport
- Sport: Skiing

Robert Zurbriggen (16 March 1917 – 21 April 1952) was a Swiss cross-country skier and biathlete who competed in the 1948 Winter Olympics.

Zurbriggen was born in Saas-Fee. In 1948 he was leader of the Swiss relay team which finished fifth in the 4x10 km relay competition. At this time he had the military rank of an Oberleutnant. In the 18 km event he finished 26th.

He also participated in the demonstration event, military patrol (precursor to biathlon). He was leader of the Swiss team, which finished first in the military patrol event (R. Zurbriggen, his brother H. Zurbriggen, Andenmatten, Vouardoux). In 1949 he, Karl Hischier, Karl Bricker and Andenmatten also won the revenge race in Oslo.

As a mountain guide of a glacier tour, he had a fatal accident in 1952.
