= August 1950 =

Month of 1950

<<	August 1950					>>
Su	Mo	Tu	We	Th	Fr	Sa
		1	2	3	4	5
6	7	8	9	10	11	12
13	14	15	16	17	18	19
20	21	22	23	24	25	26
27	28	29	30	31

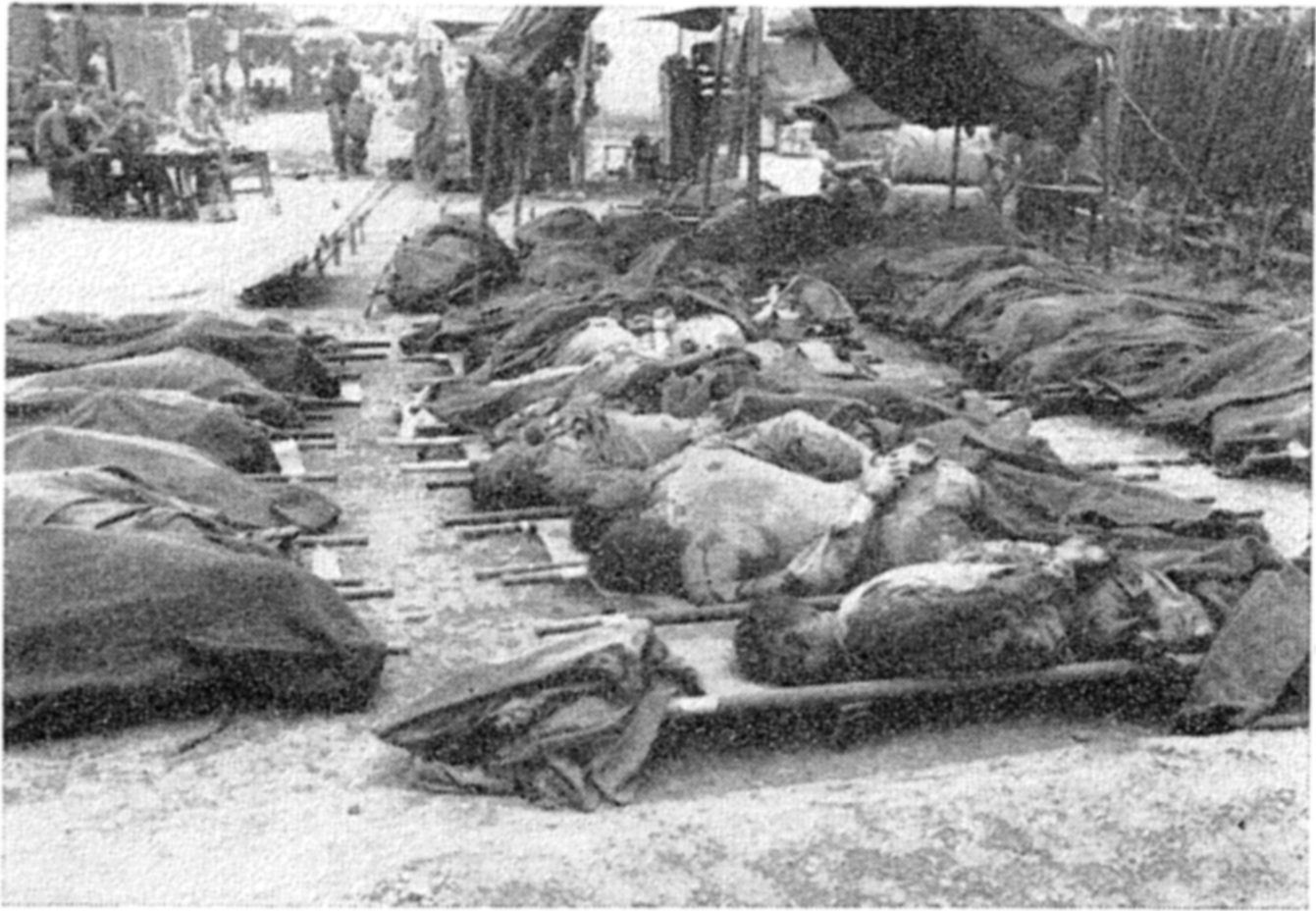
August 17, 1950: 39 American POWs executed by North Korea

August 17, 1950: Indonesia parts with Netherlands

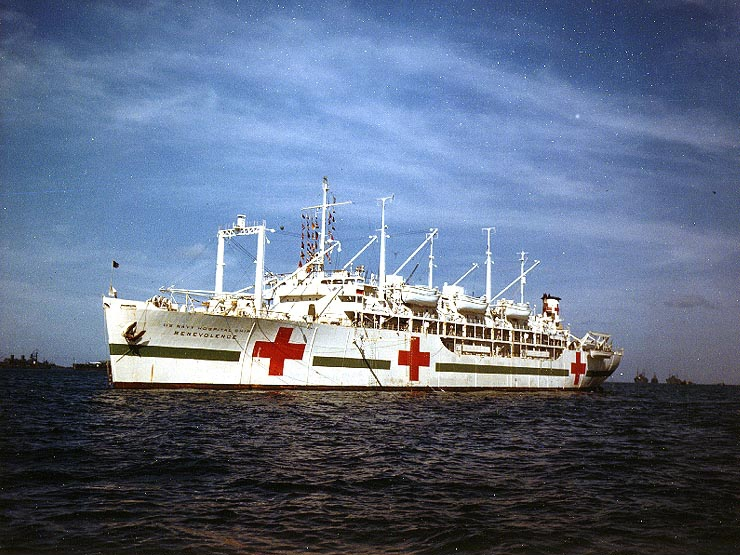
USS Benevolence sinks, 492 of 523 saved

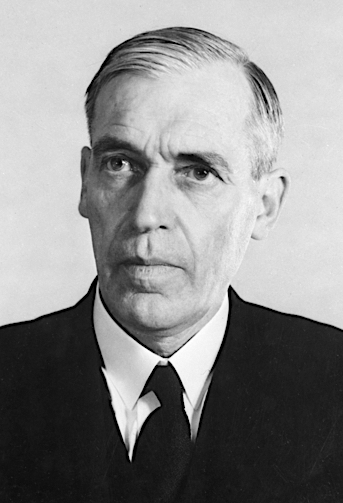
August 22, 1950: Owen Dixon quits before solving the Kashmir Dispute

The following events occurred in August 1950:

== August 1, 1950 (Tuesday) ==
- The Soviet Union returned to the United Nations Security Council after having refused to send a delegate since January. During the Soviet absence, the Security Council had authorized the United Nations to enter the Korean War, a move that the Soviets could have vetoed.
- The 60,000 inhabitants of Guam became United States citizens with limited self-government, as a United States Territory under the oversight of the U.S. Department of the Interior. The Pacific Ocean island had been administered by the U.S. Department of Defense after the Navy Department had controlled it as a naval base.
- The royal question in Belgium was resolved as King Leopold III publicly announced that he would abdicate in favor of his son, Baudouin.
- Born:
  - Roy Williams, American basketball coach who guided the University of North Carolina to two NCAA championships (2005 and 2009); in Marion, North Carolina
  - Bunkhouse Buck (a/k/a Jack Swagger, Sr.), American professional wrestler, as James Golden in Bucksnort, Tennessee

== August 2, 1950 (Wednesday) ==
- The Battle of the Notch was fought between U.S. and North Korean forces, resulting in a victory for the United States when the North Korean attack was repelled with heavy casualties.
- The Helms Athletic Foundation announced that it was creating a "professional football hall of fame" in Los Angeles and announced the names of 25 persons whose photographs would be posted at Helms Hall. The persons, selected by seven Los Angeles sports editors, had their names engraved on a trophy. In 1963, the Pro Football Hall of Fame (unrelated to the Helms Hall) would be founded; of the 25 Helms' choices, 12 would be in the first group, while Bill Hewitt, Ray Flaherty and Tuffy Leemans would not be enshrined until the 1970s.
- Born: Lance Ito, American judge best known for presiding over the 1995 murder trial of O. J. Simpson; in Los Angeles
- Died: Macario Pineda, 38, Filipino novelist and short story author

== August 3, 1950 (Thursday) ==
- Thirty-five men from the U.S. Army arrived in Saigon as part of the American Military Assistance Advisory Group. Sent to assist the French government in the training of the new Army of the Republic of Vietnam, the group began a nearly 25 year American involvement in South Vietnam.
- The UN Security Council voted 8–1 against a new Soviet proposal to admit the People's Republic of China to the United Nations.
- Born:
  - Jo Marie Payton, American television actress (Family Matters), in Albany, Georgia
  - Linda Howard, American romance novelist, as Linda Howington in Gadsden, Alabama

== August 4, 1950 (Friday) ==
- At a meeting of the Politburo of the Chinese Communist Party, Chairman Mao Zedong called on the Party to prepare for the People's Liberation Army to enter the Korean War. According to minutes from the meeting, Mao told the Politburo that "If the U.S. imperialists win the war, they would become more arrogant and threaten us... we have to prepare for this."

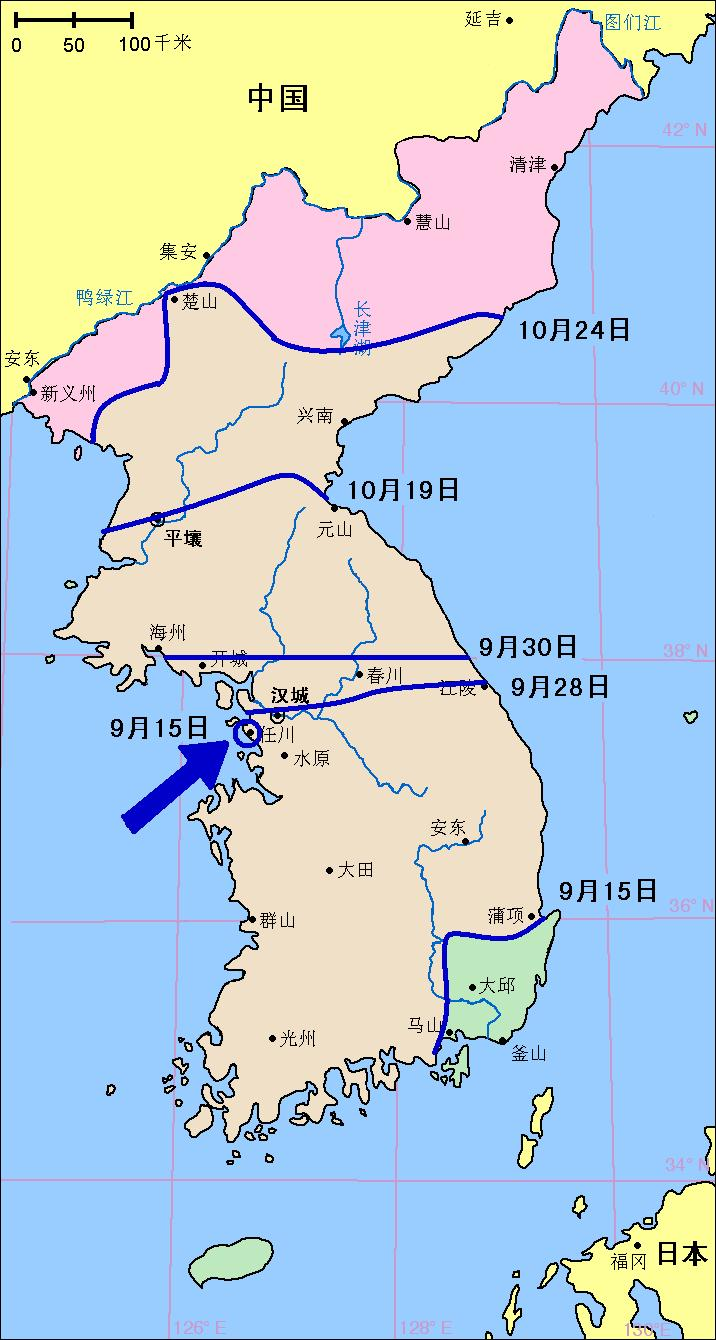
Pusan perimeter (in green)

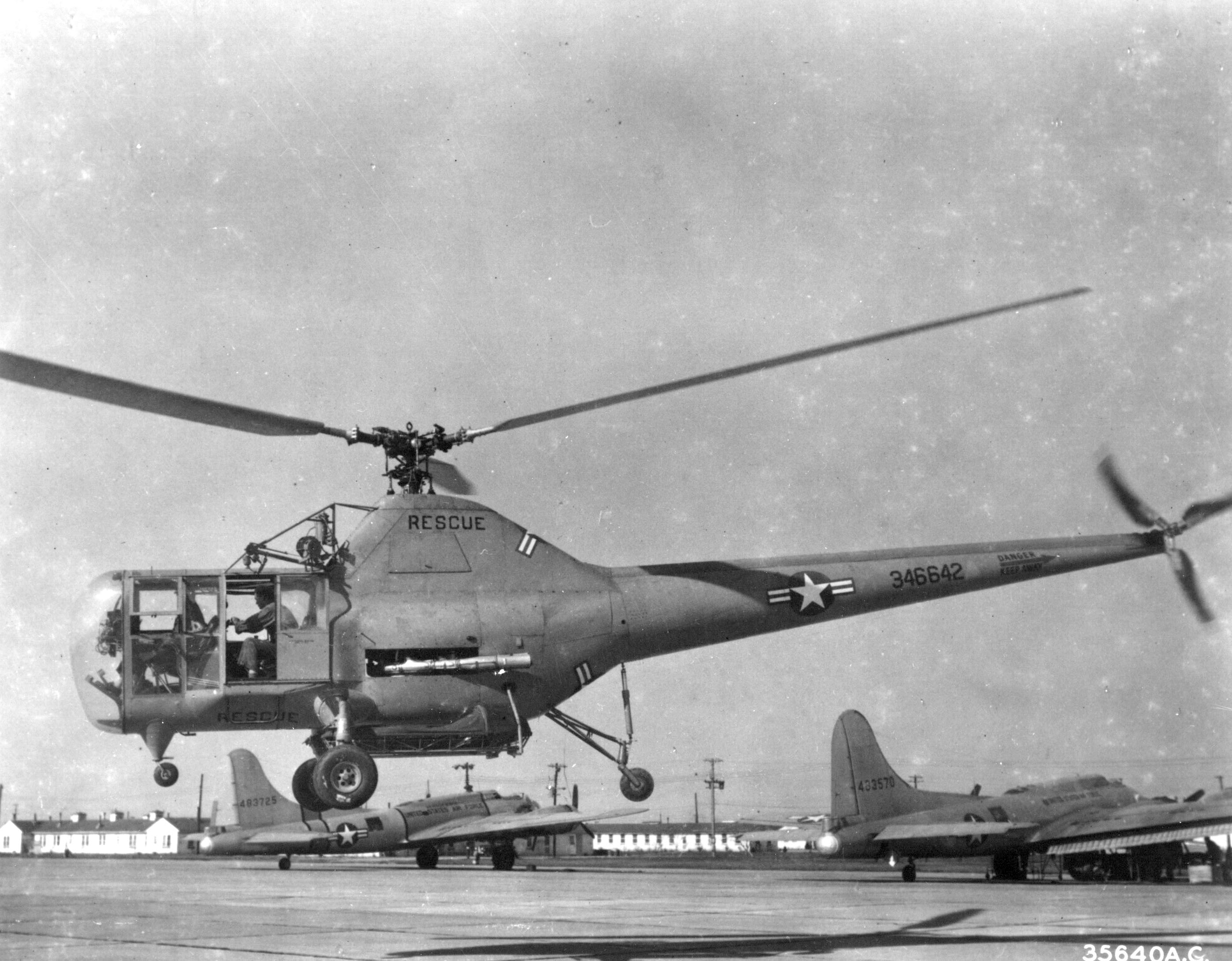
A Sikorsky H-5

- The Pusan Perimeter, 140 miles in length in southeastern Korea, was established as the line of defense for United Nations forces by Lt. General Walton H. Walker of the U.S. Eighth Army.
- The first medical evacuation flight in the Korean War was made by a U.S. Marines Sikorsky H-5 helicopter, which transported two unidentified wounded soldiers from a battlefield to a military evacuation hospital. There would be 9,815 MEDEVAC flights that saved the lives of wounded men transported during the war.
- The U.S. State Department canceled the passport of African-American singer and activist Paul Robeson, after he refused to sign an oath that he was not affiliated with any Communist organizations.
- Counterattack magazine, which purported to identify Communist Party members and sympathizers in the motion picture and television industries, reported that actors Marlon Brando and Burt Lancaster, and director Elia Kazan, were all persons who had a "Communist front record".
- Radio Free Europe began broadcasting to Poland and to Hungary, after having started on July 4 with transmissions to Czechoslovakia. Bulgaria was added for transmissions on August 11.
- The film noir Kiss Tomorrow Goodbye starring James Cagney and Barbara Payton premiered in New York City.
- Born: Caldwell Jones, basketball player, in McGehee, Arkansas (d. 2014)

== August 5, 1950 (Saturday) ==
- The battles of Masan, Naktong Bulge, P'ohang-dong and Taegu all began as part of the larger Battle of Pusan Perimeter.
- Chinese General Gao Gang was assigned the task of preparing the Northeast Border Defense Force for an intervention in Korea within a month. On August 15, Gao sought and received a postponement, but was ordered to be ready no later than September 30.
- A bomb-laden B-29 Superfortress crashed into a residential area near the Fairfield-Suisun Air Base in California, killing 17 people and injuring 68. Brigadier General Robert T. Travis was one of the fatalities, and the base would be renamed in his honor as Travis Air Force Base.

== August 6, 1950 (Sunday) ==
- General Ye Jianying and General Peng Dehuai were able to dissuade China's Mao Zedong from his belief that China could prepare its army for an invasion of Korea within only three weeks. Mao was wanting an immediate invasion because the U.S., UN and South Korean forces were pinned down within the small Pusan Perimeter, while Yu and Peng believed that a minimum of four months would be necessary. Ultimately, the Chinese intervention would take place in a little less than four months.

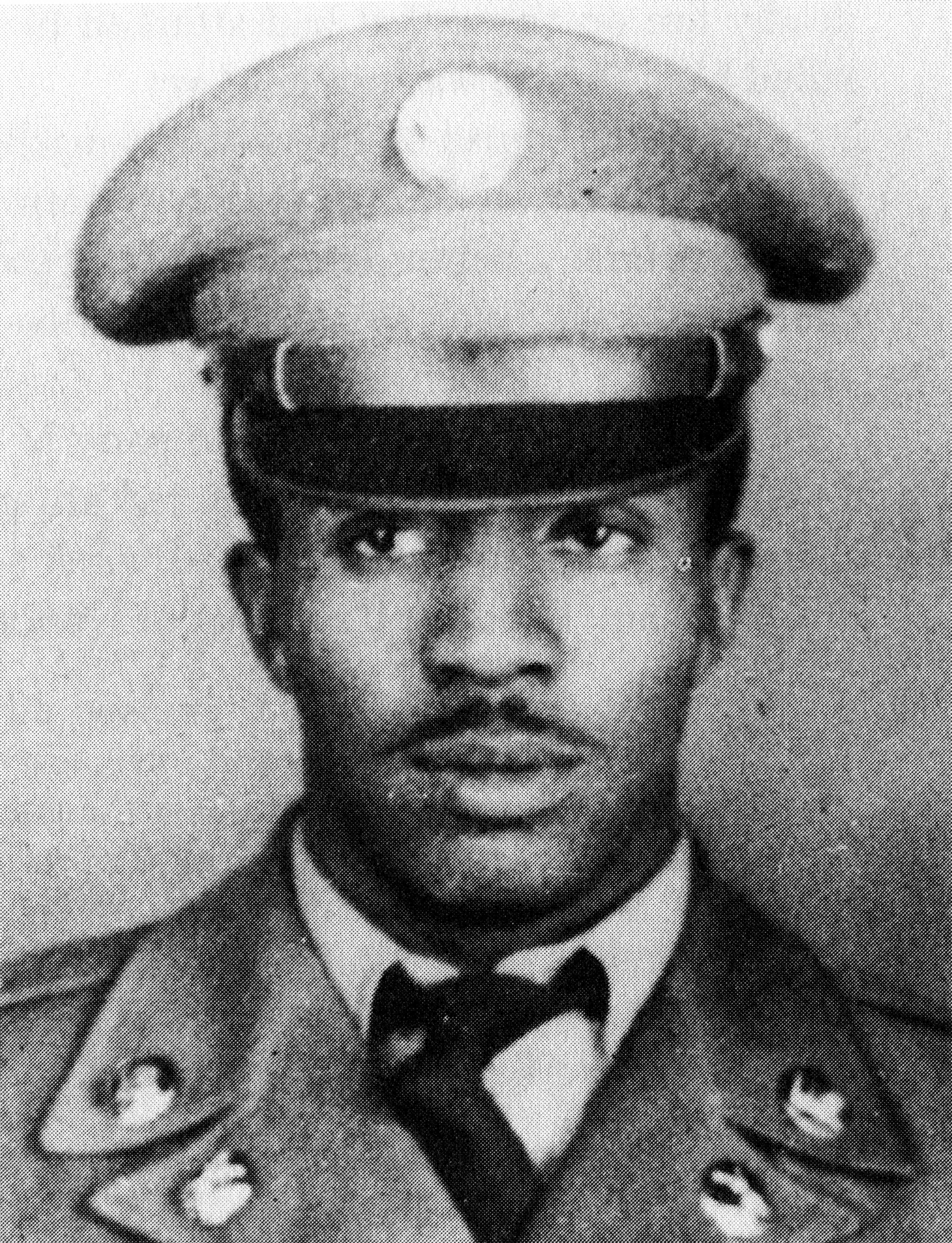
Thompson

- Born: Winston E. Scott, American astronaut, in Miami
- Died: William Henry Thompson, 22, African-American U.S. Army private, who would become the first person to be awarded the Medal of Honor in the Korean War. At Masan, Thompson stayed at his machine gun so that his fellow soldiers from the 24th Infantry Regiment could escape an overwhelming North Korean attack.

== August 7, 1950 (Monday) ==
Canada's Korean War unit

- The Canadian Army Special Force was created by combining units of Princess Patricia's Canadian Light Infantry and Lord Strathcona's Horse (Royal Canadians) to serve in the Korean War.
- Laureano Gómez was inaugurated as the 24th President of Colombia after winning an election boycotted by the rival Liberal Party; he would be ousted in a military coup on June 13, 1953.
- Born:
  - Rodney Crowell, American country music singer and songwriter, in Houston
  - Alan Keyes, former U.S. State Department official and who ran as the Republican candidate for U.S. Senator for Maryland (1988 and 1992) and U.S. Senator for Illinois against Barack Obama in 2004, as well as a third party candidate for U.S. President in 2008 for America's Independent Party

== August 8, 1950 (Tuesday) ==
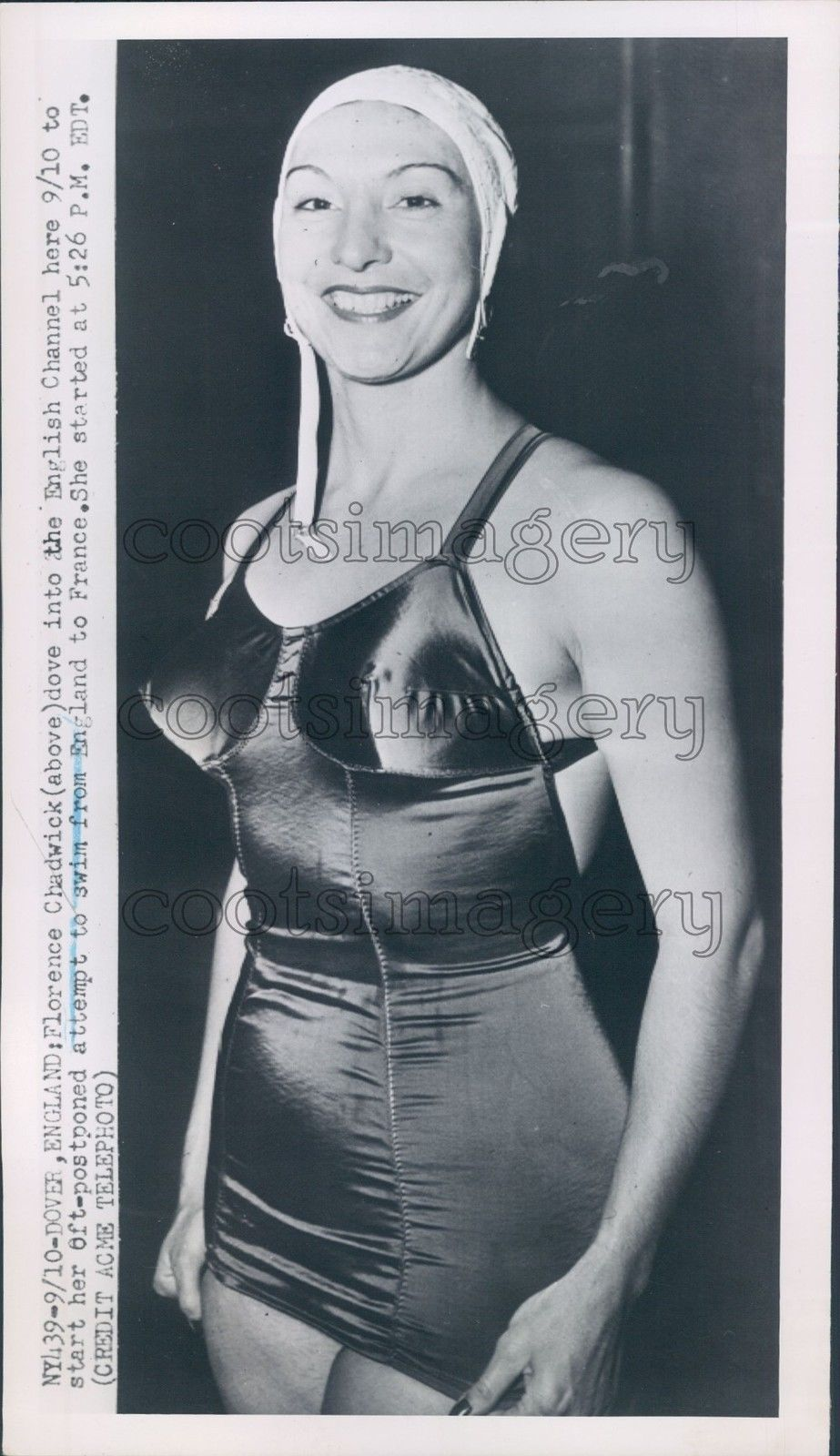
Chadwick

- Florence Chadwick of the United States swam across the English Channel in 13 hours, 22 minutes, breaking the women's record set by Gertrude Ederle on August 6, 1926. Chadwick arrived on the shores of Dover at 3:59 p.m. local time, and became only the third woman to cross the Channel, after Ederle and Millie Gade Corson (who made the crossing on August 28, 1926.
- Born:
  - Ken Kutaragi, Japanese business executive, Chairman and CEO of Sony Computer Entertainment, known as "The Father of the PlayStation"; in Tokyo
  - Sayyed Imam Al-Sharif, Egyptian-born al-Qaeda leader, in Beni Suef
  - Mutulu Shakur, American bank robber, as Jeral Wayne Williams in Baltimore (d. 2023)
- Died: Nikolai Myaskovsky, 69, Russian Soviet composer known as "The Father of the Soviet Symphony"

== August 9, 1950 (Wednesday) ==
- Soviet Premier Joseph Stalin ordered the development and deployment of the S-25 Berkut anti-aircraft missile system, to be done within one year, to defend Moscow against the possibility of an attack by American B-29 bombers. When finished, the Berkut system would have "56 missile regiments in two concentric rings around Moscow".
- Died: Philipp Schmitt, 47, German SS Sturmbannfuhrer who oversaw the deportation to Germany of prisoners in Belgium at the Fort Breendonk concentration camp, near Antwerp. Schmitt was shot by a firing squad and became the last person to be executed in Belgium.

== August 10, 1950 (Thursday) ==
- One month after General Douglas MacArthur authorized partial Japanese rearmament on July 8, 1950, the National Police Reserve (Keisatsu Yobitai) was formally created.
- The film noir Sunset Boulevard starring William Holden and Gloria Swanson was released.

== August 11, 1950 (Friday) ==
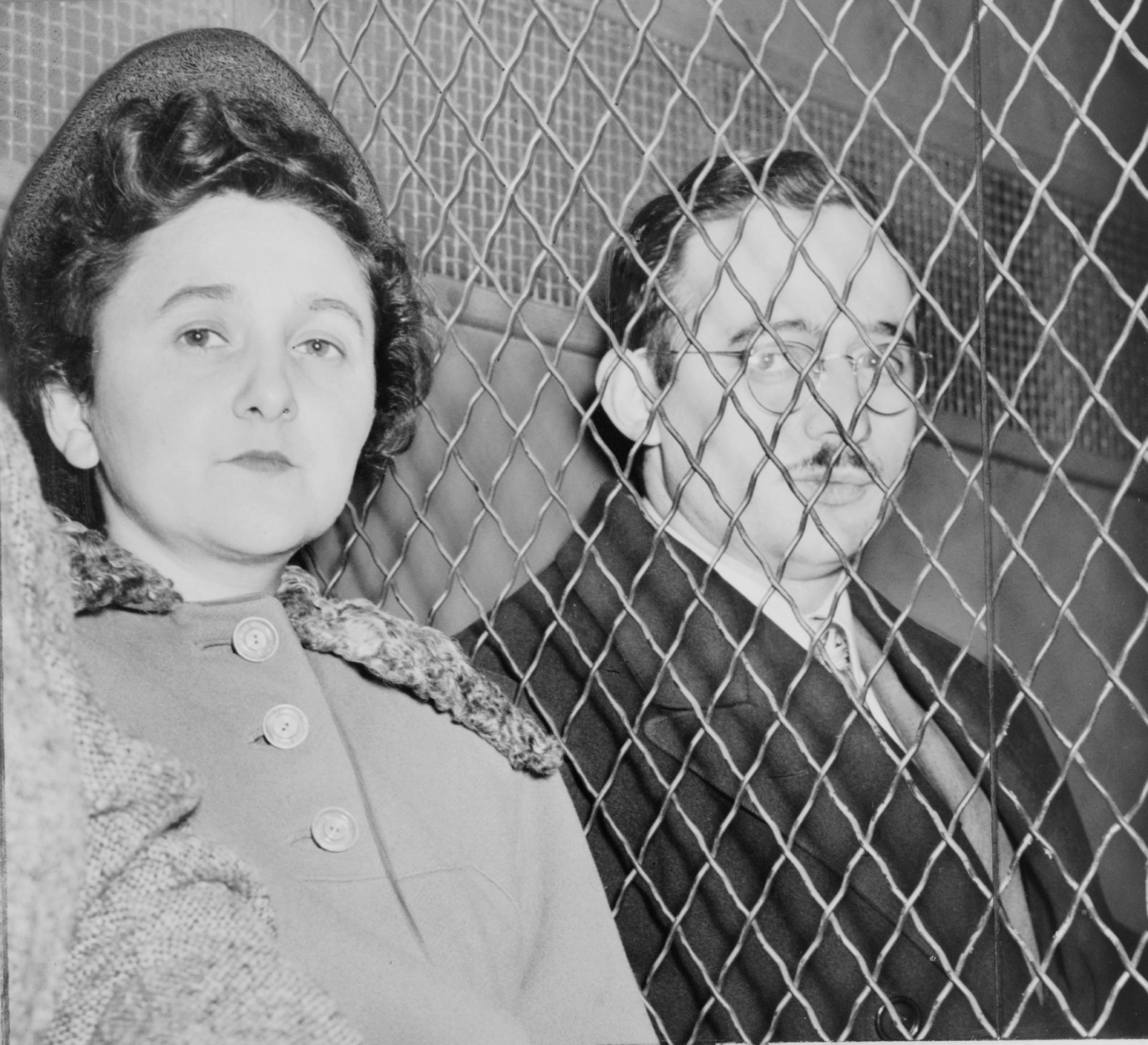
Ethel Rosenberg and husband Julius Rosenberg

- Crown Prince Baudouin of Belgium was administered the oath to become Prince Royal, exercising all of the powers of his father, Leopold III, who retained the title of King of Belgium. Earlier the Belgian Senate and the Chamber of Deputies approved Leopold's decision to relinquish power, 349–0 with eight abstentions. Leopold would formally abdicate on July 16, 1951.
- The Consultative Assembly of the new Council of Europe voted 89–5 in favor of a proposal by Winston Churchill for an eleven-nation United European Army that would be allied with Canada and the United States. The non-binding resolution would eventually be realized to some extent with the creation of the North Atlantic Treaty Organization (NATO).
- Ethel Rosenberg was arrested in New York City, 25 days after her husband Julius Rosenberg had been arrested and charged with espionage. Ethel's brother, David Greenglass, had implicated her as a co-conspirator with Julius in passing on atomic secrets to the Soviet Union.
- Born:
  - Steve Wozniak, American computer scientist and co-founder of Apple Computer, in San Jose, California
  - Gennadiy Nikonov, Soviet Russian weapon designer who created the AN-94 assault rifle; in Ustinov (now Izhevsk), USSR (d. 2003)
  - Erik Brann, American rock guitarist for Iron Butterfly; in Pekin, Illinois (d. 2003)

== August 12, 1950 (Saturday) ==
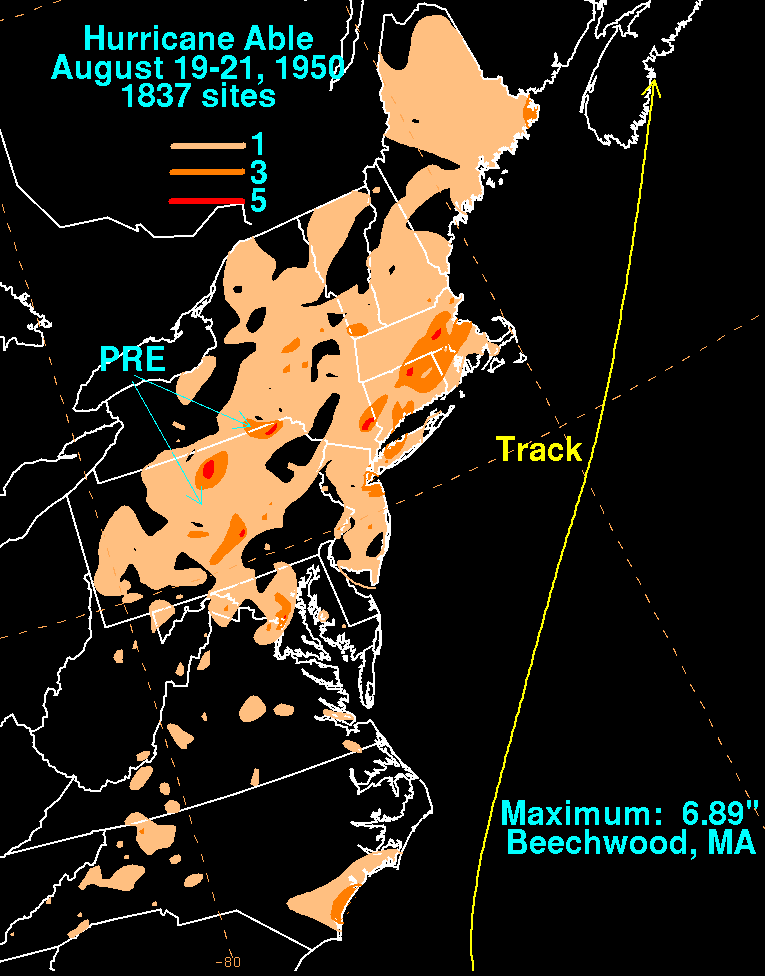
Able, the first hurricane with a name

- Hurricane Able was announced by meteorologist Grady Norton of the U.S. Weather Bureau, the first under its new system of naming hurricanes. It produced 140 mile per hour winds but did not make landfall. Prior to 1950, hurricane-force storms were identified by number, with "1949 Storm 11" closing the previous season.
- The U.S. Atomic Energy Commission issued its first book on safety in the event of a nuclear war, entitled The Effects of Atomic Weapons. Editor Joseph O. Hirschfelder wrote in the introduction that "Just as our ancestors learned to face the perils of cholera and smallpox epidemics, so must modern man learn to live with the man-made danger of atomic bomb attack." Advice included "duck and cover", advising that within one second after the flash of a bomb one should "fall flat and double up".
- The Battle of the Bowling Alley began in a narrow valley north of Taegu.
- Pope Pius XII issued the encyclical Humani generis.
- Born:
  - August Darnell (Thomas August Darnell Browder), American musician and leader of the band Kid Creole and the Coconuts; in New York City;
  - George McGinnis, basketball player, in Indianapolis, Indiana (d. 2023)

== August 13, 1950 (Sunday) ==
- Overloaded, the Soviet steamer Mayakovsky sank in the Daugava River that bisects Riga, the capital of Latvian SSR (at the time, a part of the Soviet Union). There were 147 victims, 48 of whom were children. The disaster, which happened during the rule of Joseph Stalin, was not reported in the Soviet press. On August 19, 2011, a memorial plaque would finally be placed on the Stone Bridge in Riga to honor the people who drowned on the pleasure trip.
- The English-language propaganda broadcasts of "Seoul City Sue", on the air since June 28, ended after a U.S. airstrike on the North Korean controlled radio broadcast facilities in Seoul. "Sue" was an American, Anna Wallace Suhr of Oklahoma, who had pledged allegiance to the North Korean cause after the invasion of Seoul. After the broadcast tower was repaired, she did not return to the air.

== August 14, 1950 (Monday) ==
- The London Festival Ballet (later the English National Ballet) held its inaugural performance, with a production at Southsea.
- Born: Gary Larson, American cartoonist who wrote the newspaper comic The Far Side from 1980 to 1995; in Tacoma, Washington

== August 15, 1950 (Tuesday) ==
- An 8.6 magnitude earthquake killed 780 people in India. At 7:39 pm Indian Standard Time, the city of Dibrugarh was destroyed by the first shock, which the USGS reported to be the fifth largest earthquake "ever to show up on the world's seismographs". Landslides from the Abor Hills dammed the Subansiri River, and when dam broke eight days later, 23 foot high waves swept through area villages and killed another 536 people, and subsequent flooding in the Assam State of India. In addition to the deaths, five million people were left homeless.
- The Battle of Battle Mountain began around the Seobuksan mountain area in South Korea.
- Born:
  - Anne Elizabeth Alice Louise, British princess, in Westminster; At the time of her birth to Princess Elizabeth (later Queen Elizabeth II), Princess Anne was third in line for the throne; after the death of her grandfather, King George VI, Anne would be second in line until the birth of her brother, Andrew in 1960. Her name was not announced until two weeks after her birth.;
  - Neil J. Gunther, Australian computer scientist, in Preston, Victoria
  - Tom Kelly, American baseball manager who guided the Minnesota Twins to two World Series championships (1987 and 1991), in Graceville, Minnesota
  - Billy Griffin, American singer and songwriter, in Baltimore
  - Andres Serrano, controversial American photographer, in New York City

== August 16, 1950 (Wednesday) ==
- Morton Sobell, an American research scientist and friend of Julius and Ethel Rosenberg, was arrested in Mexico City, where he had fled with his wife and children on June 22, 1950. Mexican security police drove Sobel to Nuevo Laredo, then escorted him across the border to Laredo, Texas, where he was turned over to the FBI. Tried along with the Rosenbergs, Sobell would escape the death sentence that they had received, but would be sentenced to 30 years in federal prison; he would be paroled in 1969 after 18 years incarceration.

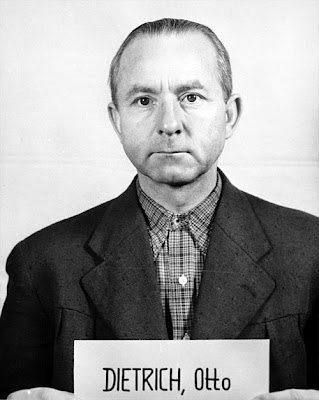
Dr. Dietrich

- Dr. Otto Dietrich, who had served as the Nazi Party's Reich Press Secretary and was "Hitler's chief publicity agent", was released from Landsberg Prison after serving five years of his seven-year war crimes prison sentence. Dietrich would live two more years, dying on November 22, 1952.
- Joseph Pholien became Prime Minister of Belgium.
- Born: Hasely Crawford, Trinidadian Olympic athlete, 1976 gold medalist for 100 meter dash; in San Fernando

== August 17, 1950 (Thursday) ==
President Sukarno

- The Republic of Indonesia was proclaimed by Autonomous Republican President Sukarno, who dissolved the existing federation, and the Autonomous Republic within the Netherlands, in favor of a centrally ruled republic. The date marked the fifth anniversary of August 17, 1945, beginning of the Indonesian National Revolution, when Sukarno and Mohammad Hatta had declared the nation's islands independent.
- In what would later be called the "Hill 303 massacre", 39 captured American soldiers were executed after being taken as prisoners of war by North Korea. Kim Qwong Toaek, the North Korean officer who had ordered the killing of the captives, was himself taken prisoner during a counterattack by U.S. soldiers, and identified by three survivors of the battle for control of the hill north of Waegwan, identified as #303 by military planners.

== August 18, 1950 (Friday) ==
- The city of Taegu, which had become the temporary capital of South Korea after the fall of Seoul, was evacuated by its 500,000 civilians as troops from North Korea overran the town of Kumwha, 12 miles away. Eight weeks after the Korean War began on June 25, 80% of South Korea had been conquered by the invaders, with the exception of the southeastern portion of the peninsula inside the Pusan Perimeter.
- The ballet The Witch, performed by the New York City Ballet company, premiered at London's Covent Garden. When it completed its British run, plans for bringing it to the United States were scuttled because "customs officials destroyed the expensive sets and costumes".
- Fred Snyder, working on his doctoral thesis at Wichita State University Ph.D candidate, completed his experiment in visual perception, after 30 days of having worn "inverted prisms", a set of special glasses, which turned his view upside down. After a few days, he found that his brain was able to adapt to the view, to the point that he was able to drive a car and watch movies. Snyder would later publish his findings in the 1952 book Vision with Spatial Inversion.
- Belgian Communist anti-monarchist Julien Lahaut was assassinated in Seraing; no-one was brought to justice for the crime.

== August 19, 1950 (Saturday) ==
- The American cultural tradition, of Saturday morning television being set aside for children's programming, began with the premiere on the ABC network of two live shows, Animal Clinic and Acrobat Ranch.
- The spouse and children, of any alien member of the U.S. armed forces, became eligible for immigration to the United States under a law passed by Congress. The new law provided for admission of eligible dependents, regardless of existing national quotas, race or ethnic origin, provided that the marriage took place before March 19, 1952.
- The First Battle of Naktong Bulge was won by U.S. and United Nations command forces after 14 days, and marked a defeat for the North Korean invaders, who no longer outnumbered the defending forces.
- "Goodnight, Irene" by Gordon Jenkins and The Weavers topped the Billboard Best Sellers in Stores chart for the first of thirteen consecutive weeks.
- "I'm Movin' On" by Canadian country music artist Hank Snow began the first of a 21-week stay atop the Billboard country music charts, the record coming via the "Most Played by Disc Jockeys" listing. The song's eventual run would match a 3-year-old record held by Eddy Arnold's "I'll Hold You in My Heart (Till I Can Hold You in My Arms)," and would be tied 4 1/2 years later by Webb Pierce's "In the Jailhouse Now." The records would hold until 2013, when "Cruise" by Florida Georgia Line would surpass the record with a 24-week stay at No. 1.
- Born:
  - Sudha Murthy, Indian computer scientist and philanthropist, in Shiggaon, Bombay State (now Karnataka)
  - Jennie Bond, British journalist and television presenter, in Hitchin, Hertfordshire
- Died: Black Elk (Hehaka Sapa, also known as Nicholas Black Elk, Sr.), 87, Lakota Indian holy man

== August 20, 1950 (Sunday) ==
- The battles of P'ohang-dong and Taegu ended in United Nations victory.
- Professor Sayyid Qutb, who would lead the Islamic activist group Muslim Brotherhood, ended his two-year residence in the United States and returned to his native Egypt, where he developed his philosophy of radical Islam.
- The "Security Suspension Act" was passed by the U.S. Congress, providing for immediate suspension from federal government work for anyone who violated security rules.

== August 21, 1950 (Monday) ==
- Voters in Puerto Rico elected representatives for a convention to draft the first constitution for the U.S. possession, which had been granted limited self-government on July 3.
- Born: Arthur Bremer, American janitor, in Milwaukee. On May 15, 1972, Bremer shot and crippled George C. Wallace, who was running for the Democratic Party nomination for U.S. President. Bremer spent 35 years in prison, and was released on November 9, 2007

== August 22, 1950 (Tuesday) ==
- Abd El Rehim of Egypt broke a 24-year-old record for fastest time crossing the English Channel, finishing in 10 hours and 53 minutes. A swimmer from France also broke the world's record of 11:05 held by Georges Michel since 1926, but was ten minutes behind Rehim. Five other men and two women also made the crossing that day, for the largest group of people to ever swim across the Channel. The nine were competing in a contest sponsored by the London Daily Mail. "
- Althea Gibson became the first African-American person to qualify for one of the four Grand Slam tennis tournaments, when she was one of the 52 women selected to play in the US Open. On August 28, she would win her first match, beating Barbara Knapp 6-2, 6-2, and nearly upset the world's number-one ranked player, Louise Brough, in the next round before losing the next day.
- The mission by United Nations envoy Owen Dixon, to resolve the Kashmir conflict between India and Pakistan, ended with his announcement that there was "no immediate prospect of settlement" and that "no purpose can be served by my remaining any longer on the sub-continent". An Indian journalist would note more than 50 years later that "He came within a few feet, if not inches, of solving the Kashmir dispute and bagging the Nobel Prize for Peace."
- Born: Lewis "Scooter" Libby, American presidential and vice-presidential advisor, convicted of perjury in 2007; in New Haven, Connecticut
- Died:
  - Frank Phillips, 76, American oil entrepreneur who co-founded Phillips Petroleum and the Phillips 66 gasoline station chain
  - Kirk Bryan, 62, American geologist

== August 23, 1950 (Wednesday) ==
- Eight days after the August 15 earthquake that struck in the Assam State of northeastern India, the Subansiri River broke through the blockage caused by landslides from the quake, sending 23 foot high waves through villages downstream, and killing 536 people.

== August 24, 1950 (Thursday) ==
- France agreed to send an infantry battalion to fight in the Korean War. More than 1,000 persons, including 211 commissioned and non-commissioned officers, would arrive on November 30. There were 3,421 people serving with the French Battalion during the war. In all, France lost 287 dead in Korea, along with 1,350 wounded, seven missing in action, and 12 POWs. On October 22, 1953, the remaining soldiers of the French Battalion were transferred to Vietnam as the Korea Regiment, and most of them would be killed by the following July.
- Died: Arturo Alessandri, 81, President of Chile from 1920 to 1924, 1925, and 1932 to 1938

== August 25, 1950 (Friday) ==
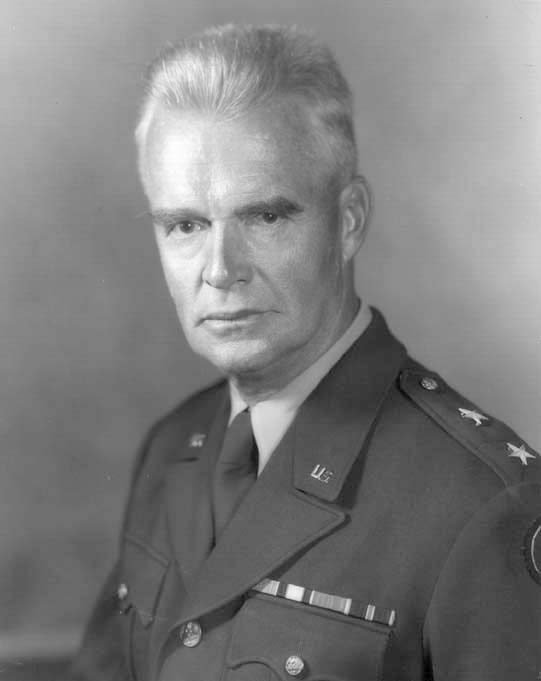
Major General Dean

- U.S. President Harry S. Truman issued an order for the federal government to take control of the 131 major railroads in the United States, effective 5:00 pm Washington time Sunday. The order came three days before a strike, affecting an estimated 1,700,000 railway workers, was scheduled to start. President W.P. Kennedy of the Brotherhood of Railroad Trainmen, and President R. O. Hughes of the Order of Railway Conductors welcomed the government action and called off the strike indefinitely, pending negotiations.
- The U.S. Army confirmed that two armored divisions of the Chinese Communist Army had massed along that nation's border with North Korea.
- After 36 days of avoiding capture by North Korean patrols, U.S. Army Major General William F. Dean was betrayed to the enemy by a South Korean civilian. Dean had been on the run since July 18, when his unit was overrun by North Korean troops. He would be the highest-ranking prisoner of war for North Korea, and finally be released on September 4, 1953.
- The U.S. hospital ship USS Benevolence sank in San Francisco Bay after being rammed accidentally by the freighter SS Mary Luckenbach, while both were sailing in a dense fog. No patients were aboard the Benevolence because it was on a trial run to prepare for service in Korea, but 31 of its 523 civilians and military personnel drowned.
- The Battle of the Bowling Alley (a name derived from the long, narrow valley in Chilgok, near Taegu, where the opposing forces clashed) was won by United Nations forces after two weeks of fighting.
- In a speech at the 150th anniversary celebration of the Boston Navy Yard, U.S. Secretary of the Navy Francis P. Matthews advocated the option of a preventive war by the United States, declaring that the U.S. should declare its intention "to pay any price, even the price of instituting a war to compel co-operation for peace", adding that by becoming "an initiator of a war of aggression, it would win for us a proud and popular title— we would become the first aggressors for peace." U.S. Secretary of State Dean Acheson immediately disavowed the foreign policy speech, stating that "Secretary Matthews' speech was not cleared by the Department of State, and it does not represent U.S. policy. The United States does not favor instituting a war of any kind. Matthews offered to resign, but President Truman allowed him to remain in office for another year.
- Belgium created the Corps Voluntaires Corea to fight in the Korean War, and sent 900 men in the 1st Belgian Battalion, which would arrive in December. The Belgians had 102 men killed.
- In tennis, Althea Gibson became the first African-American woman to compete at the United States National Championships (later known as the US Open).

== August 26, 1950 (Saturday) ==
- The office of U.S. Army General Douglas MacArthur sent the press an advance copy of an address regarding Formosa (now referred to in the press as Taiwan), site of Nationalist China and located off of the coast of Communist China. Released by MacArthur without White House approval, and meant to be read at the August 28 convention of the Veterans of Foreign Wars, the statement ran counter to the foreign policy of President Truman. U.S. Secretary of Defense Johnson directed MacArthur to withdraw the statement, but not before U.S. News & World Report published it in its upcoming issue.
- On the same day, China's premier Zhou Enlai met with his battle commanders regarding plans to invade Korea to confront American forces, and stated that "the main target is the U.S. imperialists".

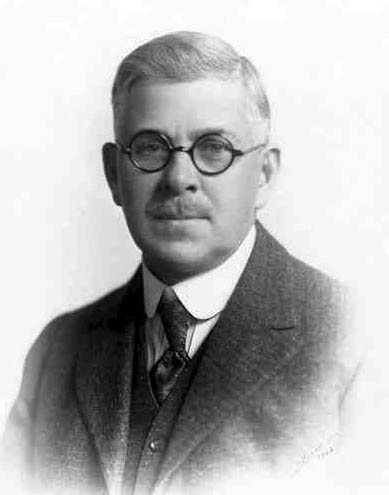
Ransom Olds

- Died: Ransom E. Olds, 86, American automotive pioneer who founded the Oldsmobile and REO Motor Car Company

== August 27, 1950 (Sunday) ==
- An F-51 aircraft, of the 67th Fighter Bomber Squadron of the U.S. Air Force, assigned to attack a North Korean airfield, flew off course and ended up attacking an airstrip in Communist China, five miles from the border. Chinese Premier and Foreign Minister Zhou Enlai asked the Soviet delegate to the UN Security Council, Yakov Malik, to raise the complaint, and on August 31, U.S. delegate Warren R. Austin admitted to the Security Council that the incident probably had occurred as described and offered to compensate
- The Battle of Kyongju began.
- Born: Charles Fleischer, American film actor best known for voicing the title character in Who Framed Roger Rabbit; in Washington, DC
- Died: Cesare Pavese, 41, Italian novelist, by suicide

== August 28, 1950 (Monday) ==
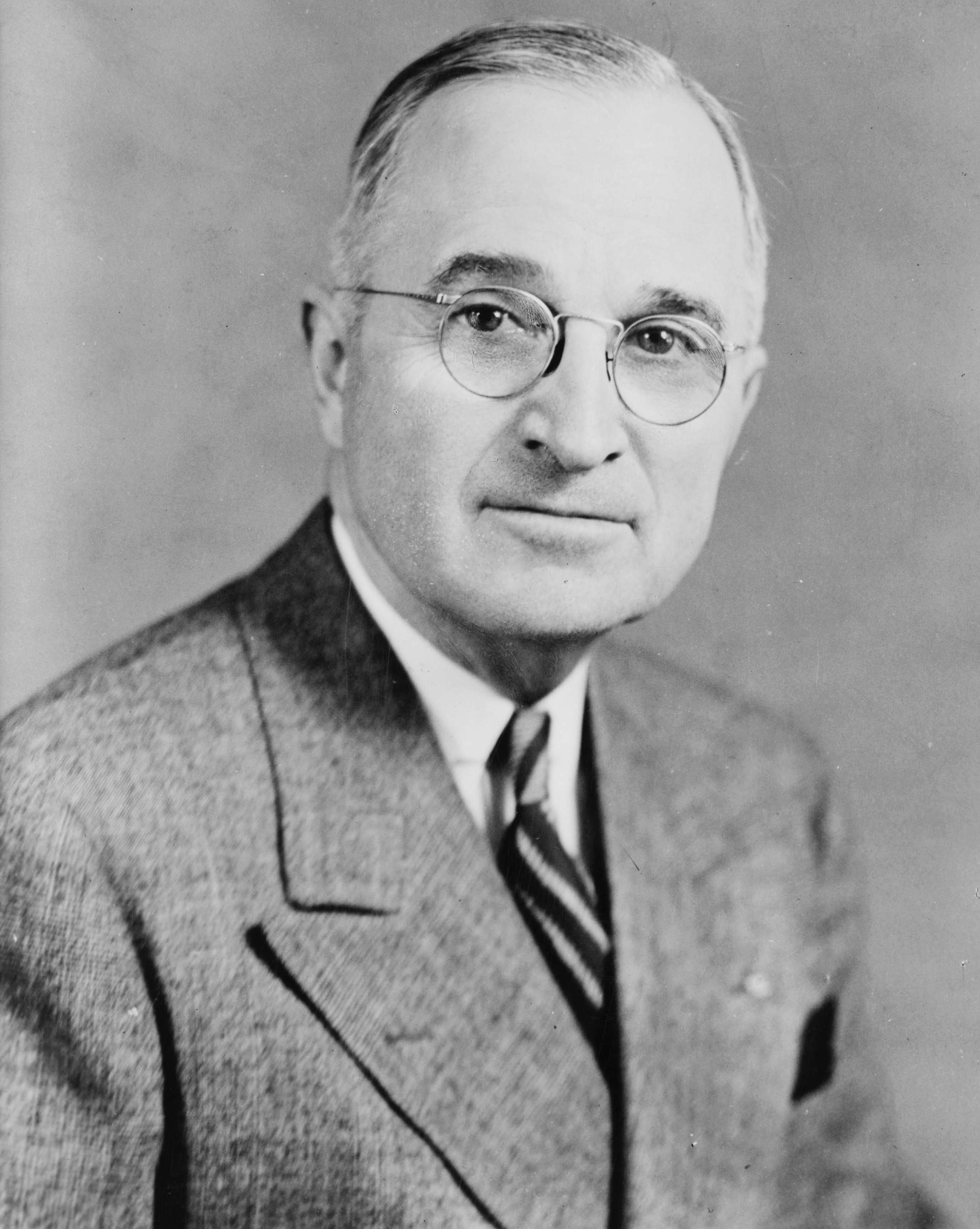
President Truman

- U.S. President Truman signed into law a bill that made 10,000,000 people (self-employed businesspersons, domestic servants and farm workers) eligible for Social Security retirement. A gradual increase in the federal payroll tax (at the time 1.5%) would go into effect in 1951 and be tripled by the year 1970. The average monthly benefit ($26) was increased to $46 effective October 1. Old-age coverage was extended was made optional for state and city government employees, including those of publicly owned transit systems, as well as employees of non-profit organizations.
- Soldiers from the United Kingdom arrived in South Korea, combining troops from the 27th Infantry Brigade and the Royal Irish Hussars. Of nearly 14,000 who served, 700 would be killed.
- Born: Ron Guidry, baseball player, in Lafayette, Louisiana

== August 29, 1950 (Tuesday) ==
- The International Longshore and Warehouse Union (ILWU) was expelled from the large labor union, the Congress of Industrial Organizations (CIO), two weeks after delegates to the annual ILWU convention voted not to let CIO representatives deliver an address.
- The first United Kingdom troops arrived in South Korea, as two battalions of the 27th Infantry Brigade reached the UN bridgehead at Pusan.
- Dillon S. Myer, the new U.S. commissioner of the Bureau of Indian Affairs, addressed a meeting of the National Congress of American Indians, in Bellingham, Washington, and pledged to the delegates that he would work toward increased self-determination for American Indians under BIA jurisdiction.
- Born: Victor J. Saracini, airline pilot who was killed when terrorists hijacked United Airlines Flight 175, then crashed it into the South Tower of the World Trade Center; in Atlantic City, New Jersey (d. 2001)

== August 30, 1950 (Wednesday) ==
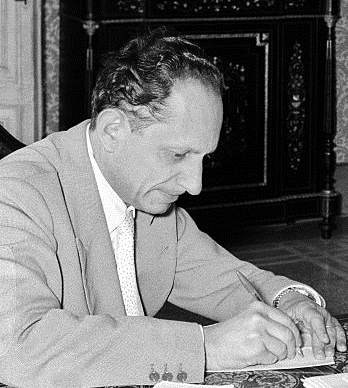
Pontecorvo

- The Civil Code of the Philippines went into effect, replacing the Civil Code of Spain that had set the law in the Asian nation since the 19th century.
- British atomic physicist Bruno Pontecorvo defected to the Soviet Union while on a visit to Sweden. "There was great concern that he might transmit nuclear secrets," an author would note later, "but apparently he did not have any essential information."
- Died: Alexandru Lapedatu, 73, former president of the Romanian Senate, died in the Sighet Prison, less than four months after being arrested in a roundup of dissenters by the ruling Communist government.

== August 31, 1950 (Thursday) ==
- All 55 persons on board TWA Flight 903, which had a scheduled final destination of New York City, were killed when the Lockheed L-749 Constellation crashed shortly after taking off from Cairo. The flight had originated in Bombay (now Mumbai) and was on the way to its next scheduled stop, in Rome.
- Television came to Mexico as XHTV Channel 4 began broadcasting programs in Mexico City Initial programming was for three hours each evening from 5:00 to 8:00, and required TV sets to add power converters adapt from the 60 cycles-per-second on American models to the 50 cycles/second used by XHTV.
- The battles of Haman and Nam River began as part of the larger Battle of Pusan Perimeter.
- Died: Pere Tarrés i Claret, 45, Spanish Roman Catholic priest who served as a doctor during the Spanish Civil War and was beatified in 2004
