= September 1950 =

Month of 1950

<<	September 1950					>>
Su	Mo	Tu	We	Th	Fr	Sa
					1	2
3	4	5	6	7	8	9
10	11	12	13	14	15	16
17	18	19	20	21	22	23
24	25	26	27	28	29	30

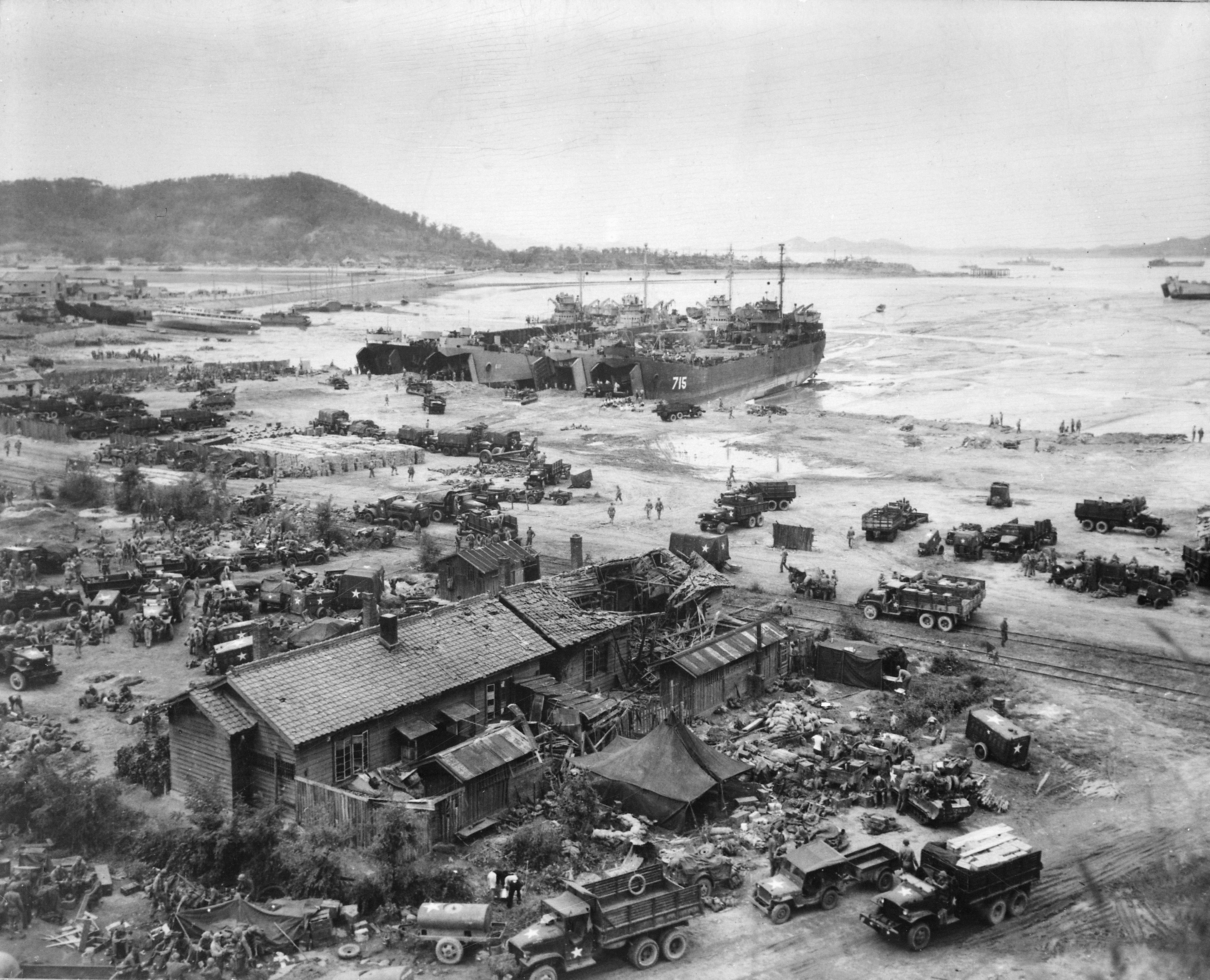
September 15–16, 1950: U.S. and U.N. forces land at Inchon

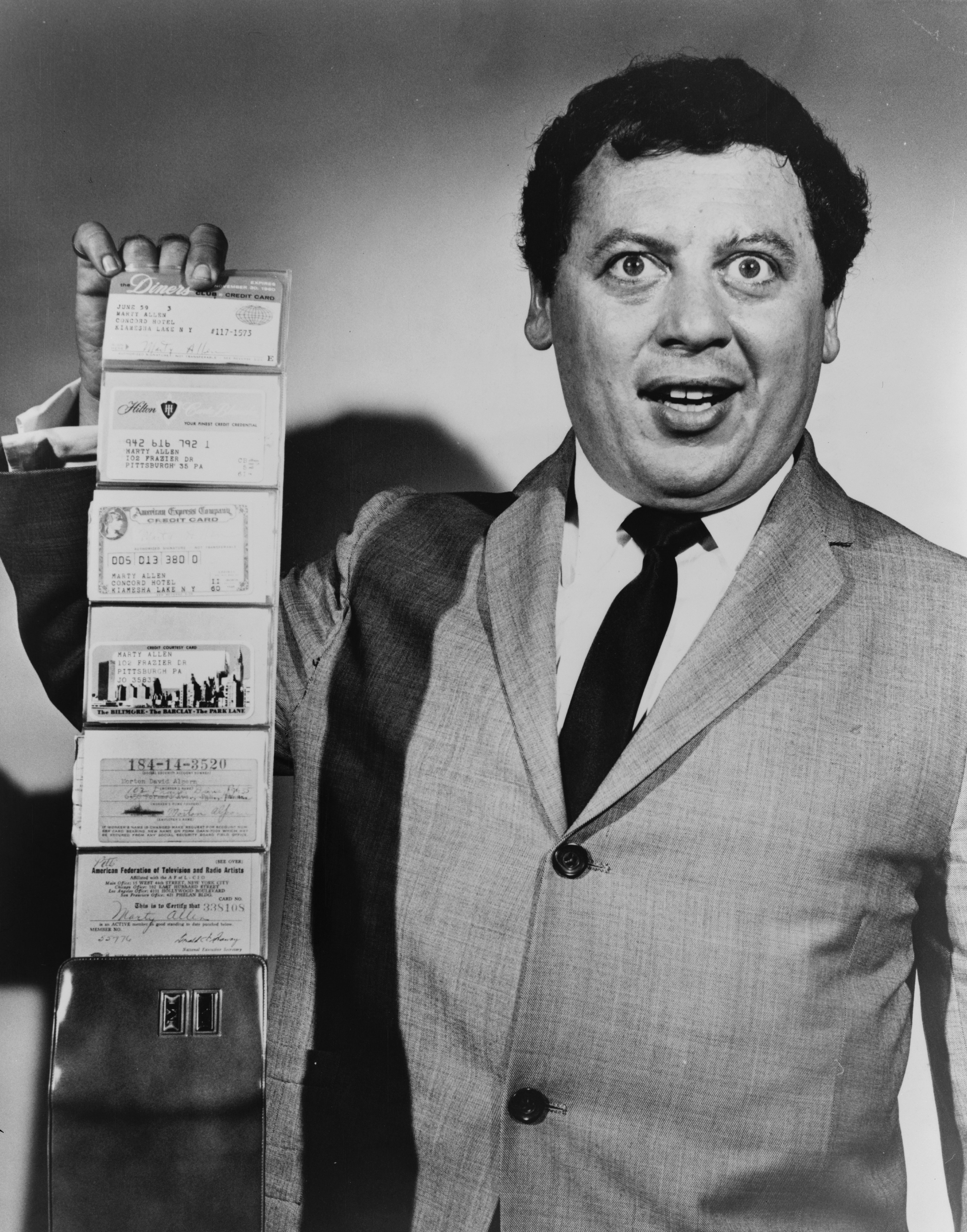
September 26, 1950: Americans introduced to credit cards (pictured: Marty Allen)

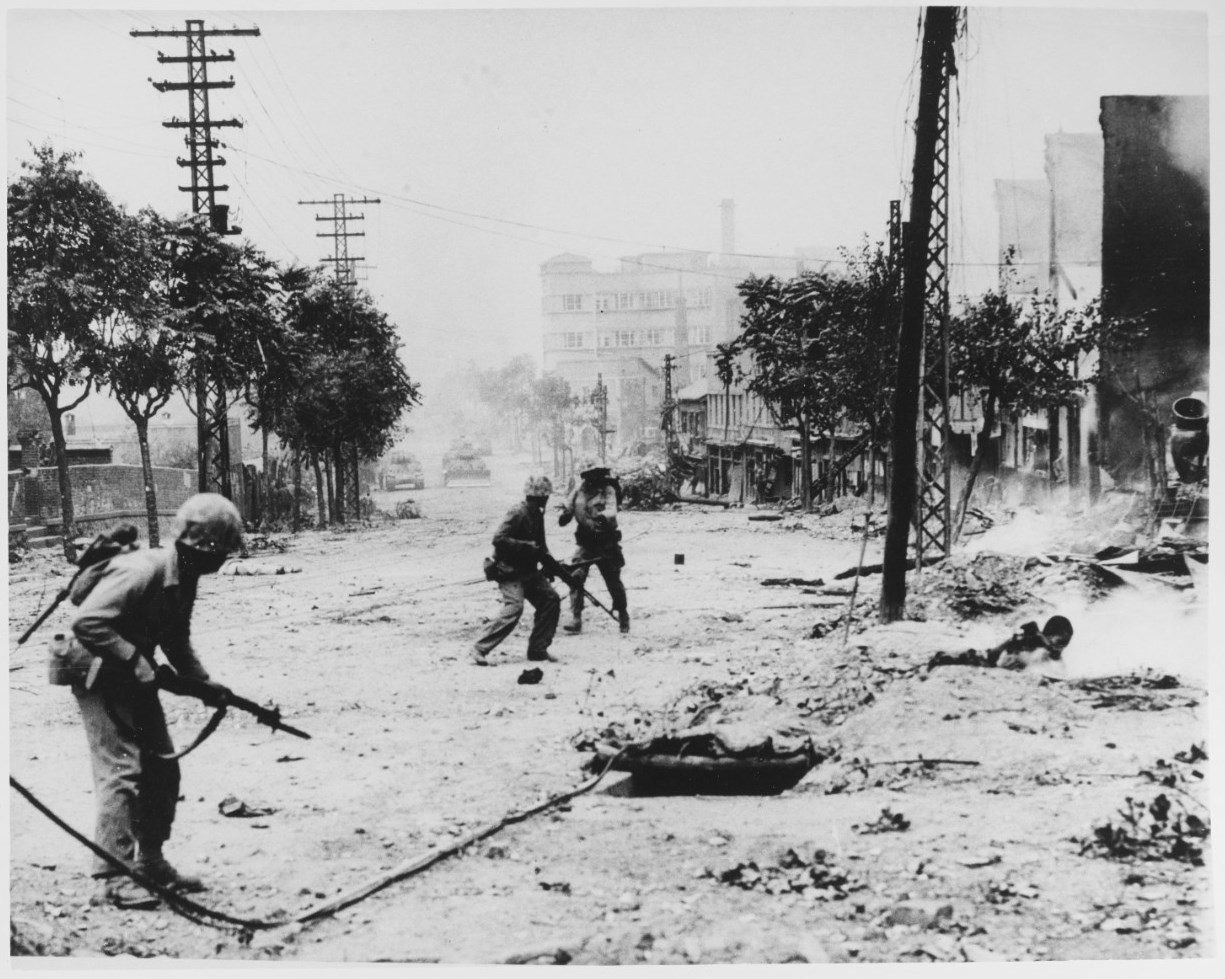
September 17–22, 1950: Seoul retaken from North Korean occupiers

The following events occurred in September 1950:

== September 1, 1950 (Friday) ==
- The Great Naktong Offensive and the Battles of Ka-san, Tabu-dong and Yongsan began as part of the larger Battle of Pusan Perimeter in the Korean War.
- The Federal Communications Commission released a statement that it favored the CBS technology for color television broadcasting. The FCC said also that the other two proposed systems (by RCA and by Color Television Incorporated) "fell short" of the FCC requirements, and recommended television set manufacturers to build sets that could receive both the CBS system and standard black-and-white analog signals. Television manufacturers declined to make sets that accommodated the CBS system, and eventually a different system by RCA would become the industry standard.
- Mao Zedong, the Chairman of China's Communist Party, gave a public warning that the People's Republic of China would not tolerate an invasion of any of its neighbors, which included North Korea.
- Both houses of the United States Congress passed the "Doctors' Draft" bill, authorizing any physician under the age of 50 to be inducted into the U.S. armed forces, but with priority on residents and interns.
- John Crabb, a 59-year-old immigrant from Denmark, was freed from the Topeka State Hospital, where he had been held since 1930 after being mistakenly adjudged insane. Crabb's confinement was blamed on his inability to clearly speak English and his bad temper. He was finally freed by the efforts of several insurance executives who spoke the Danish language and returned to Denmark.
- Born:
  - Phil McGraw, American TV personality and psychologist, host of Dr. Phil; in Vinita, Oklahoma
  - Mikhail Fradkov, Prime Minister of Russia 2004–2007; in Samara, Russian SFSR, USSR

== September 2, 1950 (Saturday) ==
- Israel forcibly relocated 4,000 Bedouin from its territory to its border with Egypt, and sent them into the Sinai Peninsula.
- Born:
  - Rosanna DeSoto, Mexican-American actress; in San Jose, California
  - Yuen Wah, Hong Kong born action-film star and stuntman; in Hong Kong

== September 3, 1950 (Sunday) ==
- The sale of "Israel bonds" was proposed by Israeli Prime Minister David Ben-Gurion as a means for getting immediate funds for the two-year-old Jewish nation.
- Communist China's Prime Minister Zhou Enlai sent word to the United Nations and the United States, by way of K. N. Panikkar (India's Ambassador to Beijing), that China would intervene in the Korean War if U.S. forces invaded North Korea.

== September 4, 1950 (Monday) ==
- The comic strip Beetle Bailey, created by Mort Walker, made its debut in 12 newspapers. In the first strip, "Beetle" began his first day as a student at "Rockview University", arriving with only his toothbrush. On March 12, 1951, Beetle would go to a U.S. Army recruiting station, begin a new career, and his strip would soar in popularity.
- The first NASCAR 500-mile race was held, as the Southern 500 took place at Darlington Raceway, at Darlington, South Carolina. Johnny Mantz won the event, which attracted 75 cars.
- A Soviet Air Force bomber was shot down off the coast of North Korea by two U.S. Navy fighter planes, after reportedly firing at UN naval forces. All of the crewmen on the downed aircraft were killed, while two other bombers escaped.
- The U.S. Fifth Air Force carried out the first rescue of a downed American pilot from behind enemy lines.
- Died: Max Davidson, 75, German-born American silent film comedian

== September 5, 1950 (Tuesday) ==
- The Battle of Yongsan ended in United Nations victory.
- Syria adopted its first Constitution, proclaiming itself a "Sovereign Arab Republic", providing for a democratically elected government and declaring that "Islamic law shall be the main source of legislation".
- Died: Al Killian, 33, American jazz trumpet player, was shot to death, along with his wife, by the janitor of the Los Angeles apartment house where the Killians resided. Killian and Roy Parker were arguing over payment of $15 when Parker fired four shots and fatally wounded the Killians.

== September 6, 1950 (Wednesday) ==
- Former librarian Beverly Cleary launched her career as a writer of popular children's fiction with the publication of Henry Huggins by the William Morrow Company, with illustrations by Louis Darling. The publisher asked Cleary to change the name of the dog to "Ribsy" and revised the title from its original name of Spareribs and Henry.

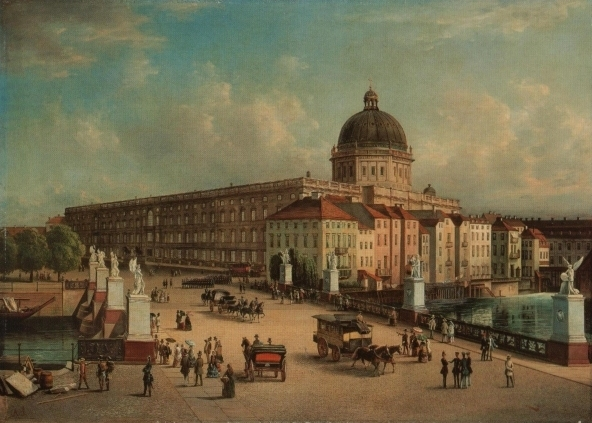
"Symbol of imperialism"

- Demolition of the Royal Hohenzollern Palace began in East Berlin, as part of a campaign by the government of East Germany's Communist government to remove symbols of Germany's former imperialism. Reconstruction of the palace would be approved by the Bundestag of a reunited Germany on July 4, 2002.
- Died: Olaf Stapledon, 64, British science fiction author

== September 7, 1950 (Thursday) ==
- The Nikkei 225 index, a measure of stock price rises and falls on the Tokyo Stock Exchange, was introduced.
- Qian Xuesen (H.S. Tsien), a Chinese-born professor at Caltech and one of the founders of the Jet Propulsion Laboratory, was arrested by the Immigration and Naturalization Service, a few days before he was scheduled to travel to the People's Republic of China to visit his sick father. Earlier in the year, his security clearance had been revoked when his name appeared in a document of the Communist Party USA. The United States Customs Service searched his luggage and found technical papers that appeared to have been accumulated from his work in aircraft and missile design. Qian would be returned to Communist China in 1955 as part of an exchange of prisoners of war, and would go on to found China's ballistic missile program.
- The first fiction by Ernest Hemingway, in more than a decade, was seen with the publication of Across the River.
- The game show Truth or Consequences made its debut on the CBS television network at 10:00 pm Eastern Time, after having been a successful radio program.
- Born:
  - Julie Kavner, American comedian, voice artist and TV actress, who voices Marge Simpson on The Simpsons, in Los Angeles
  - John Friedrich, "Australia's greatest conman", as Johann Friedrich Hohenberger, in Munich, West Germany (committed suicide, 1991)

== September 8, 1950 (Friday) ==
- The Defense Production Act was signed into law by U.S. President Truman, authorizing the President "to build—and maintain at perpetual readiness—U.S. industrial and military mobilization bases in case of an all-out war with the Soviet Union."
- The Canadian Forces Act was passed in Canada, authorizing the government to use military forces as necessary "to answer the needs of collective security" and paving the way for Canadian participation in the Korean War.
- Featherweight boxer Sandy Saddler knocked out champion Willie Pep to win the Featherweight Boxing Title with a TKO when Pep was unable to answer the bell for the 8th round due to a separated shoulder suffered at the end of the 7th round. Saddler avenged a lopsided decision he had lost 18 months earlier challenging for Pep's title.
- The science fiction short story collection The Voyage of the Space Beagle by A. E. van Vogt was published.

== September 9, 1950 (Saturday) ==
- The "laugh track" was introduced to television viewers with the premiere of The Hank McCune Show, a situation comedy, on the NBC television network. Although the short-lived show was not filmed in front of an audience, viewers could hear laughter and applause coming from an invention by sound engineer Charley Douglass. The laugh track would become a feature of most television comedies of the next few decades.
- China transferred its 9th Army Corps away from plans to attack Taiwan, moving it to the border with North Korea.
- U.S. President Harry S. Truman announced that four U.S. Army divisions would be sent to Europe to join the two divisions that were assigned to NATO.
- After more than eight years, soap rationing ended in the United Kingdom. The limitations on purchases of soap had been in effect since February 1942. Sugar rationing would end on September 12, 1953.
- Yolande Betbeze, Miss Alabama, was crowned Miss America 1951.

== September 10, 1950 (Sunday) ==
- Five days before the U.S. counterattack at Inchon in South Korea, 43 American warplanes dropped napalm canisters over Wolmido Island to clear ground for American troops, without warning the civilians living on the island. Other planes fired guns "strafing children, women, and old people". Declassified U.S. documents on the operation would be made public by the Truth and Reconciliation Commission in 2008.
- George Bernard Shaw, the 94-year-old British playwright, slipped from a ladder while trying to prune a tree and fractured his thigh. He would die less than eight weeks later, on November 2.
- The Colgate Comedy Hour premiered on the NBC television network as a direct competitor to Ed Sullivan's variety show on CBS (officially called Ed Sullivan's Toast of the Town). The Colgate show, which alternated hosts each week among Eddie Cantor, Martin and Lewis (the comedy team of Dean Martin and Jerry Lewis), and Fred Allen, would run for six seasons, ending in 1955.
- Born:
  - Joe Perry, American rock guitarist for Aerosmith; in Lawrence, Massachusetts
  - Rosie Flores, American country music singer; in San Antonio, Texas
- Died: Annie Montague Alexander, 82, American philanthropist

== September 11, 1950 (Monday) ==
- President Truman signed NSC 81, the recommendation of the National Security Council, expanding the original goal for the U.S. response in the Korean War. Rather than liberating South Korea, the plan became one of conquering North Korea in order to reunite the peninsula, with American troops to cross the 38th parallel that divided the two nations.
- The case of Bolling v. Sharpe began when 11 African-American students were denied enrollment in Washington, D.C.'s new John Philip Sousa Junior High School, because the U.S. Congress had voted years earlier for racial segregation of District of Columbia schools. The denial led to a suit which would be consolidated with the Kansas case Brown v. Board of Education, and on May 17, 1954, the striking down state and federal laws requiring racial segregation of schools.
- Thirty-three people were killed when a train, carrying U.S. Army recruits, stalled on the tracks in Ohio, and was struck by the Spirit of St. Louis express operated by the Pennsylvania Railroad.
- The New York Times crossword puzzle proved to be so popular that the Times began running it daily. The newspaper had refused to run a crossword at all until February 15, 1942, when it began a puzzle in its Sunday edition, though the paper continued to avoid running comic strips.
- Born: Eijun Kiyokumo, Japanese footballer with 42 caps for the Japan national team; in Kōshū, Yamanashi prefecture
- Died: Jan Smuts, 80, South African Field Marshal and former Prime Minister of South Africa

== September 12, 1950 (Tuesday) ==
- Louis A. Johnson was fired from his job as United States Secretary of Defense, when President Truman asked for his resignation.
- U.S. Secretary of State Dean Acheson met with British Foreign Secretary Ernest Bevin and French Foreign Minister Robert Schuman at the Waldorf-Astoria Hotel in New York City, and announced a change in American foreign policy that would later be called "the bomb at the Waldorf", proposing that the rearmament of Germany be allowed, with a new Army of West Germany to raise ten divisions of troops within NATO.
- The Battle of Kyongju ended in United Nations victory.
- The U.S. 8245th Army Unit staged an amphibious landing at South Korea's Kusan Bay as a diversion, three days in advance of the U.S. landing at Inchon.
- Dallas Christian College held its first classes.

== September 13, 1950 (Wednesday) ==
- The first census of West Germany was taken, 13 days after a similar count had been made in East Germany on August 31. The final count showed a population of 49,842,624 in West Germany, while the East German census had counted 18,388,172 people, for a total German population of 68,230,796.
- Three men on a fishing vacation in Glacier National Park, Montana — Aubrey Clyde Ollinger, James Pinney and John Provine — either drowned or died of hypothermia during a storm on Kintla Lake. Pinney and Provine's bodies were never recovered.
- Died: Sara Allgood, 70, Irish stage and film actress

== September 14, 1950 (Thursday) ==
- East Germany enacted its Reconstruction Law, setting out 16 principles of "socialist architecture" to be followed on all new construction of buildings. Based on Stalinist architecture, the concept would be abandoned after Stalin's Death.
- Men born on September 14, 1950, would later become those given highest priority by the draft lottery that would take place on December 1, 1969. Those persons who turned 19, 20, 21, 22, 23, 24, 25 or 26 years old on September 14, 1969, would find their birthday to be the first to be picked in the first draft lottery after World War II.
- Born:
  - Paul Kossoff, British rock guitarist in London (d. 1976)
  - Mike Nifong, American district attorney disbarred for misconduct in the Duke lacrosse case; in Wilmington, North Carolina
  - John Steptoe; American illustrator of children's books (d. 1989)

== September 15, 1950 (Friday) ==
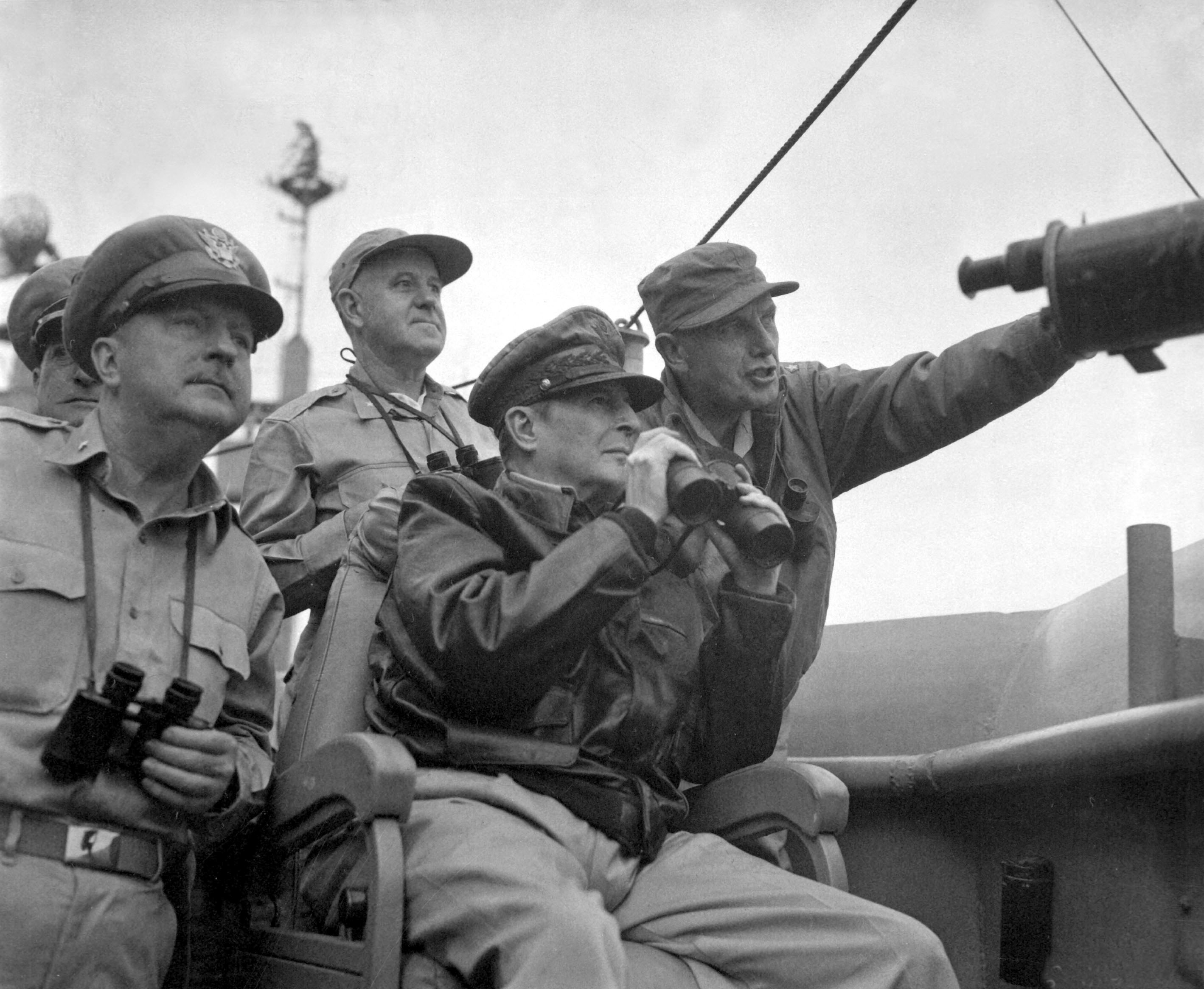
General MacArthur at Inchon

- At 6:33 a.m., the 3rd Battalion of the 5th U.S. Marines, commanded by Lt. Col. Raymond L. Murray, became the first American invaders at Inchon Harbor, going ashore on Wolmido Island and quickly overwhelming the North Korean People's Army soldiers there. By midnight, there were 13,000 Marines on the west coast of the Korean peninsula, with a loss of only 21 Americans dead, compared to hundreds of NKPA soldiers. The city of Inchon would be liberated the next day and the Marines would proceed to the South Korean capital, Seoul. Masterminded by U.S. Army General Douglas MacArthur, the Inchon landing was the beginning of the retaking of South Korea from its North Korean conquerors. The attack, combined with the UN forces' breakout from the Pusan Perimeter three days later, suddenly trapped the NKPA forces, concentrated in the south, behind enemy lines. The straits between the island and the mainland were dangerous, and navigation depended on predicting the time for high and low tides; one historian would write later, "As MacArthur had assumed, no one expected a landing there." Six hours before the Inchon landing, General MacArthur, along with U.S. Navy Vice-Admiral Arthur D. Struble, U.S. Marine Lt. Gen. Lemuel C. Shepherd, and U.S. Army Major Gen. Edward C. Almond rode in an unarmed boat to Woimi Island to observe the tides; a reporter would write the next day that "The North Koreans had a chance to kill Gen. Douglas MacArthur and the rest of the top commanders of the United Nations invasion forces with one well-placed artillery shell. But they muffed it. They didn't fire a single shot."
- The Great Naktong Offensive ended in failure, leaving North Korean forces at a disadvantage against United Nations counterattack.

== September 16, 1950 (Saturday) ==
- The 1950 NFL season opened with a game between the defending NFL champion Philadelphia Eagles, and the Cleveland Browns, who had been the 1949 champions of the All-America Football Conference (AAFC) before the two leagues had merged. During the four years of the AAFC's existence, the NFL and AAFC champions had never played each other; the Browns defeated the Eagles 35–10.
- In a convoy of fifty trucks, the North Korean Army drove 1,250 South Korean and American prisoners of war to a mountain valley, fed them rice and wine, and then, after being signaled by a blue flare, carried out a massacre of the group. Listed as "Korean War Crimes case number 279" in 1953, the evidence of the incident came from a North Korean prisoner who said that he was one of the drivers, and whom the interrogating officers concluded was credible.
- Both Houses of Congress approved a waiver of the law against a recently retired military man from becoming U.S. Secretary of Defense, clearing the way for General George C. Marshall to assume the office. The House of Representatives approved the measure 202–103, and the Senate followed 47–21.
- Born: Henry Louis Gates, African-American literary critic; in Keyser, West Virginia

== September 17, 1950 (Sunday) ==
- After successfully counterattacking at Inchon, the United States Marines fought their way inland and entered the outskirts of the South Korean capital, Seoul, for the first time since the city had been captured by North Korean invaders in June.
- A Miami Herald reporter whose stories were sometimes picked up by the Associated Press, E. V. W. Jones, published the first known press coverage to describe a pattern of disappearances in what would later be referred to as "The Bermuda Triangle". Jones titled his story "Sea's Puzzles Still Baffle Men In Pushbutton Age". The story began with the recent news item about the April 6 disappearance of an American freighter, the Sandra, in the Caribbean Sea, and recounted other recent incidents. The illustration accompanying Jones' story suggested a triangle with points at Bermuda, San Juan, Puerto Rico and Miami.
- India extended diplomatic recognition of the government of Israel.
- Kurt Lischka, who had led the Gestapo during Germany's occupation of France during World War II, was sentenced by a Paris court, in absentia, to life imprisonment. Lischka had been imprisoned in France in 1945, then extradited to Czechoslovakia in 1947 for war crimes there, but had been released on August 22, 1950, and settled in West Germany. Despite his war crimes convictions, Lischka would serve as a judge for a West German court during his freedom but would eventually be convicted on other charges in a German court. On February 2, 1980, he would be given a ten-year prison sentence, dying in 1989.
- Born: Narendra Modi, Indian politician, Chief Minister of Gujarat (2001-2014), Prime Minister of India (since 2014); in Vadnagar, Bombay State (now Gujarat)
- Died:
  - Ed Bolden, 69, African-American baseball executive who owned the Philadelphia Stars Negro league team, and had been a co-founder of the Eastern Colored League
  - Marc Benoît-Lizon, 28, French Olympic skier who appeared for the French team for the (military patrol) demonstration at the 1948 Winter Olympics, was killed in action during the First Indochina War.

== September 18, 1950 (Monday) ==
- Three days after U.S. forces made the landing at Inchon, the U.S. Eighth Army and United Nations forces were able to break out of the Pusan Perimeter in southeast Korea, turning the tide of the Korean War. Suddenly, the troops of the North Korean People's Army were between two fronts, with General MacArthur's troops to the north, and General Walker's forces to the south.
- Television broadcasting began in Brazil, as TV Tupi Difusora started transmission on Channel 3 in São Paulo.
- Colombia entered the Korean War by volunteering the use of the Colombian Navy's only frigate, the Almirante Padilla, which would see service in the war between March 20 and September 9 of 1951.
- Born:
  - Darryl Sittler, Canadian ice hockey player; in St. Jacobs, Ontario
  - Anna Deavere Smith, American TV actress and playwright; in Baltimore

== September 19, 1950 (Tuesday) ==
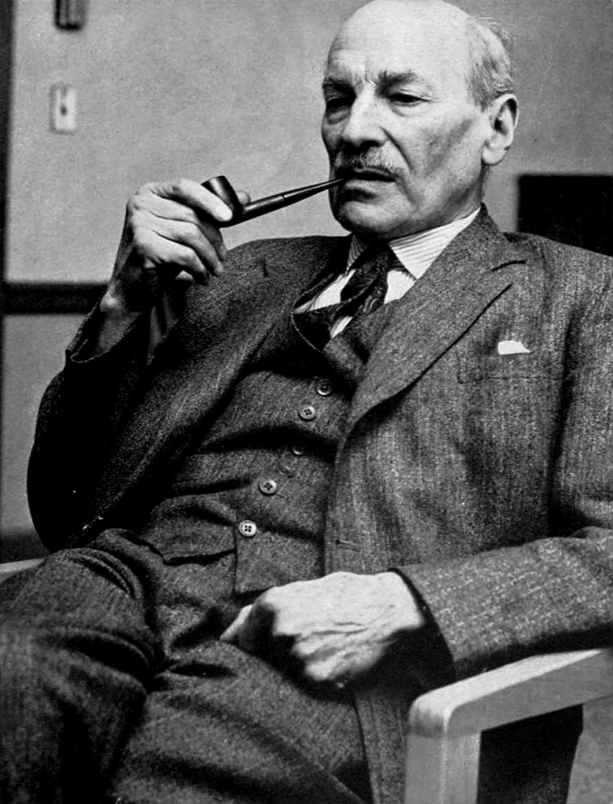
Attlee

- In a vote of confidence in the British House of Commons, the Labour government of Prime Minister Clement Attlee was sustained by a margin of only six votes, 306 to 300. Some of the Labour Party MPs, absent because of illness, were brought in by the party so that they could vote.
- The European Payments Union was created, for the benefit of fifteen Western European nations, to stabilize their currencies. The United States contributed $350,000,000 to the endowment fund.
- A the opening of the fifth annual session of the United Nations General Assembly, the United States, United Kingdom and France sent word to the Soviet Union, that an attack by any nation on West Berlin, or on West Germany, would be considered an act of war against the three Western powers.
- The UN General Assembly voted 33–6 to reject a proposal to expel the Republic of China (located on the island of Taiwan) and to replace representation of the Chinese people with a delegation from the Communist government of the People's Republic of China.
- An attack by North Korean forces was repelled at the Battle of Nam River.
- The musical film The Toast of New Orleans starring Mario Lanza, Kathryn Grayson and David Niven premiered in New Orleans.

== September 20, 1950 (Wednesday) ==
- The U.S. Navy carried out Operation Sea-Spray in the San Francisco Bay Area in California, a secret biological warfare experiment, with the spraying of the Serratia marcescens bacteria, believed at the time to be harmless, over the area, followed by another test with Bacillus globigii. Twenty-six years later, an investigative report in the New York City area newspaper Newsday would allege that the U.S. Army conducted a similar experiment on September 26 that caused eleven people to become ill from Serratia, one of them fatally.
- The Internal Security Act of 1950, also known as the McCarran Act, was passed by the United States Senate after earlier passing the House. The Act required Communist organizations to register with the U.S. Attorney General, prohibited the employment of Communists in federal government jobs, barred the issuance of passports to members of Communist organizations, and, in a clause called the "detention act", gave the President the power to declare an emergency for the purpose of placing suspected Communists and Communist sympathizers into detention camps.

== September 21, 1950 (Thursday) ==
- For the first time, a helicopter was able to fly up and over the Alps mountain range, with a Bell 47 functioning at sufficient altitude in the thinner air.
- Born:
  - Bill Murray, American comedian and actor; in Wilmette, Illinois
  - Charles Clarke, British Home Secretary 2004–2006; in Hammersmith
  - Antanas Valionis, Foreign Minister of Lithuania, 2000–2006; in Kėdainiai, Lithuanian SSR, USSR
- Died: Edward Arthur Milne, 54, British mathematician and astrophysicist

== September 22, 1950 (Friday) ==
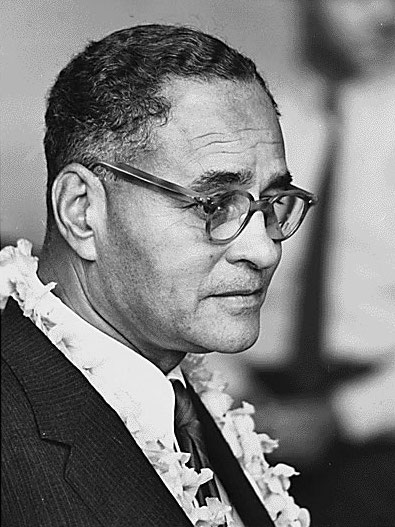
Ralph Bunche

- The liberation of the capital of South Korea began as the U.S. 1st Marine Regiment, led by Colonel Lewis "Chesty" Puller, became the first American unit to arrive in Seoul.
- Dr. Ralph Bunche was named as the winner of the 1950 Nobel Peace Prize, becoming the first African-American to win the award. Bunche was honored for his work in brokering ceasefire agreements between Israel and her Arab neighbors.
- Omar Bradley was promoted to the rank of General of the Army, commonly referred to as a "five star general", becoming the fifth and last person to achieve that rank.
- Born: Kirka Babitzin, Finnish musician; in Helsinki (d. 2007)

== September 23, 1950 (Saturday) ==
- The Battle of Hill 282 was fought near Seongju, resulting in stalemate.
- The U.S. Senate voted 57–10 to override President Truman's veto of the Internal Security Act, a day after the House had voted 286–48, passing the bill into law.
- UN warplanes in South Korea mistakenly attacked British troops at the village of Sangju, killing or wounding 60 Britons by gunfire and napalm bombs. "The British were on one hill, and the Communists on the next one", and the bomber pilots "picked the wrong hill" to attack after air support had been called in.
- Died:
  - Kenneth Muir, British soldier who was posthumously awarded the Victoria Cross for his heroism at Seongju
  - Sam Barry, 57, American college sports coach who guided both the basketball and baseball teams for the University of Southern California, as well as being an assistant for the USC football team

== September 24, 1950 (Sunday) ==
- Much of the midwestern United States and Ontario were darkened in the afternoon, from noon until about three o'clock, by thick smoke that had originated from the Chinchaga fire in western Canada. In Cleveland, the early-afternoon baseball game between the Indians and the Detroit Tigers was played with the lights on.
- The word "brainwashing", an adaptation of the Chinese term hsi nao (literally, "mind cleansing"), first appeared in print. Edward Hunter had coined the term for his newspaper article about a manipulation tactic used in Communist China, headlined "'Brain-Washing' Tactics Force Chinese into Ranks of Communist Party" in the Miami Sunday News.
- Operation Magic Carpet, the emigration of 47,000 Jews from Yemen to Israel, was completed, with the arrival of a final air transport.
- Died: Humphrey Jennings, 43, British documentary filmmaker, after falling from a cliff while scouting for locations for a new film. The Good Life, about European health care, was to have been filmed at the Greek island of Poros.

== September 25, 1950 (Monday) ==
- Television transmission by a microwave relay system began between New York and Chicago, with A T & T technology replacing the prior system of repeater stations every 25 miles.
- The night before he was scheduled to testify before the Kefauver Committee about his findings on organized crime in Chicago, former police detective William J. Drury was murdered outside his home by hitmen. Later in the evening, Chicago attorney Marvin J. Bas, another investigator, was shot to death as well.
- Died: George Kingsley Zipf, 48, American linguist and philologist

== September 26, 1950 (Tuesday) ==
- The Second Battle of Seoul ended in United Nations victory as Seoul, the capital of South Korea, was recaptured from the North Korean Army a day after the 7th Division Infantry of the U.S. Marines overran North Korean defenses at South Mountain. The 17th Regiment of the South Korean Army crossed the Han River into Seoul, while the United States 8th Army was 40 miles away and closing in from the south.
- Retreating back to North Korea, the North Korean Army took with it 376 U.S. prisoners of war, who were forced to march to Pyongyang, 250 miles away, over the next three weeks. Sixty American POWs at Daejon were massacred by their North Korean captors.
- The first infiltration by U.S. soldiers into North Korea began as nine agents, of Unit 4 from the 21st Troop Carrier Squadron, parachuted to the north of retreating North Korean soldiers.
- On the day of Seoul's liberation, the U.S. Navy destroyer USS Brush struck a mine while shelling North Korea, killing 13 men and injuring 31.
- The North Atlantic Council, composed of the representatives of the NATO nations, approved "the strategy of placing the maximum number of armed forces" in West Germany and West Berlin, close to the Soviet forces in Eastern Europe.
- At a mine near the English village of Creswell, Derbyshire, 80 underground coal miners were killed by carbon monoxide poisoning, while another 120 were able to escape to the surface.
- The smoke from Canadian forest fires, which had darkened the eastern United States two days earlier, moved into the skies over Europe. Due to the scattering of light rays by the unusual dispersal of smoke particles, the smoke caused the appearance of a blue Sun, and, that evening, a (literally) blue moon, an effect not seen since the 1883 eruption of the Krakatoa volcano. Coincidentally, the shadow of the Earth darkened the Moon that morning as well in a lunar eclipse.
- The first advertisement for a credit card appeared, with an ad in the New York Times for Diners Club that was headlined "Say 'Charge It" At any of the fine restaurants listed below!"

== September 27, 1950 (Wednesday) ==
- General Douglas MacArthur was authorized by the U.S. Joint Chiefs of Staff, with approval by President Truman, to cross the 38th parallel to invade North Korea, as long as there was no indication of an invasion by Soviet or Chinese forces. The directive added, "Under no circumstances, however, will you cross the Manchurian or USSR borders of Korea and, as a matter of policy, no non-Korean ground forces will be used in the north-east provinces bordering the Soviet Union or in the area along the Manchurian border."
- The U.S. Eighth Army, approaching from the west, and X Corps, coming from the south, linked up at Osan, forcing the retreat of the North Korean People's Army from South Korea.
- World Heavyweight boxing champion Ezzard Charles defeated former champion Joe Louis in a unanimous decision following a 15-round bout at Yankee Stadium.

== September 28, 1950 (Thursday) ==
- Indonesia was admitted as the 60th member state of the United Nations.
- Born:
  - Christina Hoff Sommers, American author and philosopher, in Sonoma County, California
  - John Sayles, American film director; in Schenectady, New York
  - Laurie Lewis, American bluegrass musician; in Long Beach, California

== September 29, 1950 (Friday) ==
- The liberation of Seoul was celebrated with the return of South Korean President Syngman Rhee and U.S. Army General Douglas MacArthur, appearing together at a noontime ceremony to mark the return of the government to the capital, which had been seized by the People's Army of North Korea in June. General MacArthur declared to the crowd, "By the grace of a merciful Providence, our forces, fighting under the standard of that greatest home and inspiration of mankind, the United Nations, have liberated this ancient city of Seoul."; at the same time, choosing to liberate Seoul rather than cutting off the escape of the North Koreans from Pusan, allowed 30,000 enemy troops to flee back across the border.
- The Hazel Scott Show, which had premiered in the U.S. on the DuMont Television Network on July 3, was cancelled one week after she had testified before Congress to deny that she was a Communist sympathizer.
- The Detroit Tigers lost to the Cleveland Indians, 12–2, eliminating them from any chance of winning the American League baseball pennant, and giving the New York Yankees their seventeenth AL title by default.

== September 30, 1950 (Saturday) ==
- Nearly six months after it had been presented to him by the National Security Council, President Truman signed NSC 68 "as a statement of policy to be followed over the next four or five years". The policy, designed to keep the Soviet Union and China from expanding their influence and control of the world, would be policy for more than forty years. Afterward the United States defense budget more than tripled over the next three years, from $13 billion in 1950 to $48.7 billion in 1953, with foreign military assistance to friendly nations, production of new nuclear weapons, the opening of air bases "that virtually encircled the Soviet Union and China" and increased covert operations.
- The British Medical Journal published "Smoking and Carcinoma of the Lung: Preliminary Report", the results of the epidemiological study on the relationship of cigarette smoking and lung cancer, made by doctors Richard Doll and Austin Bradford Hill, who concluded that "smoking is a factor, and an important factor, in the production of carcinoma of the lung".
- The first International Astronautical Congress was held, with more than a thousand scientists, mostly from Europe, assembling in Paris.
- Troops from Afghanistan invaded neighboring Pakistan in a border dispute over the Baluchistan region. The invaders were driven back by the Pakistani army within a week.
