= Arnold Andenmatten =

Swiss skier and skiing instructor (1922–2018)

Personal information
- Born: 22 August 1922 Saas-Fee
- Died: 24 March 2018 (aged 95)

Sport
- Sport: Skiing

World Cup career
- Indiv. wins: Olympic Gold Medalist 1948

Arnold Andenmatten (22 August 1922 – 24 March 2018) was a Swiss skier and skiing instructor.

== Biography ==
Born in Saas-Fee, Andenmatten was the winner of the first classical glacier downhill skiing from the Allalinhorn down to Saas-Fee in 1946 (time: 8:07 min.). As a soldier, he participated in the demonstration event, military patrol. He had the military rank of a Kanonier at this time. His Swiss team (R. Zurbriggen, H. Zurbriggen, Vouardoux, Andenmatten) finished first in the military patrol event. In 1947 he, Robert Zurbriggen, Karl Hischier and Karl Bricker also won the revenge race in Oslo. In 2008, at the age of 84, he was still participating in ski races, for example, as the eldest competitor of the Saas-Balen valley race on 17 February 2008.
