= Bozonnet =

Bozonnet is a French surname. Notable people with the surname include:

- Marcel Bozonnet (born 1944), French actor
- Ulysse Bozonnet (1922–2014), French mountain infantry soldier and skier
