= Hischier =

Hischier is a surname. Notable people with the surname include:

- Karl Hischier (1925–2016), Swiss cross-country skier
- Konrad Hischier (1935–2012), Swiss cross-country skier
- Luca Hischier (born 1995), Swiss ice hockey player
- Nico Hischier (born 1999), Swiss ice hockey player
