= Jaroslav Šír =

Czech soldier and skier (born 1923)

Personal information
- Born: 8 November 1923 Poniklá, Czechoslovakia

Sport
- Sport: Skiing
- Club: Armádní tělocvičný klub

Jaroslav Šír (born 8 November 1923) is a Czech former soldier and skier who competed for Czechoslovakia.

== Biography ==
Šír was born in Poniklá on 8 November 1923. He started skiing in the age of 15, and was in the national ski team from 1948 to 1955. As a conscript he served at the army sports club in Prague (Armádní tělocvičný klub). In the rank of a private he was a member of the national Olympic military patrol team at the 1948 Winter Olympics which placed sixth. In that time, Šír lived in Liberec. Before they went to St. Moritz, they trained in Špindlerův Mlýn.
