= Vital Vouardoux =

Swiss skier and mountain guide (1919–1977)

Vital Vouardoux (2 May 1919 – 20 October 1977) was a Swiss skier and mountain guide, who competed during his military service as team member of the Swiss military patrol team at the 1948 Winter Olympics (R. Zurbriggen, H. Zurbriggen, Andenmatten, Vouardoux), which placed first in the demonstration event. His rank was Gefreiter.

Vouardoux was born in Grimentz as son of Albert and Philomène Vouardoux. He belonged to the Bronze team (Fellay, Machoud, Vouardoux) of the 1943 Patrouille des Glaciers event, the first of three pure military editions of this race event during the time of World War II. In the 1950s/1960s he worked as a gamekeeper. He was married to Alice Vouardoux, née Salamin.
