= Lorentz Eide =

American biathlete (1924–1992)

Lorentz Martin Eide (January 30, 1924 – March 27, 1992) was a U.S. American soldier and Olympic biathlete.

Eide was born in Bergen, Norway. He served in the 38th Regimental Combat Team, Colorado. At the age of 24, in the rank of a private, he participated as member of the military patrol team At the 1948 Winter Olympics. The U.S. military patrol squad was led by first lieutenant Donald Weihs, who broke his ski after the team completed more than three-fourths of the 21,5 miles course. Weihs had to trample the last six miles with it. The team placed eighth of eight.
