= Edor Hjukström =

Swedish military officer and skier

- Born: Edor Albrekt Hjukström; 6 May 1916; Sorsele, Sweden
- Died: 27 October 2002 (aged 86); Stockholm, Sweden
- Military career
- Allegiance: Sweden
- Branch: Swedish Army
- Service years: 1942–?
- Rank: Lieutenant colonel
- Unit: Västerbotten Regiment
- Awards: Order of the Sword

Edor Albrekt Hjukström (8 May 1916 – 27 October 2002) was a Swedish military officer and skier. His last rank was lieutenant colonel. At the 1948 Winter Olympics he participated in the demonstration event military patrol (precursor to biathlon). His team finished first in the military patrol event.

== Early life ==
Hjukström was born on 8 May 1916 in Sorsele, Sweden, the son of Gustaf Hjukström, a forester, and his wife Ida (née Abrahamsson). He was the youngest son and he had three brothers. After his primary education he was a forestry worker for three years before he joined the Västerbotten Regiment in Umeå.

== Career ==
In 1937, Hjukström completed the NCO training at the Swedish Army Non-Commissioned Officer School in Uppsala, the Swedish Army warrant officers school, and achieved the higher education entrance qualification. In 1939 he won the army masterships. He had the rank of second lieutenant when he was transferred to the Dalarna Regiment in 1942, where he to part at the regiment's military patrol events in 1941, in 1942 and in 1944. In 1944 he was advanced to the rank of a lieutenant and became ski master of the Swedish Army in the following year. From 1946 to 1948 he was platoon leader at the Army Ranger School in Kiruna, and became captain in 1950, when he entered Military Academy Karlberg. From 1953 to 1955 he was General Staff candidate, became major in 1962, and was deputy battalion commander. In 1966, advanced to the rank of a lieutenant colonel, he was transferred to the Army Staff.

== Other work ==
He was chairman of the Society for the Promotion of Ski Sport and Open Air Life (Skid- och friluftsfrämjandet) in Umeå from 1965.

== Personal life ==
In 1954, Hjukström married Rosa Carlsson (born 1931), the daughter of master builder Carl Carlsson and Edith Carlsson. He was the father of Björn (born 1956) and Peter (born 1963).

As a pensioner, Hjukström lived in Stockholm and worked for a time as a real estate agent. He had a strong interest in politics and history and studied art history at university.

== Dates of rank ==
- 1942 – Second lieutenant
- 1944 – Lieutenant
- 1950 – Captain
- 1962 – Major
- 1966 – Lieutenant colonel

== Awards and decorations ==
- (Sweden) Knight of the Order of the Sword (1962)
- (Sweden) Swedish Central Federation for Voluntary Military Training Merit Badge
