= Tauno Honkanen =

Finnish skier (1927–2023)

Personal information
- Full name: Tauno Immanuel Honkanen
- Born: 9 October 1927 Kittilä, Finland
- Died: 27 March 2023 (aged 95) Rovaniemi, Finland

Sport
- Sport: Skiing
Medal record
Representing Finland

Tauno Immanuel Honkanen (9 October 1927 – 27 March 2023) was a Finnish skier. Honkanen was born in Kittilä. He was a member of the national Olympic military patrol team in 1948 which finished second. His military rank at his time was Sotamies. Honkanen died in Rovaniemi on 27 March 2023, at the age of 95.
