= Donald Weihs =

American biathlete (1922–2016)

Donald H. Weihs (September 7, 1922 – January 3, 2016) was an American military officer and Olympic biathlete.

== Biography ==
Weihs was born in Sherman, Texas, the son of Howard F. Weihs and his wife Marie Louise, née Gamblin. His brother Bill served in the army as well. Donald was recruited to the 38th Regimental Combat Team. At the age of 25 years, in the rank of a first lieutenant he was leader of the U.S. military patrol team at the demonstration event of the 1948 Winter Olympics in St. Moritz, Switzerland. Weihs had no long experience of skiing. During the competition, after the team completed more than three-fourths of the 21.5-mile course, his ski broke and he tramped the last six miles with the broken ski. The team (Lt Weihs, Sgt Walker, Pvt Henry Dunlap and Pvt Lorentz Eide) placed eighth of eight.
