= Stanley T. Walker =

Americansoldier and biathlete

Personal information
- Born: July 23, 1922 Peabody, Massachusetts, United States
- Died: June 3, 2013 (aged 90) Colorado Springs, Colorado, United States

Sport
- Sport: Skiing
Medal record
Representing United States

Stanley Theodore Walker (July 23, 1922 – June 3, 2013) was an American non-commissioned officer and Olympic biathlete.

== Biography ==
Walker was born in Peabody, Massachusetts, and learned skiing in his native New England hills. In the end of 1942, he was drafted from Lynn, Massachusetts to the 86th Regiment of the 10th Mountain Division in Camp Hale, where he became ski instructor. After leaving the army, he was re-enlisted in November 1945. He served mainly as ski and climbing instructor until 1958, and also as mountain and winter warfare instructor. From 1947 to 1950 he participated in six airplane rescue missions.

At the 1948 Winter Olympics he participated in the rank of a sergeant as member of the military patrol team. The U.S. military patrol squad was led by first lieutenant Donald Weihs, who broke his ski after the team completed more than three-fourths of the 21,5 miles course. Weihs had to trample the last six miles with it. The team placed eighth of eight.

After the games, Walker was on mission in the Korean War for 14 month. He participated at another ski race in Switzerland in 1957, and was member of the U.S. army biathlon team of 1958. Until his retirement in December 1963, he was also first sergeant in Augsburg (Germany) and advisor to Reserve unit in Chicago. Afterwards he moved to Colorado Springs, Colorado. After his retirement in 1963 he was a letter carrier in Colorado Springs, Colorado for over 20 years. He died on June 3, 2013, at the age of 90.
