= Giacinto De Cassan =

Italian cross-country skier (1917–1999)

Giacinto De Cassan (10 January 1917 – 13 February 1999) was an Italian cross-country skier. He was born in Rocca Pietore.

De Cassan was a financier and fought during World War II in the German military.

He participated in the demonstration event, military patrol (precursor to biathlon), in the 1948 Winter Olympics, when he had the military rank Caporalmaggiore. In 1948 he placed first, 1950 second and in 1951 he finished first again at the Italian masterships of cross-country skiing in the 50 km (and long distances) category.

Further notable results were:

- 1948: 1st, Italian men's championships of cross-country skiing, 50 km
- 1950: 2nd, Italian men's championships of cross-country skiing, 50 km
- 1951: 1st, Italian men's championships of cross-country skiing, 50 km

De Cassan died in Predaia on 13 February 1999.
