= Eero Naapuri =

Finnish skier and military officer

Personal information
- Full name: Eero Johannes Naapuri
- Born: 29 December 1918 Lammi, Finland
- Died: 14 December 1987 (aged 68) Helsinki, Finland

Sport
- Sport: Skiing
Medal record
Representing Finland
Men's Military patrol
World Championships
| Silver medal – second place | 1950 Lake Placid | Team |

Eero Johannes Naapuri (29 December 1918, Lammi – 14 December 1987, Helsinki) was a Finnish Colonel and skier.

Naapuri was born in Lammi. He was the leader of the national Olympic military patrol team in 1948 which placed second. His military rank at his time was Kapteeni. At the Nordic World Ski Championships 1950 he also finished second with his military patrol. He died in Helsinki.
