= Poniklá =

- Municipality
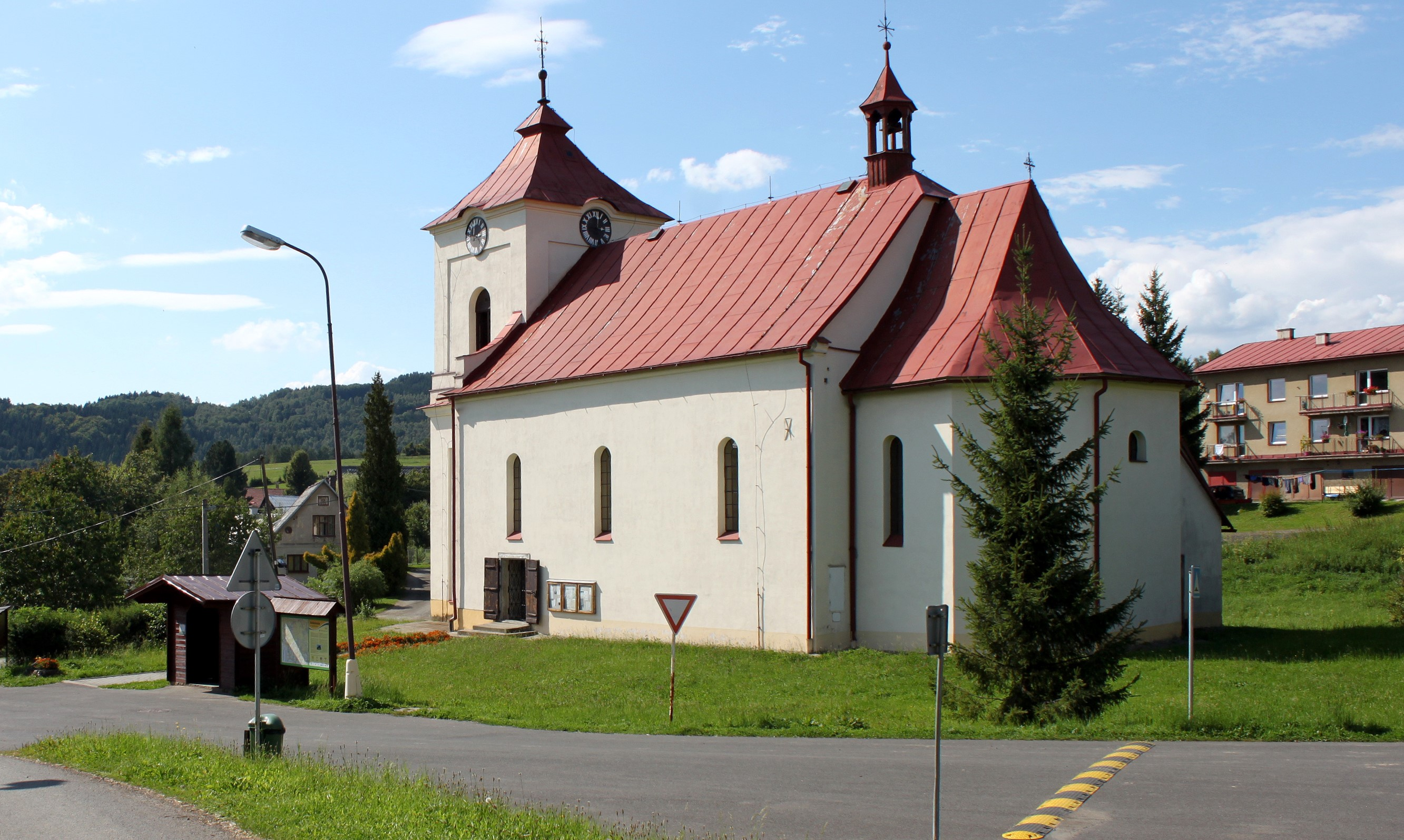
- Church of Saint James the Great

- Flag Coat of arms

- Location in the Czech Republic
- Coordinates: 50°39′42″N 15°27′48″E
- Country: Czech Republic
- Region: Liberec
- District: Semily
- First mentioned: 1354

Area
  - Total: 13.75 km^{2} (5.31 sq mi)
- Elevation: 490 m (1,610 ft)

Population (2026-01-01)
  - Total: 1,096
  - Density: 79.71/km^{2} (206.4/sq mi)
- Time zone: UTC+1 (CET)
  - Summer (DST): UTC+2 (CEST)
- Postal code: 512 42
- Website: www.ponikla.cz

Poniklá is a municipality and village in Semily District in the Liberec Region of the Czech Republic. It has about 1,100 inhabitants.

== Demographics ==
Historical population
Year	Pop.	±%
1869	2,341	—
1880	2,390	+2.1%
1890	2,421	+1.3%
1900	2,597	+7.3%
1910	2,966	+14.2%
1921	2,517	−15.1%
1930	2,441	−3.0%
1950	1,445	−40.8%
1961	1,507	+4.3%
1970	1,387	−8.0%
1980	1,327	−4.3%
1991	1,176	−11.4%
2001	1,208	+2.7%
2011	1,105	−8.5%
2021	1,045	−5.4%
Source: Censuses

== Economy ==
Poniklá is known for the handmade production of Christmas decorations from blown glass beads. This tradition dates back to the end of the 19th century. Since 2020, the production has been included in the UNESCO Intangible Cultural Heritage Lists.
