= Émile Paganon =

French military officer and skier (1916–2012)

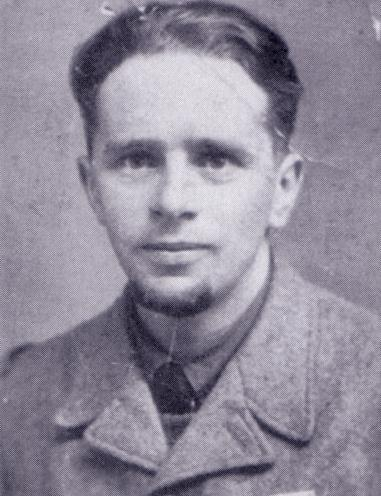

Personal information
- Born: 19 July 1916 Thônes, France
- Died: 24 January 2012 (aged 95) Bourg-Saint-Maurice, France

Sport
- Sport: Skiing
Medal record
Representing France

Émile Paganon (19 July 1916 – 24 January 2012) was a French military officer of the chasseurs alpins and skier. He was leader of the national Olympic military patrol team in 1948 which placed fifth.

Paganon was born in Thônes. He was married to Herminie with one son. The family lived in the French district Vercors, when he served as a ski reconnaissance platoon leader in the 6th Bataillon de chasseurs alpins in Gresse from 1941 to 1943 during World War II. In January 1943 their only son died. In the following years he was Lieutenant in the 3rd/7th Bataillon de chasseurs alpins in Savoy. For his merits in the battle of the Little St Bernard Pass he was awarded with the Bronze Star Medal by Montgomery.

He died at the age of 95 years in Bourg-Saint-Maurice.

== Bibliography ==
- Ulysse Bozonnet: Section Paganon. "Dans les cimes pour la liberté". L'esprit de résistance, de fraternité et de compétition. Chroniques des années 1930-1948, 2005.
