= Gilbert Morand =

Personal information
- Born: 11 July 1923 Jura department, France
- Died: 9 August 2008 (aged 85)

Sport
- Sport: Skiing
Medal record
Representing France

Gilbert Morand (11 July 1923 – 9 August 2008) was a French non-commissioned officer and skier.

== Sports ==
Morand was born in the Jura department. In the military rank of a Caporal-chef he was a member of the national Olympic military patrol team in 1948 which placed fifth. He also gained eight French military champion titles, including three individual titles.

== Military service ==
During World War II he joined the Maquis de l'Ain et du Haut-Jura. In 1944 he joined the army, where he served at the 24ème Bataillon de chasseurs (ranger battalion) during the campaign against the Germans, and participated in the occupation of Austria. He also served in the French Indochina War with the 27ème Régiment de Tirailleurs Algériens and the 10ème Bataillon de Parachutistes de Chasseurs à Pied, and in the Algerian War as a mountain reconnaissance platoon leader of the 7eme Bataillon de Chasseurs Alpins. After his military retirement in 1962 he worked as a civilian instructor at the École militaire de haute montagne (EMHM), in winters as trainer of the school's Nordic skiing team and in summers as a high mountain guide. From 1971 to 15 December 1981 he worked as technical adviser for the EMHM.

== Awards ==
- Chevalier of the Légion d'honneur, for service in Algeria
- Médaille militaire
- Officer of the Ordre national du Mérite
- Officer of the Mérite sportif
- Croix de guerre des théâtres d'opérations extérieures
- Croix de la Valeur Militaire (7 citations)
