= Stone Bridge, Riga =

Bridge in Riga, Latvia

Stone Bridge Akmens tilts
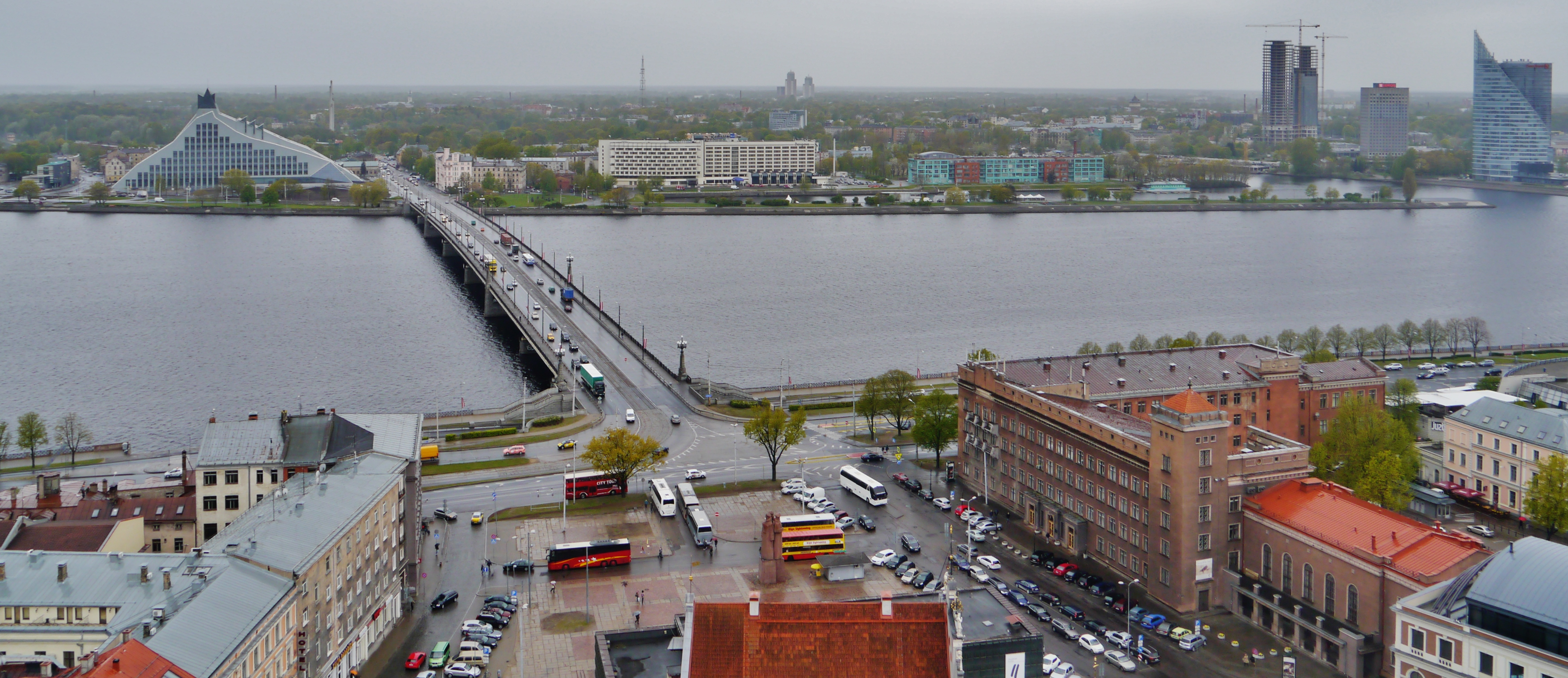
- Coordinates: 56.9445°N 24.1011°E
- Crosses: Daugava
- Locale: Riga, Latvia
- Other name(s): Until 1992 October bridge

Characteristics
- Material: Steel
- Total length: 503 meters
- Width: 27 meters

History
- Construction start: 1955
- Opened: 1957

Stone Bridge (Latvian: Akmens tilts) is a bridge over the Daugava River in Riga, Latvia. It was called the October Bridge (Oktobra tilts) until 1992.

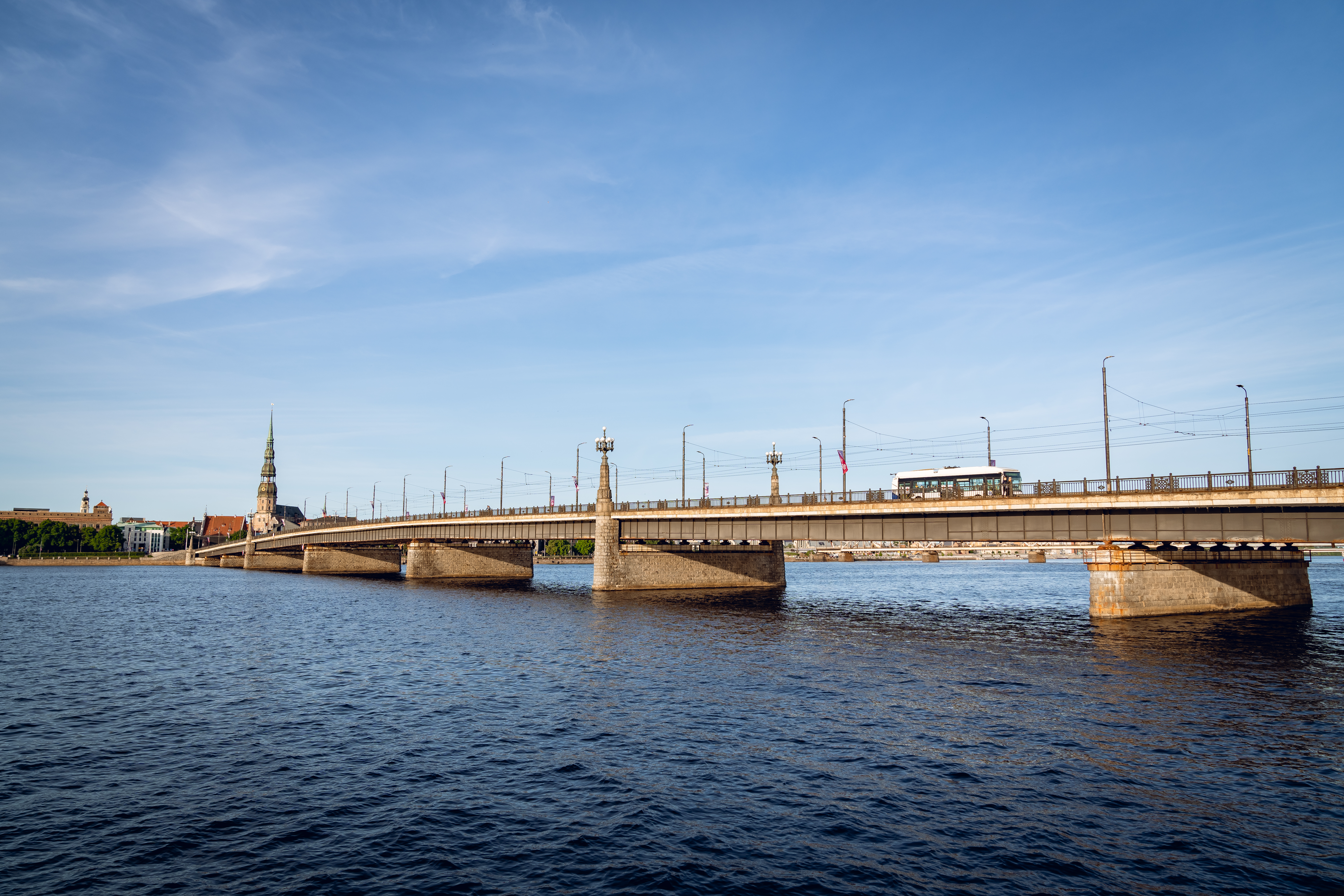
The bridge viewed from the river Daugava
