= Marc Benoît-Lizon =

French skier (1921–1950)

- Born: Marc Prosper Jacques Arthur Benoît-Lizon; 1 November 1921; Les Rousses, France
- Died: 17 September 1950 (aged 28); Đông Khê, French Indochina

Marc Prosper Jacques Arthur Benoît-Lizon (1 November 1921 – 17 September 1950) was a French skier. He competed in the military patrol at the 1948 Summer Olympics. He was killed during the First Indochina War.

== Personal life ==
Benoît-Lizon served as a master sergeant (sergent-chef) in the 3rd^{E} REI, French Foreign Legion during the First Indochina War. He commanded a partisan unit during the Battle of Đông Khê, and was severely wounded during the battle. He was bayoneted and killed by Viet Minh troops soon after.
