= The Witch (ballet) =

- Choreographer: John Cranko
- Music: Maurice Ravel
- Premiere: 18 August 1950; Royal Opera House, Covent Garden, London
- Original ballet company: New York City Ballet
- Genre: Neoclassical ballet
- Type: classical ballet

The Witch is a ballet made by John Cranko to Maurice Ravel's Piano Concerto in G Major (1931). The premiere took place Friday, 18 August 1950 at the Royal Opera House, Covent Garden, London.

== Original cast ==
- Melissa Hayden
- Francisco Moncion
