= Military patrol at the 1948 Winter Olympics =

At the 1948 Winter Olympics in St. Moritz, Switzerland in 1948, the last military patrol competition was held as a demonstration sport. This was in part due to the aftermath of World War II, which decimated Europe. This sport would be superseded by the biathlon competition which debuted at the 1960 Winter Olympics. The cross-country ski run was not prepared and was made by the leading Swiss team. The Czechoslovak participant Karel Dvořák described the weather of the day as extremely mild with temperatures of about 0 °C (32 °F) at the starting point at the upper cableway station (2,486 metres (8,156 ft)) on top of the Corviglia in the morning. The participants wore military equipment, 10 kilograms (22 lb) of baggage on the back and a military rifle. Only the officers, the patrol leaders, had pistols and did not compete in shooting. At the shooting range they had to shoot on three rubber balloons at a distance of 150 metres (490 ft). Every hit gave a bonus of 1 minute for the team.

Event held on 8 February 1948

| Place | Team | Time | Time subtractions | Adjusted Time |
|---|---|---|---|---|
| 1 | Switzerland (Robert Zurbriggen, Heinrich Zurbriggen, Vital Vouardoux, (Note: also findable as Xavier Vouardoux or X. Vouardoux in the Official report) Arnold Andenmatten) | 2:39:25.0 | 5 | 2:34:25.0 |
| 2 | Finland (Eero Naapuri, Vilho Ylönen, Mikko Meriläinen, Tauno Honkanen) | 2:46:23.0 | 9 | 2:37:23.0 |
| 3 | Sweden (Edor Hjukström, Holger Borgh, Karl Gustav Ljungquist, Fride Larsson) | 2:45:03.0 | 4 | 2:41:03.0 |
| 4 | Italy (Costanzo Picco, Aristide Compagnoni, Giacinto De Cassan, Antenore Cuel) | 2:52:03.0 | 2 | 2:50:03.0 |
| 5 | France (Emile Paganon, Marc Benoît-Lizon, Ulysse Bozonnet, Gilbert Morand) | 3:01:35.0 | 7 | 2:54:35.0 |
| 6 | Czechoslovakia (Vojtěch Pavelica, Karel Dvořák, Jaroslav Šír, Otto Skrbek) | 3:16:26.0 | 6 | 3:10:26.0 |
| 7 | Romania (Ştefan Ionescu, Constantin Vlădea, Niculae-Cornel Crăciun, Ion Kasky (Note: in other sources mentioned as Ion Koschi)) | 3:24:24.0 | 8 | 3:16:24.0 |
| 8 | United States (Donald Weihs, Stanley Walker, Henry Dunlap, Lorentz Eide) | 4:38:58.0 | 3 | 4:35:58.0 |
