= Karl Bricker =

Swiss cross-country skier (1923–1992)

Karl Briker
Personal information
- Full name: Karl Briker
- Born: 21 December 1923
- Died: 30 August 1992 (aged 68) Attinghausen, Switzerland

Sport
- Sport: Skiing

Karl Briker (21 December 1923 – 30 August 1992) was a Swiss cross-country skier who competed in the 1940s and in the 1950s. At the 1948 Winter Olympics he finished 41st in the 18 km competition. Four years later he finished 46th in the 18 km event at the 1952 Winter Olympics in Oslo.
