= Ulysse Bozonnet =

French mountain infantry soldier and skier

Joseph Ulysse Bozonnet (21 July 1922 – 13 January 2014) was a French mountain infantry soldier and skier.

In the military rank of a Caporal-chef he was a member of the national Olympic military patrol team in 1948 which placed fifth in the powder. Leader of the team was Émile Paganon who was Bozonnet's platoon leader in World War II. His brother Roland served also as a chasseur alpin. After Winter Olympics, Ulysse married Sidonie Francine Buillet. They developed a mountain farm in Haute-Tarentaise and they sold the famous ancient cheese Persillé.

== Bibliography ==
- Ulysse Bozonnet: Section Paganon: "dans les cimes pour la liberté". L'esprit de. résistance, de fraternité et de compétition: chroniques des années 1930-1948, Haute-Tarentaise, Haute-Maurienne, Val D'Aoste, Piemont, Tyrol, 2005. ISBN 978-2-84206-290-3

== Decorations ==
- Croix de Guerre
- Croix du combattant de l’Europe
