= Karl Hischier =

Swiss cross-country skier (1925–2016)

Personal information
- Born: 21 January 1925 Oberwald, Switzerland
- Died: 21 August 2016 (aged 91)

Sport
- Sport: Skiing

Karl Hischier (21 January 1925 – 21 August 2016) was a Swiss cross-country skier who competed in the 1950s. He finished 17th in the 50 km event at the 1952 Winter Olympics in Oslo. He was born in Oberwald.
