= August 1974 =

Month of 1974

<<	August 1974					>>
Su	Mo	Tu	We	Th	Fr	Sa
				1	2	3
4	5	6	7	8	9	10
11	12	13	14	15	16	17
18	19	20	21	22	23	24
25	26	27	28	29	30	31

The following events occurred in August 1974:

August 9, 1974: Richard Nixon boards Army One after resigning as President of the United States

== August 1, 1974 (Thursday) ==
- As part of the reforms of the "Metapolitefsi", the new civilian government of Greece restored the 1952 Constitution, which had been in effect prior to the April 1967 coup d'état. The government temporarily suspended constitutional provisions relating to the monarchy, pending the country's decision on whether to recall King Constantine.
- White House Chief of Staff Alexander Haig came to the home of U.S. vice president Gerald Ford at 514 Crown View Drive in Alexandria, Virginia, and told him to prepare to assume the presidency. Ford would write later in his 1979 memoir, A Time to Heal, "Al Haig asked to come over and see me, to tell me that there would be a new tape released on a Monday, and he said the evidence in there was devastating and there would probably be either an impeachment or a resignation. And he said, 'I'm just warning you that you've got to be prepared, that things might change dramatically and you could become President.' And I said, 'Betty, I don't think we're ever going to live in the vice president's house.'"
- The leadership of the United States House of Representatives tentatively scheduled debate on the impeachment of President Richard Nixon to run from August 19 to August 31 and approved gavel-to-gavel television coverage.
- A tugboat captain who fell asleep at the wheel rammed four barges into the Lake Pontchartrain Causeway in Louisiana, destroying 260 feet (79 m) of roadway. At least two people in vehicles on the bridge were killed.
- Former astronaut Alan Shepard, the first American in space and fifth man on the Moon, retired from the United States Navy after 30 years at the rank of Rear Admiral.
- Died:
  - Ildebrando Antoniutti, 75, Italian Roman Catholic cardinal and diplomat as Apostolic Delegate to Canada and then to Spain, was killed in an automobile accident near Bologna.
  - Harry Manning, 77, American mariner and aviator known for his overseeing the 1929 rescue of 32 crew of an Italian freighter, and for his record crossing the Atlantic in the maiden voyage of the ship United States in 1952. Manning was also a vice admiral in the United States Naval Reserve.
  - Ross Parker, 59, English songwriter known for the lyrics to "We'll Meet Again" and "There'll Always Be an England"

== August 2, 1974 (Friday) ==
- Uganda's president Idi Amin called off plans for a threatened invasion of neighboring Tanzania, a day after having ordered the Uganda Army and Uganda Army Air Force to go on full alert. After the mobilization, Tanzania's President Julius Nyerere warned that the African nation's armed forces were also on alert to repel any invasion. Amin's change of mind was disclosed in a telegram to the president of Liberia, William R. Tolbert.
- John Dean, former legal counsel to U.S. president Richard Nixon, was sentenced to a minimum of one year in prison and a maximum of four years for his role in the cover-up of the Watergate scandal.
- A fire aboard the Swedish motor ship Eos in the North Sea killed four people.
- American comedian and actor Shelley Berman was robbed at gunpoint of $60 and a watch and left bound and gagged on the floor of his hotel room in Queens, New York City.
- Born:
  - Siddharth Roy Kapur, Indian film and TV producer, founder of Roy Kapur Films; known for co-producing the highest-grossing Indian film to date, Dangal (2016) and the Netflix TV series Aranyak and the streaming SonyLIV series Rocket Boys; in Bombay (now Mumbai)
  - Angel Boris, American model and actress; in Fort Lauderdale, Florida
- Died:
  - Fred Allison, 92, American physicist known for the Allison magneto-optic method
  - Cyril Smith OBE, 64, English classical pianist, died of a heart attack.

== August 3, 1974 (Saturday) ==
- The 10-day Huntsville Prison siege ended with an escape attempt by drug baron Fred Gómez Carrasco and his two accomplices, during which two women hostages and one of Carrasco's cohorts were shot and killed and Carrasco committed suicide. Two other hostages were wounded.
- The original Broadway production of Stephen Sondheim's musical A Little Night Music closed after 601 performances.
- British long-distance runner Brendan Foster broke the world record for the 3,000 meter race, completing the distance in 7 minutes, 35.2 seconds and besting the mark of 7:37.6 that had been set in 1972 by Emiel Puttemans of Belgium. Foster, an employee of the city of Gateshead, Tyne and Wear, set the new record at the "Gateshead Games" that he had helped organize to call attention to the town's new stadium.
- The American Theatre Critics Association (ATCA) was founded at a meeting at the Eugene O'Neill Theater Center in Waterford, Connecticut.
- Born:
  - Jenny Beck, American TV actress known as the co-star of Guns of Paradise; in Los Angeles, California
  - Odelín Molina, Cuban footballer and goalkeeper with 122 caps for the Cuba national football team; in Santa Clara, Cuba
  - Laura Termini, Venezuelan actress and writer known for the Telemundo telenovela Guadalupe; in Caracas
  - Igor Yanovsky, Russian footballer with 32 caps for the Russia national team; in Ordzhonikidze, Soviet Union
  - Michael Gray, English footballer with three caps for the England national team; in City of Sunderland
  - Pepe Gálvez (José Gálvez Estévez), Spanish footballer and manager; in Calvià, Mallorca, Balearic Islands
  - García Pimienta (born Francisco Javier García Pimienta), Spanish footballer and manager; in Barcelona
- Died:
  - Edna Murphy, 74, American silent film and film serial actress
  - Joaquim Amat-Piniella, 60, Catalan writer known for the Spanish novel K.L. Reich
  - Fred Gómez Carrasco, 34, American criminal, shot himself, bringing an end to the Huntsville Prison siege.
  - Almira Sessions, 85, American character actress in over 500 films and TV shows

== August 4, 1974 (Sunday) ==
- A bomb exploded on the Italicus Express train between Italy and West Germany, killing 12 people and injuring 48. Italian neo-fascists claimed responsibility.
- The West African nation of Ghana began requiring its 80,000 motorists, as well as other vehicle operators, to drive on the right-hand side of the road after decades of left-hand side driving that dated from Ghana's days as a British colony. On the day before, the government banned the sale of alcohol for nine hours in order to ensure sobriety of vehicle operators after midnight.
- The derailment of an express train in Dol-de-Bretagne, France, killed nine people and injured 30.
- Swiss driver Clay Regazzoni won the 1974 German Grand Prix at the Nürburgring.
- French Army Commandant Pierre Galopin, posted in Chad, was captured by Chadian rebels in the Sahara desert, after traveling to the rebel-held portion of the African nation to negotiate the release of hostages. Galopin would be sentenced to death by his captors and executed by hanging on April 4, 1975.
- Bob Pleso, a stunt motorcyclist attempting to break the distance record of 171 feet (52 m) (set by Bob Gill rather than Evel Knievel) in jumping over parked automobiles, was fatally injured in front of 3,000 spectators while trying to jump over 30 cars at the Phenix Dragway in Phenix City, Alabama. Pleso's motorcycle cleared the first 27 cars before coming down on the windshield of the 28th, and he died in a hospital two hours later.

== August 5, 1974 (Monday) ==
- U.S. president Richard Nixon released transcripts of three conversations between himself and the former White House Chief of Staff, H. R. Haldeman, on June 23, 1972, six days after the Watergate break-in. One of the transcripts showed that Nixon had ordered that the Federal Bureau of Investigation halt its inquiry into the case.
- Nixon also released a statement saying that after he listened to the June 23 conversations, "Although I recognized that these presented potential problems, I did not inform my staff or my counsel of it... This was a serious act of omission for which I take full responsibility and which I deeply regret." He added that "a House vote on impeachment is, as a practical matter, virtually a foregone conclusion, and that the issue will therefore go to trial in the Senate."
- Many of President Nixon's strongest supporters in Congress withdrew their support after the transcripts' release, including Representative Charles E. Wiggins of California, Nixon's most prominent defender on the House Judiciary Committee, who said he would now vote for impeachment on the charge of obstruction of justice.
- At 10:24 in the morning, the roof of a U.S. government office building in downtown Miami, Florida, collapsed, killing 7 employees of the U.S. Drug Enforcement Administration and injuring 15 others. An inspection would later conclude that materials used in resurfacing of a parking lot on top of the building, as well as salt and sand, had eroded and weakened the supporting steel structure.
- The comic strip Tank McNamara, created by Jeff Millar and Bill Hinds, made its debut with distribution by United Press Syndicate. Billed as a satire on the American obsession with organized sports, the strip commented on the sports world through its title character, a former pro football player who had become a TV sports newscaster.
- The sport of dogs catching flying discs (including the Wham-O Frisbee) gained national exposure in the U.S. when a 19-year-old college student brought his dog, Ashley Whippet, onto the field at Dodger Stadium for an unauthorized interruption of a nationally televised baseball game between the Los Angeles Dodgers and the visiting Cincinnati Reds. Prior to the start of the ninth inning a crowd of 51,062 fans and millions of NBC viewers watched the whippet dog catch four out of five tosses with high leaps; the Dodgers won, 6 to 3.
- Born:
  - Kajol Devgan (born Kajol Mukherjee), Indian film star with six Filmfare Awards for best actress; in Bombay
  - Roman Berezovsky, Armenian footballer with 94 caps as the goalkeeper for the Armenia national team; in Yerevan, Armenian SSR, Soviet Union

== August 6, 1974 (Tuesday) ==
- For the first, and only, time in Australian history, the two houses of the Parliament of Australia convened as a combined 187-member body. All 127 members of the House of Representatives and all 60 Australian Senators participated in a two-day session inside the chambers of the House to debate and vote on six bills. The first legislation passed was the "one vote, one value" reform (96 for, 91 against) followed by an act to give representation in the Senate for the Australian Capital Territory and for the Northern Territory (97 for, 90 against).
- The bombing of a terminal at Los Angeles International Airport killed three people and injured 36. The time bomb had been placed in a locker by Yugoslavian-born American terrorist Muharem Kurbegovic and exploded at 8:10 in the morning.
- Robert C. Berger died at the age of 46 during an attempt to make the first crossing of the Atlantic Ocean in a balloon. An hour after Berger took off from Lakehurst Naval Air Station, his helium balloon disintegrated over Barnegat Bay in the U.S. state of New Jersey. Berger had reportedly never flown in a balloon before.
- A tank car filled with ammonium nitrate exploded in a railroad yard near Wenatchee, Washington, killing two people and injuring over 60.
- Born:
  - Olivier Dubois, French journalist on Malian affairs, known for being held hostage from 2021 to 2023; in Créteil, Val-de-Marne département
  - Ever Carradine, American TV actress; in Los Angeles
- Died:
  - Gene Ammons, 49, American jazz tenor saxophonist, died of bone cancer.
  - Henry Jacques Gaisman, 104, American philanthropist and inventor
  - Emma Fordyce MacRae, 87, American representational painter and one of the Philadelphia Ten
  - Robert Rounseville, 60, American stage actor and tenor, died of a heart attack while teaching a class.

== August 7, 1974 (Wednesday) ==
- French high-wire artist Philippe Petit conducted an unauthorized walk on a tightrope between the Twin Towers of the World Trade Center in New York City, crossing a 131-foot (40 m) cable at a height of 1,350 feet (410 m). Members of the Port Authority of New York and New Jersey Police Department arrested Petit for disorderly conduct and criminal trespass, but Richard Kuh, the New York County District Attorney, ordered the charges dropped in exchange for Petit giving a free performance for the children of New York City. Kuh suggested at a news conference that Port Authority security was insufficiently "keen".
- Alfonso López Michelsen was sworn into office for a four-year term as the 24th President of Colombia, succeeding Misael Pastrana Borrero.
- United Artists released the neo-Western film Bring Me the Head of Alfredo Garcia, directed by Sam Peckinpah.
- Born:
  - Andy Priaulx, British racing driver and winner of the World Touring Car Championship in 2005, 2006 and 2007; in St. Peter Port, Guernsey
  - Michael Shannon, American film actor known for Revolutionary Road and Nocturnal Animals; in Lexington, Kentucky
  - Deon Dreyer, South African recreational scuba diver who disappeared during a dive in Bushman's Hole in December 1994. Diver Dave Shaw died on a dive to recover Dreyer's body in 2005.
- Died:
  - Virginia Apgar, 65, American physician, inventor of the Apgar score, died of cirrhosis.
  - Rosario Castellanos, 49, Mexican poet, author, and diplomat, Mexican Ambassador to Israel, died from an electric shock in her home.
  - Richard Corts, 69, German Olympic sprinter and silver medalist in the 4 x 100m relay in 1928, committed suicide.

== August 8, 1974 (Thursday) ==
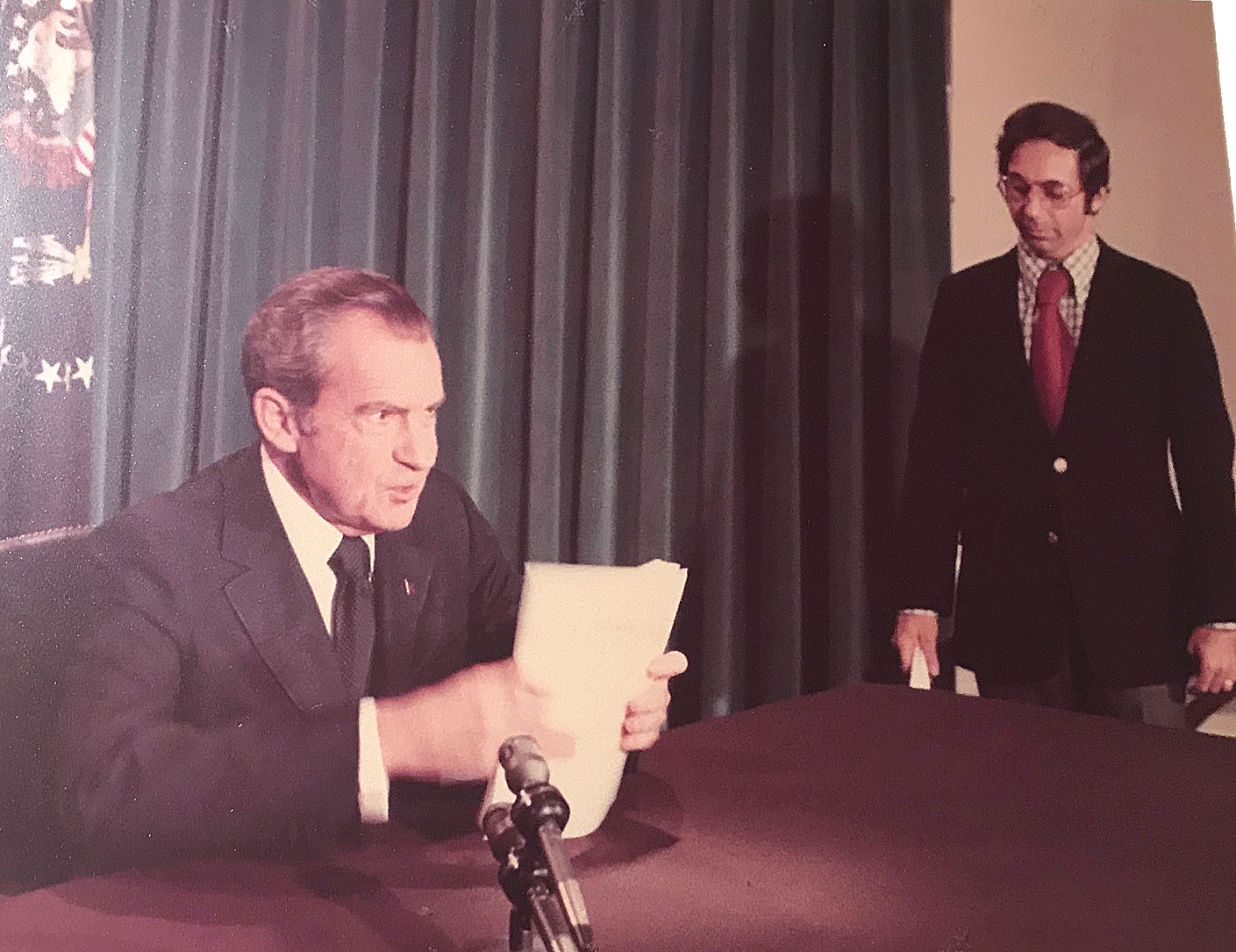
Nixon's resignation speech

- Richard Nixon became the first (and, as of 2025, the only) U.S. president to announce his resignation. Earlier in the week, Nixon had admitted his coverup of the Watergate scandal. In a televised address to the nation, Nixon said, "I have never been a quitter. To leave office before my term is completed is opposed to every instinct in my body. But as President I must put the interests of America first." He added that continuing to fight "would almost totally absorb the time and attention of both the President and the Congress... when our entire focus should be on the great issues of peace abroad and prosperity without inflation at home. Therefore, I shall resign the Presidency effective at noon tomorrow. Vice President Ford will be sworn in as President at that hour in this office."
- A team of Japanese and American climbers discovered the bodies of 7 members of an 8-woman team of Soviet climbers, led by Elvira Shatayeva, which had reached the summit of Lenin Peak, the third-tallest mountain in the Soviet Union, on August 5. The eighth woman was believed to have been swept off the mountain by high winds.
- Born: Rubén Beloki, Spanish Basque pelota (jai alai) star; in Burlada
- Died:
  - Baldur von Schirach, 67, Nazi German politician who led the Hitler Youth, and served 21 years in prison for war crimes after World War II.
  - Howie Pollet, 53, American Major League Baseball pitcher who had the best ERA and most games won in the 1946 National League season, died of adenocarcinoma.
  - Elisabeth Abegg, 92, German resistance fighter who provided shelter to 80 Jews during the Holocaust.
  - Henry King, 68, American orchestra leader for the Burns and Allen radio show.
  - David Dodge, 63, American novelist

== August 9, 1974 (Friday) ==
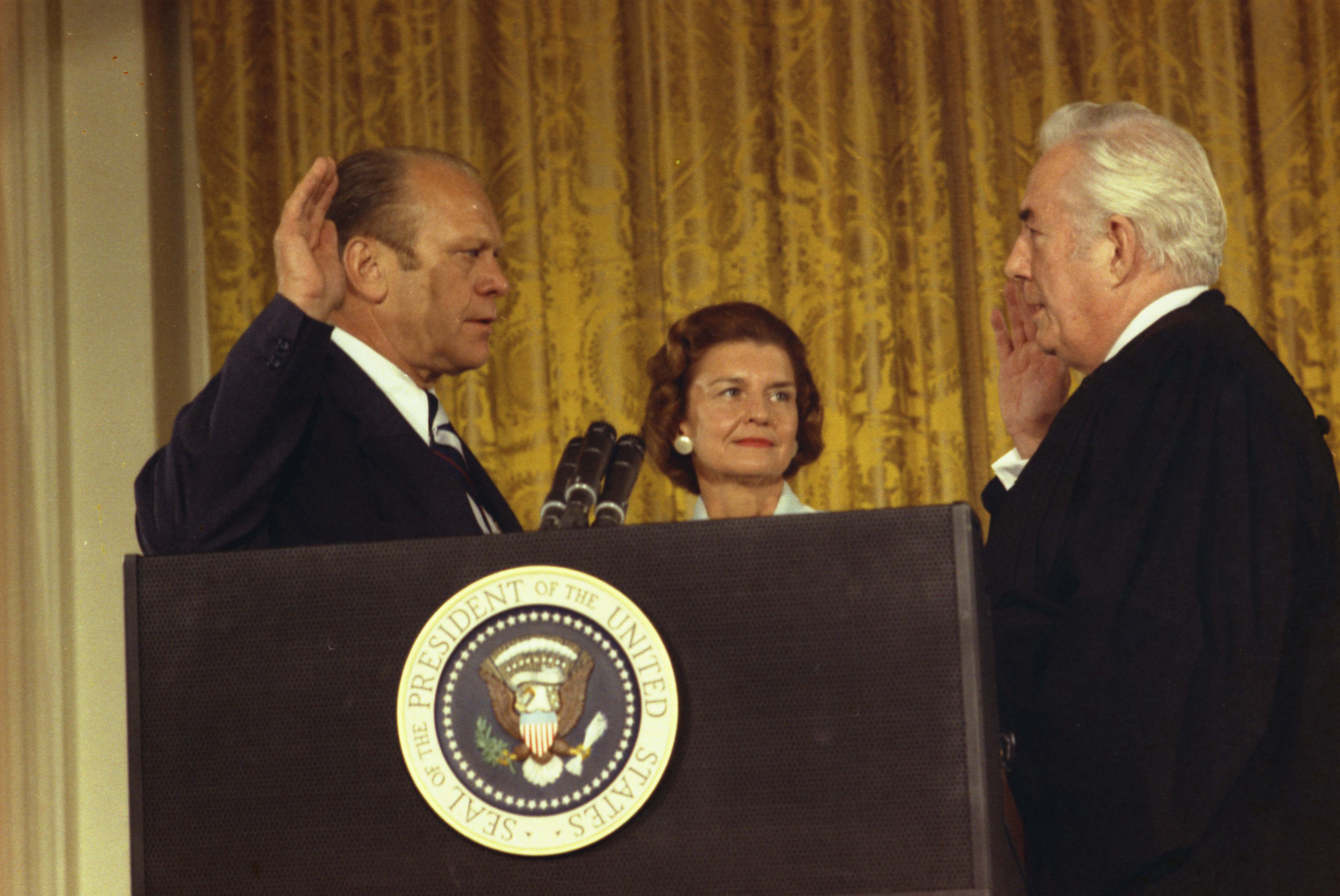
Chief Justice Warren Burger swears in Gerald Ford as President of the United States

- U.S. Vice President Gerald Ford was sworn in as the 38th President of the United States upon Nixon's resignation. In a speech after being sworn in, President Ford said, "My fellow Americans, our long national nightmare is over."
- All nine people on a United Nations peacekeeping force were killed when their Canadian Armed Forces airplane was shot down by missiles fired from a Syrian airbase. Buffalo 461, a de Havilland Canada DHC-5 Buffalo transport, was making a supply trip for UN forces enforcing the ceasefire to the war between Israel and Syria, and had been cleared for a landing by the control tower at the Damascus airport, but was hit by a surface-to-air missile as it passed over the Syrian town of Ad Dimas.
- A small plane crashed about 2.5 miles (4.0 km) northeast of Jackson, Minnesota, killing all six people on board, four members of the rock-jazz group Chase and the plane's pilot and co-pilot.
- Died:
  - Bill Chase, 39, American musician, was killed in a plane crash along with three other members of his band and the pilot and co-pilot of the Piper Twin Comanche.
  - Edgar F. Luckenbach Jr., 49, president and board chairman of Luckenbach Steamship Company, son of Edgar F. Luckenbach

== August 10, 1974 (Saturday) ==
- Eenadu, the highest-circulation Telugu-language newspaper in the world, was launched in India by publisher Ramoji Rao.
- Twelve people died and 14 were injured in a collision between a bus and a train in Calumpit, Bulacan, Philippines.
- U.S. President Gerald Ford requested that all members of President Nixon's Cabinet and all heads of U.S. Government agencies remain in office for "continuity and stability."

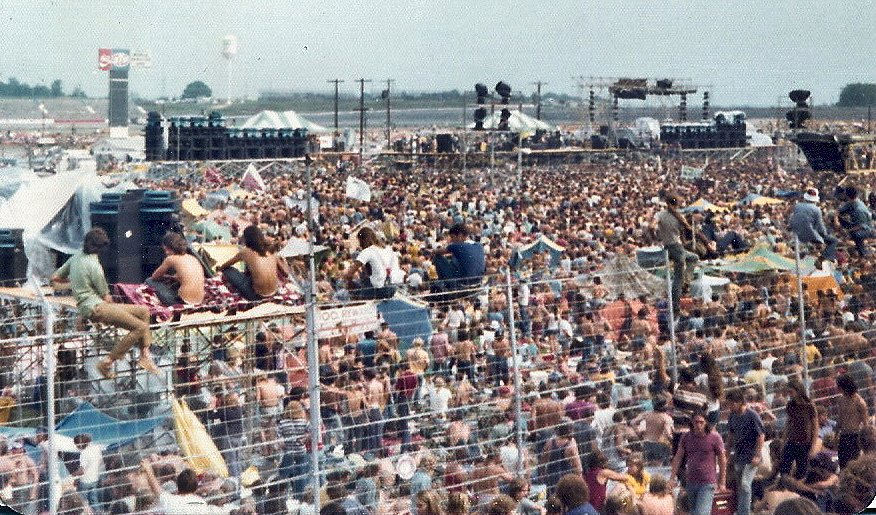
August Jam

- Over 300,000 people attended the August Jam outdoor rock concert at Charlotte Motor Speedway in North Carolina. The Allman Brothers Band and Emerson, Lake & Palmer were among the performers at the event.
- In West Branch, Iowa, the hometown of former U.S. president Herbert Hoover, nearly 7,000 people gathered to celebrate the 100th anniversary of his birth. President Nixon had been scheduled to attend prior to the events of the week leading to his resignation.
- Physician L. Michael Kuhn, a hemophilia specialist from Plainfield, New Jersey, his wife and their six children were killed in the crash of their Piper Aztec airplane 1,000 feet (300 m) short of the runway at the Fergus Falls Municipal Airport in Minnesota.
- Died:
  - José Miró Cardona, 71, who served briefly as Prime Minister of Cuba in 1959 after the victory of Fidel Castro in the Cuban Revolution, then stepped aside for Castro.
  - Theodore McKeldin, 73, U.S. politician, Governor of Maryland 1951 to 1959, Mayor of Baltimore 1943–1947 and 1963-1967.
  - Albert Parker, 87, American actor and film director known for Sherlock Holmes, The Black Pirate, and The Love of Sunya, later a talent agent in the UK
  - Ivor Dean, 56, British stage, film and television actor known for the British TV series The Saint
  - Chuck Hall, 56, the first Mayor of Miami-Dade County, Florida, metropolitan area (1964 to 1970), and Mayor of Miami Beach since 1971, died of a heart attack.

== August 11, 1974 (Sunday) ==
- An Air Mali Ilyushin Il-18V turboprop airliner crashed and killed 47 of the 60 people on board when it ran out of fuel because of a navigational error. The aircraft, which was taking Muslim pilgrims to Mecca, went down near Linonghin, about 25 miles (40 km) east of Ouagadougou, Upper Volta. The plane crashed during an attempted emergency landing on the highway between Niamey and Ouagadougou. 13 people survived.
- A collision between two buses on the Ankara-Istanbul highway near Bolu, Turkey, killed 21 people and injured 41.
- In front of an audience of 20,000 at an air show in northern Japan, 23-year-old skydiver Nobutaka Yoshinoya fell 1 mile (1.6 km) to his death after his parachute struck the parachute of another skydiver and failed to open properly.
- At Patricia Nixon Historical Park in Cerritos, California, former First Lady Pat Nixon's childhood home was firebombed, causing $2,000 in damage. The home would be destroyed by fire in 1978.
- Born: Audrey Mestre, French world-record setting freediver who set a women's record of descending to 130 metres (430 ft) on one breath of air in 1999, but later died while trying to break the absolute world record of 160 metres (520 ft); in Saint-Denis, Seine-Saint-Denis (d. 2002)
- Died:
  - José Falcón (born José Carlos Frita Falcão), 29, Portuguese matador, was killed in the ring during a bullfight in Barcelona, Spain.
  - Christian Fouchet, 63, French politician who was the last colonial governor of French Algeria before independence in 1962, died of a heart attack.
  - Maria Petrovna Maksakova, 72, Soviet Russian opera mezzo-soprano who appeared with the Bolshoi Theatre
  - Jan Tschichold, 72, German-born typographer and graphic designer, creator of the Sabon typeface
  - Compton Bennett, 74, English film director known for The Seventh Veil

== August 12, 1974 (Monday) ==
- In Uganda, physician Peter Mbalu Mukasa died of poisoning. Police discovered the dismembered body of Kay Adroa, a former wife of President Idi Amin, in the trunk of a car belonging to Mukasa. Adroa's autopsy showed she had died from bleeding after an incomplete abortion. Mukasa's death was ruled a suicide.
- All 27 people aboard Avianca Flight 610 were killed when the Piper DC-3 airliner flew into the side of Trujillo Mountain in Colombia at an altitude of 9,670 feet (2,950 m). The plane was on a flight from Tumaco to Cali, and its wreckage would not be discovered until October 31.
- Four mountain climbers died in the Alps in two separate incidents. Two Austrians fell while climbing the Matterhorn, while two West Germans fell on the Rimpfischhorn.
- 20th Century Fox released the road movie Harry and Tonto, starring Art Carney and directed by Paul Mazursky.

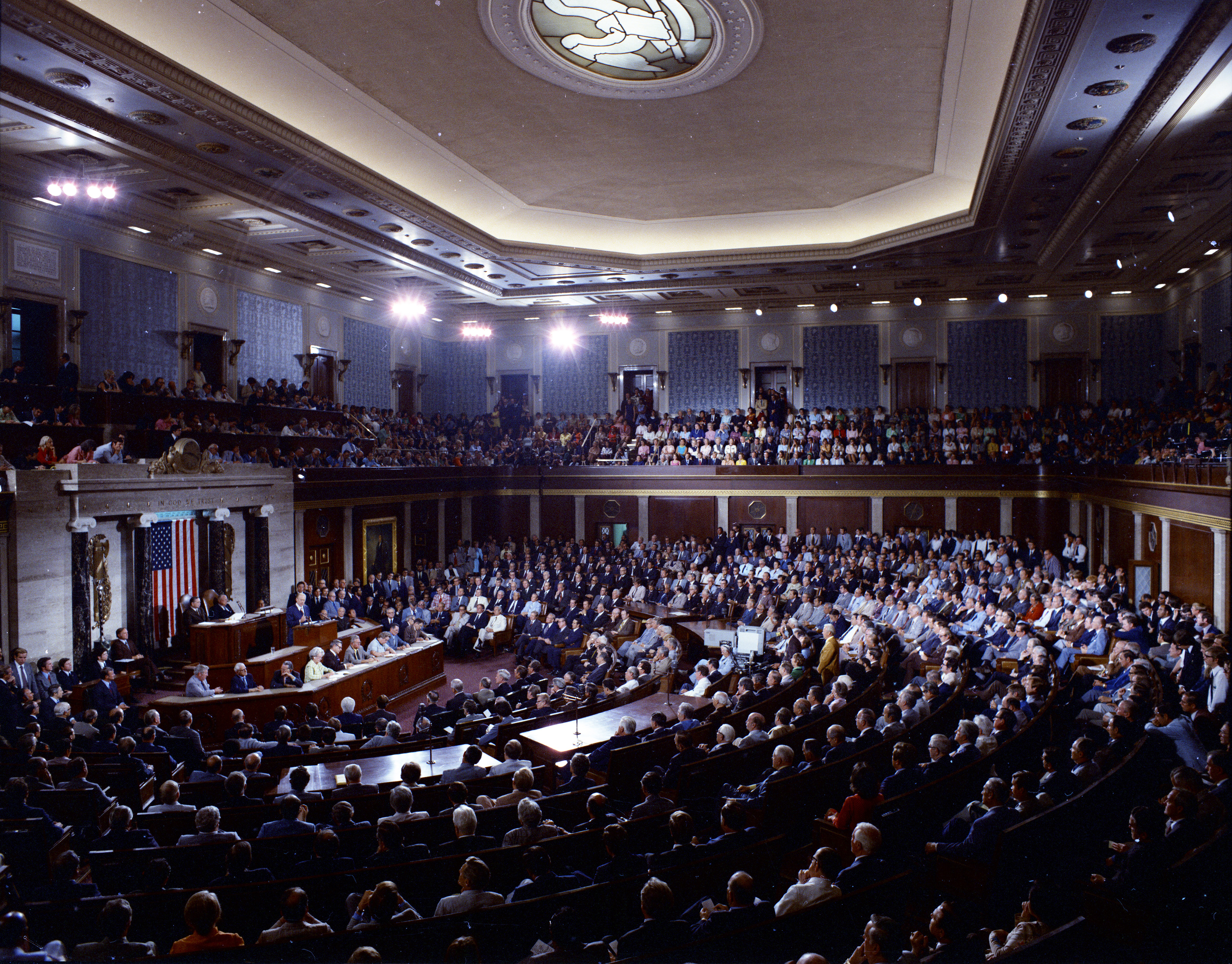
President Ford addresses Congress in the United States House chamber

- During a televised address to a joint session of the United States Congress, U.S. President Ford said, "To the limits of my strength and ability, I will be the President of the black, brown, red and white Americans, of old and young, of women's liberationists and male chauvinists and all the rest of us in between, of the poor and the rich, of native sons and new refugees, of those who work at lathes or at desks or in mines or in the fields, and of Christians, Jews, Moslems, Buddhists and atheists, if there really are any atheists after what we have all been through."
- Born: Trent Keegan, New Zealand investigative journalist who was murdered while working on a report in Kenya; in New Plymouth (killed 2008)

== August 13, 1974 (Tuesday) ==
- On the second day of principal photography for the film The Eiger Sanction, directed by and starring Clint Eastwood, a falling rock on the north face of the Eiger killed 26-year-old British climber David Knowles and injured climbing advisor and cameraman Mike Hoover.
- A head-on collision between a bus and a fruit truck near Zaragoza, Spain, killed 9 people and injured 20.
- Born:
  - Karine Jean-Pierre, Martinique-born American campaign manager and political analyst who became the White House Press Secretary for U.S. president Joe Biden in 2022; in Fort-de-France.
  - Nassima al-Sadah, Saudi Arabian Shia human rights writer and activist
  - Niklas Sundin, Swedish death metal guitarist for the band Dark Tranquillity; in Gothenburg
- Died: Kate O'Brien, 76, Irish novelist and playwright

== August 14, 1974 (Wednesday) ==
- Turkey invaded Cyprus for the second time, eventually occupying 37% of the island's territory, and dividing the Cypriot capital of Nicosia.
- Greece withdrew its forces from NATO's military command structure, as a result of the Turkish invasion of Cyprus.
- In retaliation for the Turkish invasion, the Greek Cypriot paramilitary group EOKA B invaded the Turkish Cypriot village of Tochni (in southern Cyprus) and kidnapped and murdered 84 men and boys. On the same day, EOKA-B murdered 126 men, women and children whom it had taken hostage on July 20 from the northern Cyprus villages of Maratha, Santalaris and Aloda.
- All 50 people aboard an Aeropostal Airlines flight in Venezuela were killed when the airliner crashed into a hill during a storm. The Vickers Viscount turboprop had departed from Cumaná and was on a 34 miles (55 km) hop to Margarita Island and the resort of Porlamar. The plane's co-pilot initially survived the crash but died 17 days later.
- In Japan, the East Asia Anti-Japan Armed Front (EAAJAF) attempted to assassinate the Emperor Hirohito, preparing to explode a bomb underneath a railway bridge where the royal train was scheduled to cross. The plan was aborted after an EAAJAF member was spotted by police. The terrorists would use the explosives to carry out the Mitsubishi building bombing on August 30.
- In Kansas City, Missouri, 15-year-old David Eyman was found bound at the wrists and knees and burned alive on the boundary road between Jackson and Cass counties. As of 2021 his murder remained unsolved.
- American motorcycle racer Rickie K. Milner, 22, was killed during a competition at the Corona Raceway in Corona, California. Milner spilled his motorcycle and was struck in the neck from behind by racer Bill Matherson's motorcycle.
- Born:
  - Christopher Gorham, American TV actor, co-star of Covert Affairs; in Fresno, California
  - Tomer Sisley (born Tomer Gazit), Israeli and French actor and comedian; to Israeli parents in West Berlin
  - Oleg Bakhmatyuk, Ukrainian businessman and founder, in 2011, of the agricultural company UkrLandFarming; in Ivano-Frankivsk, Ukrainian SSR, Soviet Union
- Died: Arnulf Klett, 69, West German politician and Oberbürgermeister (Mayor) of Stuttgart since 1945, died of a heart attack.

== August 15, 1974 (Thursday) ==
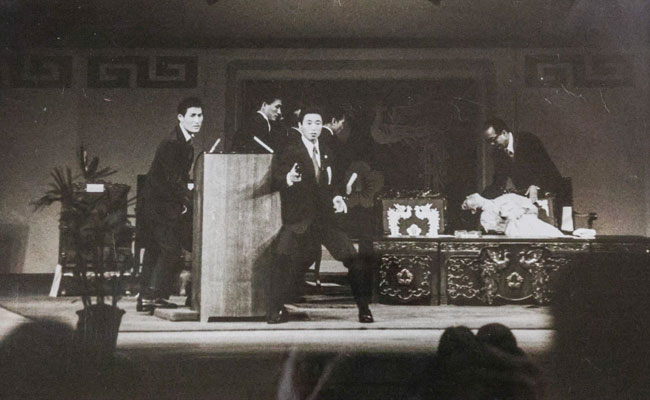
Attempted assassination of Park Chung Hee

- Yuk Young-soo, 48, the wife of South Korea's President Park Chung Hee, was fatally wounded during an attempt by a Japanese-born North Korean sympathizer, Mun Se-gwang, to assassinate President Park. The event occurred as the President was giving a speech at the National Theater of Korea in Seoul for National Liberation Day. During the gun battle that followed, a bullet fired by one of the president's guards ricocheted and killed Jang Bong-hwa, a member of a high school choir performing at the event. After the shooting and Mun's arrest, President Park resumed his address. President Park would be assassinated in 1979.
- The Toronto Zoo, with an area of 287 hectares (710 acres) and the largest in Canada, opened to the public.
- The British travel operator Court Line, and its subsidiaries Court Line Aviation, Clarksons Travel Group and Horizon Travel, ceased operations as the Court Line Group went bankrupt. More than 49,000 tourists were left stranded with no means of returning home from vacation, but would be rescued by Court Line's competitors who organized an airlift, at no additional cost to the tourists, through the Tour Operators' Study Group.
- False statements attributed to two Republican members of the U.S. House of Representatives appeared in the Congressional Record, the official record of U.S. Congress proceedings and debates. Representative Earl Landgrebe of Indiana, who had supported President Nixon during the Watergate scandal, was represented as recommending that President Ford appoint Nixon as vice president and then resign. Representative John M. Ashbrook of Ohio supposedly praised the military dictatorship of Chile. Both men denied making the statements and asked for them to be expunged from the permanent bound version of the Congressional Record.
- Born:
  - Natasha Henstridge, Canadian film and TV actress known as co-star of Maximum Risk and star of the TV series She Spies; in Springdale, Newfoundland and Labrador
  - Cao Yu, award-winning Chinese cinematographer known for Kekexili: Mountain Patrol and Legend of the Demon Cat; in Beijing
- Died:
  - Otto Braun (aka "Li De"), 73, German communist journalist, Comintern agent and military adviser to the Chinese Communist Party during the Chinese Civil War
  - Clay Shaw, 61, American businessman and CIA contact, the only person brought to trial for involvement in the assassination of John F. Kennedy, died of metastatic lung cancer. Shaw had been indicted and arrested in 1967 on the prosecution of New Orleans District Attorney Jim Garrison on charges of conspiracy, but acquitted by a jury.
  - Edmund Cobb, 82, American actor who appeared in 620 films during his 50-year career, primarily in westerns as a villain's henchman.

== August 16, 1974 (Friday) ==
- In Santo Domingo, Joaquín Balaguer was sworn in for his third consecutive term as President of the Dominican Republic. Bombs had exploded in the city during the previous night, and the country's main opposition parties called for a two-day curfew to protest the inauguration.
- Six people were killed and 2 were injured in an early morning fire at Moore's Rest Home, a nursing home in Brookhaven, Mississippi.

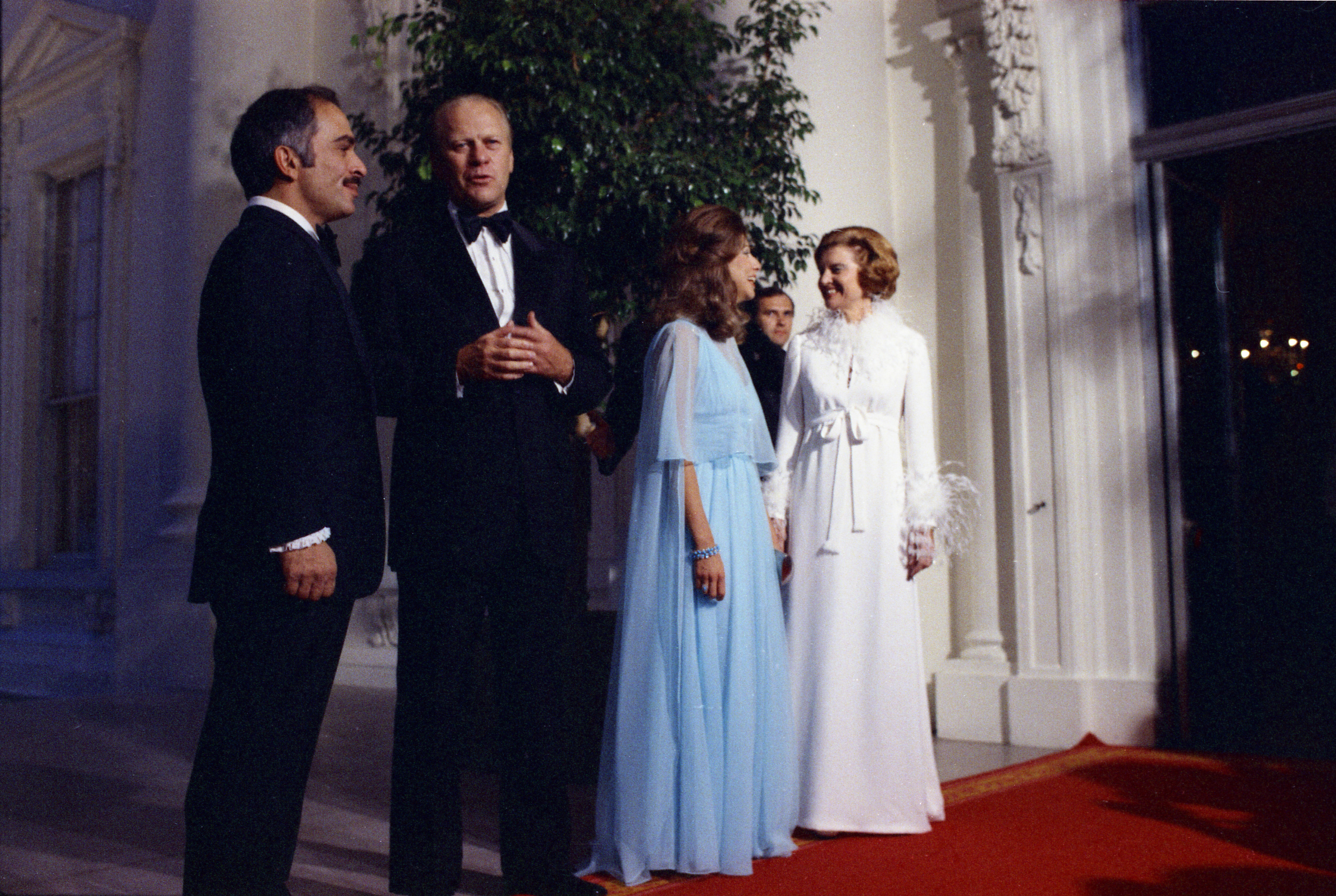
President and Mrs. Ford with the King and Queen of Jordan

- U.S. president Ford gave the first state dinner of his administration, hosting King Hussein and Queen Alia of Jordan at the White House.
- The Ramones made their first "professional" performance, debuting as the feature band at CBGB, a bar in New York's East Village that initially limited its music to "country, blue grass and blues" music but soon moved into punk rock and new wave music.
- Born:
  - Shivnarine Chanderpaul, Guyanese cricketer and coach who played for and was captain of the West Indies cricket team, with 204 caps in Test cricket and 66 caps in one-day internationals; in Unity Village
  - Krisztina Egerszegi, Hungarian swimmer, winner of five Olympic gold medals (1988, 1992 and 1996) with three in the 200m backstroke; in Budapest
  - Didier Cuche, Swiss Olympic alpine skier, 2009 World champion in the super giant slalom (super-G) competition; in Le Pâquier, Neuchâtel
- Died:
  - Karl Mundt, 74, U.S. senator for South Dakota 1948 to 1973, and U.S. representative 1939 to 1948
  - Adolph Murie, 74, American conservationist and wildlife biologist
  - Robert Cruickshank, 74, Scottish bacteriologist

== August 17, 1974 (Saturday) ==
- Fakhruddin Ali Ahmed was elected as the fifth President of India over rival candidate Tridib Chaudhuri in the electoral vote system used in India. In addition to all members of the two houses of the Parliament of India, members of the legislative assemblies of all states and union territories of India were allowed to cast votes. Of the 943,309 legislators who cast votes on election day, 754,113 voted in favor of Ahmed and 189,196 for Chaudhuri.
- Petronas (Petroliam Nasional), the government-owned oil and natural gas company of Malaysia, was incorporated.
- The championship game of the DFB-Pokal, the knockout game of West Germany's Bundesliga, was played before 52,800 spectators at the Rheinstadion in Düsseldorf. Eintracht Frankfurt, which had finished in 4th place in the regular season, defeated 12th-place Hamburger SV, 3 to 1 after extra time.
- Magnificat, a canticle composed by Krzysztof Penderecki for the 1,200th anniversary of Salzburg Cathedral, premiered at the cathedral, with the choirs conducted by Penderecki himself.
- Five mountain climbers, including professional guide Paul Luquin, died in a fall in the Meiji region of the French Alps.
- Died: Aldo Palazzeschi (pen name of Aldo Giurlani), 89, Italian novelist, poet, journalist and essayist

== August 18, 1974 (Sunday) ==
- Nineteen incarcerated members of the Provisional IRA escaped from Portlaoise Prison in County Laois in the Republic of Ireland. The prisoners, including Tom McFeely, overpowered guards, took uniforms, and then used gelignite to blow open the gates.
- The crash of a Zaire Air Force C-130 Hercules transport killed all 31 people on board near Kisangani.
- Argentinian driver Carlos Reutemann won the 1974 Austrian Grand Prix at the Österreichring.
- Died:
  - Laura Clifford Barney, 94, American Baháʼí teacher and philanthropist, officer of the Legion of Honour
  - Johnny Hathaway, 23, became the second jockey in 1974 to be fatally injured in a race. Hathaway died when his horse threw him into the path of another horse during a race at Waterford Park in West Virginia. Jockey Mike Tornambe had been killed in a race in February 1974.

== August 19, 1974 (Monday) ==
- Rodger Davies, 53, the United States Ambassador to Cyprus, was shot and killed while standing in the central hall of the U.S. Embassy in Nicosia during a demonstration outside the embassy by Greek Cypriots, angry over the Turkish invasion and division of the capital. A bullet fired from outside passed through the shuttered window of Davies' office and through another office before striking him in the chest. Antoinette Varnavas, an embassy secretary who was a Greek Cypriot national, was struck in the head by a bullet and killed after going to Davies' assistance. The shooters were believed to be gunmen from the Greek Cypriot paramilitary organisation EOKA B.
- After 10 days of the U.S. presidential residence being at the home of Gerald and Betty Ford at 514 Crown View Drive in Alexandria, Virginia, U.S. president Gerald R. Ford and his family moved into the White House at 1600 Pennsylvania Avenue in Washington, D.C. During his first ten days as president, Ford had been driven to and from his office at the White House, along with his Secret Service escorts and with help from the Alexandria police.
- A bomb threat forced American musician Ray Charles to cut short a performance at the Schaefer Music Festival in Central Park after only four songs. No bomb was discovered. Charles would return to Central Park to fulfill his engagement on September 2.
- Born: Sergey Ryzhikov, Russian cosmonaut who served on two missions aboard the International Space Station for 173 days in 2016 and 2017 (ISS Expedition 49) and for 184 days in 2020 and 2021 (ISS Expedition 63); in Bugulma, Tatar ASSR, Russian SFSR, Soviet Union
- Died: David Bamberg, 70, British stage magician and illusionist

== August 20, 1974 (Tuesday) ==
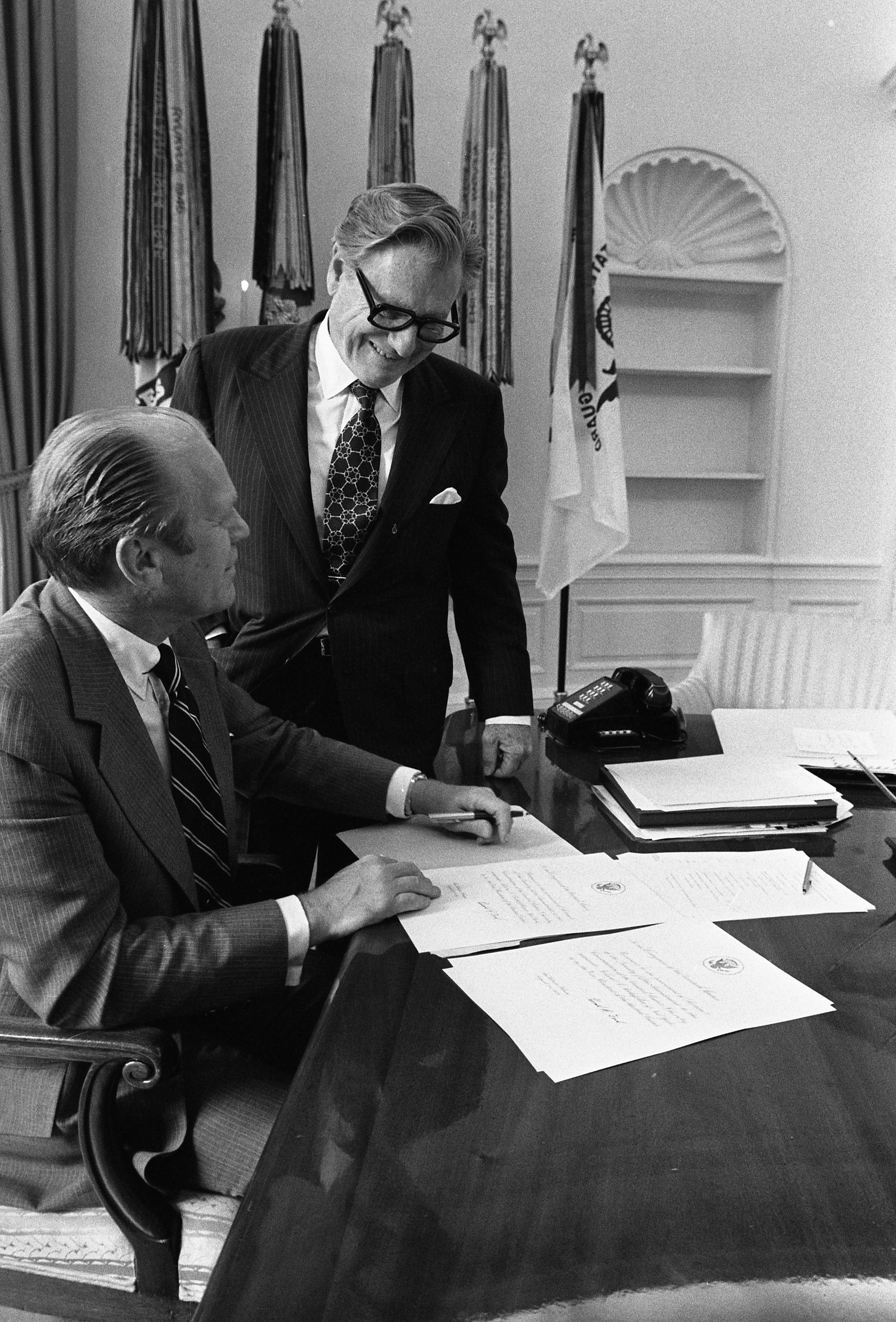
Gerald Ford and Nelson Rockefeller in the Oval Office

- U.S. president Gerald Ford nominated Nelson Rockefeller, the former governor of New York, to be Vice President of the United States. Rockefeller was selected despite a poll of Republican leaders showing a preference for Republican National Committee chairman George H. W. Bush. In compensation, Ford offered Bush the chance to be a major U.S. diplomat and Bush asked to be the first representative to Communist China. The U.S. Senate and the House of Representatives would confirm Rockefeller in December.
- President Ford also nominated former child actress Shirley Temple Black as United States Ambassador to Ghana.
- Spain announced that a referendum on self-determination for the Spanish Sahara would be held in the first six months of 1975. In response, Morocco, which claimed the same area, announced that they would take the issue to the International Court of Justice, and Spain would postpone the referendum in December.
- In the deciding game of the European ice hockey championship, HC CSKA Moscow, champions of the Soviet Union on a team composed of members of the Soviet Army, defeated the champions of Sweden, Brynäs IF, located in Gävle. After losing the first game, 2 to 6, on November 20, Brynäs needed to win by 7 or more points in the second game, but CSKA Moscow won, 12 to 2, for an aggregate of 18 to 4.
- Born:
  - Amy Adams, American film actress known for Enchanted, Man of Steel and Arrival; winner of two consecutive Golden Globe Awards for Best Actress (for American Hustle (2014) and Big Eyes (2015)); in Vicenza, Italy, where her father was stationed at the U.S. Army's Caserma Ederle base.
  - Maxim Vengerov, Russian-Israeli violinist; in Novosibirsk, Russian Soviet Federative Socialist Republic, Soviet Union
  - Misha Collins (stage name for Dmitri Tippens Krushnic), American actor known for Supernatural; in Boston
- Died:
  - Ilona Massey (stage name for Ilona Hajmássy), 64, Hungarian-born U.S. film, stage, and radio actress, died of cancer. She was known for the films Love Happy and Frankenstein Meets the Wolf Man and for the DuMont Network variety program, The Ilona Massey Show, in 1954.
  - Magda Sonja (born Věnceslava Johana Veselá), 88, Austrian film actress
  - Mort Lloyd, 43, the Democratic nominee for the U.S. Congress in the 3rd Congressional District of Tennessee, was killed when his light plane crashed, three weeks after he won the Democratic primary. Lloyd, a newscaster for a Chattanooga TV station, was flying to visit his parents in Shelbyville when the aircraft lost part of its propeller. Lloyd's widow, Marilyn Lloyd, would be named to replace him on the ballot, and would go on to serve ten terms in the U.S. House of Representatives from 1975 to 1995.
  - Dr. Latunde Odeku, 47, Nigerian neurosurgeon and the first neurosurgeon in West Africa
  - Tio Ie Soei, 84, Indonesian novelist who wrote under the pen name Tjoa Pit Bak
  - W. D. Jones, 58, former member of the Barrow Gang and associate of Bonnie and Clyde during 1933, was shot and killed by a friend with whom he had gotten into an argument.

== August 21, 1974 (Wednesday) ==
- The Singapore-registered freighter Toulouse sank east of Taiwan, taking with it 31 of its crewmen. Only three of the 34 crew were rescued.
- The Treaty of Jeddah was signed between King Faisal of Saudi Arabia and Zayed bin Sultan Al Nahyan, President of the United Arab Emirates (UAE), with the UAE ceding territory along the two nations' borders, in return for diplomatic recognition from the Saudis.
- Paramount Pictures released the sports comedy film The Longest Yard, starring Burt Reynolds and directed by Robert Aldrich.
- The nude, strangled body of 23-year-old aspiring actress Karin Schlegel was discovered on the roof of a building in the Greenwich Village neighborhood of New York City. Music teacher Charles Yukl, who had pled guilty in 1968 to first-degree manslaughter in the strangulation death of another young woman and had been released on parole in 1973, would be arrested for Schlegel's murder on August 24. Yukl would plead guilty in 1976 and would hang himself in prison in 1982.

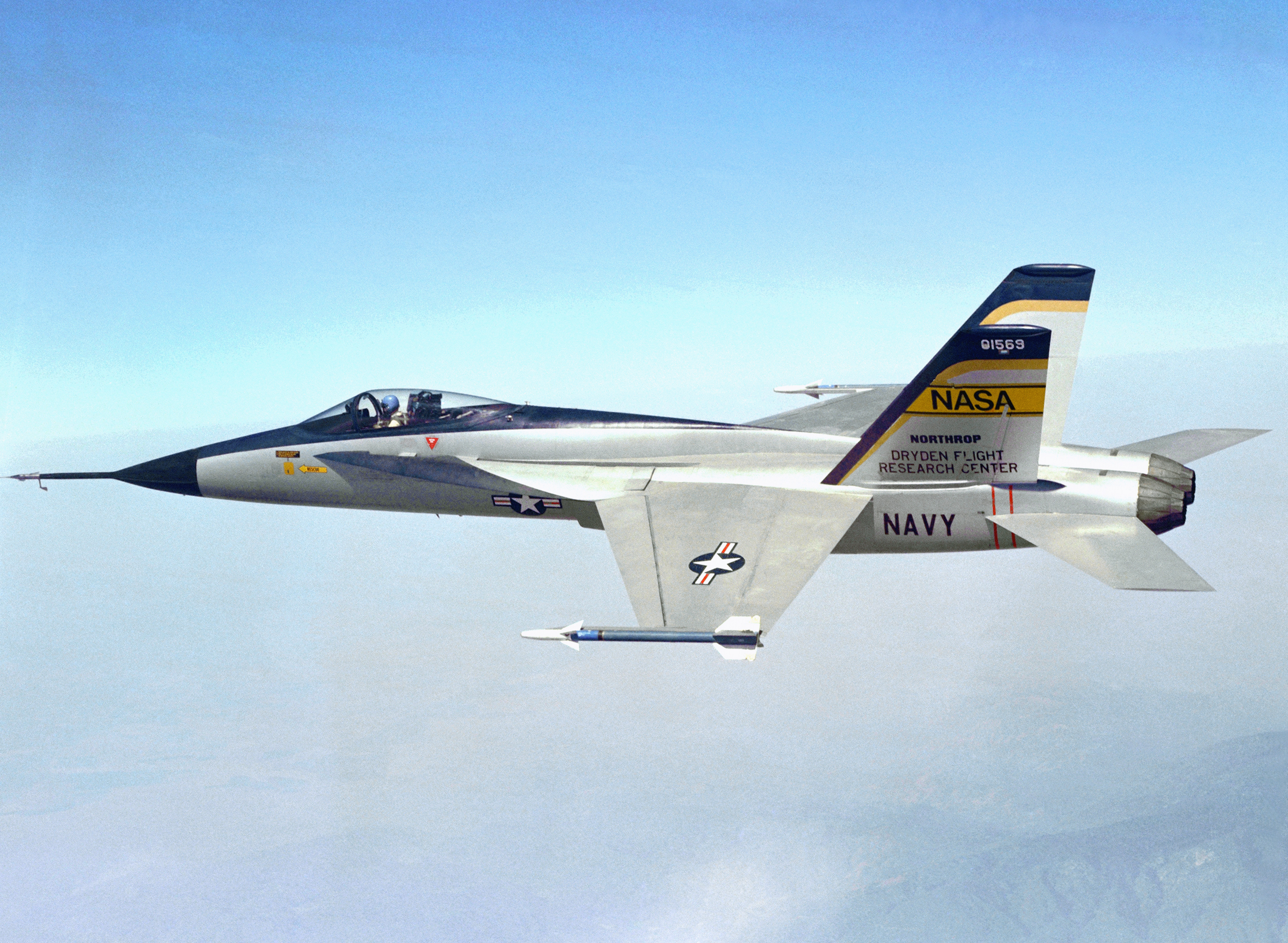
A Northrop YF-17 in 1976

- The second Northrop YF-17 prototype jet fighter aircraft (s/n 72-1570) made its test flight, departing from Edwards Air Force Base in the U.S. state of California. It reached an altitude of 27,000 feet (8,200 m) and a speed of 615 miles per hour (990 km/h). Only 2 of these fighter prototypes were built, the first (s/n 72-1569), flew 9 June 1974.

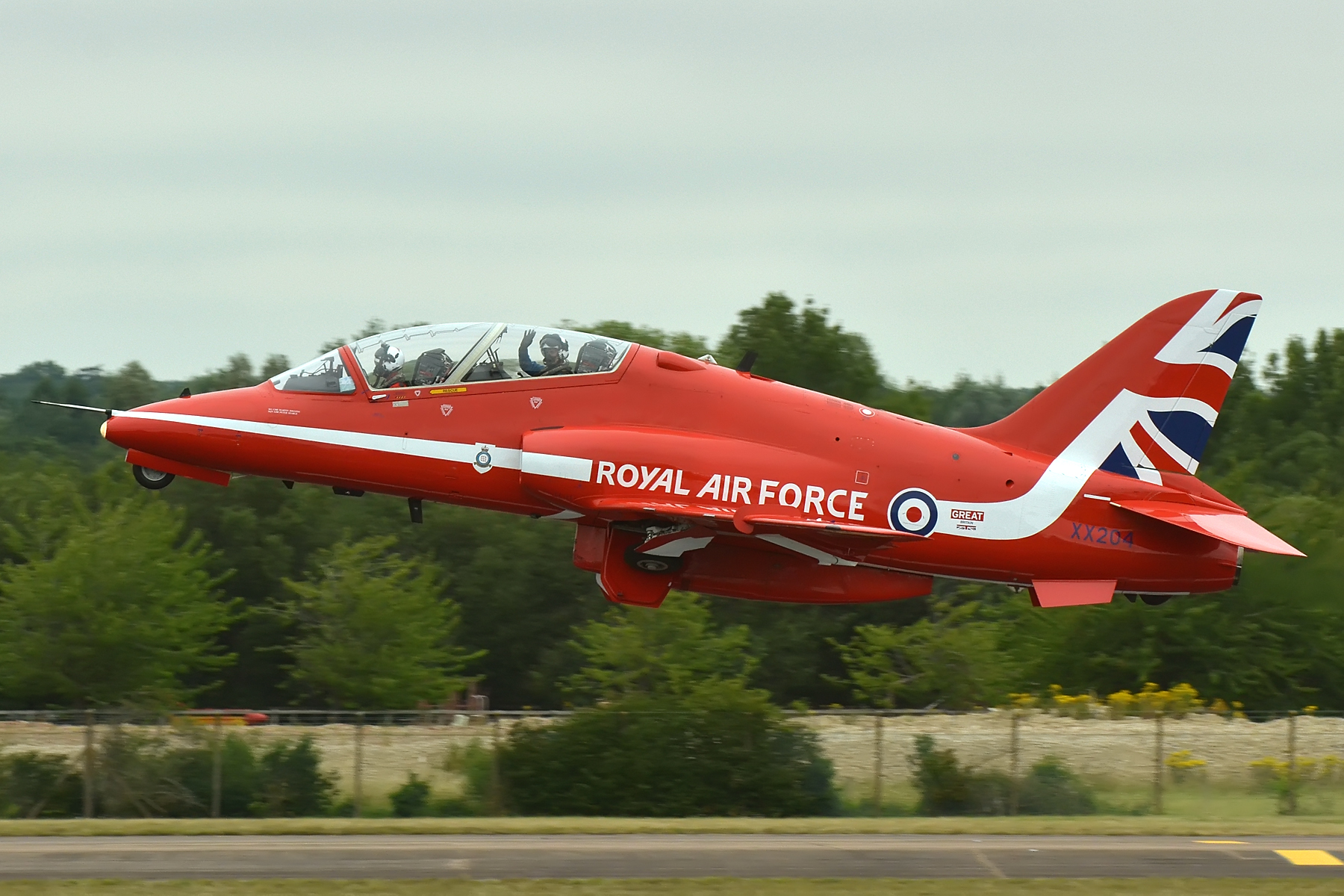
A Hawker Siddeley Hawk T1W

- The Hawker Siddeley Hawk T1 prototype jet trainer aircraft made its first test flight, departing from RAF Dunsfold in the UK. Piloted by Duncan Simpson, it reached an altitude of 20,000 feet (6,100 m).
- Died:
  - Buford Pusser, 36, former sheriff of McNairy County, Tennessee, subject of the Walking Tall series of films, was killed in an automobile accident hours after signing a contract to portray himself in a sequel to the 1973 film.
  - Haim Moussa Douek, 70, the last Chief Rabbi of Egypt from 1960 until his departure from Egypt in 1972, died of a heart attack in New York.
  - James P. Cannon, 84, U.S. political activist and the founder and first National Secretary of the Socialist Workers Party
  - Georgia Harkness, 83, American Methodist theologian and philosopher who won equal rights for women within the United Methodist Church in 1956.

== August 22, 1974 (Thursday) ==
- The Housing and Community Development Act of 1974 was signed into law by U.S. president Gerald Ford, after being approved in the Senate, 76 to 11, and by the House, 351 to 25. The law created the Community Development Block Grant (CDBG) for public housing authorities in the U.S. to spend on housing, public facilities, child care and economic development to fill local needs. In effect, as one historian noted, "the U.S. government got out of the construction business," with the housing authorities being allowed to distribute Housing Choice Vouchers to low-income families and "letting the tenants shop around the private market to find an apartment of their own choosing."
- For the first time, the International Monetary Fund (IMF) provided crude oil from its own storage facility to give aid to a developing country.
- The government of India ratified the nation's National Policy for Children to reduce poverty, with the objective of guaranteeing that "all children in the state get the necessary prenatal, postnatal and developmental care to ensure optimal health", to be accomplished by a comprehensive health program, funding for nutrition for women and children, free education for all children up to age 14, and prevention of the exploitation of child labor.
- During preliminary trials for the 1974 America's Cup, a television helicopter crashed into Rhode Island Sound 4 miles (6.4 km) east of Point Judith, Rhode Island, killing a technician and injuring a cameraman and the pilot.
- Died:
  - Alfredo Edmead, 17, Dominican minor league baseball player, died of a skull fracture and cerebral hemorrhage after an on-field collision with teammate Pablo Cruz while playing for the Salem Pirates in the Carolina League. Edmead remains the youngest professional baseball player ever to die on the field.
  - Sir Charles Wheeler KCVO CBE PRA, 82, English sculptor and president of the Royal Academy of Arts from 1956 to 1966
  - Robert Wilder, 73, American novelist, playwright and screenwriter known for Flamingo Road
  - Jacob Bronowski, 66, Polish-Jewish British mathematician, biologist and science historian, died of a heart attack.

== August 23, 1974 (Friday) ==
- South Korea's President Park Chung Hee rescinded two decrees that had authorized the arrest of dissidents. A January 8 emergency measure had prohibited all criticism or demands for a revision of the nation's constitution, while an April decree had prohibited student protests against the government, with penalties ranging from five years imprisonment up to execution. Still in place was another January 8 decree, permitting arrests without warrants, and establishing secret trials by court-martial for suspects.
- Two children were killed when a Cessna 172 single-engine plane crashed into their home at 403 Tioga Street in Catasauqua, Pennsylvania. The plane's pilot and his passenger were also killed moments after taking off in a pouring rain from the Slatington Airport, one mile from the house, at 3:15 in the morning.
- Former lightweight boxing contender Tommy Tibbs, 40, was shot during an argument at a cafe in Roxbury, Boston. He would die the following day at Boston City Hospital.
- Born:
  - Ray Park, Scottish film actor and martial artist known for portraying Darth Maul in Star Wars: Episode I – The Phantom Menace; in Glasgow
  - Shifty Shellshock (stage name of Seth Brooks Binzer), American singer for the rap rock band Crazy Town and the 2001 hit song Butterfly; in Los Angeles
- Died:
  - Roberto Assagioli, 86, Italian psychiatrist and pioneering psychologist known as the developer of psychosynthesis.
  - Antoine Marc Gaudin, 74, American metallurgist, researcher for the Manhattan Project

== August 24, 1974 (Saturday) ==
- Voting took place in the 1974 Malaysian general election for all 154 seats of the Dewan Rakyat, the lower house of Malaysia's parliament. The largest party of the Barisan Nasional alliance, the United Malays National Organisation (UMNO) of Prime Minister Abdul Razak Hussein, won 62 seats outright, 16 short of a majority, while the other nine parties of the Barisan won another 73 seats. The voting was peaceful, with no recurrence of the violence that had marred the 1969 election. Runoff elections, if necessary, were scheduled for September 14.
- Fakhruddin Ali Ahmed took office as the fifth President of India. Ahmed was the first Muslim to serve as president of the predominantly Hindu nation.
- Kevin Olsson, a 17-year-old Blackpool F.C. fan, became the first fan ever murdered inside an English football ground. Olsson was stabbed to death in the Bloomfield Road football stadium at Blackpool, Lancashire, where Blackpool was hosting Bolton Wanderers. A juvenile would be tried and acquitted of Olsson's murder. As of 2024, no one else had been charged.
- In Canada, Concordia University was created in Montreal by the merger of Loyola College and the newer Sir George Williams University.
- Polish racer Janusz Kowalski and French racer Geneviève Gambillon won the men's and women's amateur road races at the 1974 UCI Road World Championships in Montreal, Quebec, Canada.

The Johnson statue in 2014

- U.S. congressman J. J. Pickle and former first lady Lady Bird Johnson unveiled a larger-than-life-size bronze statue of Lyndon B. Johnson, carved by sculptor Jimilu Mason, at Lyndon B. Johnson State Park in Texas.
- Kent Roberts, a 44-year-old jockey, was killed during a race at Prescott Downs in Arizona.
- Born:
  - Jennifer Lien, American actress known for portraying the character "Kes" on the TV show Star Trek: Voyager; in Palos Heights, Illinois
  - Titus (gorilla), known as "The Gorilla King," silverback mountain gorilla of the Virunga Mountains (d. 2009, old age)
- Died: Alexander P. de Seversky, 80, Russian-born American aviation pioneer, inventor, and founder of the Seversky Aircraft Corporation

== August 25, 1974 (Sunday) ==
- A report from the New York Times News Service quoted unidentified White House sources as stating that "Defense Secretary James R. Schlesinger and the Joint Chiefs of Staff kept unusually close control over lines of command during the last days of the Nixon Administration to ensure that no unauthorized orders were given to military units by the White House," a story with "the clear implication being that the secretary of defense had helped avert a coup d'etat." President Ford would learn a year later that the source was Secretary Schlesinger himself, who admitted to the Undersecretary of Defense that he had invented the story during a lunch with reporters on August 23. Ford would fire Schlesinger a year later, on November 1, 1975, after commenting to aides, "For the Secretary of Defense to speculate to the press that our military commanders— men who are controlled by civilians under the Constitution— might take some unilateral and illegal action at a moment of grave national crisis was to stab our armed forces in the back."
- An early morning fire that killed 13 people broke out at 3:00 a.m. at the Washington House Hotel in Berkeley Springs, West Virginia. The blaze destroyed almost an entire block of buildings.
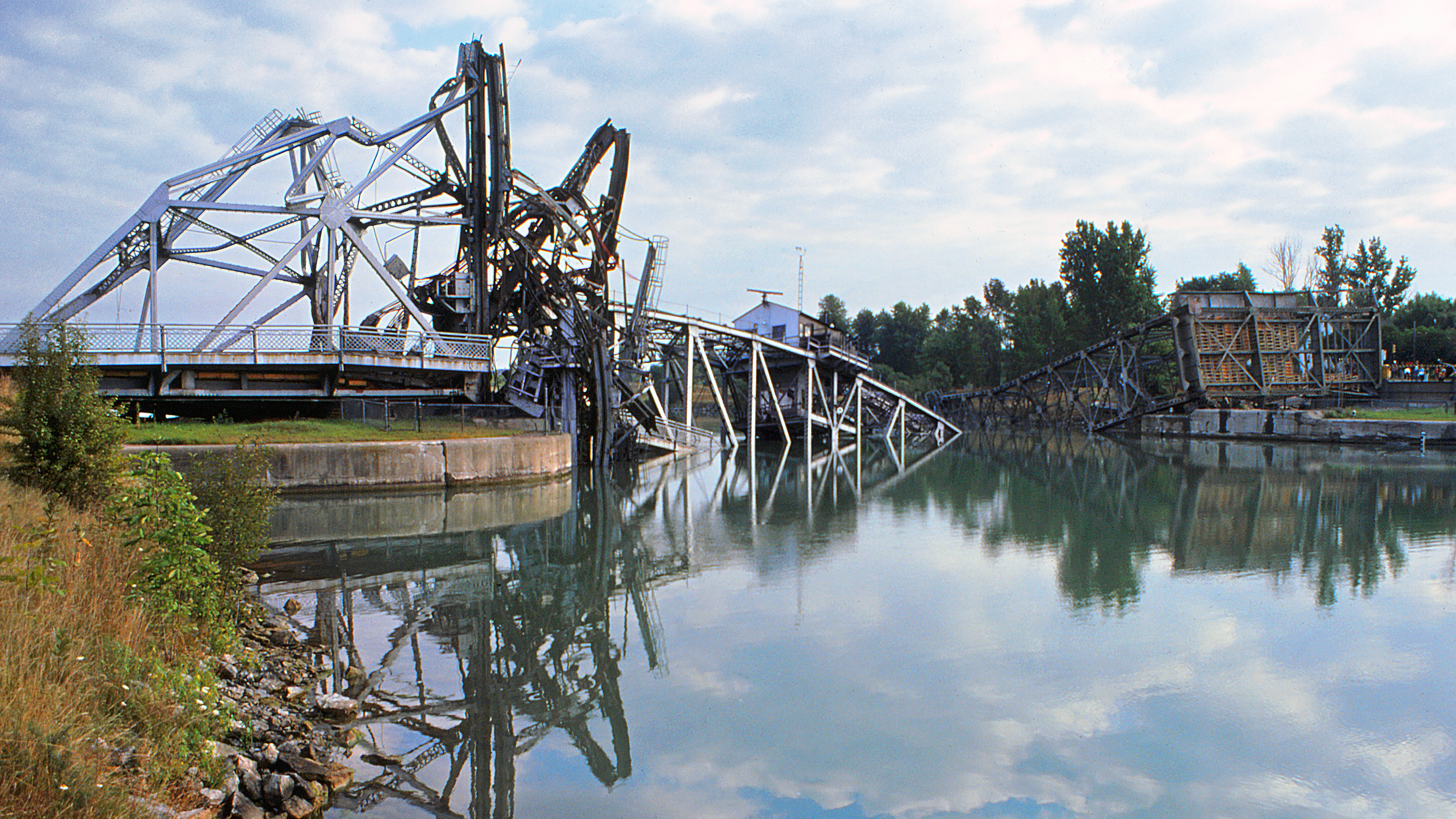
  Bridge 12 after collision
- In Port Robinson, Ontario, the freighter Steelton struck Bridge 12 on the Welland Canal, destroying it and injuring two people. The bridge was never rebuilt and would be replaced by a passenger ferry in 1977.
- In Auckland, New Zealand, politician Robert Muldoon, leader of the New Zealand National Party, punched demonstrators at a protest outside a meeting of landlords and property investors after a sack of flour struck him in the back.
- Belgian racer Eddy Merckx won the Men's Individual Road Race at the UCI Road World Championships in Montreal.
- The Copa Chile, the knockout tournament for soccer football in the South American nation of Chile, was won by Colo-Colo, 3 to 0, over the Santiago Wanderers team, in front of 50,468 fans at the Estadio Nacional in Santiago. Colo-Colo, which had finished third in regular season play, was based in the Santiago suburb of Macul. Wanderers had finished in 15th place with a losing record (9 wins, 15 losses, 10 draws) before sweeping through the playoffs. Less than a year earlier, the stadium had been used as a detention center for thousands of people arrested after the military coup d'etat of September 11.
- In American soccer football, the Los Angeles Aztecs defeated the Miami Toros on penalty kicks, 4 to 3, after both teams had played to a 3-3 draw, to win the championship of the North American Soccer League. The final, televised by CBS, was played in front of a crowd of 15,507 at the Orange Bowl.
- Died:
  - M. J. Coldwell PC CC, 85, English-born Canadian democratic socialist politician who founded the Co-operative Commonwealth Federation political party, predecessor to the New Democratic Party.
  - Pierre-Louis Gabriel Falaize, 69, French journalist and diplomat who was France's ambassador to Jordan, Libya, Laos and Lebanon at different times between 1954 and 1967
  - Harry K. Newburn, 68, American educator who had served as president of the University of Oregon (1945 to 1953), the University of Montana 1959 to 1963, Cleveland State University 1965-1966 and 1972-1973, and Arizona State University, 1969 to 1971, died of a heart attack.

== August 26, 1974 (Monday) ==
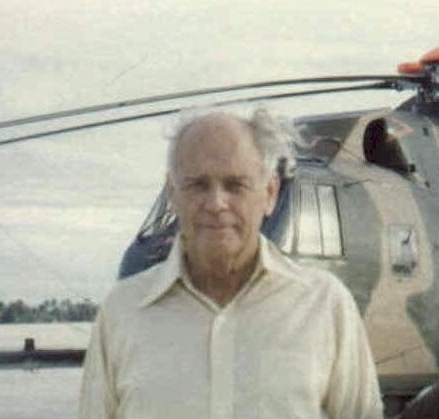
Lindbergh in 1972

- Charles Lindbergh, the American aviator, military officer and activist who made the first solo nonstop trans-Atlantic flight in 1927, died of lymphatic cancer at the age of 72. U.S. President Ford commented on Lindbergh's death: "In later years, his life was darkened by tragedy, and colored by political controversy. But, in both public and private life, General Lindbergh always remained a brave, sincere patriot."
- The Soviet Union launched the Soyuz 15 mission with cosmonauts Gennady Sarafanov and Lev Dyomin. At 48, Dyomin was the oldest human to have flown in space up to that time. Soyuz 15 was scheduled to dock with the Salyut 3 space station but failed to do so, due to a malfunction in the Igla docking system. After two days in orbit, the spacecraft returned safely to Earth on August 28.
- Representatives of Portugal and of the independence guerrilla organization PAIGC (Partido Africano para a Independência da Guiné e Cabo Verde) signed an agreement in Algiers to end the 11-year war between Portugal and the PAIGC. Portugal agreed to remove its troops from Portuguese Guinea and to recognize the independence of the Republic of Guinea-Bissau, in return for the PAIGC agreeing to protect Portuguese citizens and property in the West African nation.
- The Denver Racquets defeated the Philadelphia Freedoms, 2 games to 0, to win the first championship of World Team Tennis. After winning the first game in Denver, 27 to 21, Denver won the second game, 28 to 24, in Philadelphia to win the best 2-of-3 series.
- Robert Gainer, a 21-year-old American sailor, landed safely at Falmouth, Cornwall, after a two-month solo voyage across the Atlantic Ocean aboard the 22-foot (6.7 m) Sea Sprite sloop Hitchhiker.
- Born:
  - Huang Bo, Chinese film actor and director, winner of the 2009 Golden Horse Award for Best Leading Actor for the film Cow; in Jiuquan, Gansu province
  - Joaquín Furriel, Argentine stage, film and TV actor, winner of the 2016 Premio Cóndor de Plata award for Best Actor for El patrón: radiografía de un crimen; in Lomas de Zamora, Buenos Aires Province
- Died:
  - Junio Valerio Borghese, 68, Italian Royal Navy World War II commander in the Axis, and a neo-fascist activist known as "the Black Prince" (il principe nero), died in exile in Spain, where he had been harbored by the Franco government after the failure of the 1970 attempted coup d'etat, the Golpe Borghese.
  - Sir Donald Hopson, KCMG, DSO, MC, TD, 58, British diplomat and Ambassador to Argentina since 1973, and the Chargé d'affaires to the People's Republic of China from 1965 to 1968, died of a heart attack. Hopson had also served as ambassador to Laos (1962-1965), Mongolia (1965-1966), and Venezuela (1969-1972).

== August 27, 1974 (Tuesday) ==
- By a vote of 40,083 to 27,932, residents of Alaska voted to move the state capital from Juneau to a location near the village of Willow, 575 miles (925 km) away. The proposed capital was 37 miles (60 km) from Anchorage and voters opted for a site at least 30 miles (48 km) from Anchorage or Fairbanks. However, voters would later reject the move's associated construction costs, and Juneau remains the state capital.
- At the age of 12, Becky Schroeder of Toledo, Ohio, was granted her first patent for an invention, receiving U.S. Patent 3,832,556 for her creation, the "Glow Sheet", a "luminescent backing sheet for writing in the dark" that could be placed underneath a regular sheet of paper for use by persons needing to work in dimly lit places. She had applied for the patent on December 26, 1973, with the assistance of her father, a patent attorney.
- The case of Joan Little began at the jail in Beaufort County, North Carolina, when she stabbed a guard as he was raping her. Little escaped, then turned herself in to police and was charged with the murder of Clarence Alligood, who had made a practice of forcing female inmates to engage in sex with him. Little would be acquitted of the murder charge on August 15, 1975, after autopsy evidence confirmed her claim of self-defense. She became the first African-American woman to be acquitted of murder committed in self-defense against a sexual assault.
- British commercial diver Peter Kelly died of anoxia due to pure helium being fed through his breathing mask during a bell dive in the Norwegian Sector of the North Sea. The other diver in the bell pulled off his mask before losing consciousness and survived.
- Andrew Head, a tractor driver, discovered a woman's headless body near Swaffham, Norfolk in England. Police concluded that the woman was murdered during the first two weeks of August. The woman's head has never been found; she remains unidentified and her murder remains unsolved.
- Five people died in an explosion at a meatpacking plant in Cipolletti, Argentina.
- A memorial service for Charles Lindbergh was held in Kipahulu, Hawaii, at the small church next to which Lindbergh had been buried the previous day. Lindbergh's name was not mentioned during the half-hour service, at which fewer than 24 people were present.
- Died: Otto Strasser, 76, Nazi German politician who broke with the party in 1930 in opposition to Adolf Hitler, and lived in exile in various countries until coming to West Germany in 1955.

== August 28, 1974 (Wednesday) ==
- Rhodesia announced the selection of the "Ode to Joy" from Ludwig van Beethoven's Ninth Symphony as its new national anthem. Lyrics for the anthem would be chosen through a nationwide competition.
- Gerald Ford held his first news conference as President of the United States in the East Room of the White House.
- The CBS network withdrew its $50,000 bid for live television coverage of stuntman Evel Knievel's Snake River Canyon jump, planned for September 8. Top Rank, Inc., which was promoting the jump, had threatened to cancel it if the state of Idaho granted live TV rights to any broadcaster.
- Born: Carsten Jancker, German footballer with 33 caps for the German national team; in Grevesmühlen, East Germany
- Died: Philip Rhodes, 79, American naval architect and marine engineer

== August 29, 1974 (Thursday) ==
- Jimmy Taylor, a 12-year-old Aboriginal Australian boy, disappeared from Derby, Western Australia. As of 2023 the case remains unsolved.
- At Windsor Great Park, a Crown Estate property in southern England, police took action to disperse the 2,000 music fans attending the "Festival of the People", resulting in an eight-hour battle, 220 arrests and over 50 injuries.
- A 3:05 a.m. explosion destroyed an entire city block in the African-American nightclub district of Chattanooga, Tennessee, causing one death and at least 13 injuries.
- The August Rebellion, a prison riot, took place shortly after dusk at the Bedford Hills Correctional Facility for Women in Bedford, New York, as 200 prisoners took control of two buildings and a recreation yard to protest the brutal treatment of fellow prisoner Carol Crooks. The prisoners returned to their cells after midnight.
- Aerialist Philippe Petit fulfilled his promise to give a free show for the children of New York, crossing a 600-foot (180 m) cable at a 30-degree angle from a stand of trees on the northeast side of Belvedere Lake in Central Park to an 80-foot (24 m) height on the watchtower of Belvedere Castle, southwest of the lake.
- Malcolm "Mac" Graham and Eleanor "Muff" Graham (born Eleanor LaVerne Eddington), a married couple from San Diego, California, disappeared on Palmyra Atoll in the Pacific Ocean, to which they had traveled from Hawaii aboard their sailboat, the Sea Wind. Another sailor would discover Eleanor Graham's remains on the beach of Palmyra in 1981, after which ex-convict Buck Duane Walker and his girlfriend, Stephanie Stearns, the only other persons on Palmyra at the time of the Grahams' disappearance, would be charged with murdering Eleanor. Walker was convicted of the killing, but Stearns was acquitted. Stearns' defense attorney, Vincent Bugliosi, would co-write a 1991 book about the case, And the Sea Will Tell, which was adapted the same year into a television film.
- Died:
  - William M. Cann, 32, Chief of Police in Union City, California, died from wounds sustained when he was shot by a sniper on June 11, 1974.
  - Stanton Griffis, 87, American diplomat and financier, died from injuries sustained in an August 13 fire in his suite at the Pierre Hotel in New York. Griffis had served as U.S. ambassador to Poland, Egypt, Argentina and Spain during his career.
  - G. Ernest Wright, 64, American Old Testament scholar and biblical archaeologist

== August 30, 1974 (Friday) ==
- Radical far-left terrorists bombed the Mitsubishi Heavy Industries building in Tokyo, killing 8 and wounding more than 376.
- The Soviet Kashin-class destroyer Otvazhny sank after a defective anti-aircraft missile launched during Black Sea Fleet drills ignited a fire which resulted in the explosion of the ship magazines.
- An express train bound for Germany from Belgrade derailed in Zagreb, Yugoslavia (now Croatia), killing more than 150 passengers.
- The Astronomical Netherlands Satellite, the first Dutch satellite, was launched by a Scout rocket from Vandenberg Air Force Base in California.
- American racing driver Robert W. Bunselmeier was fatally injured during a sprint car race in Bloomington, Indiana. He would die of his injuries at the age of 27 the following day.
- Died: Eleanor Platt, 64, American sculptor, was found dead in her studio at the Park Plaza Hotel in Manhattan, New York City. Her death was ascribed to heart failure. After Calvin Jackson's arrest for the murder of Pauline Spanierman the following month, he would confess to the murders of 8 other women, including Platt.

== August 31, 1974 (Saturday) ==
- In the early morning hours on Interstate 10 in California, a sniper in a car pulled up alongside other drivers at random and fired at them, killing 3 people and wounding 6. A suspect was arrested shortly after 6 a.m.
- B. D. Jatti (Basappa Danappa Jatti) was sworn in as the fifth vice president of India, with the oath administered by President Ahmed. Jatti would serve as the acting president of India for five months in 1977 after Ahmed's sudden death.
- Born: Teruyoshi Ito, Japanese footballer with 27 caps for the Japan national team; in Shizuoka
- Died:
  - Norman Kirk PC, 51, Prime Minister of New Zealand since 1972, died unexpectedly of a pulmonary embolism five days after taking a leave of absence from work and three days after entering hospital.
  - Ali bin Abdullah Al Thani, 79, the former Emir of Qatar from 1949 to 1960, died in exile in Lebanon. He had abdicated the throne in favor of his son, Ahmad bin Ali Al Thani.
