= Piniella =

Piniella is a surname. Notable people with the surname include:

- Joaquim Amat-Piniella (1913–1974), Catalan writer and politician
- Lou Piniella (born 1943), American baseball player and manager
