= K.L. Reich =

Catalan novel about Mauthausen camp

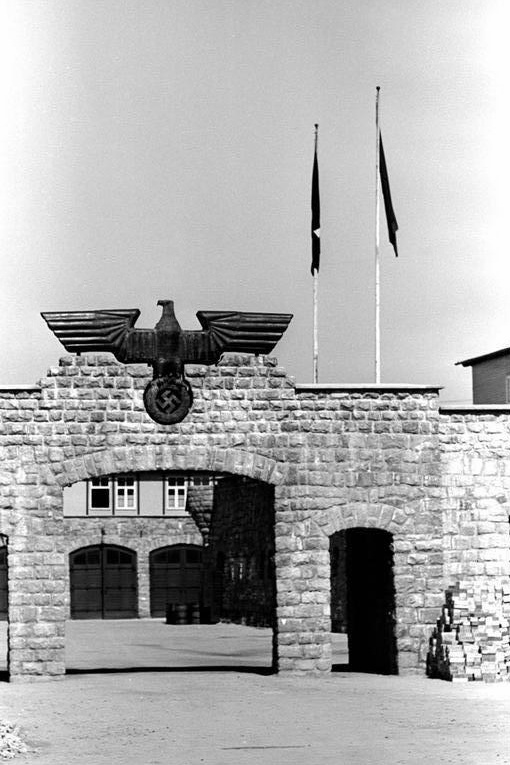
- Entrance to Mauthausen concentration camp
- Editors: Club Editor/Edicions 62
- Author: Joaquim Amat-Piniella
- Language: Catalan
- Genre: Testimonial novel
- Published: 1963/2001
- Publisher: Club Editor, Edicions 62
- English publication date: 2014

K.L. Reich is a semi-autobiographical novel written by the Catalan author Joaquim Amat-Piniella. It is based on his experiences as a Spanish Republican prisoner in the Mauthausen concentration camp during the Second World War. The first version was written in Andorra between 1945 and 1946, following Amat-Piniella's liberation from the camp. However, its publication was delayed for 17 years by state censorship in Franco's Spain. It was finally published in 1963, first in Spanish translation and then in the original Catalan.

== Title ==
The title of the novel refers to the letters K.L. Reich (Konzentrationslager Reich), which were stamped on many of the objects and articles in the camp. Amat-Piniella, who worked for a period in the Effektenkammer, the camp's warehouse, (Note: Amat-Piniella translates Effektenkammer as ‘el magatzem de la roba civil’ (civilian clothing warehouse). However, this may be rather misleading for the reader as, apart from the prisoners’ clothes, many other articles were confiscated and stored there: their jewels, watches, suitcases, toys etc. Moreover, the reference to “burned into the wood” in the quotation cited leads one to suppose that furniture destined for use by the camp’s guards was also kept here.) would have seen this stamp innumerable times. “Printed in ink on all the clothing, burned into the wood, Emili has had it constantly before his eyes for four and a half years, and he knows that it is the stigma with which they wanted to mark him too, the only epitaph his dead comrades have been given.”

== Dedications ==
The novel is dedicated to Amat-Piniella’s good friend Pere Vives i Clavé, who was murdered in the camp in 1941, and to General Omar N. Bradley, who headed the American forces that liberated the camp in 1945.

== Author’s note ==
In his 1963 preface to the novel, Amat-Piniella explains that his objective in writing the novel was to pay homage to the millions who contributed with their deaths to the defeat Nazism and, in particular, the thousands of Catalan and Spanish exiles who were imprisoned in Mauthausen. (Note: Amat-Piniella’s unpublished 1946 introduction to the novel was more explicitly denunciatory than that of 1963. In the latter, he may well have had in mind what might be acceptable to the censor; whereas, in the former, Amat-Piniella states proudly that it was the Spanish Republicans who first stood against international fascism. He denounces Franco, Pétain and Hitler as a “triad of criminals”, responsible for the murder of thousands of Spanish Republican exiles in Nazi concentration camps. Moreover, he makes explicit reference to those murdered and imprisoned in Spain itself by the fascists during and after the Civil War.)

== Structure ==
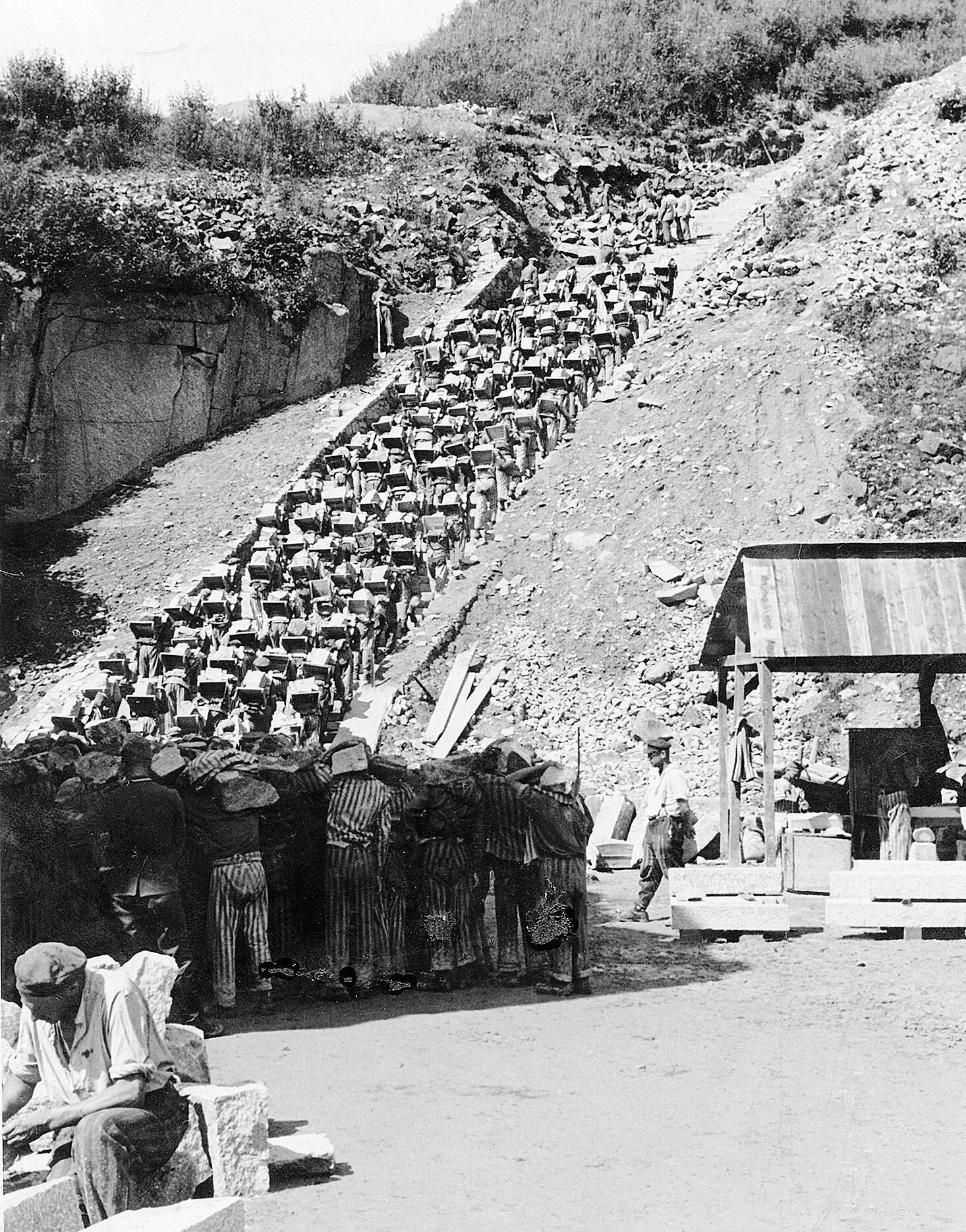
Prisoners in the quarry and the "stairs of death"

The novel is divided into eighteen chapters and sixty-two scenes or sequences, separated by double spaces. The sequences portray a kaleidoscope of situations and give the novel an almost anecdotal structure.

== Main characters ==
=== Prisoners ===
==== Emili ====
Emili is the main character, the author's alter ego and the third person (extradiegetic) narrator in the novel is identified with him. Emili is at the same time based on Amat-Piniella's friend Josep Arnal (José Cabrero Arnal). Emili, like Arnal, is for some of the period in Mauthausen able to avoid work in the infamous quarry by producing pornographic drawings for an SS guard.

==== Francesc ====
Francesc is inspired by the author's friend Pere Vives i Clavé, to whom the novel is in part dedicated. Francesc is an anarcho-syndicalist who refuses to be complicit with the daily violence in the camp. Like Pere Vives i Clavé, he is murdered by an injection of gasoline or petrol in the camp infirmary. In contrast to Emili, he is an optimist. “Francesc believed in happy endings: the lightning advance of the British army and national uprisings of the oppressed.”

==== August ====
August is based on the Valencian anarchist César Orquín Serra. He is described as being charismatic but somewhat megalomaniacal. Having acquired some German, he becomes the Spanish translator/interpreter and he manages to convince the SS that the Spanish prisoners would be more productive if they were treated less harshly. He is able to organise external Kommandos working for Austrian industries where the prisoners enjoyed slightly better conditions. “The men in August’s Kommando had overcome a period of physical and moral decline; their lives were now stabilized at a minimum level that would probably see them through to the end of the war.”

==== Rubio ====
Rubio works as one of the camp's barbers and servers as the leader of the underground communist network. The text characterizes him as methodical, tenacious, and inflexible, noting that his temperament suited the bureaucratic style the Party.”

==== Vicent ====
Vicent is constantly obsessed with acquiring more scraps of food however he could. “Vicent was one of the condemned, and he knew it. But facing death, he fought for his life like a cat turned on its back”.

==== Ernest ====
Ernest is a young man who becomes corrupted by the ‘spirit of the camp’ (see below) and is transformed from victim to oppressor. “… Ernest was well dressed, smoked good cigarettes, and stuffed himself with food. He was very young and couldn’t see farther than the end of his nose.”

==== Werner ====
Werner is a German common criminal who represents the counterpoint to the German kapos and the Nazi guards. He is witheringly critical of his country and compatriots: “I have stopped being German; I renounce the glory”

=== Others ===
==== Hans Gupper ====
Hans Gupper is the camp commandant and the most feared of the SS there. He was a founding member of the Nazi party in Austria. “Hans Gupper had an iron fist! Once in the camp, he was heartless: he obeyed orders and he gave them”.

== The 'Spirit of the Camp' ==
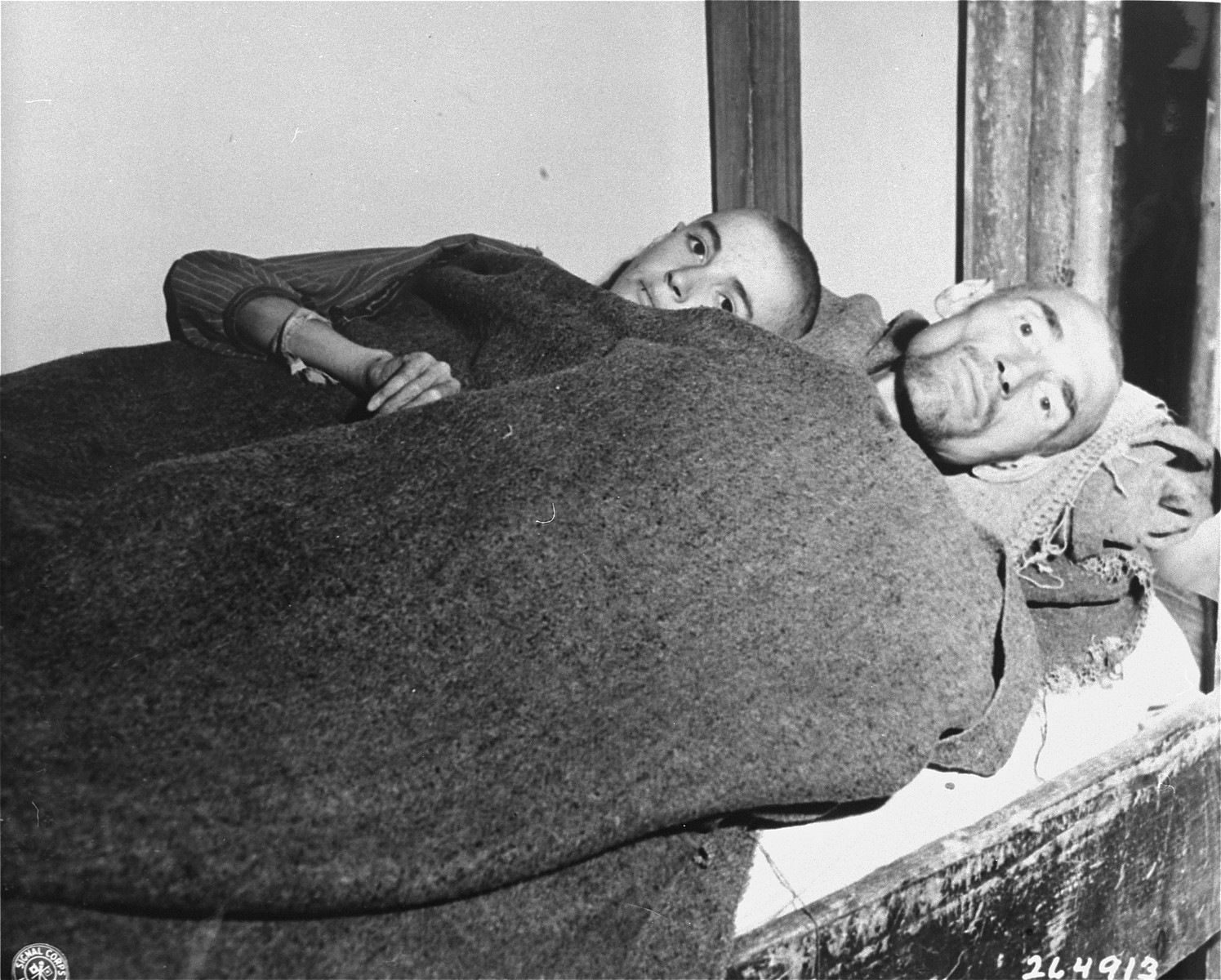
Two survivors of Gusen (a subcamp of Mauthausen)

Although he in no way seeks to fudge the distinction between the murderers and their victims, Amat-Piniella does not paint a simple black and white universe in the camp. The 'spirit of the camp' instilled by the Nazis sought to degrade and corrupt the prisoners, thus turning them into accomplices. The camps, according to Primo Levi, were an inverted moral universe, with a "grey zone" where irrationality prevailed. Francesc and Werner do not succumb to the spirit of the camp whereas Ernest clearly does. Other prisoners can be situated at various points in the grey zone. “Confinement in the camp was a polar night of unknown duration; to adapt to it one had to ignore the very existence of light.”

== Editions ==
K.L. Reich was published first in Spanish translation and then in the Catalan original in 1963, seventeen years after it had been written. During this period the author made various unsuccessful attempts to get the book through the Francoist censor and he also took the opportunity to polish the text. Finally, when the book was published the censor made no apparent cuts and Amat-Piniella authorised its publication. However, he had over the proceeding years removed various lengthy fragments from the text depicting the political leaders of the camp. He had also eliminated some explicitly political references. A small but telling example of the latter is when the author describes the collective suicide of three Hungarian Jews after the appallingly brutal treatment inflicted on them by the Nazis. In the original text, the three deliberately walk past a sentry's post singing the Internationale and are shot down. In the 1963 edition, the International becomes the more generic ‘himnes’. (Note: In the English translation (K.L. Reich, 2014) this is translated literally as ‘hymns’, thus giving a quasi-religious connotation quite distinct from the original.)

In 2001, a version of K.L. Reich was published based on the original 1945-46 text, restoring the fragments and references which had been eliminated.

== Translations ==
- Spanish: K. L. Reich. Miles de españoles en los campos de Hitler. Translated by Baltasar Porcel. Barcelona: Seix-Barral, 1963.
- Spanish: K. L. Reich. Translated by Antonio Padilla. Edited by David Serrano. Barcelona: El Aleph, 2002; 2009 [ebook]
- English: K. L. Reich [K. L. Reich]. Translated by Robert Finley and Marta Marín-Dòmine. Waterloo, Ontario, Canada: Wilfrid Laurier University Press. 2014.
- German: K. L. Reich [K. L. Reich]. Translated by Kirsten Brandt. Vienna: Czernin Verlag, 2016.

The English and German translations are based on the 1963 Catalan edition. In her introduction to the former, Marta Marín-Dòmine argues that Amat-Piniella considered it to be the “definitive” one and, moreover, the text that offers “the most polished use of Catalan”.

== Reception ==
While the novel gained some acclaim in literary circles when it was finally published in 1963, it cannot be said that the book was an immediate success. Five years elapsed before the second edition was published and a further eight before the third appeared, while it took twenty years before the second Spanish edition emerged. The seventeen-year delay in publication due to censorship and the fact that it was written in Catalan, a language actively persecuted by the Franco regime, are factors which go someway in explaining its initial lack of success.

However, it has been argued that K.L. Reich may have suffered the fate of other European literature on the concentration camps in that the anti-communism of the Cold War left little room for the public remembrance of the concentration camps. While this hypothesis may go some way in explaining, for example, the belated best seller status of Primo Levi's Se questo è un uomo (If this is a Man) in the 1970s and 1980s, it is difficult to see how it can account for the more modest success of K.L. Reich, which did not occur until the 2000s, when it began to feature regularly in Catalan school textbooks. Also notable in this respect is the fact that an English translation did not appear until 2014, fifty years after the book was first published. What seems more likely as another barrier to the book's initial success is that the political conflict portrayed in the novel, between anarchists and communists was disconcerting for some readers. As Marta Marín-Dòmine explains in her translator's introduction to the English translation of K.L.Reich: “Amat-Piniella was undoubtedly aware of the difficulties of depicting this conflict and the reactions the novel was likely to receive from the survivors, many of whom were highly engaged politically.” Moreover, the novel's portrayal of the anarchist leader César Orquín Serra in the shape of August, although certainly not uncritical, would have alienated those communists who considered him a “provocateur” and "lackey of the SS".
