= August Jam =

Outdoor concert in 1974

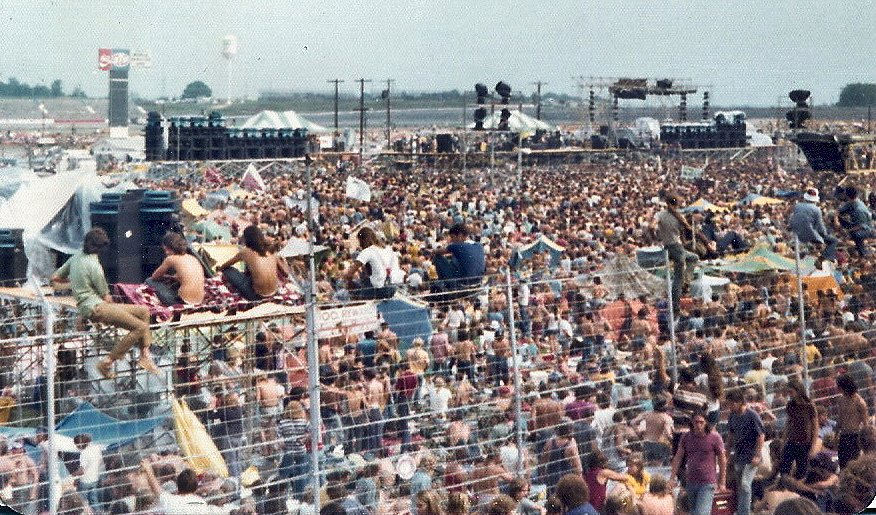
- Genre: Rock, including blues-rock, progressive rock, country rock, and Southern rock styles
- Dates: August 10, 1974
- Locations: Concord, North Carolina, United States
- Years active: 1974
- Founders: Kaleidoscope Productions, AYS and WROQ
- Attendance: 300,000+
- Website: Scan of Newspaper Ad for Concert

August Jam was an outdoor concert held on Saturday, August 10, 1974, at the Charlotte Motor Speedway outside of Charlotte, North Carolina, in the United States. The concert promoter was Kaleidoscope Productions and it was sponsored by radio stations WAYS and WROQ. The concert featured The Allman Brothers Band, Emerson, Lake & Palmer, Foghat, Black Oak Arkansas, The Marshall Tucker Band, The Ozark Mountain Daredevils, PFM, Grinderswitch, and others. The Eagles were booked to play, but canceled. It was the largest concert ever held in the state of North Carolina and one of the largest in the U.S. at that time, with an estimated attendance in excess of 300,000.

== History ==
The November 1974 issue of Circus magazine had this to say about Emerson, Lake & Palmer's performance:

Emerson, Lake and Palmer performed an operation on the U.S. this summer... In Charlotte, North Carolina, the feedback fiends caused double-trouble with the hot boogie chefs, The Allman Brothers, in what was billed as an August Jam. The fans were so blitzed by the groups' powerhouse sets they sat dazed in their automobiles after the show and jammed Charlotte traffic for hours.

There was a limited number of tickets sold prior to the concert, and when many thousands of additional fans showed up on the day of the performances, those thousands proceeded to crash the fences and rush to the infield. Many of the facilities were overwhelmed due to the crowds, and the weather did not cooperate either, producing a sporadic rain that drenched the concert goers, and turned the infield into a muddy quagmire. However, the music went on as scheduled.

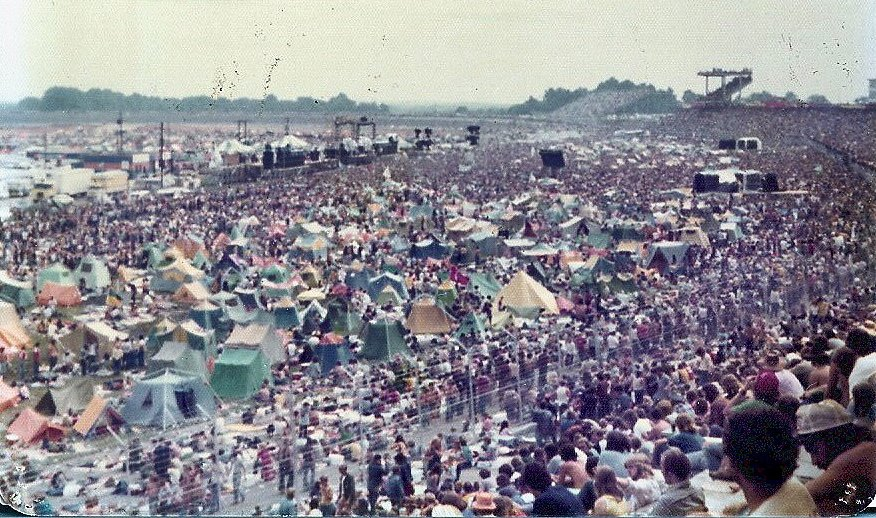
Another view of August Jam

== See also ==
- List of historic rock festivals
- List of jam band music festivals
