= Olivier Dubois (journalist) =

French journalist

Olivier Dubois

Olivier Dubois (French pronunciation: [ɔlivje dybwa]; born 6 August 1974) is a French journalist who covers Malian affairs for Le Point and Libération. In April 2021, he was abducted in Gao by the jihadist group Jama'at Nasr al-Islam wal Muslimin. He was freed on 20 March 2023 following a joint effort by Niger and France.

== Career ==
Dubois moved to Bamako, Mali, in 2015 to work as a journalist covering conflicts in the region. There, he directed a documentary series titled Poilorama for ARTE Créative.

In 2020, he joined the newspaper Libération as a freelancer, covering several major events in Mali, such as the 2020 Malian protests and the liberation of French-Swiss humanitarian worker Sophie Pétronin, who had been abducted by Jama'at Nasr al-Islam wal Muslimin.

In late February 2021, he covered conflicts in the Dogon country in Mali, spending several days with the Dan Na Ambassagou militia and having photographs taken by him published in Libération for the first time.

== Abduction ==
In late March 2021, Dubois had pitched a story to Libération to interview Abdallah Ag Albakaye, a lieutenant in Jama'at Nasr al-Islam wal Muslimin, the official branch of Al-Qaeda in Mali, seeking information, particularly on the group's conflict with the Islamic State in the Greater Sahara, a rival jihadist organisation.

On 8 April, Dubois arrived in Gao by plane. After having breakfast at the Askia Motel, his fixer (who had arranged the interview and was later arrested) reported that he embarked into a car with several men. Two days later, on 10 April, Dubois did not show up for his flight out of Gao.

On 4 May, a 21-second video was released on social media of Dubois stating that he had been abducted and asking "my family, my friends and the French authorities for them to do everything in their power to free me." After the release of the video, the French Ministry of Foreign Affairs confirmed that he had gone missing and that they were investigating the authenticity of the video. Later that month, Jean-Yves Le Drian, French Minister of Europe and Foreign Affairs confirmed that he had been abducted.

On 7 May, the Committee to Protect Journalists issued a statement calling for his immediate release and stating that "journalists covering the Sahel region face an extremely high threat of kidnapping, and work under very dangerous circumstances."

On 7 June, demonstrations organised by Reporters sans frontières were held in Paris and Bamako calling for his release.

A second video was released on social media in March 2022. In the undated 69-second video, Dubois addressed his family and the French government, asking for his release.

After nearly two years in captivity, Dubois was released on 20 March 2023. His release took place following a months-long effort by authorities in Niger. He was released alongside another hostage, U.S. aid worker Jeffery Woodke, to French and U.S. authorities before being transported to Niamey.

== Personal life ==
Dubois has a wife and two children.
