= Robert Cruickshank (bacteriologist) =

Scottish bacteriologist

Professor Robert Cruickshank CBE FRSE FRCP FRCPE

Professor of Bacteriology, University of London
- In office 1949–1957

Personal details
- Born: 26 September 1899 Strichen, Aberdeenshire, Scotland
- Died: 16 August 1974 (aged 74)
- Occupation: Bacteriologist

Robert Cruickshank (26 September 1899 – 16 August 1974) was a Scottish bacteriologist. He did much early work on cancer research and aerobiology, including the airborne spread of streptococcus. He was an expert in the field of epidemiology.

== Life ==
He was born on 26 September 1899 in the village of Strichen in northern Scotland, into a farming background. He attended school locally then won a place studying medicine at the University of Aberdeen graduating with an MB ChB in 1922. He won the Alexander Anderson Travelling Scholarship, allowing him further study at the Pathology Department of the University of Glasgow. Here he worked with Robert Muir and Carl Browning who each influenced him in his choice of career as a bacteriologist.

Initially working in the Hospital For Sick Children in Glasgow he was given a Fellowship in cancer research. In 1928 he was appointed a lecturer in bacteriology at the University of Glasgow while also taking the role of bacteriologist for Glasgow Royal Infirmary. Here he made important observations and advances in the understanding of streptococcal infections in burn victims.

In 1936 he was appointed Director of the LCC Group Laboratory at the North West Fever Hospital in London. Despite a decade of ill-health, he built up the reputation of the laboratory in the field of bacteriological research. In 1945 he became the first Director of the Central Public Health Laboratory in Colindale in north London, establishing it as a centre for medical microbiology.

In 1949 he became Professor of Bacteriology at the University of London linked to St Mary's Hospital. In 1955 he became Director of the Wright-Fleming Institute, formerly the Sir Almoth Wright Inoculation Department. In 1958 he returned to Scotland to take up a chair in Bacteriology at the University of Edinburgh. He was made a Fellow of the Royal College of Physicians (London) in 1946. He was elected a Fellow of the Royal Society of Edinburgh in 1959. His proposers were George Lightbody Montgomery, David Whitteridge, Guy Frederic Marrian, and James Pickering Kendall. In 1966 he was created a Commander of the Order of the British Empire (CBE). The University of Aberdeen awarded him an honorary doctor of letters (LLD) in 1968.

He retired in 1966 and took on the role of Professor of Social and Preventative Medicine at the University of the West Indies which linked to the Ministry of Health in Jamaica. During this period he also represented the UK at the Scientific Advisory Committee of the Pakistan-SEATO Cholera Research Laboratory in Dacca, Pakistan. He retired fully in 1968.

He died on 16 August 1974.

== Family ==
He married Margaret Petrie in 1929. They had one daughter, Nancy, and one son, Neil.

== Publications ==
- Modern Trends in Immunology vol 1 (1963)
- Modern Trends in Immunology vol 2 (1967)
- Handbook of Bacteriology (editing) (1960)
- The Practice of Medical Microbiology (editing)
- Perspectives in Public Health

== See also ==
- Section of Epidemiology and State Medicine
