= Calvin Jackson (serial killer) =

American serial killer, rapist and necrophile

- Born: March 5, 1948 (age 78); Buffalo, New York, U.S.
- Other name: The Central Park Slasher
- Conviction: Murder x9
- Penalty: Life imprisonment x4
- Comments: NYS DIN 76A2732

Details
- Victims: 9
- Span of crimes: 1973–1974
- Country: United States
- State: New York
- Date apprehended: September 12, 1974
- Imprisoned at: Green Haven Correctional Facility, Beekman, New York

Calvin Jackson (born March 5, 1948) is an American serial killer and rapist responsible for the murders of nine women in Manhattan's West Side between 1973 and 1974. The killings were connected only after Jackson was arrested and confessed to them; until then, the deaths were considered to be from natural causes or accidents. In July 1976, he was convicted and sentenced to four life imprisonment terms with a chance of parole. One of his victims was sculptor Eleanor Platt.

== Biography ==
Calvin Jackson was born on March 5, 1948, in Buffalo, New York. He came from a poor family, who lived in an urban area populated by other impoverished black families. In his teenage years, he became addicted to drugs, and after graduating from the 10th grade, he dropped out of school and began leading a criminal lifestyle. In October 1965, he was arrested for robbery, found guilty and sentenced to 5 years imprisonment, which he served at the Elmira Correctional Facility. After being paroled in the late 1960s, Jackson moved to New York City, where he met Valerie Coleman, whom he married. Due to problems with discipline, he had trouble finding a job, as a result of which he was forced to do odd jobs, periodically committing thefts in the Manhattan area, for which he was imprisoned on several occasions. In 1970, he was arrested on charges of drug possession, was convicted and spent 90 days in jail. Over the next three years, Calvin was arrested three more times on charges of drug possession and theft, but each time, he got off with short prison terms. In early 1972, Jackson and his partner found accommodation at the Park Plaza Hotel in Manhattan's West Side which, at the time, was plagued by poverty and crime. Soon after the move, Jackson cleared himself from his drug addiction and took on a job as a porter. Most of his friends and acquaintances at that time spoke extremely positively of him.

== Murders ==
As victims, Calvin Jackson chose single women between the ages of 39 and 79, who were smothered with a pillow during robberies, after which he had sex with their corpses. Eight of his nine victims lived at the Park Plaza Hotel. On April 10, 1973, Jackson broke into the hotel room where 39-year-old Theresa Jordan lived, smothering her with a pillow, defiling her corpse and then stealing her valuables. On July 19, in the same manner, he entered the hotel room of 65-year-old Kate Lewisohn, whom he also smothered with a pillow and raped her corpse. On April 24, 1974, Jackson burgled a hotel room where 60-year-old Mable Hartmeyer lived. The killer strangled the woman, after which he raped her corpse and stole money and valuables from her room. Five days later, on April 29, he entered the hotel room of 79-year-old Yeria Vishnefsky, whom he stabbed and robbed. On June 8, Jackson committed another murder at the Park Plaza Hotel, his victim being 47-year-old Winifred Miller, whom he smothered with a pillow and raped thereafter. A few days later, on June 19, Jackson also strangled 71-year-old Blanche Vincent on the hotel grounds, after which he raped her body. On July 1, he entered the hotel room of 69-year-old Martha Carpenter. He stole money and other valuables, and then proceeded to strangle the elderly woman and rape the body thereafter. The next victim was 64-year-old Eleanor Platt, who was found dead in her room at the Park Plaza Hotel on August 30. On September 12, Jackson burgled one of the apartments in a building located next to the Park Plaza Hotel, where 69-year-old Pauline Spanierman lived. Using his usual tactics, he smothered the victim with a pillow, raped her corpse, and then stole a number of objects of value from her apartment.

== Arrest ==
The body of Jackson's last victim, Spanierman, was discovered on the morning of September 12, 1974, by a maid who had called the police. While investigating her killing, the police interviewed several of her neighbors, as well as several dozen residents of the building where she lived in and nearby occupants of the Park Plaza Hotel. During these interrogations, several witnesses were located. One of them stated that in the early morning, he had noticed a dark-skinned young man who, with a TV in his hands, left the house where the murder took place using the fire escape, and then disappeared on the opposite side of the street. Another witness, a resident of the Park Plaza Hotel, told police that on the morning of that same day, a friend of his, 26-year-old Calvin Jackson, came to his room with a request to leave a number of items of material value, including a TV, for safekeeping. After a search of his hotel room, the TV and other items were identified by Spanierman's relatives as hers. Based on the testimonies and evidence, six hours after the body was discovered, Jackson was arrested near the hotel, and was charged with murder and burglary.

Once at the police station, Jackson, during the first interrogation, confessed to the murder of Spanierman, as well as 10 other murders. Despite the fact that Jackson's confessions reflected a great deal of correspondence in the description of details of the victims' appearances, the times and dates of their murders, his claims were questioned, since in most cases, no signs of a struggle or burglary were found at the crime scenes. In order to confirm his testimony, in the following months, the police exhumed the bodies of a number of murdered women so they could examine them and find traces of a homicide, but the test results proved inconclusive. While verifying Jackson's claims, it was found that two of the women he had confessed to killing were found to be alive. However, 90-year-old Maria Gallino, a resident of the Park Plaza Hotel, told police that she was indeed attacked by a young African-American man on April 4, 1973. Another resident, 74-year-old Sylvia Cohen, said that on August 5, during an attempted robbery, she was beaten into unconsciousness by a young black man. After this information was released to the public, several hundred people organized a rally in front of a nearby police station accusing the police of negligent investigation efforts. They demanded that the New York City mayor, Abraham Beame, should investigate and appropriately punish the officials, as their failure to connect the murders and take precautions led to senseless death. Law enforcement officials would later confirm that they did not suspect a serial killer was operating in the area and were forced to admit that the cases were connected only after Jackson's arrest. This confession led protestors to claim that the high crime rate in the West Side was a result of the city service's failures to respond on all levels.

Despite the fact that in at least four cases, the investigation was unable to establish signs of a violent death due to the rate of decomposition, Calvin Jackson was charged with 9 murders and about 40 other crimes, including numerous rapes, burglaries and thefts. On the advice of his lawyer, at the end of 1974, Jackson recanted his confessions and declared that he was insane, on the basis of which his lawyers filed a motion for a psychiatric examination.

== Trial ==
Following two psychiatric examinations, Jackson was declared insane, but these decisions were challenged by the prosecutor's office, which filed a motion. It was granted, and in 1975, Jackson was admitted to the Bellevue Hospital for a third exam, which determined that he was sane. He was put on trial in early 1976. After reading out his 182-page long confession and accompanying audio recordings lasting more than 3 hours, on May 25, by a jury verdict, he was found guilty of 9 murders and numerous other charges. On July 6, 1976, he was sentenced to four life imprisonment terms, with a chance of parole. When he received his verdict, Jackson did not react in any way.

== Aftermath ==
All the subsequent years of his life, Calvin Jackson was housed in various penitentiaries across New York State. In September 1999, he became eligible for parole, but was denied. In September 2017, having spent more than 43 years in prison, Jackson was included in a list of 50 convicted criminals in the state of New York who were in prison for more than 41 years, and still had chance for parole.

As of the end of 2020, the 72-year-old Jackson was serving his sentence at the Sullivan Correctional Facility, under the ID number 76A2732. His last parole hearing was in March 2021.

== See also ==
- List of serial killers in the United States
