= Arizona Downs =

Horse racing track in Prescott Valley, Arizona

- Interactive map of Arizona Downs
- Location: Prescott Valley, Arizona, United States
- Coordinates: 34.646471°N 112.280852°W
- Owned by: Dave Auther; Tom Auther; Mike Auther
- Operated by: J&J Equine Enterprises LLC
- Date opened: 1959 (67 years ago)
- Race type: Thoroughbred; Quarter horse
- Course type: Flat

Arizona Downs (formerly known as Yavapai Downs, is a horse racing track in Prescott Valley, Arizona. The track hosts both thoroughbred and quarter horse racing. Formerly known as Yavapai Downs, it last conducted regular races in 2010 and resumed a shortened season of live racing in 2019. Following the COVID pandemic, Arizona Downs ran a mixed Quarter Horse and Thoroughbred race meet in the summer from 2020-2022 and did not race its typical summer meet in 2023 due to financial difficulties.

== History ==
The original track, was built on the old Rodeo Grounds in Prescott in 1959. It ran race meetings until 2000. Because the original track had no room for expansion, a new track was built in nearby Prescott Valley. That track was named Yavapai Downs, after the Native American Tribe and the county it was located in. It held race meets from 2000 to 2010 and declared bankruptcy in 2011.

In 2013, Gary Miller of Scottsdale purchased the property for $5.5 Million, after an earlier bid of $3.25 Million was rejected by the USDA. The newly renamed PV Speedway opened for the 2014 season, but the Yavapai Downs horse racing track never resumed operation. In mid-2014, Miller put the property back up for sale for an asking price of $7.45 Million. His attempts to sell were unsuccessful, and in March 2015 Miller filed for Chapter 7 Bankruptcy and all operations at the property ceased.

In 2018, the facility was purchased for $3.22 million in bankruptcy court by J&J Equine Enterprises LLC. It was announced on June 20 that the facility would reopen under the new name of Arizona Downs, with the intent to resume simulcasting later in the summer and live racing in the summer of 2019. Arizona Downs has expanded its footprint in Arizona by opening off track betting locations in Flagstaff, Pinetop Lake Havasu City and two OTB sites in Phoenix.

=== 2019 Reopening ===
The newly renovated Arizona Downs had its grand opening on May 24, 2019.

==== Dispute over simulcasts ====
Revenues for the reopened track were reduced when the industry's biggest video company Monarch Content Management, refused to sell its simulcasts to Arizona Downs. Monarch officials have said in addition to the Prescott Valley operation not fitting their business plan, and they want no dealings with the track because of a prior legal dispute with former partner Cory Johnson.

Lawmakers passed a bill requiring Monarch and all signal providers to provide equal access or no access to all simulcast signals to all licensed permittee's in the state. That measure, Arizona House Bill 2547 (“HB 2547”) was signed by Gov. Doug Ducey on June 7, and went into effect Aug. 27, 2019.

On August 9, 2019 Monarch filed a lawsuit seeking to block the law from going into effect.

On December 20, 2019, a request for a preliminary injunction filed by Monarch was denied. Monarch failed to show a likelihood that they would succeed on the merits of any of their claims.

On December 19, 2023 the Arizona Racing Commission revoked the live racing permit for Arizona Downs, citing financial difficulties.
