= Eleanor Platt =

American sculptor

- Born: 1910; Woodbridge Township
- Died: 1974; New York City
- Occupations: Sculptor, artist
- Awards: Guggenheim Fellowship (1945)

Eleanor Platt (1910–1974) was an American sculptor. She was known for her bronze or plaster busts often of members of the government, especially the judiciary. In 1945 she was named a Guggenheim Fellow.

== Biography ==
Eleanor Platt was one of the foremost classical American sculptors of the 20th Century. Her works are included in the Metropolitan Museum of Art, the National Portrait Gallery, the Hall of Great Americans at New York University, as well as in other museums, universities, and government buildings throughout the country. Platt was a portraitist, sculpting busts and commemorative medals of many important historical figures of the 19th and 20th centuries, especially within the judiciary and government. Throughout her prolific career she sculpted over 40 busts, 10 bas-reliefs, and 30 medals, while serving important positions within the arts community. Sculpting was Platt's only career, she made a fully independent living from her art. This was especially impressive considering she graduated from art school in the middle of the Great Depression. She quickly made a name for herself with her early works of Learned Hand, John Flanagan, and Arthur Lee. Her career spanned almost five decades. Platt acted as her own business agent negotiating all aspects of her work including materials, contracts, casting, proofs, photography, shipping arrangements, and communications with her customers. She kept her own studio/apartment in Manhattan for many years and refused to leave when the neighborhood declined because she said she loved the natural light in her studio. She sculpted her portraits from both sittings and photographs.

Platt married Charles J. Flavin in 1944, divorced, and then married Victor Russo until his death in 1957.

=== Early years and background ===
Eleanor Platt was born in Woodbridge, New Jersey in 1910 to George Gilbert Platt Jr. and Eva (Smith) Platt. Platt had three older siblings: Howard, Florence, and Lester. Being the youngest child earned her the family nickname Babe, which stayed with her throughout her life.

=== Education ===
Platt studied exclusively with the Norwegian-born sculptor Arthur Lee, and Edward McCarten from 1929 to 1933 at the Art Students League of New York. In 1934 she finished her formal education at the Continuation School in New York City. In 1940 she received the Chaloner Prize. In 1944 she was granted $1,000 from the American Academy and Institute of Arts and Letters, and in 1945 she was named a Guggenheim Fellow. For a complete biography and gallery of Platt's works please visit eleanorplatt.org.

=== Death ===
Platt was found dead in her studio at the Park Plaza Hotel on West 77th Street in New York City on August 30, 1974. Her death was initially ascribed to heart failure, but it was later determined that she was killed by Calvin Jackson, a serial killer who had murdered eight other women, most in the Park Plaza where he also lived. She was survived by her mother, a sister, and a brother.

== Portrait busts ==
Most of Platt's portrait busts were sculpted in clay and then employed the lost-wax method to cast her finished pieces in bronze or plaster. All of her casting was done by the Roman Bronze Works, Inc. of Corona, New York. Many of the finished busts were first sent to the Peter A. Juley photography studio in Manhattan before being shipped to their final destination. Professional photographs of the busts were given to the new owners as part of the finished work. Both the Roman Bronze Works Company and the Peter Juley photography studio have since gone out of business. Platt's job production records from the Roman Bronze Company are housed in the Amon Carter Museum archives, and the photographic negatives of a number of her works are housed in the Smithsonian Museum.

Among her subjects were Louis D. Brandeis, Learned Hand, Albert Einstein, and Earl Warren.

In 1974, Girl Scouts of the USA began selling miniature replica editions of a Juliette Low bust. A Girl Scouts promotional brochure stated, "On October 31, 1974, the bronze portrait bust of Juliette Gordon Low, created by noted sculptor Eleanor Platt, was placed in the Rotunda of the State Capital in Atlanta, Georgia. Now Girl Scouts U.S.A announces the availability of miniature replicas of the original Juliette Low bust. Cast in Durastone, under the supervision of Ms. Platt, each replica has been hand rubbed to a rich, bronze-color finish, stands 9.5" tall, including black base, and bears the signatures of both sculptor and subject. Included with each replica is a history card and brass plate suitable for engraving." The busts were sold for $15.00 plus $1.50 in shipping and handling.

== Awards & Associations ==
=== Awards ===
- Chaloner Prize three-year scholarship 1940
- Grant from The American Academy of Arts and Letters 1944
- Guggenheim Fellowship 1945

=== Memberships & Associations ===
- Board Member of the Art Commission of New York City
- Fellow of the National Sculpture Society
- Member of the National Academy of Design
- Listed in "Who's Who in America"
- Listed in "Who's Who of American Women"
