= Trent Keegan =

NZ photojournalist (1974–2008)

- Born: 12 August 1974. New Plymouth, New Zealand
- Died: 28 May 2008 (aged 33); Nairobi, Kenya
- Cause of death: Severe head injuries; unknown cause. Suspected hit and run or mugging
- Body discovered: Drainage ditch off Nairobi highway
- Resting place: New Zealand
- Occupation: Photojournalist
- Website: trentkeegan.com

Trent Keegan (12 August 1974 – 28 May 2008) was a photojournalist from New Zealand who was found dead in a ditch from apparent head injuries in Nairobi, Kenya. Before he died, Keegan was on a photo project on the Maasai in the northern region of Tanzania.

== Personal ==
Keegan was born on 12 August 1974 in New Plymouth, North Island, New Zealand. Following his death in 2008 at the age of 33, he was survived by both of his parents, Mike and Trish, as well as his sister, Nikki. Following his untimely death, Trent was bought back to New Zealand by his sister where they held a funeral for him.

== Career ==
After leaving New Zealand, he spent time in Ireland working as a freelance photographer for Irish newspapers and magazines. In that time period, Keegan was recognized with multiple awards from the Irish Professional Photographers Association. Keegan spent the last decade of his career traveling and furthering his career in places such as Darfur, New Orleans, and Kenya. Trent's goal in life was to help those less fortunate than he, by giving them a voice through his camera.

== Death ==
Nairobi is located in Kenya and is north of Tanzania. Nairobi is shown here relative to Dodoma, which is the capital city of Tanzania.

Before his death, Keegan was currently working on the report of a local Kenyan tribe that was being forced to leave their land to make way for a new safari park that was planned to be constructed. One of his friends, Jim Gallagher, states that Keegan mentioned he was visited by local police and safari security officers. He was questioned about the nature of his story and during the interrogation, he supposedly was advised to leave Tanzania for his own safety. After the confrontation, he reported the incident to the Chief of Police. Nothing more from the incident was mentioned by Keegan, as he told his friend he was not worried because he always travels safely and with other people around. Keegan was last seen getting into a taxi at 9:30PM, leaving after spending time with a local volunteer from the Voluntary Mission Movement organization. Approximately 10 hours later, Keegan was found dead off the side of the highway in a drainage ditch.

=== Investigation ===
Despite police ruling Keegan's death as a robbery/murder, his family and friends still have ideas of their own. Many different interviews that have been conducted with Keegan's family show that although the hit and run or mugging are possibilities, they believe that his work at the time relates back to his death. Not only was he covering a dispute between two groups of people with one side not wanting it publicized, Keegan also mentioned to his father that he witnessed a man shoot a pregnant lady right in front of him and planned to reveal it to authorities. Another reason as to why his family believes that his death related back to his work is that when police recovered Keegan's personal items from his person, his laptop and camera were missing but his wallet was found and with cash inside. Also, there is evidence that Keegan's body was "carefully dragged' into the ditch where he was found deceased. There are closed-circuit cameras that could have witnessed what happened to Keegan, but police gave no information on whether or not the cameras had any evidence on them or not. He even mentioned to one of his friends that he was being threatened. All together, these factors came into play and made the family and many others suspicious because based on the evidence, his death does not seem to be from a normal robbery or hit and run incident. A few months into the investigation, Kenyan police say they had five men in custody who they believe have connections to the death of Keegan. Their name nor any other information was given when that news was released. In 2009, Kenyan police released information stating that they have two men in custody who were charged with robbery of Keegan. However, both men were acquitted by the Nairobi court of all charges. In 2011, Hesbon Amadade was charged with the murder of Keegan but he was also acquitted of the charges. No one else has been arrested or linked to the death of Trent Keegan.

== Context ==
His coverage of the dispute happening between Thomson Safaris (an American company) and the Maasai tribesmen may have been the reason why his life was taken.

== Reactions ==
The Committee to Protect Journalists released the following statement through a spokesperson: "This is a devastating loss for those who knew Trent Keegan, a photographer who worked to document people in need of a voice around the world. The Kenyan police must act decisively to bring whoever killed Keegan to justice. Time is of the essence here, as it is in all murder investigations."

== Media ==
- "Real Life: Who Killed Trent Keegan?" created by documentary-maker, Bob Harley.

== Awards ==
Keegan received several awards for his work from the Irish Professional Photographers Association
