= Joaquim Amat-Piniella =

Catalan writer; Mauthausen concentration camp survivor

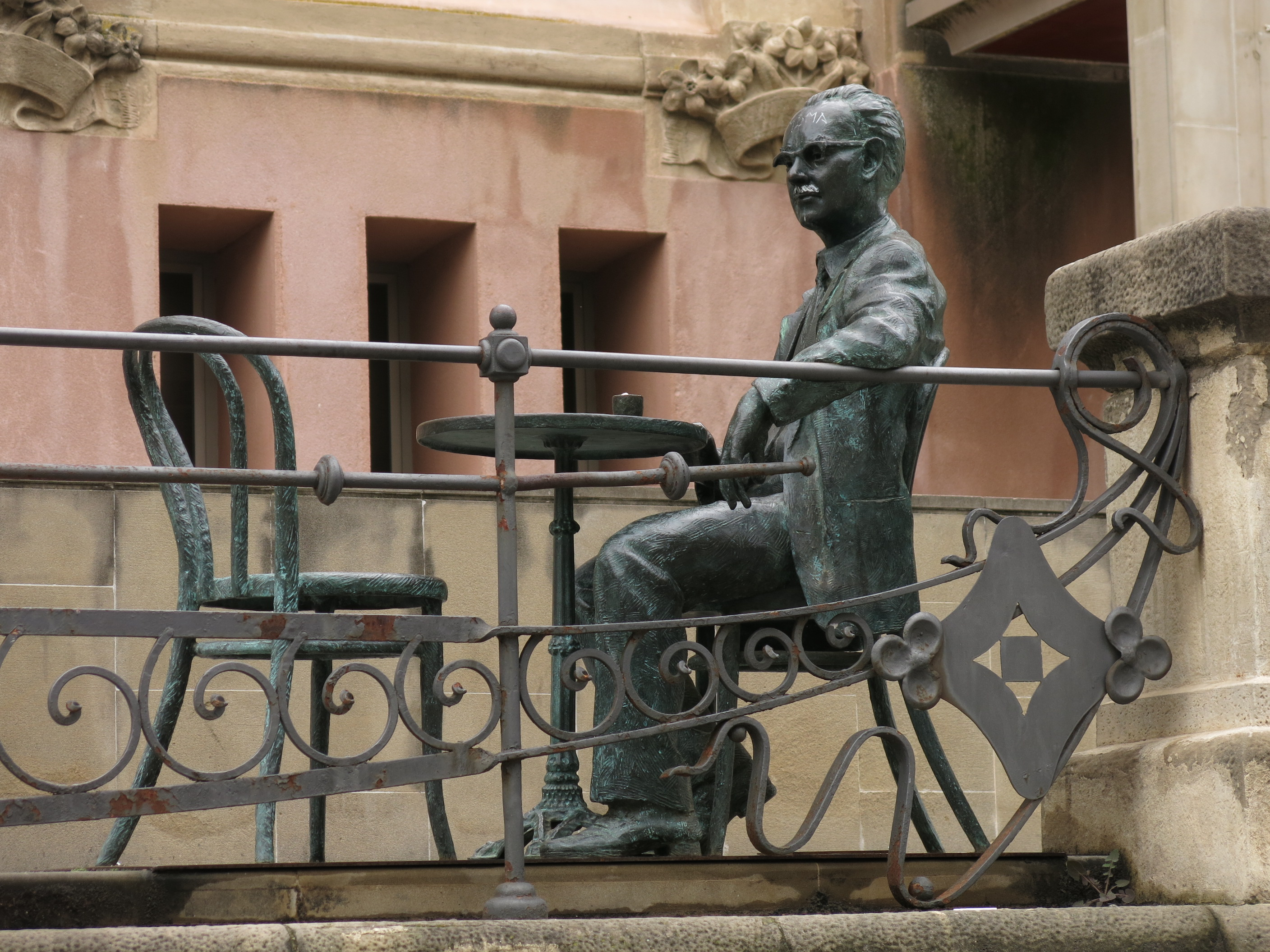
- Sculpture of Joaquim Amat-Piniella
- Born: Joaquim Amat-Piniella; November 22, 1913; Manresa
- Died: August 3, 1974 (aged 60); L'Hospitalet de Llobregat
- Occupations: writer and political activist
- Notable work: K.L.Reich

Joaquim Amat-Piniella (November 22, 1913 – August 3, 1974) was a Catalan writer. He is best known for his semi-autobiographic novel K.L. Reich, based on his experience as a prisoner in the Mauthausen concentration camp during the Second World War.

== Biography ==
=== Manresa ===
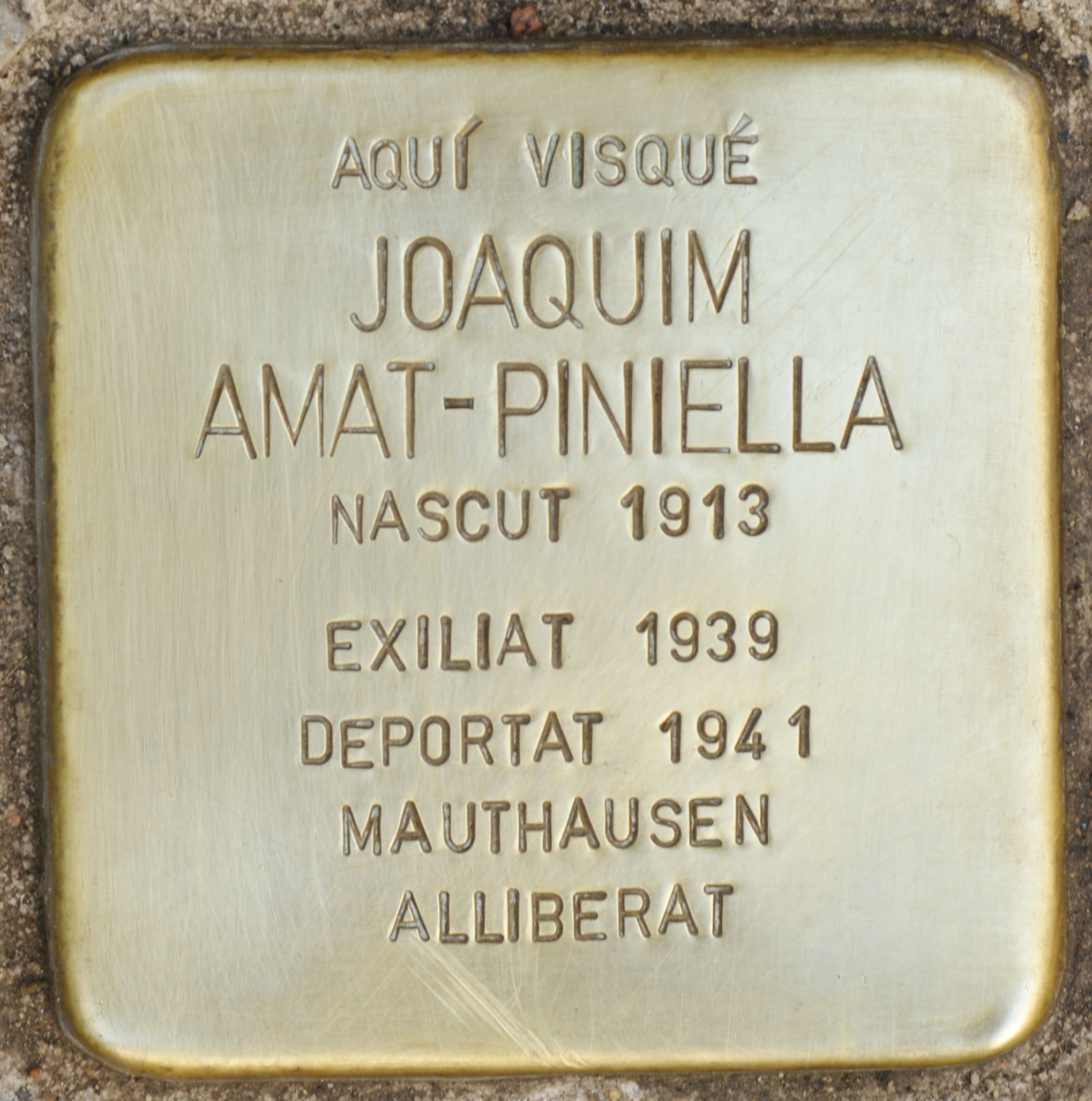
Memorial plaque in Manresa

Amat-Piniella was born in Manresa in 1913. His father, Joaquim Amat i Palà, was a confectioner and his mother, Concepció Piniella i Blanqué, was a teacher of music and a painter. He was educated at home by his parents before attending secondary school in Manresa and then beginning a law degree. Amat-Piniella began writing articles and essays at a young age and at the age of twenty he published his first novel. With the advent of the Spanish Second Republic, he threw himself into the political and cultural life of his home town. He became a member of Republican Left of Catalonia (Catalan: Esquerra Republicana de Catalunya) and in December 1932 he was appointed secretary to the mayor of Manresa. Following the Events of the 6 October (Catalan: Els fets del 6 d’Octubre) he, along with the mayor and councillors, was imprisoned in the Model Prison in Barcelona (Catalan: Presó Model de Barcelona). In February 1936, he was able to return to his post at the Town Hall, following the victory of the left-wing Frente Popular (Popular Front) coalition (in Catalonia and Valencia: Front d'Esquerres) in the Spanish general elections.

=== The Spanish Civil War ===
Following the outbreak of the Spanish Civil War, he gave up his law degree and volunteered to join the Republican army. He studied at the Artillery School in Barcelona and graduated after two months as a lieutenant. He saw action in Aragon, Andalusia and the province of Valencia. It was here that he found himself at the end of the Civil War. Unlike many of his fellow Republican soldiers, he was fortunate to possess civilian clothes and was able to return incognito to Catalonia. It was here that he married Maria Llaveries I Viladomiu, a teacher. However, aware of the danger he faced as a member of Esquerra Republicana and ex-Republican soldier, soon after their marriage he crossed the border into France, where he was interned by the French authorities in the Barcarès, Argelers and Sant Cebrià camps, along with tens of thousands of other Spanish Republican refugees. As a result of the extremely poor conditions in the camps, Amat-Piniella enlisted in a Company of Foreign Workers (French: Compagnie de travailleurs étrangers) in charge of reinforcing the French Maginot line along the Franco-German border. Following the German invasion of France in May 1940, Amat-Piniella and his companions fled towards the east and attempted to enter Switzerland on two occasions. However, they were expelled from the country and taken prisoner by the German forces. Initially, Amat-Piniella was imprisoned in the Bougenel (Belfort) barracks and then Fort Hatry, a camp for prisoners of war.

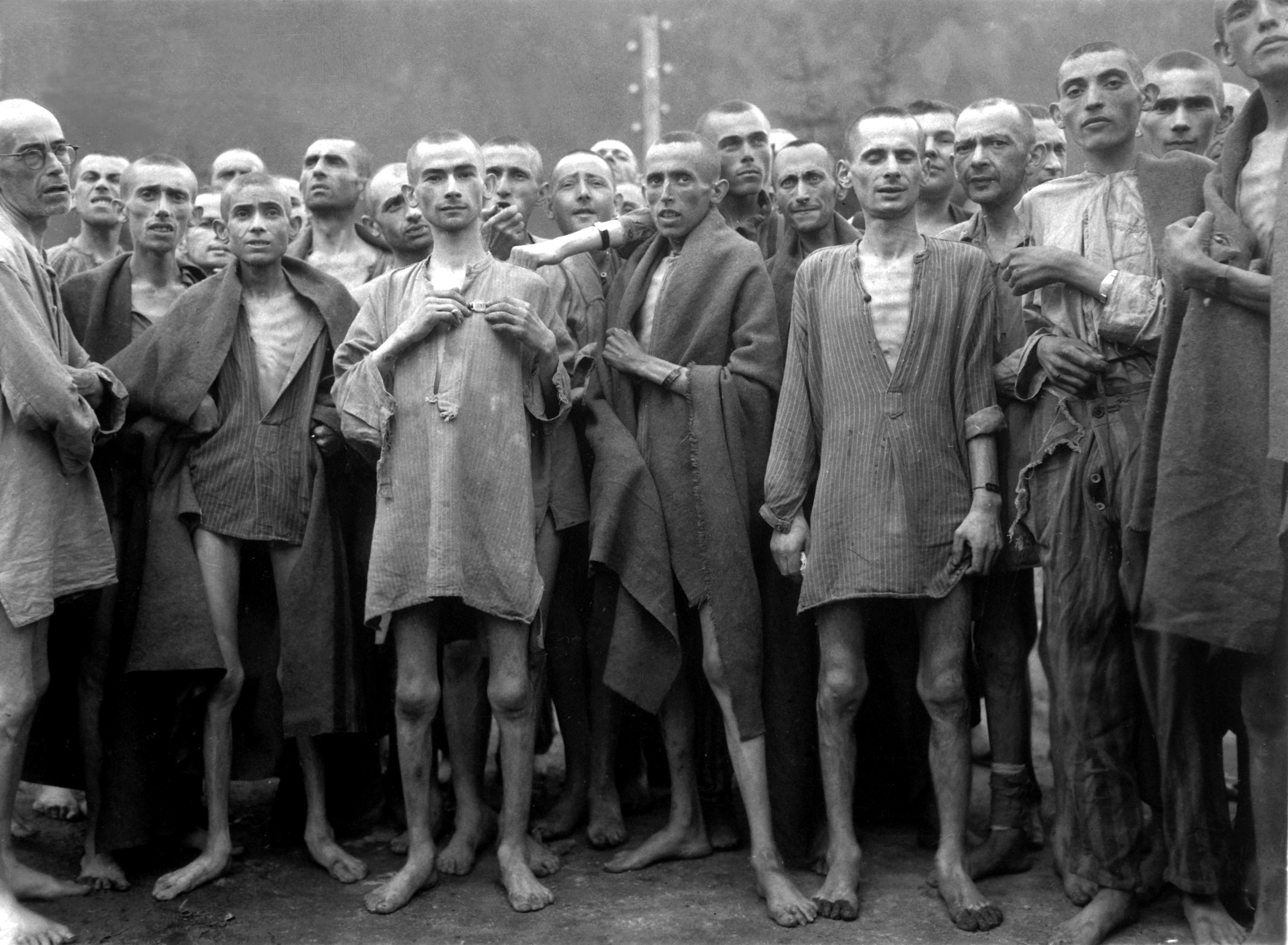
Ebensee concentration camp prisoners 1945

=== Mauthausen ===
However, the Republican prisoners were deemed to be stateless and Franco's minister and brother-in-law, Ramón Serrano-Suñer, made a deal with the Nazis whereby all Republican prisoners of war should be transferred to forced labour camps. Amat-Piniella and his fellow prisoners were moved to the Mauthausen concentration camp in January, 1941. In an interview in 1973, Amat-Piniella described his first contact in the camp with other Spanish prisoners who had been in the camp for a few months:

“…they were really skeletons. They looked pitiful. They said to us ‘this is what you’ll be like in a while’. They were completely undernourished, with their faces full of scabs and bruises from blows. All of them limped … They were poorly clothed, in rags, and (this) in very cold weather”.

Amat-Piniella was initially sent to work in the infamous quarry, where prisoners were literally worked to death. ‘Extermination through work” (Vernichtung durch Arbeit) entailed carrying heavy blocks of stone and climbing the 186 steps of the “stairs of Death”. He was saved by his friend Josep Cabrero Arnal, who had gained a relatively privileged position in return for producing pornographic drawings for a Nazi officer in the camp, and was able to procure employment for Amat-Piniella in the Effectenkammer, the camp's clothing warehouse. However, he was to be once again destined to the quarry, where he worked for several months in extremely harsh conditions. Fortunately, as a result of the intervention of some of his contacts, he was transferred to external Kommandos working for Austrian companies and set up by the Valencian anarchist César Orquín Serra, who had managed to convince the SS that the Spanish prisoners would be more productive if they were treated less harshly. Amat-Piniella was freed by US troops on 6 May 1945 at Ebensee, a satellite camp of Mauthausen, the day after the liberation of the main camp.

=== Andorra ===
After passing through Paris, Amat-Piniella settled temporarily in Sant Julià de Lòria (Andorra), where he completed Llunyanies (Distances), the collection of poems he had begun in Mauthausen and written on the paper of cement sacks. He also completed the first draft of his major work, K.L. Reich, a semi-autobiographical novel drawing on his experiences in the concentration camp. As a result of the censorship under the Franco regime, this work would remain unpublished until 1963.

=== Return to Catalonia ===
In 1948, he decided to end his exile and re-join his wife in Barcelona. Tragically, she was to die at the age of 37 in 1949, leaving behind their three-year-old son, Marcel. Following several unsuccessful business ventures, Amat-Piniella found employment as an accountant. In addition to working full-time, he managed to write four more novels during the 1950s and 1960s. However, as the author himself was to confess in an interview in 1966: “I don’t believe any of my novels achieved the power and authenticity of K.L. Reich”. He also co-founded, along with other deportees, the Amical de Mauthausen association in Barcelona in 1962. The Amical remained clandestine until it was legalised in 1978 with the end of Franco's dictatorship.

Joaquim Amat-Piniella died on 3 August 1974 in the Bellvitge Hospital in L’Hospitalet de Llobregat, near Barcelona.

== Works ==
=== Narrative ===
- Retaule en gris. Alzira: Bromera, 2012.

=== Novels ===
- El casino dels senyors. Barcelona: Albertí Editor, 1956 / Muro: Ensiola, 2013.
- Roda de solitaris. Barcelona: Albertí Editor, 1957 / Muro: Ensiola, 2010.
- La pau a casa. Barcelona: Albertí Editor, 1959 / Muro: Ensiola, 2013.
- K. L. Reich. Barcelona: Club Editor, 1963; 2006; 2013 / Barcelona: Edicions 62, 2001; 2005; 2010.
- La ribera deserta. Barcelona: Alfaguara, 1966 / Muro: Ensiola, 2013.
- La clau de volta. Barcelona: Club Editor, 2013.

=== Prose ===
- Ombres al calidoscopi. Manresa: Impremta Boixeda-Edicions Ara, 1933.

=== Poems ===
- Les llunyanies, poemes de l'exili (1940-1946). Barcelona: Columa-L'Albí, 1999.

=== Translations ===
- English: K. L. Reich. Ontario: Wilfrid Laurier University, 2014. (Translated by Robert Finley and Marta Marín-Dòmine)
- German: K. L. Reich. Viena: Czernin Verlag, 2016. (Translated by Kirsten Brandt)
- Spanish: K. L. Reich, Miles de españoles en los campos de Hitler. Barcelona: Seix-Barral, 1963. (Translated by Baltasar Porcel)

K. L. Reich. Barcelona: El Aleph, 2002; 2009 (ebook). (1946 Manuscript. Translated byAntonio Padilla)
