= Fred Gómez Carrasco =

American drug trafficker

Federico (or Alfredo) Gómez Carrasco (February 10, 1940 – August 3, 1974; "El Señor") was an American drug baron of Mexican descent. Based in Nuevo Laredo, Carrasco was the most powerful heroin kingpin in South Texas during his prime in the late 1960s and early 1970s. He has been cited as the "biggest and deadliest drug lord on the Texas-Mexico border, overseeing a cocaine and heroin empire that stretched from Guadalajara to San Diego, California, and Chicago, Illinois." He was described as a "slightly overweight Mexican man of average height, perhaps a little taller than most Mexican men," who never smiled, and although only 34, was already referred to as "El Viejo" (The Old Man) due to his experience in drug dealing. In Gilb's Hecho en Tejas, he states that "more corridos have been written about Carrasco than Gregorio Cortez".

Carrasco was born in San Antonio, Texas, in 1940. He served two years in prison on a murder without malice conviction from 1958. He was arrested in Guadalajara in September 1972 after being found in possession of 213 pounds of heroin worth over $100 million. However, by December 1972, Carrasco escaped in Jalisco in a laundry truck after bribing the authorities. He was arrested again in July 1973 in San Antonio, Texas, surviving four gunshot wounds fired at him by police. He was also charged with killing a police officer and was suspected of murdering at least 47 people. From July 24 to August 3, 1974, Carrasco unsuccessfully attempted to escape from Huntsville Prison in Huntsville, Texas, during an armed takeover. Carrasco's attorney, Ruben Montemayor, attempted to mediate the 11-day siege, the longest in prison history. Carrasco killed himself after a ten-minute gun battle with law enforcement. Texas Bureau of Vital Statistics, September 30, 2026 Suzanne Oboler, professor of Latin American studies at the City University of New York, considers the imprisonment of Gómez Carrasco and others such as Jimmy Santiago Baca, Ricardo Sánchez, Raúl Salinas, Modesta Avila, Judy Lucero and Alvaro Luna Hernandez to be "inextricably linked to colonial domination and the subsequent struggle for material resources in the southwestern United States", rather than being purely about drug dealing and murdering. The consensus among law enforcement officials is that Carrasco is known to have murdered at least forty-eight people (including Elizabeth Beseda, the librarian he shot on August 3, 1974) during and after his rise to power and that he did so for monetary gain, prestige, and power in the Mexican/American drug trade.
