= June 1974 =

Month of 1974

<<	June 1974					>>
Su	Mo	Tu	We	Th	Fr	Sa
						1
2	3	4	5	6	7	8
9	10	11	12	13	14	15
16	17	18	19	20	21	22
23	24	25	26	27	28	29
30

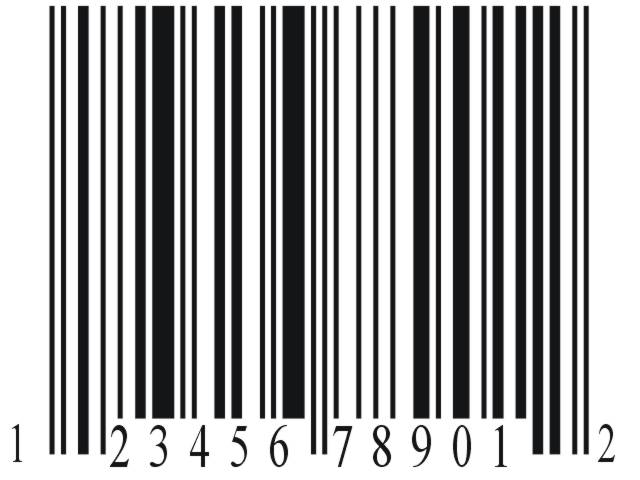
June 26, 1974: UPC bar code used for the first time in a purchase

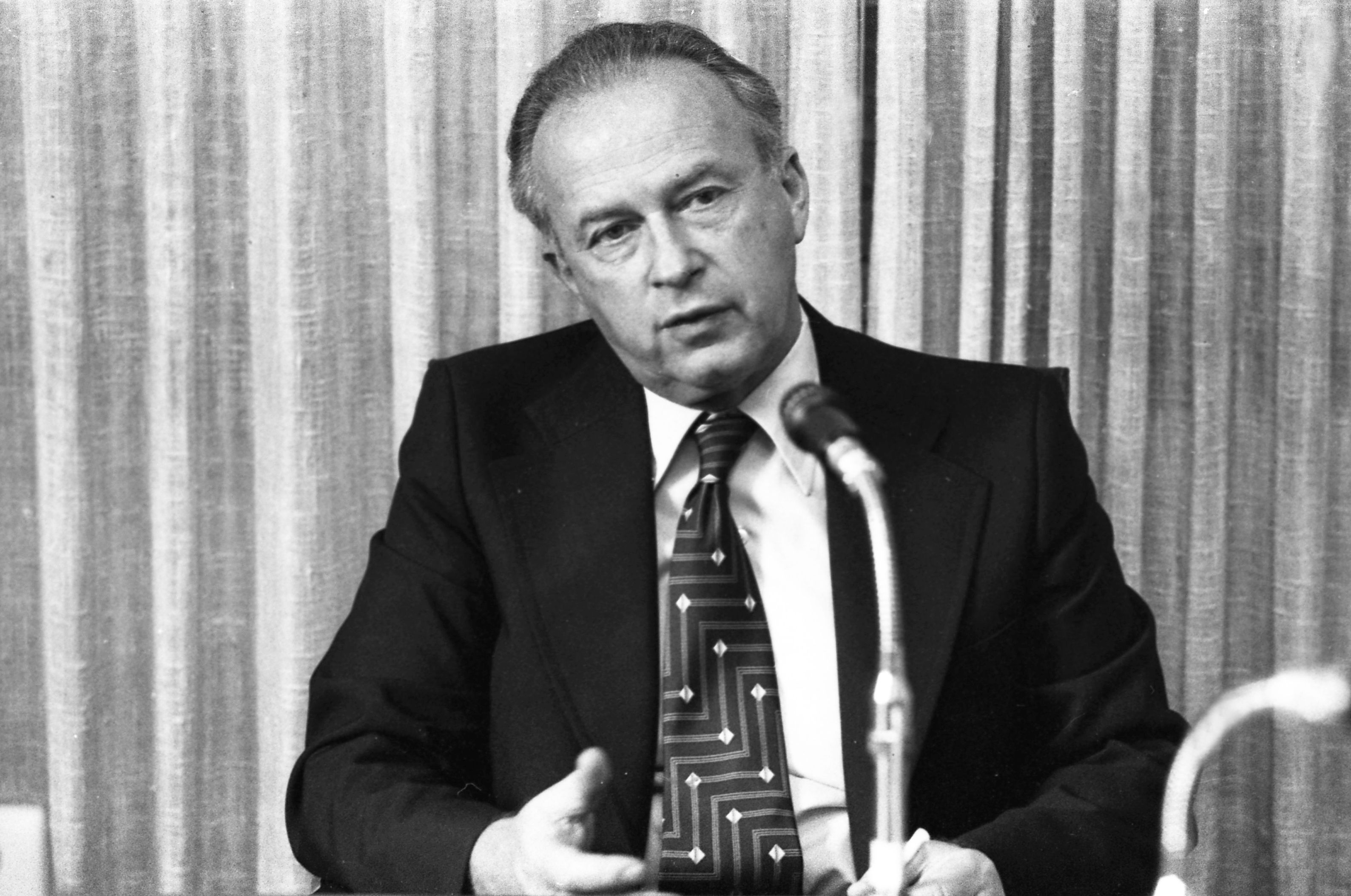
Yitzhak Rabin becomes the new Prime Minister of Israel after proposed government approved

The following events occurred in June 1974:

== June 1, 1974 (Saturday) ==
- The U.S. medical magazine Emergency Medicine published "Pop Goes the Cafe Coronary", an informal article by thoracic surgeon Henry Heimlich, describing the effective use of abdominal thrusts to dislodge an object blocking an airway to save a person choking on food. On June 11, Arthur Snider, science columnist for the Chicago Daily News wrote about Dr. Heimlich's findings, opening with the sentence, "A leading surgeon invites the public to try a method he has developed for forcing out food stuck in the windpipe of persons choking to death," in a story reprinted nationwide, and on June 19, 1974, the Seattle Post-Intelligencer reported that retired restaurant owner Isaac Piha, who had read the Snider article in the Seattle paper, used the procedure to rescue a choking victim, Irene Bogachus, in Bellevue, Washington, a story reprinted in other newspapers.
- A chemical plant explosion in England killed 28 people and seriously injured 36 others. The blast from the ignition of liquid cyclohexane occurred at 4:53 in the afternoon at the Nypro chemical fertilizer factory, near the village of Flixborough, North Lincolnshire, after chemical engineers discovered a leak in one of the plant's six reactors and bypassed it rather than shutting down operations.
- The government of Peru outlawed the Acción Popular political party that had been founded by former president Fernando Belaunde Terry and ordered the deportation of the party's leader, Javier Alva Orlandini.
- The live album June 1, 1974 was recorded at the Rainbow Theatre, London. The main performers were Kevin Ayers, John Cale, Brian Eno and Nico.
- One of the most popular Indian films of the year, the Tamil language drama Thangappathakkam, was released in theaters.
- Born: Alanis Morissette, Canadian alternative rock singer, and 1996 Grammy Award Album of the Year winner for Jagged Little Pill; in Ottawa.

== June 2, 1974 (Sunday) ==
- The coronation of Jigme Singye Wangchuck as King of Bhutan took place in an elaborate Buddhist ceremony at Thimphu, the capital of the Himalayan kingdom. Jigme Singye had succeeded to the throne on July 24, 1972, upon the death of his father, Jigme Dorji Wangchuck. Royal astrologers had determined that the coronation itself should take place at exactly 9:10 in the morning (UTC 0310) local time.
- At least 34 of the 277 people on the Philippine inter-island ship Aloha were killed when the vessel caught fire and sank in the Sulu Sea.
- Algeria became the first of the Arab OPEC nations to split with the rest of the Arab world, and ended its partial embargo on the export of oil to the Netherlands, almost eight months after curtailing oil production in October.
- Luna 22, an exploratory probe launched form the Soviet Union on May 29, entered orbit around the Moon and would return photographs and data until September 2, 1975.
- The African National Council rejected proposals agreed upon by Bishop Abel Muzorewa and Ian Smith for a settlement in Rhodesia.
- Voters in the West African nation of Mali overwhelmingly approved a new constitution to allow direct election of the president and a unicameral national assembly.
- Born: Gata Kamsky, Soviet-born American chess grandmaster and five-time U.S. chess champion; in Novokuznetsk, Russian SFSR, Soviet Union

== June 3, 1974 (Monday) ==
- Yitzhak Rabin became the fifth Prime Minister of Israel after the Knesset, by a margin of 61 to 51, voted confidence in the ministers selected for his coalition government. Born in Jerusalem on March 1, 1922, Rabin was the first premier to have been born in what would become Israel, the other three having been born in Eastern Europe before immigrating to Palestine.
- After a 40-day minesweeping operation, the U.S. Navy command office at Ismailia declared that the Suez Canal had been cleared of all active mines.
- Peruvian Army Brigadier General Gonzalo Briceño Zevallos arrived at the Golan Heights as the first commander of the United Nations Disengagement Observer Force (UNDOF), to oversee the 80-kilometre (50 mi) long UNDOF zone around the Purple Line separating Israeli and Syrian forces.
- The American military presence in the southeast Asian kingdom of Laos ended after 15 years, as the last three U.S. military personnel arrived in Thailand on the final Air America flight.
- The Himalayan 21,467-foot (6,543 m) high mountain Shivling was climbed for the first time, scaled by a team of mountaineers of the Indo-Tibetan Border Police, led by Hukam Singh.
- Third-seeded Björn Borg won the men's singles and first-seeded Chris Evert won the women's singles of the Italian Open tennis tournament.
- Born:
  - Ahmed Khan, Indian film choreographer; in Pune, Maharastra state
  - Gianluca Gauzzi Broccoletti, Italian law enforcement officer and Director of Security Services and Civil Protection of the Vatican City state since 2019; in Gubbio, Perugia.
- Died:
  - Octavio Muciño, 24, Mexican footballer and centre-forward for the Mexico national team, died three days after being fatally shot by Jaime Muldoon Barreto, who fled the scene and would never stand trial for the crime.
  - Michael Gaughan, 24, Provisional Irish Republican Army member and bank robber who had been on a hunger strike since March at Parkhurst prison.

== June 4, 1974 (Tuesday) ==
- The infamous "Ten Cent Beer Night" promotion at the Cleveland Stadium, for a game between the Cleveland Indians and the visiting Texas Rangers degenerated into a riot by drunken fans. With the price of 12-ounce (355 ml) cups of low-alcohol Stroh's beer reduced from 65 cents to 10 cents (equivalent in 2023 to 60 cents), servings of as many as six cups at time, and no limit to the number of purchases that could be made, the game attracted 25,134 paying customers, twice as many as expected. In the ninth inning, with the score tied, 5 to 5, an inebriated teenager ran onto the field and attempted to steal the cap off of one of the Rangers outfielders, Jeff Burroughs, who stumbled. The rest of the Rangers team, thinking Burroughs had been attacked, rushed to the outfield, and an estimated 200 fans came out of the stands to confront the visiting team. The Indians team grabbed bats to defend the besieged Rangers, and the umpiring crew ordered the game to be forfeited to Texas, which was credited with a 9 to 0 win under MLB rules at the time. Cleveland police arrested nine fans.
- Construction began of the first Space Shuttle, OV-101, later given the name Enterprise, with Rockwell International building the test vehicle to specifications and finishing construction by September 17, 1976.
- The 22,520 feet (6,860 m) Changabang mountain was climbed for the first time. The peak, located in the Indian state of Uttarakhand, was scaled by a team led by Indian Army Lieutenant Colonel Balwant Sandhu and by British mountaineer Chris Bonington.
- Keo Sangkim, the Minister of Education for the Khmer Republic (Cambodia), and former Education Minister Thach Chea, were killed in a school building at Phnom Penh after being taken hostage by students.
- Born: Jacob Sahaya Kumar Aruni, Indian celebrity chef; in Uthamapalayam, Tamil Nadu state (died 2012 of a heart attack)
- Died:
  - Mamerto Urriolagoitía, 78, President of Bolivia from 1949 to 1951
  - Pon Sivakumaran, 23, Sri Lankan rebel and the first Tamil independence martyr, attempted to rob a branch of the People's Bank in Kopay, then swallowed a cyanide capsule after being caught by police.

== June 5, 1974 (Wednesday) ==
- Mario Soares, at the time Portugal's Foreign Minister, met with Mozambican guerrilla leader Samora Machel, president of FRELIMO (Frente de Libertação de Moçambique) as the two were hosted by Zambia's President Kenneth Kaunda at Lusaka. At the time, Mozambique was under colonial rule as Portuguese East Africa, and the war between Portugal and the FRELIMO guerrillas had continued for more than a decade.
- Bolivian Army Generals Gary Prado Salmón and Raúl López Leyton attempted a coup d'etat against the military dictatorship of President Hugo Banzer Suárez, but failed. General Prado led a column of tanks into La Paz and surrounded the presidential palace after smashing its wrought-iron gates, but General Banzer's foot soldiers encircled the rebels and forced a surrender. Banzer was at a celebration in Bolivia's second capital, Sucre when the palace was attacked. General Lopez failed to take over the La Paz International Airport. In 1978, Prado would later be appointed by the new President, General David Padilla, as Minister of Planning and Coordination.
- Born:
  - Sonia I. Seneviratne, Swiss climate scientist; in Lausanne
  - Chad Allen (stage name for Chad Allen Lazzari), American TV actor and teen idol, later a psychologist; in Cerritos, California
  - Bhaskarabhatla Ravi Kumar, Indian songwriter for Telugu cinema with lyrics for almost 400 songs in 125 films; in Srikakulam, Andhra Pradesh state
  - Martine Moïse, First Lady of Haiti as wife of President Jovenel Moïse from 2017 until his assassination in 2021; in Port-au-Prince

== June 6, 1974 (Thursday) ==
Coat of arms of the Malta Knights' sovereign state

- Italy confirmed its diplomatic recognition to the Knights of Malta (unrelated to the Republic of Malta) as a "foreign state", despite the Order's lack of territory beyond the Palazzo Malta and the Villa del Priorato di Malta, both surrounded by the city of Rome, and the Order's embassies to Italy and to the Holy See (Vatican City). The Corte suprema di cassazione, the nation's supreme court, ruled that "the Sovereign Military Hospitaller Order of Malta constitutes a sovereign international subject, in all terms equal, even if without territory, to a foreign state with which Italy has normal diplomatic relations," based upon treaties made between the Order and the Kingdom of Italy in 1884, 1915, and 1938, and with the Italian Republic in 1956.
- As part of the ceasefire agreement between Israel and Syria, the last 382 Syrian prisoners of war were returned from Israel to Damascus on a jumbo jet chartered by the International Red Cross while the remaining 56 Israeli POWs arrived at Tel Aviv after being released by Syria.
- Eight people were killed in the collapse of a Gibson's Discount Store in Forrest City, Arkansas, and 75 others injured when a tornado leveled the building.
- France's new Prime Minister, Jacques Chirac, won his first test of strength when the French Assembly voted confidence in his government of ministers by a margin of 297 to 181.
- Born:
  - Guillaume Musso, French novelist known for the thriller Et Apres ("Afterwards"), adapted to the film of the same name; in Antibes, Alpes-Maritimes département
  - Uncle Kracker (stage name for Matthew Shafer), American rock and country singer; in Mount Clemens, Michigan

== June 7, 1974 (Friday) ==
- After 205 days (almost seven months), hunger strikers at Brixton Prison ended their refusal, since November 15, to voluntarily eat, in return for some concessions within the prison. Force feeding of the strikers had started on December 23.
- Born:
  - Mahesh Bhupathi, Indian tennis player who won the eight of the Grand Slam events mixed doubles tournaments between 1997 and 2009, and five Grand Slam doubles tournaments from 1999 to 2002; in Madras (now Chennai)
  - Edward "Bear" Grylls, Northern Ireland-born British adventurer; in Donaghadee, County Down
  - Giorgio Marengo, Roman Catholic cardinal who was elevated to the College of Cardinals at the age of 47 in 2022; in Cuneo
- Died: Abdul Rahman Hashim, 50, Royal Malaysia Police officer, and Inspector-General of Police since 1973, was assassinated in Kuala Lumpur.

== June 8, 1974 (Saturday) ==
- An outbreak of 36 tornadoes, at least 18 of them F2 or higher, killed 22 people. Of the dead, 12 lived in Drumright, Oklahoma and six more in Emporia, Kansas.
- All 44 people aboard Aerolíneas TAO Flight 514 were killed in Colombia when the Vickers Viscount 785 crashed into a mountainside during its approach to Cúcuta after departing from Bucaramanga. Metal fatigue caused the left tailplane and left elevator of the 16-year-old aircraft to fall off at an altitude of 7,000 feet (2,100 m).
- Jules Leger, the Governor General of Canada, suffered a stroke while dining at University of Sherbrooke and would be incapacitated for six months. During Leger's illness, the Chief Justice of the Supreme Court of Canada, Bora Laskin, performed the ceremonial duties of the Governor General as the Administrator of the Government of Canada.
- Representatives of the United States and Saudi Arabia signed a wide‐ranging military and economic agreement, the first between the U.S. and an Arab nation, in hopes of giving incentives to the Saudis to increase their oil production.
- Jon Pertwee made his last appearance as Doctor Who in the final episode of "Planet of the Spiders" and was replaced by Tom Baker.
- The Coupe de France, championship of the knockout tournament of French soccer football, was won by AS Saint-Étienne, 2 to 1, over AS Monaco, before 45,813 spectators at the Parc des Princes stadium in Paris. Saint-Étienne had finished in first place in Division I of the Ligue de Football Professionnel during the regular season, with a record of 23 wins, 9 draws and 6 losses.
- In the U.S., the rules committee of the NCAA approved a new rule of automatic disqualification for any athlete who made a false start in a college track and field race. The move came on the last day of the annual NCAA outdoor track and field championships and was prompted by the increasing problem of athletes moving forward before the start of a race.
- Born: Lauren Burns, Australian taekwondo competitor and 2000 Olympic gold medalist in the women's 49 kilogram competition; in Melbourne

== June 9, 1974 (Sunday) ==
- The South American nation of Colombia was recommended by the executive board of FIFA to host the 1986 World Cup, to be played during the month of June, 1986, after a successful bid by the Federación Colombiana de Fútbol. The decision required full approval of the FIFA delegates, who were meeting in Frankfurt, West Germany, in conjunction with the 1974 World Cup. By 1982, Colombia would have to cancel its plans because of a lack of progress in bringing stadiums in Bogotá, Cali, Barranquilla, Medellín and Bucaramanga and other infrastructure to meet FIFA requirements. The 1986 World Cup would instead be awarded to Mexico.
- Meeting in Egypt, the Palestinian National Council, legislative body for the terrorist Palestine Liberation Organization, voted to adopt the "Ten Point Program", including the establishment of an Arab-Palestinian state in the entire region of Palestine within the pre-1948 borders, and the return to their original homes of all Palestinian refugees who fled Israel.
- The new Northrop YF-17A American fighter jet made its first flight. The next day, it would become the first U.S. jet to break the sound barrier in level flight when not in afterburner.
- France's President Valery Giscard d'Estaing fired his Reform Minister, Jean-Jacques Servan-Schreiber, for denouncing the government for announcing that it would resume atmospheric nuclear testing in the Pacific Ocean.
- Portugal and the Soviet Union established full diplomatic relations for the first time. Portugal had withdrawn its ambassador almost 56 years earlier, in 1917, after the overthrow of the monarchy in Russia.
- Sporting CP defeated S.L. Benfica 2–1 to win the Taça de Portugal.
- Jody Scheckter won the 1974 Swedish Grand Prix at the Scandinavian Raceway.
- The newspaper comic strip Dotty Dripple, written by Buford Tune and similar to the older and more popular Blondie, ended slightly less than 30 years after its June 26, 1944, launch.
- Born: Samoth (stage name for Tomas Thormodsæter Haugen), Norwegian guitarist and black metal musician; in Hammerfest
- Died:
  - Miguel Ángel Asturias, 74, Guatemalan writer and 1967 Nobel Prize in Literature laureate for Hombres de maíz
  - Katherine Cornell, 81, German-born American stage actress

== June 10, 1974 (Monday) ==
- U.S. President Richard Nixon began a five-nation tour of Austria and the Middle East, as the presidential airplane, Air Force One, landed in Salzburg, along with his wife, Pat Nixon, and U.S. Secretary of State Henry Kissinger. Nixon was greeted on landing by Austria's Chancellor Bruno Kreisky and Foreign Minister Rudolf Kirchschlaeger, and then traveled by motorcade to his lodgings at the Schloss Klessheim palace.
- The United Nations Security Council approved its Resolution 351, recommending that the UN General Assembly admit Bangladesh as a member. Previous Security Council resolutions in 1972 and 1973 had been vetoed by the People's Republic of China in support of Pakistan, which had made peace with Bangladesh by 1974. Bangladesh was added to the General Assembly on September 17.
- Died: Prince Henry, Duke of Gloucester, 74, Governor-General of Australia from 1945 to 1947, and, as the son of King George V of the United Kingdom, the only member of the British royal family to hold the post.

== June 11, 1974 (Tuesday) ==
- Portugal's President Antonio de Spinola announced that his government would grant independence to Portugal's African colonies in Angola, Mozambique and Portuguese Guinea (later Guinea-Bissau, on the condition that ceasefires could be agree upon in the ongoing colonial wars, and if democratic voting would be guaranteed on the form of post-colonial government.
- Peru's space agency, CONIDA (Comisión Nacional de Investigación y Desarrollo Aeroespacial), which now operates and gathers data from its PeruSat-1 Earth observation satellite, was created in Lima by Decree Law 20643, issued by Peru's President, General Juan Velasco Alvarado.
- William Cann, Chief of Police for Union City, California, was fatally wounded by a sniper while speaking at a community meeting. He never regained consciousness after being struck in the neck by two .30 caliber bullets and died on August 29.
- Dr. Christoph Staewen, a West German physician who was taken hostage by Chadian rebels on April 21, 1974, was released, unharmed, after payment of a ransom of 2,500,000 Deutschmarks by the West German government.
- Bill Clinton, a 27-year-old law professor at the University of Arkansas, won his first election, the Democratic Party runoff for the nomination for U.S. Representative of the Arkansas Third District, defeating state senator Gene Rainwater. Bill Clinton and W. E. "Gene" Rainwater had been the top two finishers in a May 28 election. The future U.S. President would lose in November to the incumbent, Congressman John Paul Hammerschmidt.
- Died:
  - Eurico Gaspar Dutra, 91, President of Brazil from 1946 to 1951
  - Julius Evola, 76, Italian philosopher
  - Percy Correll, 82, British Antarctic explorer on Douglas Mawson's expedition from 1911 to 1914

== June 12, 1974 (Wednesday) ==
- Four inexperienced adventurers were rescued after 43 days of being marooned on the uninhabited Middleton Reef in the South Pacific Ocean, 300 miles (480 km) from Australia. Welsh skipper Irfon Nicholas, Australians Peter Lindenmayer and Christine Braham, and New Zealander Geraldine Yorke had departed from Auckland on April 7 on Nicholas's yacht, Sospan Fach on a 1,280 miles (2,060 km) voyage from New Zealand to Australia when the vessel ran aground on the coral reef April 28. They lived for the next seven weeks on cans of food from the yacht, as well as rainwater and distilled seawater, before being spotted by the Australian fishing trawler Ata, which had taken shelter near the reef during a storm. Marine authorities said the voyage was "one of the worst-prepared ever to leave New Zealand" and that Nicholas had only two hours of sailing experience at the time that he departed.
- East-West United Bank (Banque Unie Est-Ouest) was established in Luxembourg as the Western European subsidiary of the Soviet Union's government-owned Gosbank.
- Citing "the changing social climate" in the U.S., Little League Baseball, Inc., by its CEO, Peter J. McGovern, announced from its headquarters in Williamsport, Pennsylvania, that it would allow girls to enroll in the baseball program formerly limited to boys from 4 to 16 years old. The Board of Trustees of the Little League Foundation, and the Board of Directors of the corporation voted that girls would be allowed in the program, but that "Whether they play or not would depend on managers and coaches of the individual teams. The girls would have to provide equal competency in baseball skills, physical endowments and other attributes scaled as a basis for team selection."
- President Ferdinand Marcos of the Philippines offered full amnesty to all Muslim rebels in the Mindanao-Sulu region of the Asian nation, conditioned on each individual's laying down of arms and agreement to negotiate with the Philippine government.
- Rioting began in the South Jamaica section of Queens in New York City, after NYPD policeman Thomas Shea was acquitted of all charges arising from his fatal shooting of Clifford Glover, a 10-year-old African-American child, on April 28, 1973. Over the next few days, 10 civilians and 14 policemen were injured.
- Under pressure from leaders of the Peronist party in Argentina, the entire cabinet of President Juan D. Peron resigned in order to give, according to a presidential spokesman, "freedom to take whatever measures he considers necessary."
- U.S. President Nixon was greeted by a cheering crowd estimated at two million people in Egypt as he and his wife were escorted in a motorcade through the streets of Cairo.
- The National Hockey League awarded expansion franchises for the 1976–77 NHL season to Denver and to Seattle. After failing to secure financing, however, the Seattle Totems and the proposed Denver team would lose their proposed NHL franchises. Another NHL team, the Kansas City Scouts, would move to Denver in 1976 as the Colorado Rockies and Seattle would get a franchise 45 years later with the Seattle Kraken in 2021.
- Born:
  - Hideki Matsui, Japanese baseball player; in Neagari, Ishikawa
  - Jason Mewes, American film actor known for portraying Jay in Jay and Silent Bob; in Highlands, New Jersey
  - Denis Simachev, Russian fashion designer; in Moscow, Russian SFSR, Soviet Union"
- Died:
  - André Marie, 76, Prime Minister of France from July 26 to September 5, 1948
  - Herb Coleman, 46, American singer for the Delta Rhythm Boys was shot to death after a concert at the Palm Beach Casino in Cannes on the French Riviera. Coleman had been attempting to stop a drunken man who was "playing Russian roulette with a large caliber revolver."

== June 13, 1974 (Thursday) ==
- In the Yemen Arab Republic (commonly called North Yemen), a military coup d'etat led by Lieutenant-Colonel Ibrahim al-Hamdi overthrew the government of President Abdul Rahman al-Iryani. Iryani went into exile in Syria. Hamdi worked on modernizing North Yemen but would be assassinated in 1977.
- In his capacity as Earl of Chester, Prince Charles, the future King Charles III of the United Kingdom, delivered his first speech in the House of Lords, becoming the first royal to speak from the floor of the House since Albert, Duke of Saxony, the future King Edward VII, had spoken in 1884.
- Richard Nixon became the first U.S. President to visit Saudi Arabia, where he was greeted in Jiddah by King Faisal, but not by large crowds similar to the millions who had welcomed him to Egypt.
- The 1974 FIFA World Cup, with 16 teams in four groups, opened at 5:00 in the afternoon in West Germany with a match between Yugoslavia and Brazil before 62,000 people at the Waldstadion in Frankfurt. The teams, both of which would advance to the second round, played to a 0-0 draw.
- The National Ballet of Washington, D.C., the ballet of the United States, ended operations, 12 years after its launch on January 3, 1962.
- Born:
  - Selma (stage name for Selma Björnsdóttir), Icelandic singer and actress known for LazyTown; in Reykjavík
  - Babatope Agbeyo, Nigerian businessman and philanthropist; in Usi-Ekiti
  - Steve-O (stage name for Stephen Glover), English stunt performer, comedian and TV star; in Wimbledon, London
- Died:
  - Sholom Secunda, 79, Russian-born Jewish American composer
  - George Frazier, 63, American news columnist and entertainment critic, died of lung cancer.

== June 14, 1974 (Friday) ==
- The Lunar Surface Magnetometers placed on the Moon by the Apollo 12 mission (at the Oceanus Procellarum in 1969) and the Apollo 15 mission (at the Palus Putredinis lava plain on the edge of the Mare Imbrium in 1971) were deactivated by NASA.
- A converted U.S. Navy vessel with 10 people aboard, the privately owned boat Shooting Star, disappeared in heavy seas in the Pacific Ocean off the coast of Mexico, after issuing two distress calls before midnight the evening before. Debris from the Shooting Star were located three days later with no signs of life.

== June 15, 1974 (Saturday) ==
- After the death of Kevin Gately, members of the British National Front marched through London's West End, while the London Area Council for Liberation conducted a counter-demonstration. Kevin Gately died during the protests in Red Lion Square, the first demonstrator to be killed in Britain since 1919, leading to a public inquiry conducted by Lord Scarman.
- Gaston Thorn took office as the new Prime Ministers of Luxembourg after having been appointed by Jean, Grand Duke of Luxembourg on June 1.
- The USC Trojans baseball team defeated the Miami Hurricanes, 7 to 3, to win their fifth consecutive College World Series.
- Born: Chakri (stage name for Gilla Chakradhar), Indian composer for Telugu cinema; in Kambalapalli, Andhra Pradesh state (d. 2014)

== June 16, 1974 (Sunday) ==
- In the Soviet Union, elections were held in a yes-or-no vote of Communist Party-approved candidates for the two houses of the national parliament, the Supreme Soviet. Pre-printed ballots with the candidates for the electoral district were provided for each voter, who could simply drop the paper into a ballot box if voting "yes," but would have to mark the ballot if voting "no." All 767 seats of the Soviet of the Union and all 750 seats of the Soviet of Nationalities were approved by a reported turnout of more than 161 million voters.
- The 1974 24 Hours of Le Mans ended in a third consecutive victory for French drivers Henri Pescarolo and Gérard Larrousse.
- American golfer Hale Irwin won the U.S. Open tournament at Mamaroneck, New York, by two strokes over Forrest Fezler.
- The championship of soccer football in Greece, the Greek Football Cup, was won by PAOK Thessaloniki over Olympiacos of Piraeus on penalty kicks after the teams were tied at 2-2 at the end of extra time in regulation.
- The popular Brazilian Saturday afternoon TV program Clube do Bolinha began a run of almost 20 years, remaining on the air until May 7, 1994.
- The Milwaukee Road ended operation of its electric locomotives in Montana and Idaho. Trains over the Rocky Mountains were now solely powered by diesel.
- Born:
  - Alexandre Astier, French TV producer and actor, known as the creator and star of Kaamelott; in Lyon
  - Juraj Červenák, Slovak fantasy and mystery novelist; in Žiar nad Hronom, Czechoslovakia
  - Akhtar Raza Saleemi (pen name for Muhammad Pervaiz Akhtar), Pakistani novelist and poet; in Kekot, Khyber Pakhtunkhwa province
- Died: Kulap Saipradit (pen name Sriburapha), 69, Thai novelist and newspaper editor, died in exile 16 years after leaving Thailand to live in the People's Republic of China.

== June 17, 1974 (Monday) ==
- At 8:28 in the morning, a bomb exploded at the Houses of Parliament at Westminster Palace in London, setting off natural gas fires, causing extensive damage and injuring 11 people. An anonymous caller alerted the British Press Association six minutes before the blast, and security officials at Westminster evacuated persons inside the building. The Irish Republican Army claimed responsibility.
- General Augusto Pinochet, chairman of the four-man military junta that had taken control of Chile in 1973, was proclaimed "Supreme Chief of the Nation" ("Jefe Supremo de la Nación") by Decree Law No. 527, "Aprueba Estatuto de la Junta de Gobierno. He would formally be designated as President of the Republic on December 17.
- Died:
  - Leon H. Washington Jr., 67, African-American newspaper publisher and founder, in 1933, of the Los Angeles Sentinel
  - Sir Yadavindra Singh, 61, Indian Army Lieutenant-General, former maharaja of the princely state of Patiala from 1938 to 1971, and India's Ambassador to the Netherlands since 1971, died of heart failure at The Hague.
  - Sir Charles Keightley, 72, British Army general
  - Pamela Britton (stage name for Armilda Owens), 51, American stage, film and TV actress known for portraying Mrs. Brown on My Favorite Martian, and as the star of the TV adaptation of Blondie, died of brain cancer.
  - Refik Koraltan, 85, Turkish politician who served as Speaker of the Grand National Assembly of Turkey from 1950 to 1960 before being arrested following a coup d'etat, died of kidney failure.

== June 18, 1974 (Tuesday) ==
- Chile's secret police, the Dirección de Inteligencia Nacional (DINA), was created by Decree Law 521 from the ruling military junta headed by Augusto Pinochet, as "an intelligence-gathering organization" headed by Manuel Contreras, but which "quickly became the center of the state terror apparatus, with a string of secret detention and torture centers throughout the country.
- West Germany's law on abortion of pregnancy, which had been narrowly approved by the Bundestag on April 26, was signed into law by President Gustav Heinemann, to allow abortion in the first trimester of pregnancy. The amendment to the Fifth Criminal Law Reform Act would be challenged immediately in court, and on June 21, the Federal Constitutional Court ruled, 5 to 3 that the change in the law "shall not enter into force for the time being."
- West Germany's Bundestag passed its most broad consumer protection law up to that time, the Lebensmittel und Bedarfsgegenständegesetz (Law on Food and Commodities), providing for standards on labeling, safety and sanitation, and regulation of advertising and additives, applicable to food products as well as to tobacco and cosmetic products.
- Died:

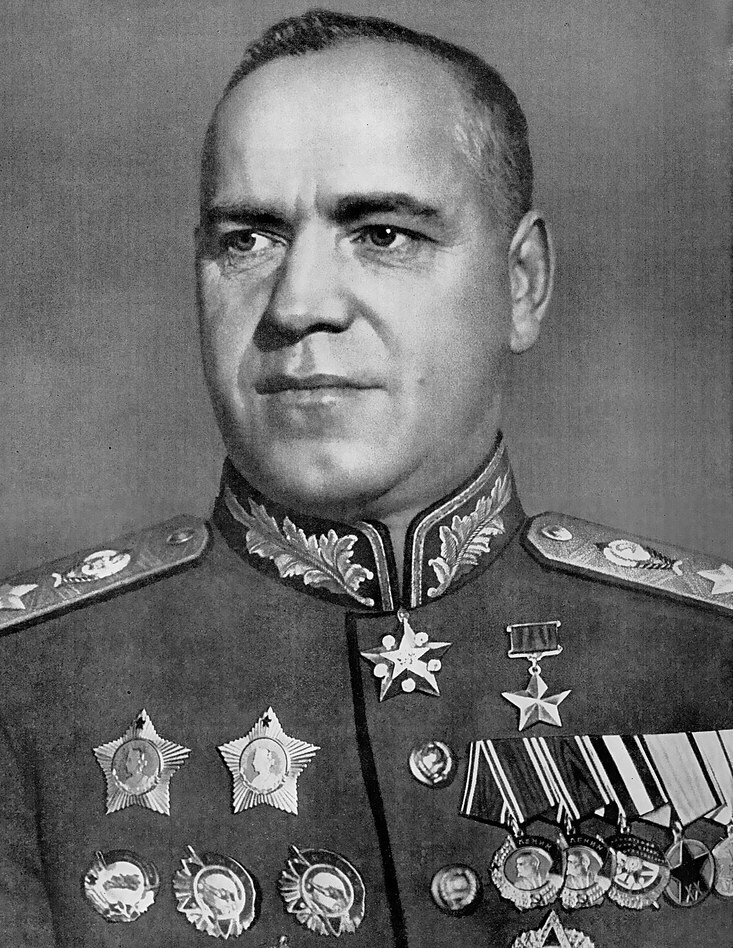
Marshal Zhukov

  - Marshal Georgy Zhukov, 77, Soviet general who was the commander of Soviet Red Army forces during World War II, died of a heart attack after six months hospitalization. Zhukov, described in the West as "The Eisenhower of Russia", was the only World War II hero to receive four Hero of the Soviet Union medals and had commanded Soviet forces from the defense of Moscow in 1941 to the capture of Berlin in 1945.
  - George Kelly, 87, American playwright, and winner of the Pulitzer Prize in 1925 for Craig's Wife

== June 19, 1974 (Wednesday) ==
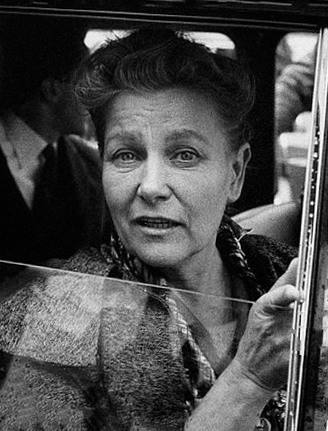
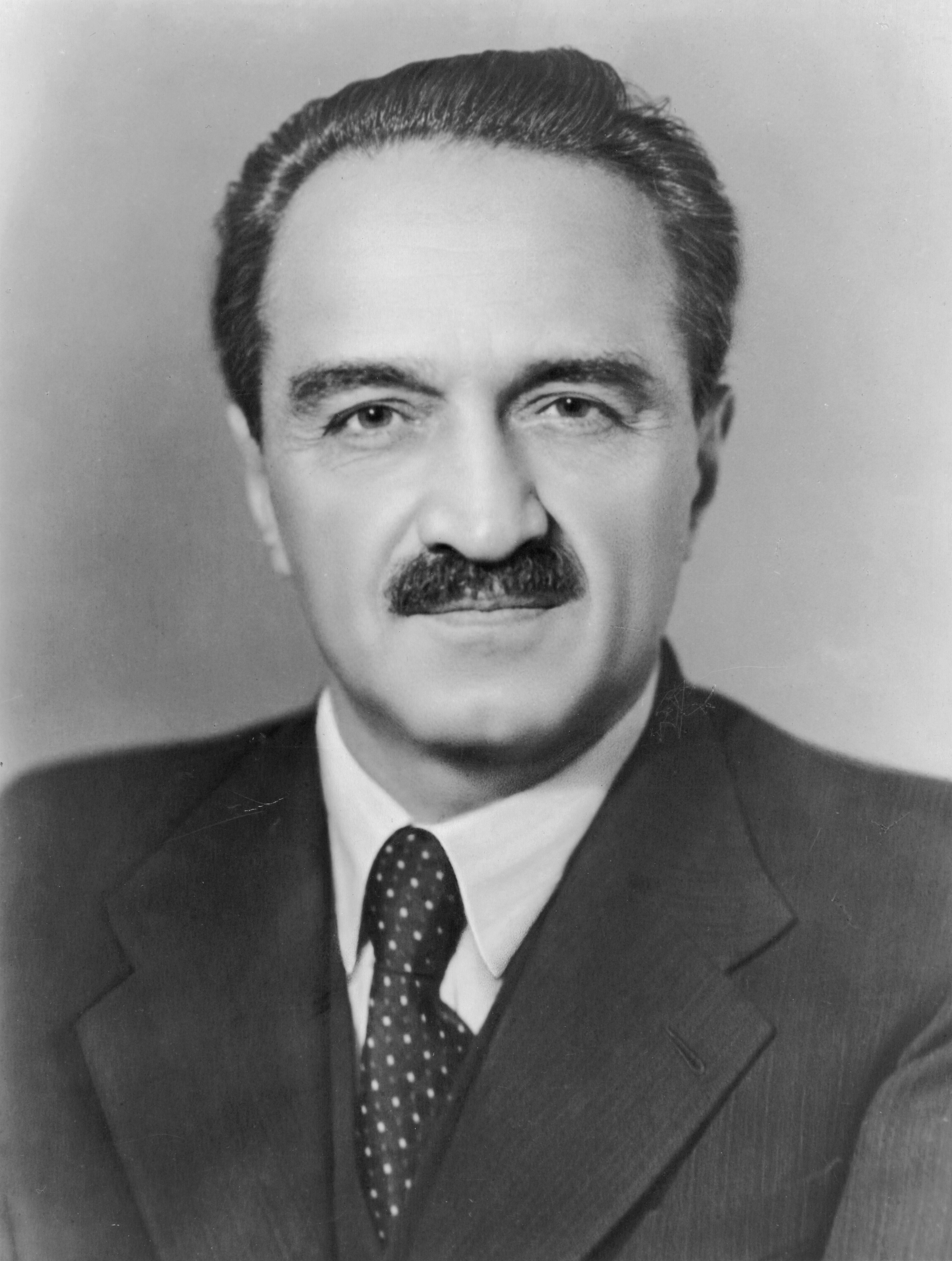
Furtseva and Mikoyan
- Pravda, the official newspaper of the Communist Party of the Soviet Union, revealed that two formerly powerful members of the party were not among the 1,517 persons elected as deputies to the Supreme Soviet in the June 16 yes-or-no elections, meaning that they had not been nominated in any of the electoral districts. Yekaterina Furtseva, the Soviet Minister of Culture since 1960 and a member of the CPSU's Central Committee, had once been the most influential woman in Soviet politics, but had been disciplined by the Party for extravagance and had been fined 40,000 rubles. Anastas Mikoyan, a member of the Central Committee since 1923, had been the Soviet head of state as Chairman of the Presidium of the Supreme Soviet from July 15, 1964 to December 9, 1965, but was forcibly retired at the age of 78. Furtseva would die later in 1974, and Mikoyan would die in 1978.

== June 20, 1974 (Thursday) ==
- The United Nations Conference on the Law of the Sea, largest international meeting in history up to that time, based on the number of nations participating, was opened Caracas in Venezuela by UN Secretary General Kurt Waldheim. Delegates from 147 countries gathered in a 10-week session described as "pitting the rich against the poor, the fishermen against the fished, the coastal states against the landlocked."
- Rejected by the medical school of the University of California at Davis, 34-year-old Allen Bakke filed the lawsuit that would lead to the 1978 U.S. Supreme Court decision banning "reverse discrimination".
- The reliability of the White House of transcripts the Watergate Tapes was called into question as the House of Representatives Judiciary Committee revealed that the editing by the White House had removed remarks that might suggest President Nixon had attempted to cover up the scandal. Most notably, a March 21, 1973 tape showed Nixon telling White House counsel John Dean, "Understand, I don't want it that goddamned specific,” in a report on a public about Watergate, and that when Dean mentioned paying "hush money" to conspirator E. Howard Hunt, Nixon said "We should, we should," and added "for Christ's sakes, get it." In another tape, Nixon told senior aides that if they testified, they should say that they had faulty memories, saying "Just be damned sure you say 'I don't remember; I can't recall; I can't give any honest answer to that I can recall."
- West Germany and East Germany exchanged permanent representatives to open formal relations with each other for the first time since being created as separate states after World War II. Michael Kohl of East Germany presented his credentials in Bonn to President Gustav Heinemann, and Günter Gaus of West Germany did the being received in East Berlin by President Willi Stoph. The lower house of West Germany's parliament voted, 232 to 190, to ratify a treaty to establish normal relations with its Communist neighbor, Czechoslovakia.
- The remains of 17th-century naval vessel HMS Anne, on the low water mark of the beach near Pett Level, East Sussex, were designated under the British Protection of Wrecks Act.
- Died:
  - Susana Brunetti, 32, Argentine film and TV actress, died of cancer.
  - Horace Lindrum, 62, Australian snooker and billiards player and 1952 world snooker champion, died of lung cancer.

== June 21, 1974 (Friday) ==
- Slightly more than 20 years after the landmark U.S. Supreme Court decision in Brown v. Board of Education, finding that de jure racial segregation of public schools was unconstitutional, U.S. District Judge W. Arthur Garrity held that the northeastern U.S. city of Boston, Massachusetts, had made an unconstitutional practice of de facto racial segregation of its schools, with 82% of Boston's black students in majority black schools. The ruling came in the case of Morgan v. Hennigan, filed in 1972 by the NAACP on behalf of 14 African-American families whose children were unable to attend predominantly white schools because of school zoning. Issuing his ruling on the last day of school in Boston, Judge Garrity ordered that Boston would need to desegregate its schools by busing children from black school districts to mostly white schools, and children from white districts to predominantly black schools. In a specific decision, Judge Garrity ordered that the classes of the mostly white South Boston High School would be integrated with the nearly all black Roxbury High School, with half of the sophomore class of each school to attend the other.
- A group of Ethiopian military officers organized the Coordinating Committee of the Armed Forces, Police and Territorial Army, generally referred to as the Derg, and selected Major Mengistu Haile Mariam as its leader. On September 12, the Derg would overthrow the Ethiopian imperial government and arrest longtime Emperor Haile Selassie, replacing it with a military junta led by Mengistu.

== June 22, 1974 (Saturday) ==
- For the first, and only time in soccer football, the national teams of West Germany and East Germany played against each other after both had been placed in Group 1. In the match played in Hamburg, part of the first round of the 1974 World Cup, East Germany won, 1-0, on a goal by Jürgen Sparwasser, over the heavily favored West German team (which would go on to win the 1974 World Cup). Finishing in first and second place in Group 1, both advanced to the second round.
- The Sears Tower in Chicago, at the time the tallest building in the world at 1,353 feet (412 m), opened its observation deck for the first time, with the public at the 103rd floor of the 110 story building.
- Born:
  - Vijay (stage name for Joseph Vijay Chandrasekhar) Indian film actor in Tamil cinema, known for Ghilli and Pokkiri; in Madras (now Chennai), Tamil Nadu
  - Devayani (stage name for Devayani Jayadev), Indian film and television actress in Tamil cinema; in Bombay (now Mumbai). Devayani and Vijay, born on the same day, were co-stars in the 1998 romance, Ninaithen Vandhai.
  - Dimitrios Giannakopoulos, Greek businessman, CEO of Vianex Pharmaceuticals and co-owner of Superfoods S.A.; in Athens
  - Joelma (stage name for Joelma da Silva Mendes), Brazilian pop singer; in Almeirim, Pará
  - Jo Cox (born Helen Joanne Leadbeater), British politician and Member of Parliament who was murdered while in office; in Batley, West Yorkshire (d. 2016).
- Died: Darius Milhaud, 81, French composer

== June 23, 1974 (Sunday) ==
- Austria's Foreign Minister Rudolf Kirchschläger defeated Alois Lugger, Mayor of Innsbruck in the nation's presidential election, by a margin of 51.7% to 48.3%. The election had been called to fill the remainder of the term of President Franz Jonas, who died on April 24.
- The skeletal remains of a retired MI-6 intelligence officer, Sir Peregrine Henniker-Heaton, the 3rd Baronet Henniker-Heaton, were found in an armchair in his home in the London suburb of Ealing, almost three years after he had last been seen alive. On October 5, 1971, Henniker-Heaton had gone out on a walk, came back to his home, and locked himself inside his study, where he apparently committed suicide.
- Born: Meg-John Barker, English psychotherapist and writer of self-help books on gender issues; in Hull, East Yorkshire

== June 24, 1974 (Monday) ==
- Palestinian terrorists infiltrated Israel by sea for the first time. Three members of the Fatah military group took to the Mediterranean Sea from Lebanon on an inflatable boat, powered by an outboard motor, then landed on the beach in Israel at the coastal city of Nahariya at 11:00 p.m. local time. Ten minutes later, they were spotted by a teenager who alerted the police before an attack could be carried out at a local cinema. Instead, they broke into a nearby apartment building, killing a woman and two children with a grenade. After being surrounded, the three men killed an Israeli soldier and wounded seven others. All three terrorists were killed in battle with Israeli security forces, who rescued 17 other civilians.
- The capsizing of a ferry boat in Pakistan killed 42 of the 65 people on board as the vessel was approaching Mirpur, Azad Kashmir during a storm, and overturned in the Poonch River.
- The Shtyki Memorial, near Zelenograd in the Soviet Union, part of a memorial complex created in honour of those who defended the country in the Battle of Moscow during World War II, was completed.

== June 25, 1974 (Tuesday) ==
- France's National Assembly approved the extension of adult rights and responsibilities to persons at least 18 years old, lowering the voting age from 21 to 18, but allowing persons 18 years old the right to do other things without permission from a parent or a guardian. In addition to the right to vote, France's Justice Minister Jean Lecanuet said, the law gave persons 18 to 21, for the first time, the right to choose where they could live, the right to get married without parental permission, the right to open a bank account, get a passport or travel abroad, set up a business, open a bank account, attend college and to purchase alcohol.
- The Salyut 3 space station was launched into orbit from the Soviet Union's Baikonur Cosmodrome at 10:15 a.m. local time (0415 UTC). Intended for military purposes, Salyut 3 circled the globe at an average altitude of 270 kilometres (170 mi).
- U.S. President Richard Nixon departed from Washington on his last foreign trip as president, and his second overseas tour of the month, flying to Brussels for a meeting of the leaders of the 15 member nations of the North Atlantic Treaty Organization (NATO) in Belgium. Following the NATO summit, he proceeded to a summit in Moscow with Soviet leader Leonid Brezhnev.
- A series of seven similar murders in 45 days around Tokyo began with the disappearance of a 30-year-old housewife in Matsudo, followed by killings on July 3, 10, 14 and 24 and on August 6.
- Born: Karisma Kapoor, Indian actress, daughter of Randhir Kapoor and Babita, in Mumbai

== June 26, 1974 (Wednesday) ==
- At 8:01 in the morning, the first purchase of a product with the Universal Product Code (UPC) was made, as 67 cent package of Wrigley's Juicy Fruit chewing gum was the first item in a shopping basket of items at the checkout aisle in a Marsh Supermarket in Troy, Ohio. The day after the National Cash Register company had installed the scanning equipment and staff of the supermarket had placed the UPC tags on hundreds of items in the supermarket, Marsh research director Clyde Dawson handed cashier Sharon Buchanan the package of 50 pieces of gum. The transaction marked the first use of barcode technology in American retailing.
- Former Soviet Army Major General Pyotr Grigorenko was released after five years confinement in various psychiatric hospitals, where he had been held without trial since 1969 after speaking out publicly against the Communist government. His freedom came as U.S. President Nixon was scheduled to arrive in Moscow for a summit.
- Police in Thailand rescued 54 children, most of them girls ranging in age from 9 to 15 years old, who had been used as slave labor in a blouse factory in Bangkok.
- One of the most profitable pornographic films in history, the French-language Emmanuelle, was shown in movie theaters for the first time, with a premiere in Paris.
- Born: Derek Jeter, American Major League Baseball shortstop for 20 seasons with the New York Yankees from 1995 to 2014, American League rookie of the year 1996, World Series MVP 2000, inducted into the Baseball Hall of Fame in 2020; in Pequannock Township, New Jersey
- Died:
  - Ernest Gruening, 87, American politician, the first U.S. Senator (along with Bob Bartlett) for the state of Alaska (1959 to 1969), after being the governor of the Alaska Territory 1939 to 1953. In 1964, Gruening had been one of only two U.S. Senators to vote against the Gulf of Tonkin Resolution.
  - Margaret Morse Nice, 90, American ornithologist and child psychology researcher

== June 27, 1974 (Thursday) ==
- Soviet leader Leonid Brezhnev welcomed U.S. President Richard Nixon to Moscow for the third summit between the two leaders, and then hosted him at a banquet at the Kremlin, where the two raised toasts to their personal friendship and for reaching detente between the two superpowers.
- Prime Minister Zulfikar Ali Bhutto became the first leader of Pakistan to visit Bangladesh, the former province of East Pakistan, which had seceded in 1971 and become independent after a bitter civil war. Bhutto was greeted by a crowd of 5,000 well-wishers upon arriving in Dhaka, the Bengali capital, and was greeted with a hug by his former bitter enemy, Bangladesh premier Mujibur Rahman. Although Bhutto made an apology on behalf of Pakistan for its treatment before independence of Bengali citizens, the first meeting ended with anger on both sides and no agreements on demands made by both sides.
- The Senate Watergate Committee (officially the U.S. Senate Select Committee on Presidential Campaign Activities), chaired by U.S. Senator Sam Irvin since its formation on February 7, 1973, published its seven-volume, 1,250-page "Report on Presidential Campaign Activities" and disbanded.
- The crash of a Cambodia Air Boeing 307 Stratoliner killed 19 of the 39 people on board. Three minutes after taking off from Battambang en route to Phnom Penh, the turboprop suffered the loss, in succession, of its number 1, 2 and 3 engines and made a forced landing in a rice field, crashed into a tree, and burst into flames.
- The 61st Tour de France began at Brest with individual time trials which were won by Belgium's Eddy Merckx of the 10-member Molteni team from Italy. The next day, 13 teams and their 130 riders began the race, which would run for 2,546 miles (4,097 km) and be won by Mercx on July 21, 1974.

== June 28, 1974 (Friday) ==
- In Ethiopia, at the time still ruled by the Emperor Haile Selassie, the new "Coordinating Committee of the Armed Forces" (known as "the Derg") seized the radio station in Addis Ababa, and began to arrest high officials, generals and other aristocrats suspected of being behind the reactionary movement.
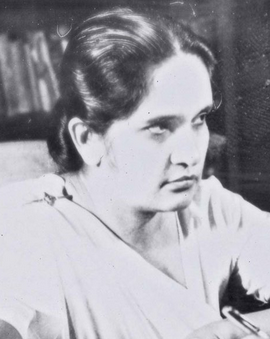
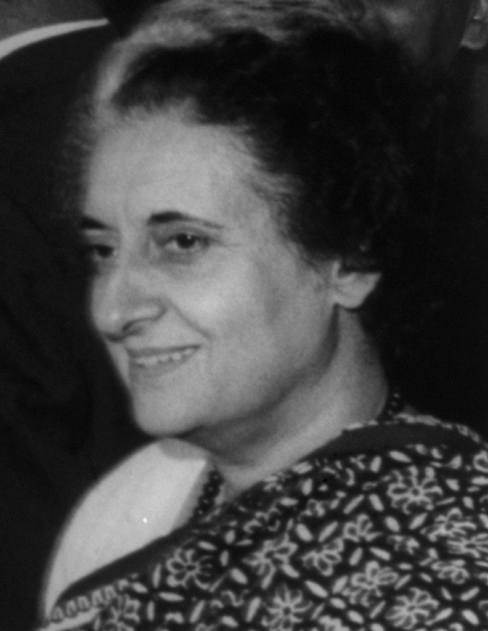
Prime Ministers Bandaranaike and Gandhi
- Sri Lanka's Prime Minister Sirimavo Bandaranaike and India's Prime Minister Indira Gandhi signed the Sirima–Gandhi Pact, agreeing that the 150,000 Indian Tamils in Sri Lanka whose status had been unresolved since a previous pact in 1964 would have the option to receive full Indian citizenship and be allowed to move to India, or granted full Sri Lankan citizenship if they opted to remain.
- A landslide in Colombia killed more than 200 people and injured 100 after burying a highway near the city of Villavicencio in the Meta Department, along with six buses filled with passengers and 14 other vehicles. Many who were not buried were swept off the road and into the Quebradablanca ravine, and 50 bodies were recovered in the first two days after the disaster.
- Real Madrid defeated Barcelona, 4-0, to win Spain's Copa del Generalísimo soccer football championship, held at the Vicente Calderón Stadium in Madrid. Barcelona had finished in first place in La Liga with a record of 21 wins, 8 draws and 5 losses while Real Madrid (13-8-13) had tied for eighth place.
- Born: Rob Dyrdek, American skateboarder, entrepreneur and reality television star known for MTV's Ridiculousness; in Kettering, Ohio
- Died:
  - Vannevar Bush, 84, American engineer, inventor and Director of the Office of Scientific Research and Development during World War II
  - Frank Sutton, 50, American actor best known for portraying "Sergeant Carter" on the TV comedy Gomer Pyle – USMC, died of a heart attack while preparing to go onstage for a play in Shreveport, Louisiana.

== June 29, 1974 (Saturday) ==
- Soviet ballet dancer Mikhail Baryshnikov defected while the Bolshoi Ballet tour was in Toronto, Canada, and requested political asylum in Canada.
- At a Soviet and American summit in Moscow, U.S. President Nixon and Soviet Union General Secretary Brezhnev signed a 10-year economic agreement. The two then flew on the same plane from Moscow to Simferopol in Crimea in the Ukrainian SSR, then rode in a car to Brezhnev's beach resort home at Oreanda, near Yalta.
- The March 24 secession of Tanna, southernmost of the New Hebrides islands, from the rest of the jointly administered "Anglo-French Condominium" was ended as British and French troops invaded the island. Tanna is now part of the Tafea Province of Vanuatu.
- Isabel Perón was sworn in as the first female President of Argentina replacing her sick husband, President Juan Perón, who would die two days later.
- Born: Vish Iyer, Indian-born American yoga guru, author and actor; in Madras (now Chennai), Tamil Nadu state
- Died: Xavier Guerrero, 77, Mexican mural painter

== June 30, 1974 (Sunday) ==
- Voting for parliament was held in Iceland for all 40 seats of the Lower House (Neðri deild) of the Althing, and 20 seats of the Upper House (Efri deild). The Sjálfstæðisflokkurinn (Independence Party) of Prime Minister Geir Hallgrímsson remained the largest, winning 17 seats, but no party obtained a majority.
- Voters in the Matanzas Province of the Communist nation of Cuba were given a choice of candidates in the first election held in the Caribbean island nation since 1958. The political experiment was limited to the Matanzas province and was for municipal government administrators described as delegates to the popular power assemblies. The Communist Party newspaper Granma announced that single-candidate "yes/no" lists were barred, with each neighborhood precinct to have at least two candidates nominated, and that voting would be by secret ballot, strictly voluntary, and for all citizens aged 16 or older.
- An arson fire killed 24 people at Gulliver's, a nightclub in Port Chester, New York. Most of the 200 patrons in the club evacuated calmly, but the victims were asphyxiated by heavy smoke while trying to leave the building. The fire injured 19 other customers and 11 firefighters.
- Died:
  - Alberta Williams King, 70, African-American musician and church leader and the mother of the late Martin Luther King Jr., was shot to death by Marcus Wayne Chenault while she was playing the organ at services in the Ebenezer Baptist Church in Atlanta. Chennault, an African-American religious zealot who was apparently planning to kill Dr. King's father, also killed a 69-year-old deacon, Edward Boykin.
  - Mule Haas (born George William Haas), 70, American Major League Baseball center fielder
  - Gregory Ruth, 34, American collegiate wrestler and NCAA champion 1965 and 1966, was killed in a powerboat racing accident.
