= Thomas Harris (disambiguation) =

Thomas Harris (born 1940) is an American author.

Thomas Harris may also refer to:

== Politicians ==
- Thomas Harris (Serjeant-at-Law) (1547–1610), English politician, MP for Truro, Callington, Portsmouth and Bossiney
- Thomas Harris (died 1622), MP for Maldon
- Thomas Harris (died 1628) (1550–1628), MP for Shrewsbury
- Thomas K. Harris (died 1816), US congressman from Tennessee
- Thomas L. Harris (1816–1858), U.S. Representative from Illinois
- Thomas Harris (British Columbia politician) (1817–1884), Canadian mayor of Victoria, British Columbia
- Thomas R. Harris (1836–1894), political figure in Nova Scotia, Canada
- Thomas Alexander Harris (1826–1895), Confederate politician & Missouri State Guard (Confederate) general
- Thomas Harris (Irish politician) (1895–1974), Irish politician

== Military ==
- Thomas Alexander Harris (1826–1895), Missouri State Guard (Confederate) general and Confederate congressman, American Civil War
- Thomas James Harris (1892–1918), English recipient of the Victoria Cross
- Thomas Maley Harris (1817–1906), Union Army general during the American Civil War
- Thomas Noel Harris (1785–1860), British Army officer who lost an arm at the Battle of Waterloo

== Sports ==
- Thomas Harris (aviator) (died 1824), early balloonist, who was killed in an accident in 1824
- Thomas Harris (rugby), English rugby union and rugby league footballer of the 1910s, and 1920s, for Cornwall (RU), Redruth R.F.C., England (RL), and Rochdale Hornets
- Thomas Harris (cricketer) (1845–1918), English cricketer

== Others ==
- Thomas Harris (architect) (1829–1900/30–1900), British architect
- Thomas Harris (diplomat) (1945–2021), British diplomat and banker
- Thomas Harris (surgeon) (1784–1861), U.S. Navy surgeon
- Thomas Harris (theatre manager) (died 1820), English theatre manager
- Thomas Anthony Harris (1910–1995), American psychiatrist
- Thomas Lake Harris (1823–1906), American spiritualist
- Thomas Allen Harris, founder and president of Chimpanzee Productions
- Thomas Maxwell Harris (1903–1983), British botanist
- Thomas Bradley Harris (1826–1866), American businessman and co-founder of the American colony of "Ellena"
- Thomas Spencer Harris (1836–1893), California newspaperman
- Thomas Britton Harris IV (born 1958), chief investment officer of the University of Texas Investment Management Company
- Tomás Harris (1908–1964), UK security service officer during World War II

== See also ==
- Tom Harris (disambiguation)
- Tommy Harris (disambiguation)
