= July 1974 =

Month of 1974

<<	July 1974					>>
Su	Mo	Tu	We	Th	Fr	Sa
	1	2	3	4	5	6
7	8	9	10	11	12	13
14	15	16	17	18	19	20
21	22	23	24	25	26	27
28	29	30	31

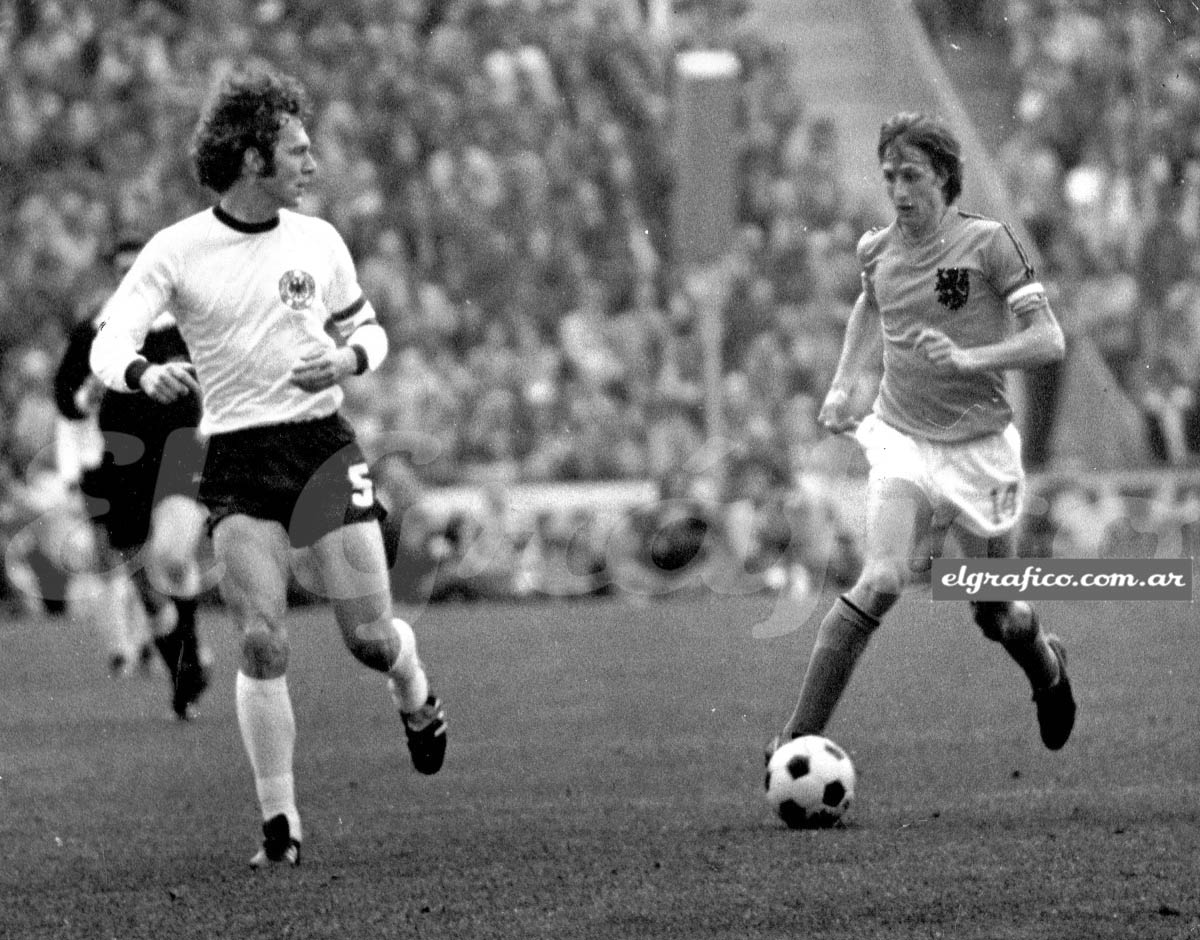
July 7, 1974: West Germany defeats Netherlands, 2 to 1, to win the World Cup (pictured: Franz Beckenbauer and Johann Cruyff)

)

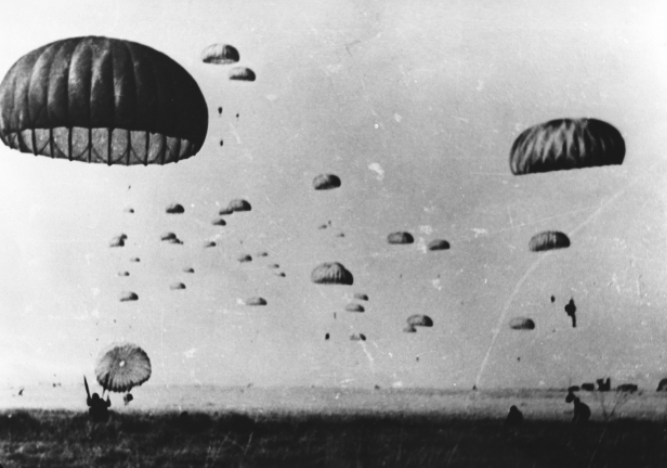
July 20, 1974: Turkey invades Cyprus five days after Greek Cypriot National Guard overthrows the Cyprus President

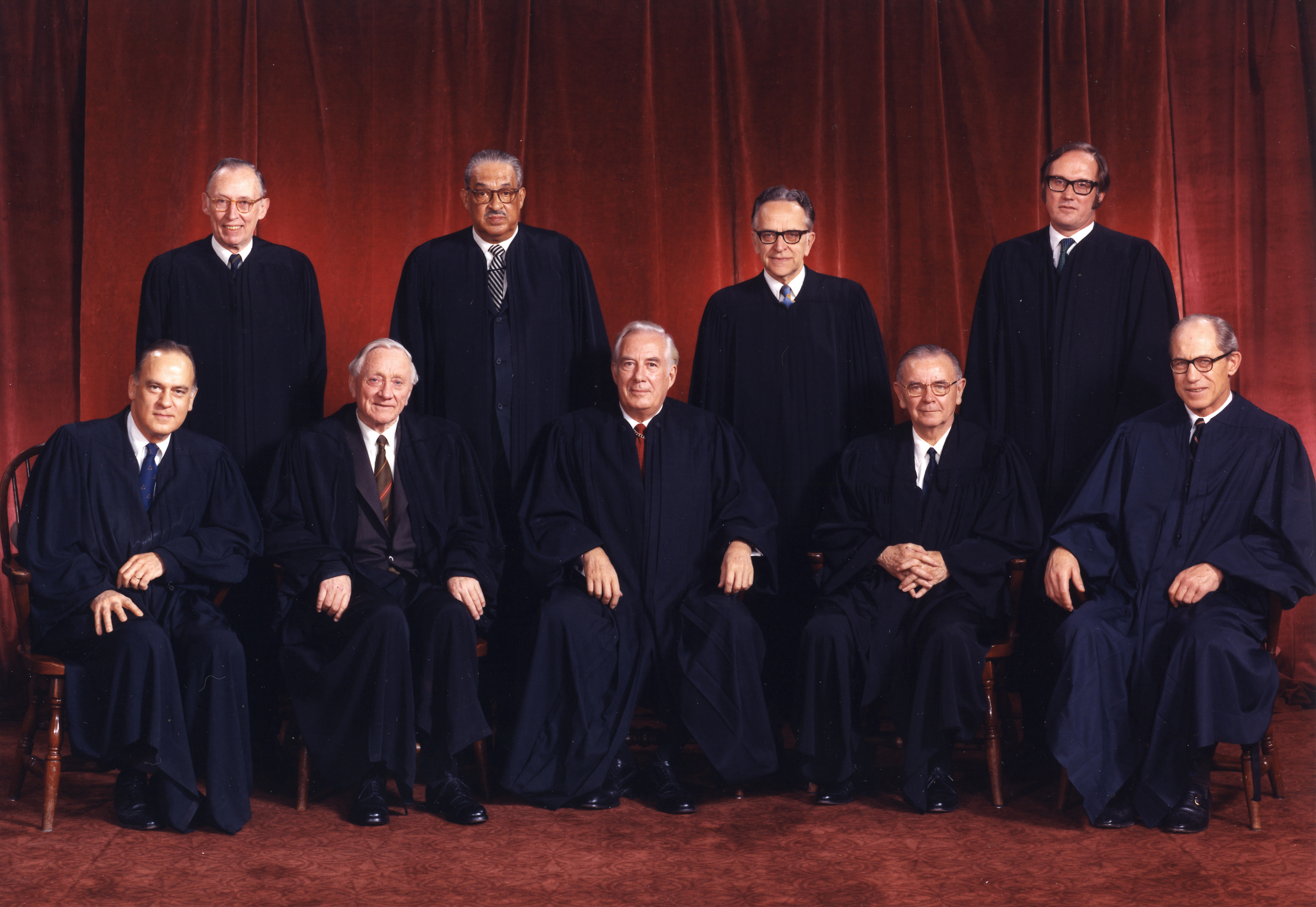
July 24, 1974: U.S. Supreme Court rules unanimously that U.S. President Nixon must comply with subpoena of the Watergate tapes. Rehnquist, top right, recused himself from the decision.

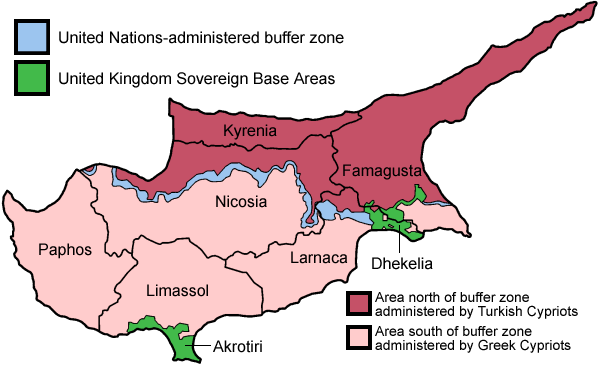
Map of the control of Cyprus by Turkey (red) and Greece (pink)

The following events occurred in July 1974:

== July 1, 1974 (Monday) ==
- On "M-day", road signs in Australia changed from imperial measures in miles to adjusted metric equivalents in kilometers. An advertisement by the Australian Department of Transport told readers "Miles change to kilometres. Make sure YOU understand— it's important, for safety's sake!" and explained "Since a kilometre is 1000 metres in length, or about 5/8 of a mile, all road speed signs in kilometres per hour will be shown in much higher figures than the old miles per hour signs— although the speed you are traveling is about the same."
- Sweden became the first nation in the world to have a national data protection law as the Datalagen (Data Act), passed on May 11, 1973, went into effect.
- Isabel Perón became the first woman to be designated the president of a nation, being sworn in as President of Argentina after the death of her husband, Juan Perón, at the age of 78. Although other women, such as monarchs, had served as heads of state, or heads of government as prime ministers, Mrs. Perón— who had been elected vice president after being the running mate of her husband in the 1973 election— was the first female president.
- The Communist nation of Cuba officially banned the Jehovah's Witnesses, closing houses of worship and providing penalties, including imprisonment for violators.
- Members of the National Football League Players Association (NFLPA) walked out on strike after the deadline passed for the 26 owners of the teams of the National Football League (NFL) declined to meet their demands for an increase in base salary and lifting of restrictions on collective bargaining and reserve clauses in contracts. Most rookie players, who were not immediately eligible to join the NFLPA, would show up to training camps, while most (but not all) veterans declined to pass the picket lines to report for NFL teams.
- The Six Flags Great Adventure amusement park opened to the public in the Philadelphia area, based in Jackson, New Jersey, near Trenton.

== July 2, 1974 (Tuesday) ==
- Ralph Steinhauer, a former chief of the Saddle Lake Cree Nation and agricultural expert, was appointed Lieutenant Governor of Alberta, becoming the first person of Native Canadian origin to be a Lieutenant Governor of a Canadian province.
- American news reporters encountered Soviet censorship while trying to transmit stories from Moscow about dissidence within the U.S.S.R.; the three American networks (ABC, CBS and NBC) had jointly spent $281,000 for transmissions by satellite, and ABC was the first victim as it was sending film of an interview with dissident Soviet nuclear physicist Andrei Sakharov from a Moscow TV studio. The Communist government had warned the U.S. networks to stop sending "anti-Soviet" stories from the Soviet-American summit, with one commenting "Our technicians get insulted."
- The 24th Berlin International Film Festival concluded in Germany, with the Golden Bear being awarded to The Apprenticeship of Duddy Kravit directed by Ted Kotcheff.
- Born:
  - Matthew Reilly, Australian writer of action thrillers, known for his Shane Schofield and Jack West Jr novels; in Sydney
  - Andy McDermott, British writer of action thrillers, known for novels of the team of Nina Wilde and Eddie Chase novels; in Halifax, West Yorkshire
  - Coco Montrese (stage name for Lenwood Cooper), American drag queen and TV star; in Miami

== July 3, 1974 (Wednesday) ==
- The Threshold Test Ban Treaty was signed between the United States and the Soviet Union at the end of Richard Nixon's visit to Moscow.
- Archbishop Makarios III, President of the island republic of Cyprus and a Greek Cypriot in the nation that had large populations of people of Greek and Turkish ancestry, sent an ultimatum to the General Phaedon Gizikis, leader of Greece's ruling military junta, General Phaedon Gizikis, demanding the removal of the 600 Greek officers within the Cypriot National Guard by July 21. Greece's military junta responded by ordering the Greek officers in Cyprus to overthrow Makarios and install a new president who would oversee the annexation of Cyprus to Greece.
- In Thailand, four days of rioting that killed 26 people and injured 120 others, began in the Chinese community in Bangkok after two police arrested a taxi driver for illegal parking on Phlapphla Chai street. On July 7, Prime Minister Sanya Dharmasakti declared a state of emergency, and the Thai Army and local police quelled the riot.
- The Soviet Union successfully launched Soyuz 14 with cosmonauts Yuri Artyukhin and Pavel Popovich, and docked with the Salyut 3 space station. It would return to Earth on July 19. U.S. intelligence concluded that Soyuz 14 had been on a military mission to use make the Salyut 2 station an orbiting reconnaissance platform, because the cosmonauts had sent and received coded messages with ground control on a special channel.
- The third and last scheduled matches in Group A and Group B of the 1974 FIFA World Cup in West Germany proved to be semifinals matching the two unbeaten teams in both groups. The Group A game in Frankfurt featured the Netherlands and Brazil, both with 2-0-0 records against their opponents, while Group B's game in Munich had West Germany and Poland, both 2–0–0. The Netherlands beat defending 1970 champion Brazil, 3 to 0, while home team West Germany eked out a 1 to 0 win over Poland.

== July 4, 1974 (Thursday) ==
- The UK's Northern Ireland Office published a white paper, The Northern Ireland Constitution, proposing elections to a body which would attempt to develop a political settlement for the country.
- The USNS Hughes Glomar Explorer, ostensibly a deep-sea drillship, arrived at the Pacific Ocean northwest of Hawaii to begin an attempt to recover the wreckage of the Soviet submarine K-129, which sank on March 8, 1968. The top secret recovery mission, Project Azorian, was financed by the U.S. Central Intelligence Agency and was able to reach the sub in waters 16,500 feet (5,000 m) deep and recover a portion of the vessel. The project's existence was revealed seven months later.
- Meeting in Gangtok, the 32-member State Council of the Himalayan Kingdom of Sikkim adopted the nation's first constitution to provide for the nation to become a state of India, subject to approval in a referendum. Sikkim's chogyal, King Palden Thondup Namgyal, at one time an absolute monarch, signed the legislation relieving him of all but ceremonial powers. The King appointed Kazi Lhendup Dorji as Prime Minister of a five-member cabinet on July 23. Sikkim would be admitted as the 21st state of India on May 16, 1975.
- Swahili became the official language of Kenya as President Jomo Kenyatta signed legislation providing that all government business, including parliamentary debate, would be conducted in the Bantu language.
- Singers Barry White and Glodean James married.
- Born: Kevin Hanchard, Canadian TV actor known for Hudson & Rex and Orphan Black; in Toronto
- Died:
  - Mohammed Amin al-Husseini, 77, Palestinian and Muslim leader who was the Grand Mufti of Jerusalem in Mandatory Palestine from 1921 to 1937
  - Georgette Heyer, 71, English novelist known for her Regency romances, died of lung cancer.
  - Del Webb, 75, American real estate mogul who created Sun City, Arizona and was co-owner of the New York Yankees, died following surgery for lung cancer.

== July 5, 1974 (Friday) ==
- Construction began in Austria of the 13.976-kilometre (8.684 mi) long Arlberg Road Tunnel (Arlberg Strassentunnel) through the Alps and would last for more than four years. At the time of the tunnel's opening on December 1, 1978, between St Anton am Arlberg in Tyrol and Langen am Arlberg in Vorarlberg, it would be the longest road tunnel in the world.

The Cajun Flag

- The U.S. state of Louisiana authorized a flag for, and recognition of, the "Cajun Country" (officially "Acadiana") in the southern portion of the state, inhabited by Louisiana residents of French descent.
- British commercial diver John Dimmer suffered a fatal pneumothorax during decompression while in saturation aboard the oil platform Sedco 135F in the North Sea.
- Born: Márcio Amoroso, Brazilian footballer, with 19 caps for the national team; in Brasília

== July 6, 1974 (Saturday) ==
- Members of the failed Northern Ireland Executive and Northern Ireland Office (NIO) ministers held talks in Oxford with Harry Murray, chairman of the Ulster Workers' Council (UWC).
- Ten members of the Burmese Air Force were killed while flying in formation in five separate T-33 jets as part of a training mission, when their aircraft crashed into the side of a mountain in the Peguyoma range during heavy rains and strong winds. The five jets were making a 300 miles (480 km) flight between Rangoon and Meiktila when the accident happened.
- The first broadcast was made of the popular American public radio variety show A Prairie Home Companion, created and hosted by Garrison Keillor. The initial show was transmitted live by Minnesota Public Radio from the Janet Wallace Auditorium at Macalester College in St. Paul, Minnesota, before an audience of 12 people.
- Jimmy Connors of the U.S. won the men's singles championship at Wimbledon, defeating Ken Rosewall in straight sets, 6–1, 6–1, 6–4. The win came one day after his fiancée, Chris Evert of the U.S., had won the women's singles title over Olga Morozova of the Soviet Union, 6–0, 6–4. Connors and Evert were scheduled to be married in November 1974, but would break up before the marriage took place.

== July 7, 1974 (Sunday) ==
- West Germany defeated the Netherlands 2–1 to win the World Cup, at Olympiastadion, Munich.
- Voting was held in Japan for 130 of the 252 seats of the House of Councillors (the Sangiin, upper house of Japan's parliament, the National Diet). The Liberal Democratic Party (LDP) of Prime Minister Kakuei Tanaka lost 11 seats, finishing with 126, one delegate shy of the 127 needed for majority control. The LDP, which controlled the lower house, was well ahead of the second-place Japan Socialist Party, led by Tomomi Narita, which finished with 62 seats.
- Sweden's Ronnie Peterson won the 1974 French Grand Prix motor race at Dijon, finishing 20 seconds ahead of Austria's Niki Lauda.
- Born: Ingeborg Arvola, Norwegian novelist and children's book writer; in Honningsvåg
- Died:
  - Joachim Brendel, 53, German Luftwaffe flying ace with 189 victories in aerial combat during World War II
  - Cornelius Vanderbilt IV, 76, U.S. journalist and publisher
  - Nancy Newhall, 66, prolific photography book writer and editor, died of injuries sustained on June 30 while she and other people were on a rafting trip in the Grand Teton National Park in the U.S. state of Wyoming. Mrs. Newhall and 11 other people were in the rubber raft on the Snake River when a giant spruce tree fell onto them.

== July 8, 1974 (Monday) ==
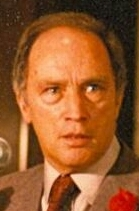
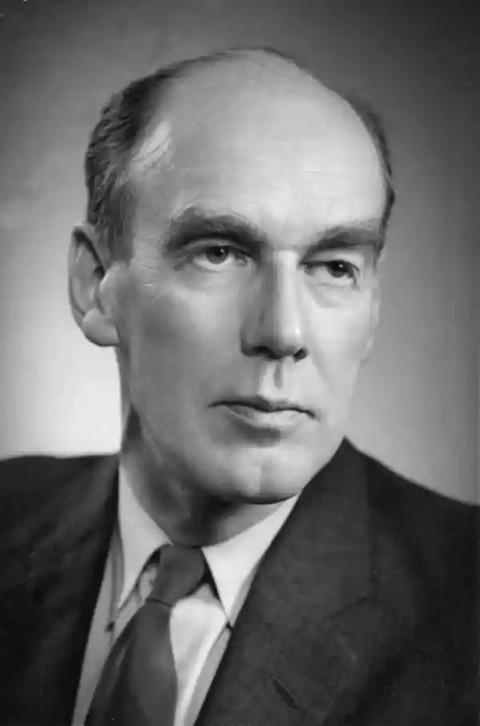
Trudeau and Stanfield
- Voting for all 264 seats of the House of Commons of Canada, where Prime Minister Pierre Trudeau's Liberal Party had a 109 to 107 seat edge over the Progressive Conservative Party led by Robert Stanfield, and neither party had 133 necessary for majority control. The Liberal Party gained 32 seats for 141 overall, while the Progressive Conservatives, the New Democratic Party and the Social Credit Party all lost seats.
- Typhoon Gilda dissipated after 10 days of torrential rains and mudslides that killed 128 people in Korea and Japan.
- The first agreement between India and Sri Lanka, to define their maritime boundaries in the Palk Strait, signed on June 28, came into effect.
- Watergate prosecutor Leon Jaworski and U.S. President Nixon's attorney James D. St. Clair appeared before the U.S. Supreme Court to make oral arguments on the issue of whether Nixon's refusal to release 64 tape recordings, relevant to the Watergate scandal, were protected by executive privilege.
- Deborah Gail Stone, an employee of Disneyland in California, was crushed to death by a rotating wall while working in the new "America Sings" exhibit, becoming the first death of a worker at a Disney park. The ride was immediately closed down and was not reopened until alarms could be installed.
- The body of U.S. diplomat John Patterson, the American vice consul in the Mexican city of Hermosillo, was found in the Sonora desert more than three months after he had been kidnapped on March 22. An American, Bobby Joe Keesee, was arrested on May 28 and confessed to writing a ransom note. Keesee pleaded guilty to conspiracy to kidnap in 1975 and would serve 11 years in prison.
- One week after the beginning of the players' strike against the National Football League, the college students scheduled to play in the July 26 College All-Star Game against the Miami Dolphins voted not to practice unless the NFL strike could be settled. The 1974 game was canceled two days later.

== July 9, 1974 (Tuesday) ==
- The Judiciary Committee of the U.S. House of Representatives released an enhanced version of eight of the White House tapes previously transcribed by Nixon's team. These included potentially damaging statements suppressed in Nixon's version.
- The voting age in France was lowered from 21 to 18, in accordance with legislation that had been approved by the National Assembly on June 25 at the request of President Valéry Giscard d'Estaing. France's Justice Minister Jean Lecanuet said that the law also gave persons 18 to 21, for the first time, the right to choose where they could live, the right to get married without parental permission, the right to open a bank account, get a passport or travel abroad, set up a business, and drink alcohol.
- Four people were killed in Norway while riding the Ulriksbanen aerial tramway near Bergen when a tow rope broke as the carriage was nearing the top of its travel. As the carriage, with eight people aboard, slid back down the carrying rope, it fell from a height of 49 feet (15 m), then tumbled an additional 98 feet (30 m) down a slope before being crushed up against boulders.
- Mexican boxer Rubén Olivares, who had previously been the world bantamweight boxing champion, won the World Boxing Association featherweight title at a bout in Los Angeles, knocking out Zensuke Utagawa of Japan in the 7th round. Both boxers had been fighting for the vacant title left after Ernesto Marcel of Panama had retired earlier in the year.
- Died: Earl Warren, 83, former Chief Justice of the United States from 1953 to 1969

== July 10, 1974 (Wednesday) ==
- The World Football League (WFL), a 12-team challenger to then 26-team National Football League played its first games, with the earliest (at 8:00 pm EST) being the Philadelphia Bell defeating the visiting Portland Storm, 33 to 8, before a crowd alleged to be 55,534 paying customers, and the Florida Blazers beating the Honolulu Hawaiians, 8 to 7 in Orlando. Rich Szaro of Philadelphia scored the first points, kicking a 27-yard field goal.
- The creation of the largest newspaper publisher in the United States, with 35 daily papers and 3.6 million subscribers, was announced with the merger of Knight Newspapers and Ridder Publications to form Knight-Ridder Newspapers Inc. The largest of the Knight papers were the Detroit Free Press, the Philadelphia Inquirer and the Miami Herald while the Ridder papers included the San Jose Mercury and News. The merger put Knight-Ridder ahead of the Tribune Company, owner of the Chicago Tribune, the Daily News of New York, and five other papers for a total circulation of 3.5 million.The company would be acquired by McClatchy in 2006.
- The Bundestag, lower house of West Germany's parliament, voted 262 to 167 to override a veto of the upper house (the Bundesrat) and to ratify a treaty normalizing relations between West Germany and the Communist nation of Czechoslovakia.
- An EgyptAir Tupolev Tu-154 (registration SU-AXO) carrying four Soviet instructors and two EgyptAir pilots on a training flight crashed near Cairo International Airport in Cairo, Egypt, killing all six on board.
- Born: Brian Thompson, American businessman and CEO of the American health insurance company UnitedHealthcare from 2021 until his death, known for being murdered by an attacker in 2024; in Jewell Junction, Iowa (killed, 2024)
- Died: Nancy Wickwire, 48, American daytime television actress known for As the World Turns (1960–1964), Another World (1969–1971) and Days of Our Lives (1972–1973), died of cancer.

== July 11, 1974 (Thursday) ==
- John Kerr, the Lieutenant-Governor of New South Wales, took office as the new Governor-General of Australia, appointed by Queen Elizabeth of Australia after being nominated by Prime Minister Gough Whitlam. n 1975, Kerr would return the favor by firing Whitlam with a power reserved for Australian governors-general.
- Portugal's President Antonio de Spinola dismissed his 15-member cabinet, including Prime Minister Adelino da Palma Carlos who had offered his resignation, along with four other ministers, on July 9.
- Representatives of the Soviet Union and the African nation of Somalia signed a 20-year Treaty of Friendship and Cooperation. The alliance would last for only three years, with Somalia's President Mohammed Siad Barre breaking the agreement in 1977.
- Died: Pär Lagerkvist, 83, Swedish writer and Nobel Prize in Literature laureate

== July 12, 1974 (Friday) ==
- Japan's Deputy Prime Minister Takeo Miki submitted his resignation to Prime Minister Kakuei Tanaka six days after their party, the LDP, had seen its majority in the House of Councillors drop to one seat. Finance Minister Takeo Fukuda followed four days later. Both Miki and Fukuda would later serve as prime ministers of Japan.
- The Congressional Budget Office (CBO), an agency of the U.S. Congress, was created with the signing of the Congressional Budget and Impoundment Control Act of 1974.
- U.S. President Nixon signed the National Research Act into law, creating the Office of Human Research Protections and placing research and experimentation on human beings under federal regulation.
- The small (13,300 people) Republic of San Marino adopted a Declaration of Rights of Sammarinese citizens, as well as setting out constitutional principles. San Marino's two captains regent, Ferruccio Piva and Giordano Bruno Reffi, signed the measure into law after approval by the 80-member Grand and General Council.
- Born:
  - Parvin Dabas, Indian film actor; in Delhi
  - Olivier Adam, French novelist and screenwriter known for Je vais bien, ne t'en fais pas (Don't Worry, I'm Fine) in Draveil, Essonne département
  - Sharon den Adel, Dutch singer; in Waddinxveen

== July 13, 1974 (Saturday) ==
- Colonel Vasco Goncalves was named as the new Prime Minister of Portugal by the nation's president, General Antonio de Spinola, after Spinola fired Premier Adelino da Palma Carlos and his cabinet the day of July 11. General Spinola told reporters that Goncalves had been chosen because he was "better suited than anyone else to carry out the program of the Armed Forces Movement."
- Gary Player of South Africa won the 1974 British Open golf tournament after leading every round of the 72-hole event and being the only player to finish under par in each round. Player finished with 282 strokes, four ahead of Peter Oosterhuis with 286.
- Died:
  - Patrick Blackett, 76, English physicist and 1948 Nobel Prize laureate
  - Hamid Ferej, former president of the Eritrean parliament until the area's annexation by Ethiopia in 1962, and an aide to Lieutenant General Debebe Haile Mariam, the Ethiopian military governor of the Eritrea province was assassinated by members of the Eritrean Liberation Front while he prayed at a mosque in Agordat.

== July 14, 1974 (Sunday) ==
- In the finals of the 1974 FIBA World Championship basketball competition, played in San Juan, Puerto Rico, the Soviet Union won its second title. Rather than a knock-out tournament, the final was a round-robin of 8 teams (Brazil, Canada, Cuba, Puerto Rico, the Soviet Union, Spain, the U.S., and Yugoslavia) playing against each other. Despite that, the decisive game was the Soviet Union's 105 to 94 win over the United States. Since the Soviets, the Americans and the Yugoslavian team each finished with records of 6 wins and one loss, the medals were "decided on the goal average in the three games among each other."
- Born: David Mitchell, British comedian and actor, 2009 BAFTA award winner; in Salisbury, Wiltshire
- Died:
  - Sibyl Hathaway, 90, hereditary ruler of the island of Sark in Britain's Channel Islands since 1927, died after a short illness. Dame Sibyl, described as the leader of "Europe's last feudal fiefdom" by the Associated Press, had absolute authority on an island with "no automobiles, no taxes, no labor unions or strikes and almost no crime." She was succeeded by her grandson, Michael Beaumont.
  - General Carl Spaatz, 83, retired Air Force four-star general and the first Chief of Staff of the U.S. Air Force
  - A. E. Barit, 83, American industrialist who was CEO and president of Hudson Motor Car Company and oversaw its 1954 merger with Nash Motors to create American Motors Corporation
  - Elizabeth Reller, 60, American radio actress best known as the star of (with Don Ameche) of Betty and Bob on the NBC Blue Network (later ABC), as well as CBS and the NBC Red Network

== July 15, 1974 (Monday) ==
- The President of Cyprus, Archbishop Makarios III, was overthrown in a coup d'état carried out by the Cypriot National Guard on orders of General Dimitrios Ioannidis, leader of the military junta ruling Greece. President Makarios, who was able to escape before the destruction of the presidential palace in Nicosia, was replaced by Nikos Sampson, an Enosis activist who supported the annexation of the Greek and Turkish island by Greece. Sampson would be forced to resign eight days later after the Turkish invasion of Cyprus and the collapse of the Greek regime.
- Christine Chubbuck, a 29-year old TV news announcer for WXLT-TV Channel 40 in Sarasota, Florida, became the first person ever to commit suicide on live television, shooting herself after her delivery of the local news on the talk show Suncoast Digest. At 9:38, Ms. Chubbuck, upset over a recent change in the talk show's format to emphasize crime news, told viewers "In keeping with the WXLT practice of presenting the most immediate and complete reports of local blood-and-guts news, TV-40 presents what is believed to be a television first. In living color, an exclusive coverage of an attempted suicide." She then pointed a .38 caliber revolver to her right ear and fired the gun as thousands of viewers watched.
- Born: Denis Berezovsky, former Ukrainian Navy commander who defected to Russia one day after being appointed the Ukrainian Navy's commander-in-chief; in Kharkiv, Ukrainian SSR, Soviet Union
- Died:
  - Arturo Mor Roig, 59, Argentine politician who served as President of Argentina's Chamber of Deputies from 1963 to 1966, and later as Minister of the Interior from 1971 to 1973, was assassinated by Montoneros terrorists. Mor Roig was eating lunch in a restaurant in the Buenos Aires suburb of San Justo when he was shot to death.
  - Erik Charell (pen name for Erich Karl Löwenberg), 80, German theatre and film producer known for Der Kongreß tanzt

== July 16, 1974 (Tuesday) ==
- British troops rescued Archbishop Makarios III, the Greek Cypriot leader who had been overthrown as President of Cyprus, from the coastal city of Paphos and flew him to Malta and then to the UK.
- An avalanche on the north face of Mont Blanc killed eight people, all but two of whom were teenagers ranging from 16 to 18 years old.
- A jury in the U.S. state of Texas recommended that Elmer Wayne Henley, the teenage murderer who had assisted in serial murders carried out in Texas by Dean Corll between 1970 and 1973, be sentenced to six 99-year terms in prison after convicting him in 6 of the 27 murders carried out by Corll. Formal sentencing was set for July 26, with the judge to determine whether the sentences should run concurrently or for 564 consecutive years.
- Born:
  - Stefano Fresi, Italian film and TV actor known for Ma Cosa ci Dice il Cervello; in Rome
  - Espido Freire (pen name for Maria Laura Espido), Spanish novelist; in Bilbao
  - Chris Pontius, American stunt performer and TV personality; in Pasadena, California

== July 17, 1974 (Wednesday) ==
- The bombing of the Tower of London by terrorists of the Provisional Irish Republican Army (IRA) killed one person and injured 41 others. The blast was from a time bomb, planted under a cannon on display, and took place while tourists and sightseers were in the 60-by-30 foot Mortar Room of the Tower. Dorothy Household, a London librarian, died of her injuries after the blast.
- France conducted an atmospheric nuclear bomb test over the Mururoa Atoll test site in the south Pacific, roughly 780 miles (1,260 km) southeast of the French colony at the island of Tahiti. The test, code-named Centaure, had been carried out at 7:04 in the morning local time based on inaccurate weather predictions and the cloud of radioactive fallout passed directly over Tahiti and surrounding islands 42 hours later, on July 19, 1974, exposing as many as 110,000 people with 500 times the maximum exposure to radioactivity.
- The Contraceptive Bill, sponsored by Ireland's National Coalition government, was defeated in a vote in the Dáil Éireann. The Taoiseach (prime minister), Liam Cosgrave, was one of seven Fine Gael members to vote against the bill.
- The Northern Ireland Act 1974 became effective upon receiving royal assent by Queen Elizabeth II of the United Kingdom of Great Britain and Northern Ireland.
- Baseball pitcher Bob Gibson of the St. Louis Cardinals became the first player in National League history, and only the second in Major League Baseball, to strike out 3,000 batters in his career, retiring César Gerónimo of the visiting Cincinnati Reds. Walter Johnson had been the first to reach the 3,000 strikeout mark.
- Born: Jargaltulgyn Erdenebat, Prime Minister of Mongolia 2016 to 2017; in Mandal, Selenge province

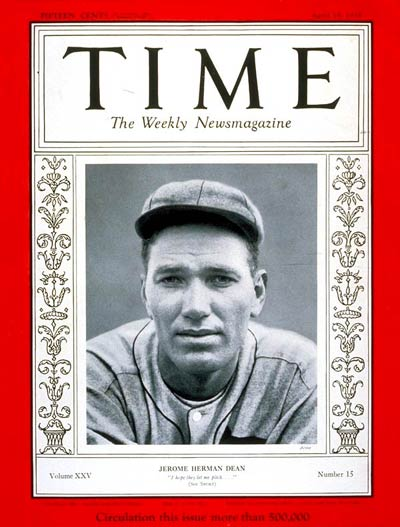
Dean in 1935

- Died:
  - Dizzy Dean (Jay Hanna Dean), 64, U.S. baseball player and inductee in the Baseball Hall of Fame, died of a heart attack.
  - Don Rich (stage name for Donald Eugene Ulrich), 32, American country music guitarist and fiddler for The Buckaroos, was killed in a motorcycle accident at Morro Bay, California while on his way home from a recording session with Buck Owens at Bakersfield.

== July 18, 1974 (Thursday) ==
- In Ireland, a group of women who played the sport of Gaelic football organized the Ladies' Gaelic Football Association (LGFA). Representatives from the counties of Galway, Kerry, Offaly and Tipperary met at the Hayes' Hotel in Thurles, County Tipperary, almost 90 years after the Gaelic Athletic Association(GAA) had been founded in the same hotel. In September, the four teams and teams from another four counties (Cork, Roscommon, Laois, and Waterford) would play the first LFGA Championship tournament. The GAA would accord recognition to the LFGA in 1982.
- In Hanoi, capital of North Vietnam, General Võ Nguyên Giáp of the People's Army of Vietnam gave the go-ahead to General Hoang Van Thai for preparation for the conquest of South Vietnam, starting with a preparatory mission on December 13, 1974 and a larger general offensive to complete the reunification of Vietnam, under Communist rule, by the end of 1976. South Vietnam would be conquered less than five months after the start of the invasion, with Saigon falling on April 30, 1975.
- Commercial diver Fred Brening failed to surface from a dive into a flooded dry dock pump well at the Brooklyn Navy Yard. Brening, who had only an hour's supply of oxygen, was found dead the following day in a maze of pipes on the second level of the well.

== July 19, 1974 (Friday) ==
- Seven people were killed and 349 others injured in the U.S. by the explosion of a railroad tanker car containing isobutane, following its collision with a boxcar in the Norfolk & Western railroad yard at Decatur, Illinois.
- Hospitalized for phlebitis, Spain's dictator Francisco Franco signed a decree appointing Prince Juan Carlos de Borbon y Borbon as the acting chief of state.
- American mobster Sam Giancana was arrested in Mexico after fleeing the U.S. to Cuernavaca to avoid testifying before a grand jury. He was deported from Mexico on July 21 and flown to Chicago, where he continued to live until his murder in 1975.
- Born: Timur Artemev, Russian mobile phone entrepreneur who founded Euroset; in Moscow, Soviet Union
- Died:
  - Joe Flynn, 49, American TV and film actor best known for the comedy McHale's Navy, died of a heart attack while swimming at his home.
  - Stefano Magaddino, 82, Italian-born American crime boss who controlled the underworld in Buffalo, New York, died of natural causes.

== July 20, 1974 (Saturday) ==
- Five days after Greek Cypriot activists overthrew the government of Cyprus, armed forces from Turkey carried out a massive invasion and occupation by land, sea and air of the northern portion of the island republic, which was primarily occupied by Turkish Cypriots. After departing from the Turkish port of Mersin the night before, four battalions of 3,500 Turkish soldiers began coming ashore at Glykiotissa, near the northern port of Kyrenia at 7:15 local time, and engaged in battle against the Greek-commanded Cypriot National Guard. At the same time, Turkish warplanes bombed the airport at the capital, Nicosia, and both a Cypriot National Guard camp and a Greek Army contingent near Nicosia. Turkish Prime Minister Bulent Ecevit said that the decision to invade was made at an emergency meeting of his cabinet before dawn.
- Hours after the Turkish invasion of Cyprus, members of the Greek Cypriot National Guard entered the predominantly Turkish village of Alaminos and murdered 15 men between the ages of 25 and 50. According to a correspondent with the American TV network NBC, the national guardsmen were reportedly upset that their commander had been killed in a fight with Turkish invaders.
- Death sentences for five South Korean dissidents, issued by a military court-martial, were commuted to life imprisonment by Defense Minister Suh Jong Chul. The group— poet Kim Chi Ha, Yoo In Tai, Kim Byung Kar, and Rah Byung Shikr— were leaders of demonstrators and had been convicted on charges of attempting to overthrow the government.
- A group of women calling themselves the "Dublin City Women's Invasion Force", including Nell McCafferty and Nuala Fennell, intruded on the Forty Foot bathing place in Sandycove, traditionally a men-only nude bathing area, to claim the right to swim there.
- On the fifth anniversary of the Apollo 11 landing on the Moon, Neil Armstrong, Buzz Aldrin and Michael Collins spoke at a press conference, where Armstrong confirmed a statement by Collins that Armstrong had exercised his right as mission commander to be the first person to walk on the Moon, despite early flight plans that gave the assignment to Aldrin. Armstrong said that since he was closest to the hatch, he left the lunar module first even though the practice was for the module pilot to leave first, allowing Aldrin to go first "required that the two crewmen change places in pressurized suits in a cramped area. It was not impossible, but it was very difficult and possibly dangerous." Collins had written in his book, Carrying the Fire: An Astronaut's Journeys, that Aldrin and Armstrong had argued about the decision prior to the mission launch, and said "I did not mean to imply in my book that there was anything abnormal about the reversal. It was a normal thing and made the best sense." Aldrin told reporters "I do what my boss tells me to."
- The first rock concert to be held at Knebworth House in Hertfordshire, UK, featured The Allman Brothers Band, Van Morrison, Tim Buckley and others, and was attended by an estimated 60,000 people.
- Born: Yury Slyusar, Russian businessman and CEO of United Aircraft Corporation (UAC); in Rostov-on-Don, Russian SFSR, Soviet Union
- Died: Alexander Kartveli, 77, Georgian-Russian born U.S. aeronautical engineer for Republic Aviation and pioneer in turbojet military fighters

== July 21, 1974 (Sunday) ==
- Turkish Air Force fighter planes mistakenly attacked and sank the Turkish Navy destroyer TCG Kocatepe, killing 54 people, and heavily damaged the ships Adatepe and Mareşal Fevzi Çakmak off the coast of Paphos at Cyprus.
- Eddy Merckx won the 1974 Tour de France.
- Israel's cabinet voted, by a large majority, to reject a proposal to begin discussions with moderate Palestinian representatives to establish an independent Palestinian nation on the West Bank in exchange for Arab recognition of Israel's right to exist.
- Egypt signed agreements granting exclusive rights to prospect for oil and gas to, in an around the Gulf of Suez, to Standard Oil Company of Indiana (Amoco), and for rights in and around the Red Sea to Mobil Oil Corporation and Union Oil Company of California, in return for the companies to pay 20% of any revenues made from the discoveries."The World". Los Angeles Times. July 22, 1974. p. I-2.
- Amparo Muñoz of Spain was crowned as Miss Universe 1974 at the pageant in Manila. Muñoz, one of 65 competitors from around the world, would voluntarily relinquish her title six months later after declining to travel to Japan as part of her worldwide visiting requirements, and no successor would be named.

== July 22, 1974 (Monday) ==
- Operation Niki, an attempt by Greece's Hellenic Air Force to support the Greek Cypriot National Guard in defending against the Turkish invasion of Cyprus, failed when the guardsmen mistook the Greek air support for enemy invaders. The "friendly fire" by members of the national guard, which had not been informed that the Greek commandos were coming to their rescue, shot down a Nord Noratlas transport aircraft as it was about to land, killing 27 Greek commandos and the four-member crew.
- Endelkachew Makonnen, Prime Minister of Ethiopia, was removed from office, and replaced by Lij Mikael Imru. Makonnen was arrested the next day on orders of the ruling Derg.
- Otto Kerner Jr. resigned as a U.S. federal judge with the Seventh Circuit Court of Appeals before the U.S. House of Representatives was to hold hearings on whether to impeach him. Kerner, former Governor of Illinois, prominent as Chairman of the Kerner Commission on the investigation of race rioting and a judge since 1968, had lost his appeal on a conviction of mail fraud, conspiracy and perjury. On July 29, seven days after his conviction, Kerner began serving a three-year federal prison sentence after stepping down from the bench.
- Died:
  - Wayne Morse, 73, U.S. Senator for Oregon from 1945 to 1969, known for being one of two Senators to vote against the 1964 Gulf of Tonkin Resolution that approved the U.S. President's commitment of military combat in Vietnam without a declaration of war, died after becoming ill during a campaign to regain his seat in the 1974 U.S. Senate elections.
  - Edna Lewis Thomas, 88, African-American stage actress on Broadway from 1923 to 1958

== July 23, 1974 (Tuesday) ==
- Greek President Phaedon Gizikis called a meeting to attempt to appoint a national unity government with the goal of peacefully preventing a war in Cyprus between Greece and Turkey. Former Prime Minister Konstantinos Karamanlis returned from exile to Athens on a Mystère 20 jet, made available to him by French President Valéry Giscard d'Estaing.
- Glafcos Clerides, Speaker of the Cyprus House of Representatives, took office as President of Cyprus after coup leader Nikos Sampson stepped down in the wake of Turkey's invasion of the island republic.
- British Airways Flight 6356, flying to London after taking off from Belfast with 92 people, made an emergency landing in Manchester after an Irish newspaper and a news agency were tipped off by an anonymous caller that a gelignite time bomb had been placed on the aircraft. A two-pound bomb was found in a paper bag under a seat on the Trident jet, apparently after being placed there by a passenger who had flown to Belfast and left before the plane departed again for London. The plane was carrying a crew of seven and 85 passengers, including James Flanagan, police chief of the Royal Ulster Constabulary.
- Born: Maurice Greene, U.S. Olympic sprinter, gold medalist in the 100m dash in 2000, winner of gold medals in three world track and field championships in 1997, 1999 and 2001; in Kansas City, Kansas
- Died: Soekiman Wirjosandjojo, 76, Prime Minister of Indonesia 1951 to 1952

== July 24, 1974 (Wednesday) ==
- The U.S. Supreme Court issued a landmark decision in United States v. Nixon, holding unanimously (8 to 0) that the President of the United States could not withhold evidence based on the defense of national security, and ordering U.S. President Nixon to release the tape recordings, pertaining to the Watergate scandal, made of conversations in the Oval Office of the White House. Associate Justice William Rehnquist recused himself from the decision because he had worked for the U.S. Attorney General in the past and had been appointed to his position by Nixon. The decision would clear the way for the release of the incriminating tape of June 23, 1972, in which Nixon authorized obstruction of justice.
- The Greek military junta, headed by General Dimitrios Ioannidis, stepped down as former Premier Konstantinos Karamanlis was sworn in as Prime Minister. Karmanalis took office at 4:00 in the morning after returning to Athens from Paris, where he had been living since 1967. General Phaedon Gizikis continued as the figurehead President of Greece. Amnesty was granted by the Karmanalis government to all political prisoners who had been incarcerated during the rule of the junta. The first detainees were returned to mainland the next day from the prison island of Gyaros
- The Huntsville Prison siege began in Huntsville, Texas, United States, when Fred Gómez Carrasco, serving a life sentence for the attempted murder of a police officer, and two other inmates laid siege to the education building of the Walls Unit.
- In Colombia, a 29-year-old man hijacked an Avianca Boeing 727, with 129 passengers on board, shortly after it took off from Pereira, for a domestic flight to Medellín, and demanded a ransom of two million U.S. dollars and the release of a political prisoner. The airliner diverted to Cali, where police disguised as flight mechanics boarded and overcame the hijacker and a female companion. The suspect, Eduardo Martinez, had hijacked a Colombian plane in 1969 and flown it to Cuba, then made it back to Colombia to commit a second air piracy. The hijacker was shot when he threatened an armed police officer who had boarded the aircraft. He died of his injuries hours later at the hospital.
- The record for fewest votes cast in the British House of Commons was set on a motion to adjourn debate on the British Railways Bill. At 1:33 in the morning, with few MPs present, Conservative member Bernard Braine cast the lone vote, opposing the motion. The motion was declared not decided because of the lack of a quorum.
- Born:
  - Atsuhiro Miura, Japanese footballer with 25 caps for the Japan national team; in Ōita, Ōita Prefecture
  - Eugene Mirman, Russian-born American comedian and voice actor, as Evgeny Borisovich Mirman in Moscow
  - Veronica Vasquez, American singer; in the Bronx, New York
- Died:
  - James Chadwick, 82, English physicist and 1935 Nobel Prize laureate for his discovery of the neutron
  - Ernest Milton, 84, American-born British Shakespearean actor

== July 25, 1974 (Thursday) ==
- The United Nations Buffer Zone in Cyprus was established by agreement of the foreign ministers of Greece George Mavros, Turkey (Turan Güneş) and the United Kingdom (Foreign Secretary James Callaghan) at a meeting in Geneva, setting a neutral zone separating the Greek Cypriot population in southern Cyprus from the Turkish Cypriot population in northern Cyprus. The zones are divided by a 112-mile (180 km) line that runs west to east from Kato Pyrgos to Paralimni and passes through the capital of Cyprus, Nicosia. The "Green Line" effectively divides the Republic of Cyprus and the largely unrecognized Turkish Republic of Northern Cyprus.
- The U.S. Supreme Court ruled, 5 to 4, that busing of students from suburban school districts to city schools, to achieve racial desegregation, was unconstitutional. The decision came in a challenge to a ruling requiring white students in Michigan, living outside Detroit city and school district limits, to be sent on school buses to predominantly black schools in Detroit.
- The World Court of the United Nations ruled against Iceland in favor of the UK and West Germany in a suit arisung from the "Cod Wars" over fishing in the North Atlantic Ocean. The International Court of Justice held that Iceland was not entitled to extend its fishing limit from 12 miles (19 km) to 50 miles (80 km).
- The Legal Services Corporation (LSC) was created in the U.S. as President Nixon signed legislation passed by Congress to fund legal aid for the poor, for limited purposes. In return for funding, representation was limited to civil cases involving rent, child custody, property, housing and welfare rights, and were barred from being paid for cases involving constitutional law, such as for the military draft, racial desegregation, labor disputes and abortion.
- In Green Bay, Wisconsin, 21 NFLPA union members were arrested during the union's labor strike against the National Football League, after refusing orders to comply with a restraining order. The rounded up members of the Green Bay Packers and Chicago Bears posted bond during their arraignment and were released. Players arrested including Rich McGeorge and Gale Gillingham of Green Bay, and Mac Percival of Chicago. The remaining packers went on to beat Chicago, 17 to 0, in a preseason game.

== July 26, 1974 (Friday) ==
- In the Soviet Union, the 1,517 delegates of the Presidium of the Supreme Soviet voted unanimously to re-elect Nikolai V. Podgorny as the official head of state (the Chairman of the Presidium), and Alexei Kosygin as Chairman of the Council of Ministers, equivalent to Prime Minister. Podgorny and Kosygin had been nominated by Communist Party First Secretary Leonid Brezhnev, de facto leader of the Communist nation as well as a voting member of the lower house of the Supreme Soviet, the 767-member Soviet of the Union.
- Serial killer Paul John Knowles picked the lock of a jail cell in Jacksonville, Florida, where he was being held for assault, broke into a house, and strangled a 65-year-old woman, the first of 18 murders he would commit over the next four months. Three murders followed in August, five in September, three in October and six more in November. The day after shooting a Florida state trooper and a motorist, Knowles would be caught on November 17, 1974, by a civilian in Georgia. Knowles himself would be shot to death on December 18 after attempting to disarm a sheriff.
- U.S. Representative Paul Sarbanes of Maryland, a member of the House Judiciary Committee, introduced the first proposed article of impeachment against U.S. President Richard Nixon on charges of the crime of obstruction of justice.
- A teenage girl discovered the body of an unidentified woman at Race Point Dunes, Provincetown, Massachusetts. The identity of "The Lady of the Dunes" would remain unsolved for almost 48 years until 2022, when genetic testing confirmed that she was Ruth Marie Terry (1936–1974), who had been murdered by her husband.
- Died:
  - George Barr, 82, American Major League Baseball umpire
  - Floyd H. Nolta, 74, American airplane pilot and inventor who developed (in 1955) the first successful method of dropping water from an airplane for fighting forest fires
  - Arthur K. Watson, 55, President of IBM World Trade Corporation and former U.S. Ambassador to France, died eight days after being fatally injured from a fall at his home in Connecticut.

== July 27, 1974 (Saturday) ==
- The U.S. House Judiciary Committee voted, 27 to 11, to approve the proposed Article One for the impeachment of U.S. President Nixon, a resolution alleging that "Richard M. Nixon, using the powers of his high office, engaged personally and through his subordinates and agents, in a course of conduct or plan designed to delay, impede, and obstruct the investigation" of the Watergate scandal as well "to cover up, conceal and protect those responsible; and to conceal the existence and scope of other unlawful covert activities." Six Republicans joined all 21 Democrats on the Committee in voting in favor of the article. White House Press Secretary Ronald Ziegler told reporters, "The President remains confident that the House will recognize that there simply is not the evidence to support this or any other article of impeachment. He is confident because he knows he has committed no impeachable offense."
- The Rhodesian Army began Operation Overload, the forcible relocation of 49,690 black African civilians within the Chiweshe Tribal Trust Land to 21 "protected villages" away from guerrillas of the Zimbabwe African National Liberation Army (ZANLA). By August 15, the relocation was completed but the protected villages proved to be inadequately protected and lacked sanitation facilities.
- Portugal's President, General António de Spínola, announced that his government would grant unconditional independence to the European nation's African colonies in Angola, Cape Verde, Mozambique, São Tomé and Príncipe and Portuguese Guinea (later Guinea-Bissau. Spinola had signed a notice on July 25 that stated, "The principle that a solution to the overseas wars is political, and not military, implies the recognition by Portugal of the right to self-determination by the people."
- Edward LeBlanc, who had led the British West Indies colony of Dominica for 13 years as Chief Minister and then as Premier, resigned suddenly and without explanation, four years before Dominica would become an independent nation. Patrick John became the new premier the next day, and would become the first Prime Minister of Dominica on November 3, 1978.
- Edwin Reinecke, Lieutenant Governor of the U.S. state of California was convicted of perjury by a federal court jury. On October 2, he would resign after receiving a suspended sentence of 18 months imprisonment.
- The British & Irish Lions rugby union completed their 12-week tour of South Africa, playing to a 13–13 draw against the Springboks of South Africa after 21 consecutive wins.
- Born: Eason Chan (Chan Yick Shun), Hong Kong Cantopop music singer and actor; in British Hong Kong
- Died: Lightnin' Slim (stage name for Otis Hicks), 61, U.S. blues musician, died of stomach cancer.

== July 28, 1974 (Sunday) ==
- The sinking of the South Korean ship Western Star, after its collision with the Japanese freighter Kikuko Maru, killed 24 of the 26 people on board.
- Born: Alexis Tsipras, Greek politician, Prime Minister of Greece from 2015 to 2019; in Athens
- Died:
  - Konstantin Chkheidze, 76, Czech–Georgian–Russian writer, committed suicide.
  - Don McCafferty, 53, head coach of the Detroit Lions and former head coach of the Baltimore Colts, died of a heart attack at his home shortly after the opening of training camp in preparation for the 1974 NFL season.

== July 29, 1974 (Monday) ==
- In the U.S., the "Philadelphia Eleven", all deacons in their own churches became the first women to be ordained as priests in the Episcopal Church. Three men who were Episcopal bishops conducted an unauthorized ceremony at the Church of the Advocate in Philadelphia. Among the 11 were Alison Cheek, future federal judge Emily C. Hewitt, Isabel Carter Heyward, balloon pilot Jeannette Piccard, and Betty Bone Schiess. They were ordained by Robert L. DeWitt, Bishop of Pennsylvania; Daniel Corrigan, Suffragan Bishop of Colorado; and Edward R. Welles II, the retired Bishop of West Missouri.
- Yuri Andropov, Director of the KGB, the Soviet Union's espionage and internal security agency, issued order number 0089/OV, establishing the Alpha Group, a sub-unit of the KGB's Special Forces.
- Peru's President Juan Velasco Alvarado, announced Plan Inca, the ruling military junta's program for modernizing the South American nation.
- An eruption of the Japanese volcano Niigata-Yakeyama killed three students who were climbing the mountain at the time.
- Born:
  - Josh Radnor, American TV actor best known for portraying "Ted Mosby" on the long-running show How I Met Your Mother; in Columbus, Ohio
  - Afroman (stage name for Joseph Foreman), American hip hop artist and comedian, Grammy Award nominee; in Los Angeles
- Died:
  - Cass Elliot (stage name for Ellen Naomi Cohen), 32, U.S. singer for The Mamas & the Papas, known as "Mama Cass", died of a heart attack linked to obesity. The death was originally attributed, incorrectly, to choking on food.
  - Erich Kästner, 72, German poet and children's book author known for Emil and the Detectives
  - W. J. Seeley, 79, former dean of Duke University Pratt School of Engineering

== July 30, 1974 (Tuesday) ==
- The Foreign Ministers of Greece, Turkey and the United Kingdom signed a peace agreement in Geneva, after mediation by U.S. Secretary of State Henry Kissinger, providing for the immediate end of fighting on the island of Cyprus.
- Segregated voting was held in Rhodesia for the 66-member House of Assembly, with white voters picking candidates for the 50 seats reserved for the white minority, and black and mixed race voters selecting from 26 candidates for the 16 "tribal seats" reserved for the non-white candidates. The Rhodesian Front party won all 50 of the contests for the white seats although candidates from the Rhodesia Party were on the ballot. At the time, 300,000 residents of Rhodesia were white, while 5,700,000 were black or mixed race. Despite being only 5% of the population, the whites had 76% of the seats in parliament.
- The U.S. House Judiciary Committee adjourned its proceedings for impeachment after passing three articles of impeachment in three days. A proposed Article IV, regarding illegal use of power in the 1970 invasion of Cambodia, was rejected, with 12 votes for and 26 against. Debate in the full House on whether to impeach was scheduled for August 19, but Nixon's resignation on August 9 made the point moot.
- The 1974 Scheldeprijs cycle race was held in Belgium and the Netherlands, and was won by Marc Demeyer.
- Born:
  - Hilary Swank, U.S. film actress, winner of two Academy Awards for Best Actress for Boys Don't Cry (1999) and Million Dollar Baby (2005); in Lincoln, Nebraska
  - Jacek Dukaj, Polish science fiction writerknown for Starość aksolotla (The Old Axolotl); in Tarnów
  - Nami Otake, Japanese women's national football team soccer footballer, with 46 caps; in Machida, Tokyo
- Died: Elizabeth Gould Davis, 64, American librarian, author of The First Sex, suicide by firearm

== July 31, 1974 (Wednesday) ==
- In Canada, the Official Language Act (Quebec) (also known as "Bill 22") was passed, making French the official language of government and business in the province of Quebec.
- The Dewan Rakyat, national parliament of Malaysia, was dissolved by order of the Asian nation's elected monarch, the Yang di-Pertuan Agong, Abdul Halim of Kedah, and elections were scheduled for August 24.
- The Consumer Credit Act 1974 was given royal assent and became law in the United Kingdom
- Born: Emilia Fox, English actress, to Joanna David and Edward Fox; in Hammersmith, London
- Died: Raymond Aloysius Lane, M.M., 80, American Roman Catholic missionary
