= Santa Ana Standard =

Newspaper in California, U.S.

The Santa Ana Standard, commonly referred to as simply The Standard, was a newspaper published in Santa Ana, California. Founded by Colonel Thomas Harris in 1882, it was a controversial newspaper in the 1880s through the early 20th century, and was once referred to as the "Graveyard of Newspapers". Led by the "opinionated and flamboyant" publisher D.M. ("Fighting Dan") Baker, it often published sensationalist articles, mocking local figures and condemning and passing judgement on wrong-doers, with headlines which were considered particularly harsh for the times. One headline read "Awful, brutal butchery! Cruel, Cowardly! of a Devilish, Damnable Person! Mrs. O.R. Scholl of Tustin Cuts Her Children's Throat." Reporting on the death of Modesta Avila in prison in September 1891, The Standard wrote an unsympathetic obituary, stating that she was "a well-known favorite of the Santa Ana boys", concluding with, "Let those who are without sin throw the first stone".
