= Tom Harris =

Tom Harris may refer to:

- Tom Harris (announcer) (born 1962), American announcer and sportscaster
- Tom Harris (Australian politician) (born 1940), Northern Territory MLA
- Tom Harris (botanist) (1903–1983), British palaeobotanist and academic at the University of Reading
- Tom Harris (British politician) (born 1964), Scottish former MP
- Tom Harris (film producer), producer of The Cross and the Switchblade
- Tom Harris (footballer) (1905–1985), English footballer
- Tom Harris (football manager), manager of Notts County F.C. between 1893 and 1913
- Tom Harris (mechanical engineer) (born 1953), Canadian lobbyist
- Tom Harris (rugby union), English international rugby union player
- Tom Harris, bass player for Detroit rock band Frijid Pink
- An alias of Whitey Bulger (1929–2018)

== See also ==
- Thomas Harris (disambiguation)
- Tommy Harris (disambiguation)
