= Tommy Harris =

Tommy Harris or Tommie Harris may refer to:

- Tommy Harris (baseball) (1923–1991), American Negro leagues baseball player
- Tommy Harris (rugby) (1927–2006), Welsh rugby league footballer, coach and administrator
- Tommy Harris (Coronation Street), a character from the British soap opera Coronation Street
- Tommy Harris (footballer) (1924–2001), English footballer
- Tomás Harris (1908–1964), British MI5 agent
- Tommie Harris (born 1983), American football defensive tackle

== See also ==
- Thomas Harris (disambiguation)
- Tom Harris (disambiguation)
