= Lu Wheat Smith =

American artist and writer (c.1840–1909)

Lu Wheat Smith (c. 1840 – 1909) was an American artist and writer active in California in the late 19th and early 20th centuries. She was also notable for a California Supreme Court decision concerning her divorce and for her publicized efforts to gain custody of her daughter, Ethel Gray Smith.

== Biography ==
Lu Wheat was born around 1840 in Michigan and was a nurse in the U.S. Civil War. She married a Los Angeles lawyer, Thomas H. Smith, a man 17 years older than she, who by 1882 had become a judge, and they had four children—Emma Wheat Smith, Frank Wheat Smith, Lulu Wheat Smith and Ethel Gray Smith. She described herself as an agnostic.

She became an artist, and in 1880, at the age of 40, she went to Düsseldorf, Germany, for advanced art studies. After her return, her husband successfully sued for divorce on the ground of cruelty. Lu Smith appealed to the California Supreme Court, which set aside the divorce in Thomas H. Smith v. Lu Wheat Smith (December 28, 1882), stating that "The only fact of alleged cruelty expressly found [by the trial court] is that the defendant deserted her husband and children and went to Germany for the purpose of perfecting herself in the art of painting and was abroad about three months. This act did not of itself constitute such cruelty as entitled the plaintiff to a divorce."

Thomas Smith later moved from Los Angeles to Oakland, California, taking daughter Ethel Gray Smith with him, where he placed the girl in a Catholic boarding school. Lu Smith remained behind, on a ranch in Norwalk. Later, after the death of Thomas Smith in 1890, his ex-wife engaged in a series of well-publicized court battles in Alameda County, attempting to gain custody of the child, which was granted but later rescinded.

In Los Angeles, Lu Smith was known as an "authoress and club woman" whose "greatest literary achievement" might have been The Third Daughter, "a novel depicting the life of the higher class of the Chinese and showing the position of women in China". She died on August 7, 1909.

== See also ==
- George Hayford, attorney who was challenged by Lu Smith for custody of her daughter
