= George Hayford =

American lawyer (1858–??)

George Hayford (born September 8, 1858–?) was a 19th- and early 20th-century lawyer who was noted as a forger and who served time in both Oregon and California for obtaining money under false pretenses. As a con man, he claimed to be attorney general of Oregon and to have been working under cover to investigate conditions at the Oregon State Penitentiary in Salem.

He was also the topic of gossip detailing his relationship with a teenage girl whom he took under his care.

Hayford was the subject of a manhunt when he leaped from a moving train during one of his arrests.

== Personal ==
George Hayford was born to Riley Hayford, a Great Lakes ship captain, and Eliza Jane Turner, on September 8, 1858. In 1865 they were living in Buffalo, New York.

In 1877, Hayford was married to Tillie McCarthy in Iowa. Their children were Mattie Belle, born 1878; Grace, born 1883, and Juanita, born 1890.

In 1880, the Hayfords were living in Hopkins, Missouri, where Hayford was working as a telegraph operator. By 1889 they had moved to Orange County, California, and George Hayford worked for Postal Telegraph.

Hayford was arrested on a charge of wife beating in 1889, and he unsuccessfully sued a local newspaper for libel in writing an article about it.

In 1892, Hayford was attempting to board a train with his family from Orange County, California, where the Hayfords had been living, to a new home in Los Angeles, when he was set upon at the Santa Ana station by a woman who insisted that he owed her money for purchases at her bakery. Attempting to dodge her pursuit, Hayford made a jump for the rear platform of the train, but missed, and the train went on without him. He later took another train from a station farther down the line. He later returned to Santa Ana, and was confronted by the same woman. Both incidents were widely reported in California newspapers.

In June 1893, Hayford was arrested for striking his wife with a cane, convicted of battery and fined. In that year he moved to San Francisco, where he began a new law practice.

George Hayford successfully sued Tillie Hayford for divorce in September 1895.

He later had a wife who was identified in the newspapers only as "a Russian."

== Legal problems ==
=== Modesta Avila ===
Hayford, who had been studying law on his own, was admitted at age 31 to practice that profession in 1889, and one of his first cases was that of Modesta Avila, a woman who was accused of placing a clothes line across the Santa Fe Railroad tracks in front of her San Juan Capistrano home. He worked pro bono, or for free, and made unsuccessful appeals to the California Supreme Court on her behalf. She died while serving her short sentence.

=== Contempt of court ===
Hayford went to investigate the situation on the property of a client in 1891 and was threatened with a pistol by another attorney. Both were arrested, and Hayford was found guilty of contempt of court.

=== Bentley murder case ===
On January 1, 1893, wealthy property owner Gregoria Bentley died, and traces of strychnine were found in her body. Her husband, Henry Bentley, was arrested and charged with murder, and he retained Hayford as his attorney. On April 27, 1893, Bentley was found guilty, but the verdict was overturned by the judge on the ground that the jury did not adequately consider all the evidence.

=== Ethel Gray Smith ===
In the summer of 1892, Hayford was working as a lawyer for artist Lu Wheat Smith when he was introduced to Smith's 15-year-old daughter, Ethel, on their farm in Norwalk, California. In August, Ethel fell ill and was nursed by Tillie Hayford in the Hayford home in Los Angeles.

Later Ethel moved back to Oakland, California, where she had previously lived with her father, Thomas Smith, a well-known lawyer and former judge who died in 1890. At this point, Ethel was being cared for in a Catholic orphanage, and Thomas Smith's estate and Ethel herself were under the control of two guardians.

In August 1892, Hayford, stating that he represented both Lu Wheat and Ethel Smith, began his attempts to get an accounting from one of the guardians concerning Ethel's share of the estate. In that year, he took the girl from Oakland and put her with a family in a San Francisco flat, and she began studying in a business college, with the idea of becoming Hayford's secretary. After some delay a report accounted for every dollar in the estate. In the meantime, suspicions were raised publicly as to the relationship between Hayford and Ethel Smith.

In February 1894, Hayford wrote a letter to one of his daughters in Los Angeles which was interpreted to mean that he would take a trip to Europe when he got control of Ethel's money. A judge thereupon removed the girl from any control by Hayford, and she went to Denver, Colorado, to live with a sister.

=== Arrest and conviction ===
In 1896, Hayford was charged with embezzling from a woman he represented as a lawyer, but he was acquitted, the judge stating that the matter was one that should be handled as a civil, not criminal, trial. The next year, 1897, he was accused of embezzling from a client who sought to sue her sailor husband for separate maintenance. In 1898 he was arrested for cashing bad checks in San Francisco.

In 1898 Hayford left California and traveled through Oregon to Minnesota, where he was arrested in St. Paul on a charge of passing bad checks and brought back to Oregon, where he pled guilty and served less than a year. After his release from the Oregon prison, he told the Salem Daily Journal that on his way while under arrest from Minnesota to Oregon he had jumped from the train in an effort to escape but he was rearrested when his tracks were followed through the snow.

=== False claims and lectures ===
Hayford then began lecturing across the northern part of the country, as far east as Philadelphia, claiming that he was a former Attorney General of Oregon, and then a judge and "one of the best-known authorities on criminal law in the United States." He said he had sent himself to prison "so he could study the penal system of the state" and the "cruelties" practiced on the inmates. He claimed that his secret identity was known to only a few of the prison officials.

=== Other arrests ===
Hayford traveled through Washington, D.C., where he assertedly cashed more bad checks. He was arrested in his flat in Harlem, New York City, and brought back to Washington, but he successfully avoided trial by insisting that prosecuting witnesses be brought all the way from Oregon to testify against him.

Around September 1901, he made his way to Santa Barbara, California, and attempted to renew his career as a lawyer. He also renewed his habit of writing bad checks, and when lawmen sought him, he fled to Phoenix, Arizona.

In Phoenix he adopted a new identify, "the Reverend Joseph Anderson of El Paso" and took part in evangelistic meetings. He was arrested on a warrant sent from Santa Barbara, and an officer was dispatched from California to bring him back.

On the trip from Arizona to California in December 1901, a handcuffed Hayford made a nighttime escape by leaping from the train west of Blaisdell, Arizona. Local lawmen tracked him down the next day as he was looking for somebody to surrender to, and he was brought to Santa Barbara, where he was found guilty of obtaining money under false pretenses through cashing a bad check on a New York bank. He served six months in jail, being released in June 1902.

There is no further record of Hayford afterward.
