= Babatope Agbeyo =

Nigerian businessman

Babatope Michael Agbeyo
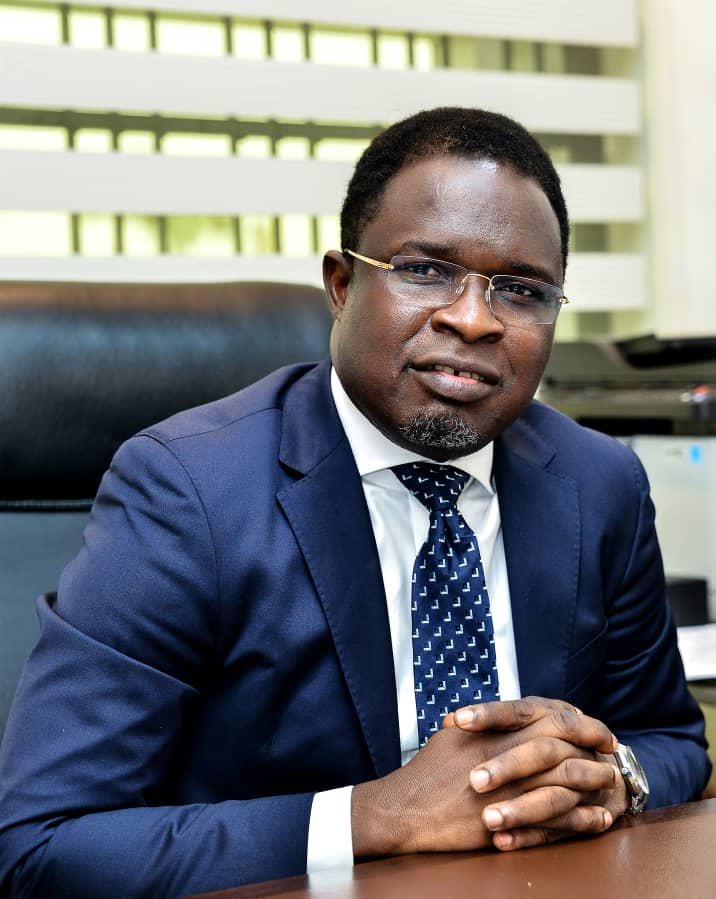
- Born: 13 July 1974; Usi Ekiti, Ekiti State, Nigeria
- Education: Obafemi Awolowo University; Birmingham City University, United Kingdom
- Occupation: Businessman, philanthropist

Babatope Michael Agbeyo, is a Nigerian businessman and Philanthropist. He is the Founder and Chairman of Cornfield Group of Companies and in 2017 was honored by the US State of Georgia for his commitment in youth empowerment and entrepreneurship.

== Early life and education ==
Agbeyo was born on June 13, 1974, in Usi Ekiti, a town in Ido/Osi Local Government Area of Ekiti State in Nigeria to a father who was a Cocoa Farmer, and a mother who was a trader.

He earned a Bachelor of Arts (Hons) in Dramatic Arts from Obafemi Awolowo University, Ile-Ife, Osun State in 1994 and started his career after National Youth Service Corps (NYSC) as a civil servant with the Institute of Peace and Conflict Resolution before proceeding to the United Kingdom for his master's degree in Media and Communications from Birmingham City University in 2002.

== Business ==
In 2005, he started Media Concepts International to provide media products, solutions, and services to diverse audiences across multiple platforms and in 2006, he birthed Cornfield Transnational Limited (CTL) to engage in the manufacturing of products that cut across Education, Entertainment, Information Technology, Telecommunications and more.

In 2011, Cornfield Group added Botosoft Technologies as its ICT business arm to provide solutions in Identity Management, Document Security and Brand Protection and Cornfield Foods and Beverages in 2017 to provide customer-centric fast moving consumer goods.

== Philanthropy ==
Dr. Agbeyo is a member of the board of directors of A. D. King Foundation with the mission of Youth Empowerment and non-violent social change strategies in the United States. He was conferred an Honorary Citizenship of Newark, New Jersey, US, in 2016, for his humanitarian and employment activities in Nigeria and a commendation for his dedication to public service read by the Georgia House of Representative, United States in 2016. His philanthropic activities include; grants for business and livelihood to widows and orphans, educational grants and sponsorship to underprivileged youths, infrastructural development and provision of basic amenities for local communities and institutions

== Awards and recognition ==
In 2017, he was awarded Doctor of Philosophy (Ph.D.) in Entrepreneurship (Honoris Causa) by Joseph Ayo Babalola University, Osun State, Nigeria and Doctor of Philosophy (Ph.D.) in Business Management (Honoris Causa) by the Federal University, Oye-Ekiti, Ekiti State, Nigeria.

In 2018, he was honored a special Gold award as one of the five Nigerians by the Chartered Institute of Public Resources Management and Politics, Ghana for his leadership, astuteness and sincere dedication towards the development of Africa.

== Personal life ==
Dr. Agbeyo is married with children. His hobbies include reading, and watching movies.
