= Suzanne Oboler =

Suzanne Oboler is a Peruvian-American scholar who was Professor of Latin American and Latina/o Studies at the John Jay College of Criminal Justice of the City University of New York before she retired from teaching.

Oboler is the author of Ethnic Labels, Latino Lives: Identity and the Politics of (Re)Presentation in the United States and was the founding editor of the journal Latino Studies (2002–2012). She has edited several books, including Latinos and Citizenship: The Dilemma of Belonging; Behind Bars: Latino/as and Prison in the United States (2006), and co-edited Neither Enemies nor Friends: Latinos, Blacks, Afro-Latinos (2009). Oboler is also co-editor-in-chief of The Oxford Encyclopedia of Latino/as in the United States.
