= Judy Lucero =

Judy A. Lucero (June 12, 1945 - April 1973) (pen name, #21918) was a Chicana prisoner poet, cited as a legend among Latina feminists. Lucero had a particularly tough life, becoming a heroin addict after being introduced to drugs at the age of eleven by one of her stepfathers, losing two children and dying in prison in 1973 at the age of 27 from a brain hemorrhage. She had been serving a 1-5 year sentence for attempted forgery.

== Poetry ==
Lucero's poems were published in 1973 in De Colores Journal, Memoriam: Poems of Judy Lucero after her death.

In her poem "I Speak an Illusion" she "articulates the contradictions of her Chicana experience while lamenting the apparently unbreakable bonds that incarcerate her."

Juan Gómez-Quiñones and Irene Vásquez highlight her work as advocating women's strength, such as in "Jail-Life Walk" which they refer to as "simply gripping".
