= Thomas Spencer Harris =

American journalist

Thomas Spencer Harris (1836 or 1831 – 1893) was an early California newspaperman. Born in 1836 (or 1831) in Ohio, Harris probably hailed from Cleveland. He traveled to the Pacific Coast in 1859, and three years later, joined the 2nd Regiment California Volunteer Cavalry. From 1874 through 1883, he worked as an editor and newspaper publisher in California mining camps, and founded ten newspapers, including the Panamint News (November 26, 1874), the first in the Death Valley area.
