= Alvaro Luna Hernandez =

Prison abolition activist

- Other names: Xinachtli
- Citizenship: United States
- Occupation: Activist
- Movement: Chicano Liberation & Prison abolition movement
- Criminal charge: Aggravated assault of a police officer
- Criminal penalty: 50 years
- Criminal status: Incarcerated at McConnell Unit
- Website: freealvaro.net

Alvaro Luna Hernandez is a Chicano liberation and prison abolition activist from Alpine, Texas. He is currently serving a 50-year sentence for aggravated assault of a police officer. He is housed at McConnell Unit prison. He spends his time as "Jailhouse Lawyer", also known as an amateur attorney, assisting indigent inmates he believes to be innocent or deserving in their pursuit of justice.

== 1975 arrest ==
In September 1975, Hernandez was arrested for allegedly murdering Robert Anthony Beard, a former Sul Ross State University student and motel clerk. Several days after the murder occurred police arrested a former motel employee named Palmira Hernandez (no relation) on unrelated drug charges. Under interrogation Palmira allegedly claimed to have witnessed Alvaro Hernandez who at the time was a local political activist commit the murder as part of a robbery. No money was actually taken from the motel and no other evidence connected Hernandez to the crime. The witness, Palmira Hernandez, was granted full immunity for a number of unrelated offenses in exchange for her testimony and later recanted her statements, stating her confession was coerced by the police and she was instructed to testify that Alvaro Hernandez committed the murders under threat of prosecution.

== Jailhouse political organizing ==
While imprisoned, Hernandez studied Mexican-American history, the prison system, and revolutionary political theory, along with local laws usable in his and others' defense. Hernandez fought against institutional corruption he saw through constitutional and civil rights lawsuits, hunger strikes, work stoppages and yard takeovers, and was one of the "seven other prisoners" whose civil suits were merged into what later became the landmark Ruiz v. Estelle victory for prison reform against the Texas Department of Corrections. While incarcerated in Huntsville, Texas, he met Ricardo Adalpe Guerra, a Mexican national who had been convicted of killing a Houston area police officer, at the time on death row in the cell next to Alvaro. He spent much of his sentence in solitary confinement (allegedly due to retaliation from the prison), before being cleared and freed in 1991, due in part to investigative reporting by former Houston Post staffer Paul Harasim.

== Activist career ==
Hernandez settled in Houston with his wife. Immediately following his release, he became the national coordinator of the Ricardo Adape Guerra defense committee and is credited as being a major influence in Adape Guerra's conviction being overturned. He founded a national civil rights group on behalf of Mexican-Americans, The National Movement of La Raza, and did extensive community work with "Stop the Violence Youth Committee, and the Prisoners Solidarity Committee". Hernandez also helped to negotiate truces between Hispanic street gangs in Pasadena, Texas, following a spate of shootings. He also worked internationally, speaking in 1993 to the United Nations General Assembly regarding the United States' mistreatment of political prisoners.

== 1996 arrest ==
In 1996, while organizing against police brutality in Chicano communities an officer came to Hernandez home on July 18, to arrest him on a robbery charge. During the encounter Hernandez knocked the gun from the officer's hand while it was pointed at him before fleeing. An act that Hernandez claimed was in self defense as he says the officer had drawn his weapon in the middle of their conversation intending to shoot him while unarmed. Hernandez later surrendered to police and though he was found to have been innocent of the robbery, was convicted for assaulting the police officer by knocking the gun from the officers hand and given a fifty-year sentence. Since then Hernandez has been likened to a political prisoner by many human rights activists who have pushed the Inter-American Commission on Human Rights and Organization of American States into investigating his case.
