= September 1974 =

Month of 1974

<<	September 1974					>>
Su	Mo	Tu	We	Th	Fr	Sa
1	2	3	4	5	6	7
8	9	10	11	12	13	14
15	16	17	18	19	20	21
22	23	24	25	26	27	28
29	30

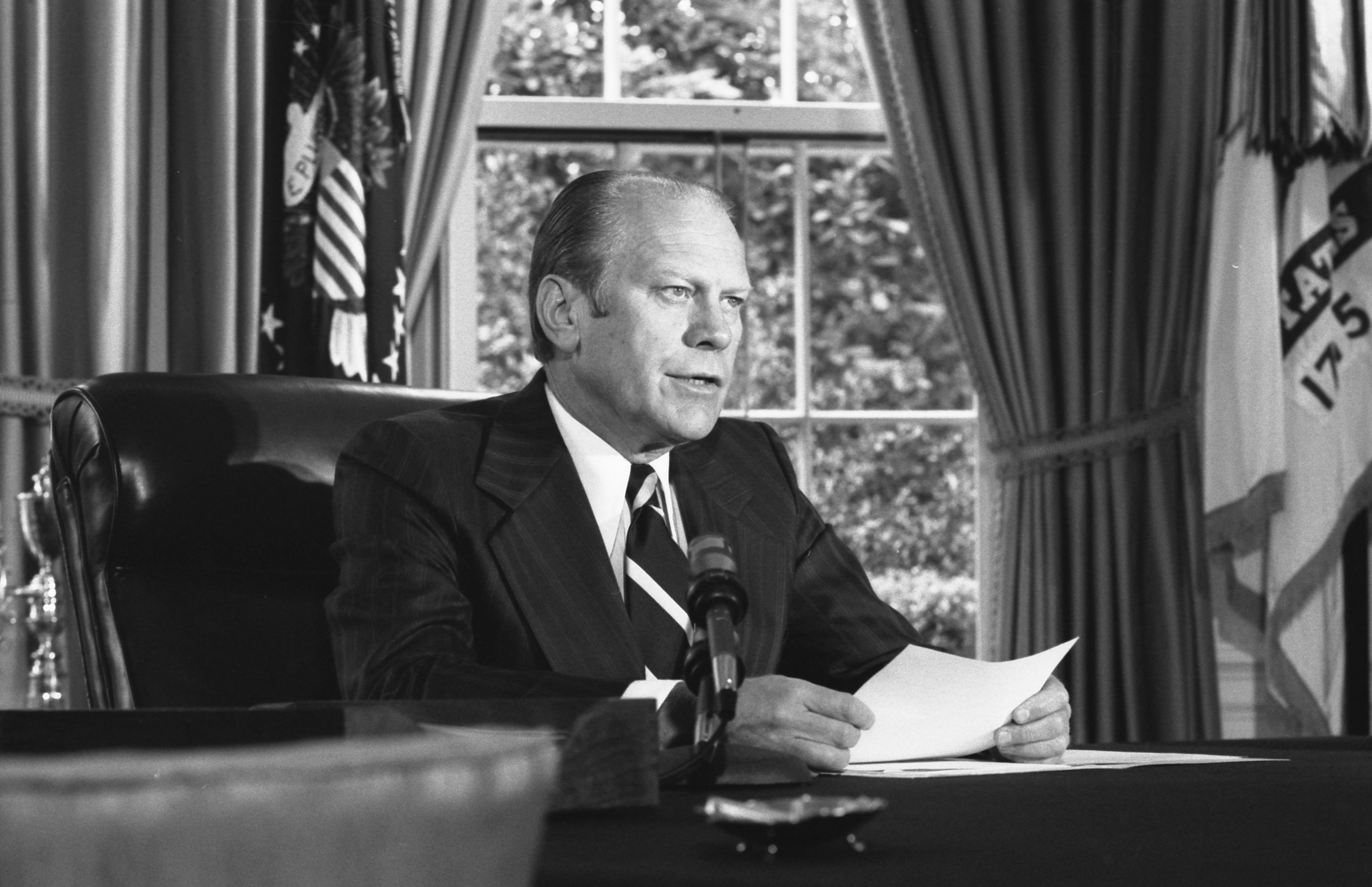
September 8, 1974: U.S. President Ford announces his decision to pardon former President Richard Nixon

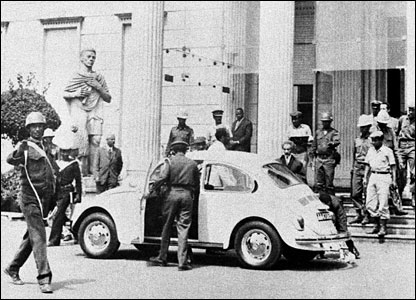
September 12, 1974: Ethiopia's Emperor Haile Selassie (standing behind rear window of car) is overthrown

The following events occurred in September 1974:

== September 1, 1974 (Sunday) ==
- Voting was held in Nicaragua for president and for the 70 seats of the Cámara de Diputados and the 30 seats of the Senado. President Anastasio Somoza Debayle won almost 92 percent of the vote and Edmundo Paguaga Irías received a little more than 8%. Under the national constitution, Somoza's Partido Liberal Nacionalista received 60% of the seats in both houses.

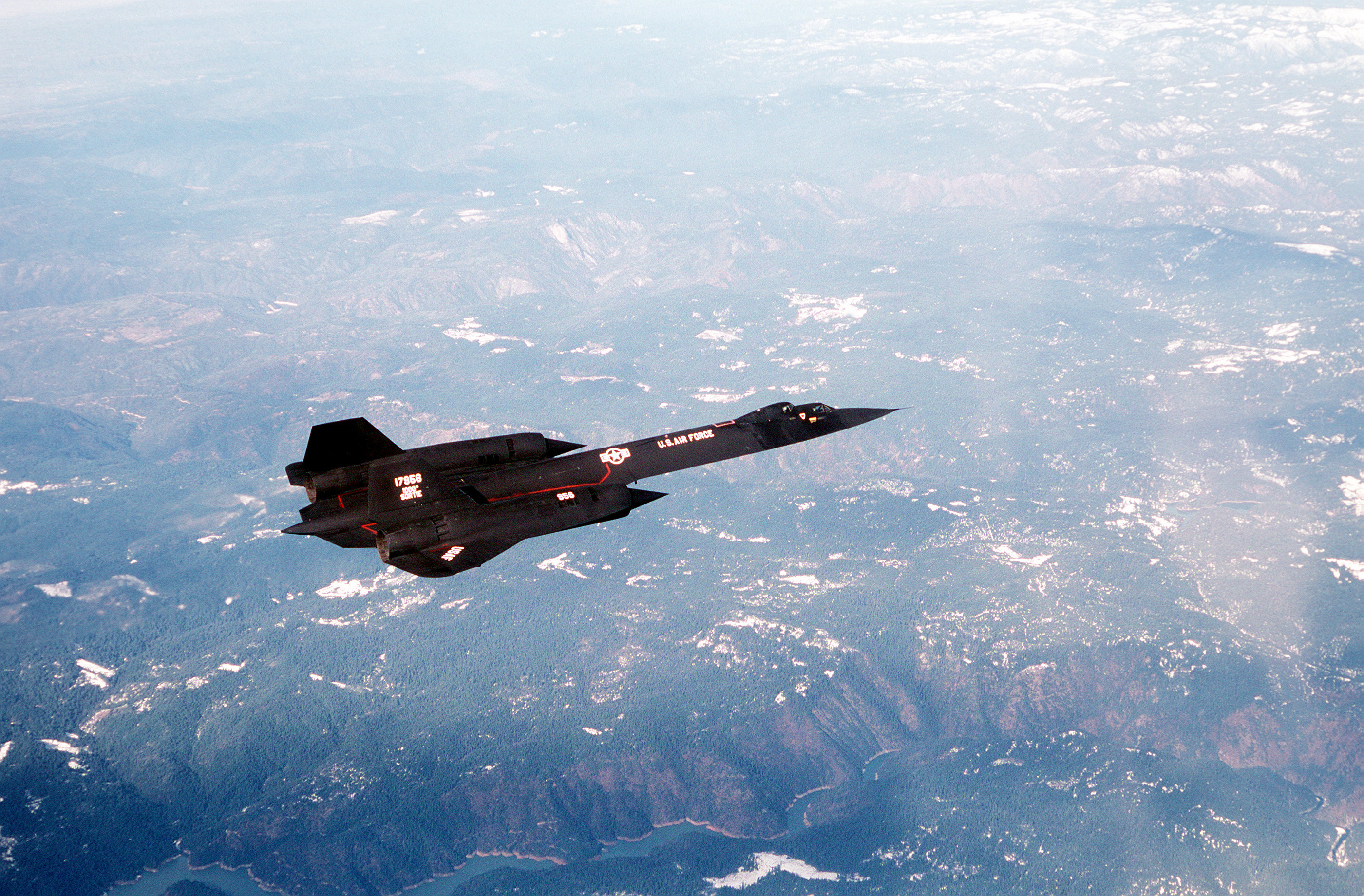
An SR-71 Blackbird in flight

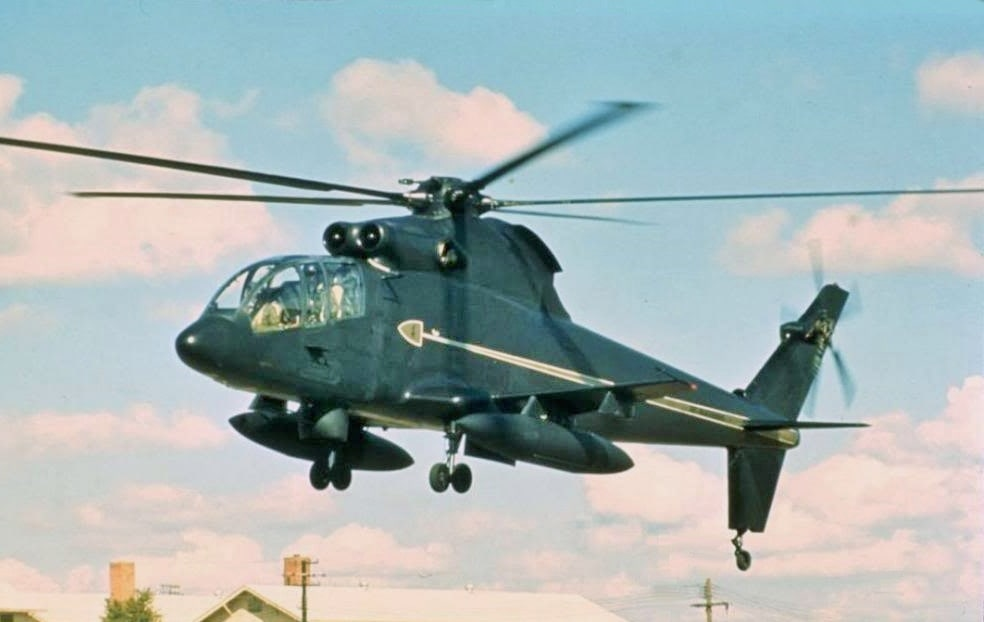
The Sikorsky S-67 Blackhawk

- A U.S. Air Force SR-71 reconnaissance airplane set a new speed record for a transatlantic crossing, flying from New York City to London in less than two hours. Flown by USAF Majors James V. Sullivan and Noel F. Widdifield, the SR-71 had crossed North America in subsonic flight from California, refueled twice in mid-air until reaching New York City's airspace, before beginning its attaining an average speed of 1,817 miles per hour (2,924 km/h) as it crossed the ocean. The crew covered the 3,490-mile (5,620 km) flight in 1 hour 55 minutes 42 seconds and landed at the Farnborough International Airshow in England. The crossing took less than half as long as the previous record, set by a Royal Navy Phantom, of 4 hours, 35 minutes.
- Later that day at the Farnborough airshow, the prototype of the U.S. Army S-67 Blackhawk attack helicopter crashed, fatally injuring its two test pilots, Stewart Craig and Kurt Cannon. The crash ended any further plans to produce the S-67.
- A medical board cleared Generalissimo Francisco Franco, who had delegated his powers as Head of the Spanish State to Prince Juan Carlos de Borbón on July 19, to resume his regular duties, which Franco did the next day.
- Three separate missing persons cases began on the same day in the United States. In Akron, Ohio, 17-year-old Linda Pagano disappeared after arguing with her stepfather and leaving his apartment. Pagano's remains were discovered in Strongsville, Ohio, five months later in February, but would remain unidentified until 2018. Her murder remains unsolved.
- Martha Morrison, aged 17, disappeared from Portland, Oregon. Morrison's remains, and those of Carol Platt Valenzuela, were discovered on October 12 near Vancouver, Washington. One woman was immediately identified as Valenzuela; the other was identified as Morrison by DNA profiling in 2015. Warren Forrest would be convicted of Morrison's murder on February 1, 2023.
- Richard Cowden, his wife Belinda June Cowden, and their children, 5-year-old David James Phillips and 5-month-old Melissa Dawn Cowden, disappeared from their campground in Applegate Valley near Copper, Jackson County, Oregon. Their bodies would be discovered eight months later, in April 1975. The case remains unsolved.

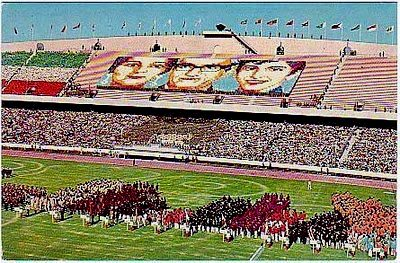
Opening ceremonies of the 1974 Asian Games

- The 1974 Asian Games began in Tehran, Iran, and would continue through September 16.
- At the hurling championship of Ireland, held before 62,071 spectators at Croke Park in Dublin, Kilkenny defeated Limerick, 3-19 to 1-13 (equivalent to 28 to 16).
- Boxer Charles "Big Boy" Cutajar of Malta sustained a cut vein in his head during a fight with Italian boxer Francesco Piccanelli, who won by knockout. Cutajar died from a hemorrhage the following day.
- Born:
  - Burn Gorman, American-born English actor known for the BBC science fiction show Torchwood and the HBO series Game of Thrones; in Los Angeles
  - Filip Nikolic, Serbian-born French singer and leader of the band 2Be3; in Saint-Ouen-sur-Seine, Île-de-France, France (died 2009, heart attack caused by sleeping medication)
- Died:
  - John F. Shelley, 68, American politician, U.S. Representative for California for 33 years and Mayor of San Francisco from 1964 to 1968, died of lung cancer.
  - Harold L. Yochum, 71, American theologian and church leader, former president of Capital University, died of a heart attack.

== September 2, 1974 (Monday) ==
- The Australian plant genus Alexgeorgea was discovered by American botanist Sherwin Carlquist, beginning with the flower species Alexgeorgea subterranea.
- The Employee Retirement Income Security Act of 1974, providing for minimum standards for pension plans in private industry, was signed into law.
- A tornado touched down in New York City for the first time since storm records were kept, striking the Bronx.
- In Kruševac, Socialist Republic of Serbia, Yugoslavia, 18-year-old Milica Kostić jumped from a 12th-floor window to escape being raped by a group of 5 young men, telling police afterwards that it was the only way to save her honor. She would die of her injuries two days later.
- Two yachts which had belonged to former British Prime Minister Edward Heath, both named Morning Cloud, were lost within 24 hours in stormy weather on the English Channel. Morning Cloud I tore loose from her moorings and was driven onto rocks off Gorey Castle, Jersey. A large wave struck Morning Cloud III off the Sussex coast. The yacht capsized and sank, and two members of the 7-man crew, one of whom was Heath's godson, drowned.
- Cale Yarborough won the 1974 Southern 500, a NASCAR Winston Cup Series race, at Darlington Raceway in Darlington, South Carolina.
- Sylvester Williams, a fullback on the Florida A&M football team, collapsed and died on the practice field at the age of 20.
- Born: Shirley-Anne Somerville, Scottish Government minister since 2018, Scottish National Party member; in Kirkcaldy, Fife
- Died:
  - Joseph A. Beirne, 63, American labor union leader, president of the Communications Workers of America, died of cancer.
  - Wallace A. Ross, 52, American advertising executive, founder of the Clio Awards
  - Moses Soyer, 74, Russian-born American realist painter
  - David Barksdale, 27, African-American gang leader who founded the Black Disciples, died of kidney failure.

== September 3, 1974 (Tuesday) ==
- One man died, and another was injured, in the explosion of a 5,000-gallon gasoline storage tank in Wareham, Massachusetts.
- Philippe Prost, a member of the French national junior basketball team, died of a heart attack at the age of 18 during a game in Roanne, France.
- Born: Jen Royle, American sports reporter and chef
- Died:
  - John Thomas Baldwin, 63, American botanist
  - Aurora Bertrana, 74, Catalan cellist and writer
  - Marie Ames Byrd, 85, widow of Rear Admiral Richard E. Byrd and namesake of Marie Byrd Land, the largest unclaimed territory on Earth.
  - Harry Partch, 73, American composer, died of a heart attack.

== September 4, 1974 (Wednesday) ==
- U.S. President Gerald Ford named George H. W. Bush, the chair of the Republican National Committee, to be the new Chief of the U.S. Liaison Office to the People's Republic of China, succeeding David K. E. Bruce. A White House official was quoted as saying, "George Bush was a strong and viable candidate to be Ford's Vice President until the last minute. He is somebody the President holds in high regard."
- The United States and the Communist nation of East Germany (officially, the German Democratic Republic) announced jointly that they had agreed to establish full diplomatic relations. Former U.S. Senator John Sherman Cooper of Kentucky was nominated as U.S. Ambassador to East Germany, while Rolf Sieber, rector of the Berlin School of Economics and Law, was designated as the East German ambassador to the U.S., with embassies to be opened in December.
- In the Pacific Ocean, a burial at sea ceremony was held aboard the Hughes Glomar Explorer for six Soviet Navy sailors recovered from the wreckage of K-129 during Project Azorian. Videotaped and classified, film of the ceremony would be given by the U.S. Director of Central Intelligence Robert Gates to Russian President Boris Yeltsin on a visit to Moscow in 1992.
- India's lower house of Parliament, the Lok Sabha, voted 310 to 7 to make the kingdom of Sikkim one of the states of India, subject to approval by the Sikkimese government. The upper house, the Rajya Sabha, followed suit on September 7 in a 168 to 8 vote.
- Born:
  - Naved Ashraf (born Mohammad Naved Ashraf Qureshi), Pakistani cricketer; in Rawalpindi, Punjab, Pakistan
  - Carmit Bachar, American singer (The Pussycat Dolls); in Los Angeles, California
  - Nona Gaye, American singer and fashion model; in Washington, D.C.
  - Lincoln Roberts, West Indian cricketer; in Accord, Tobago
- Died:

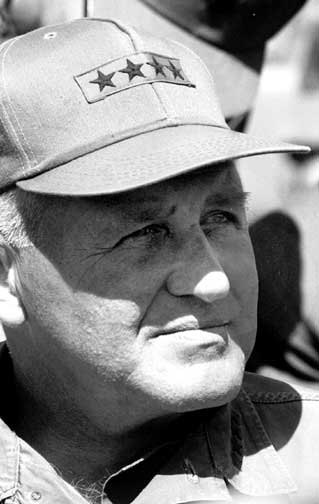
General Abrams

  - U.S. Army General Creighton Abrams, 59, Chief of Staff of the United States Army, died of complications from the removal of a cancerous lung. In 1980, the M1 Abrams battle tank would be named in his honor.
  - Marcel Achard, 75, French playwright and scriptwriter, died of diabetes.
  - Hubbell Robinson, 68, American broadcasting executive for CBS, died of lung cancer.

== September 5, 1974 (Thursday) ==
- Three men were arrested at Westminster Abbey shortly after midnight for an alleged attempt to steal the Stone of Scone, the ancient artifact used in the coronations of monarchs of Scotland.

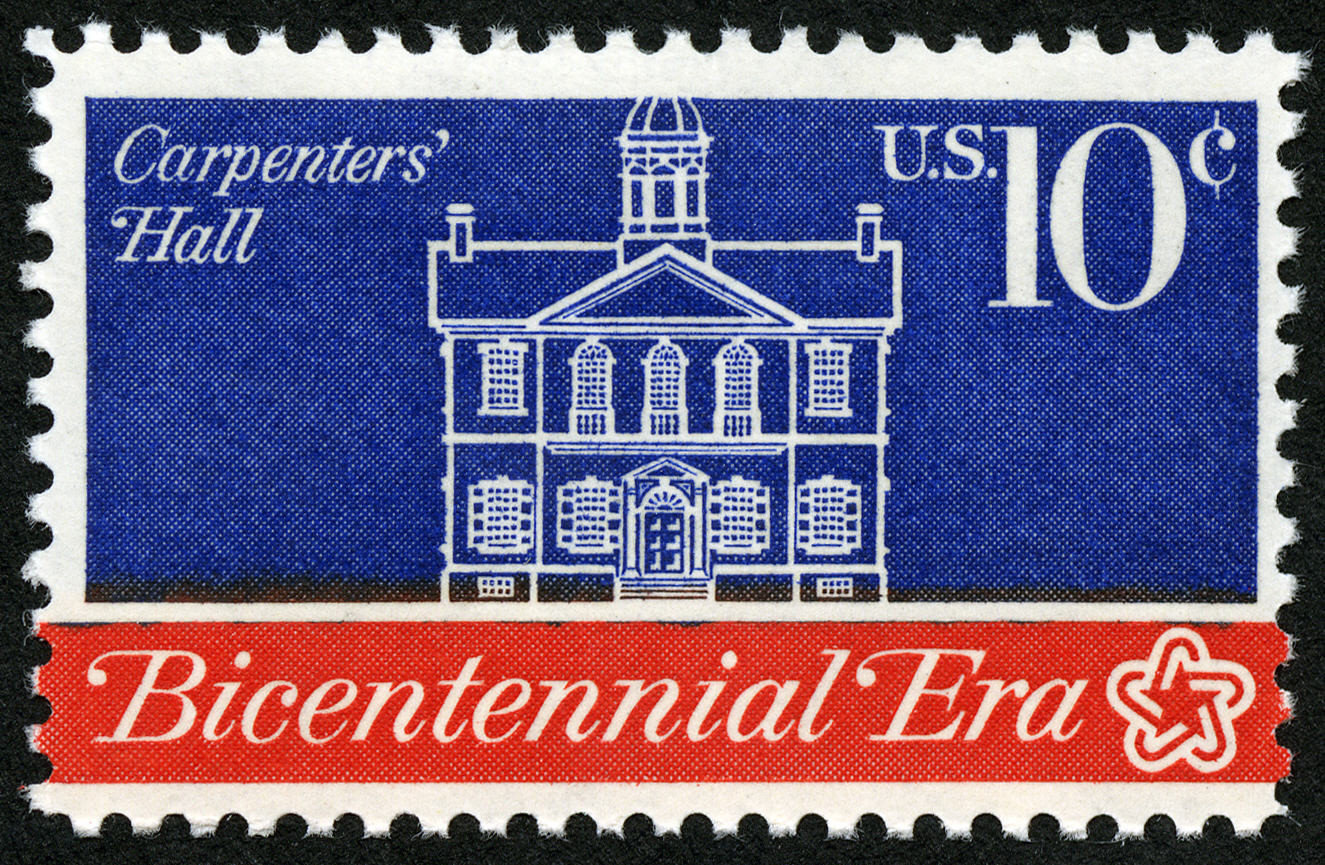
1974 Bicentennial stamp depicting Carpenters' Hall

- A two-day Bicentennial reconvening of the First Continental Congress began in Carpenters' Hall, Philadelphia, Pennsylvania. The current governors of the 13 original American colonies (Note: Georgia was not represented at the original First Continental Congress.) had been invited to serve as delegates at the reenactment; all of them were present except Francis Sargent of Massachusetts, who was campaigning for renomination. U.S. President Ford spoke at a banquet on the evening of the second day. Unlike the original 1774 Congress, the reconvening included female and African-American delegates.
- In Kanawha County, West Virginia, hundreds of coal miners stayed off the job to join protesters demanding the removal of school textbooks which they regarded as containing inappropriate content.
- One of the falcon statuettes made for the 1941 film The Maltese Falcon, valued at $200, was stolen from the Los Angeles County Museum of Art, where it was on loan from Warner Bros.
- A gas explosion in Oxnard, California, killed a Southern California Gas Company foreman who was evacuating residents and injured five other people.
- Died: Jimmy Swinnerton, 98, American cartoonist (The Little Bears, Little Jimmy) and landscape painter, died of complications from a broken leg.

== September 6, 1974 (Friday) ==
- A caucus of New Zealand Labour Party (NZLP) members of Parliament voted, 44 to 6, to choose Finance Minister Bill Rowling rather than Deputy Prime Minister Hugh Watt to be the new NZLP chairman and Prime Minister of New Zealand. The choice filled the vacancy left by the death of Norman Kirk on August 31. Health Minister Bob Tizard was chosen as Deputy Prime Minister.
- In a continuation of protests in South Korea following the August 15 assassination attempt on President Park Chung Hee by a Japanese-born North Korean sympathizer, a crowd attacked the Japanese Embassy in Seoul, breaking windows, removing the flag of Japan from the roof and setting a car on fire. Police responded with tear gas. During further protests on September 9, 15 demonstrators cut off their little fingers, saying they wished to present them to the Embassy.
- Born:
  - Tim Henman, English professional tennis player; in Oxford
  - Nina Persson, Swedish singer for The Cardigans; in Örebro
  - Justin Whalin, American TV actor known for portraying Jimmy Olsen in Lois & Clark: The New Adventures of Superman; in San Francisco
- Died:
  - Olga Baclanova, 81, Russian-born film and stage actress nicknamed "The Russian Tigress", known for the 1932 film Freaks, died of lung cancer.
  - LaVere Redfield, 76, eccentric American multi-millionaire convicted of tax evasion
  - Patricia Cutts, 48, English film and television actress, committed suicide by barbiturate poisoning, shortly after accepting the role of Blanche Hunt on the long-running British programme Coronation Street.
  - Otto Kruger, 89, American film and TV actor, died of a stroke.
  - Michael Benthall CBE, 55, English theater director for the Royal Victoria Theatre
  - Frank W. Buxton, 96, American journalist, former editor of the Boston Herald and winner of the 1924 Pulitzer Prize for Editorial Writing

== September 7, 1974 (Saturday) ==
- The Lusaka Accord was signed in Zambia between the government of Portugal and representatives of FRELIMO (Frente de Libertação de Moçambique), with Portugal recognizing the independence of the southeast African nation of Mozambique and ending the war of independence that had gone on for almost 10 years. The Republic of Mozambique would become independent on June 25, 1975.
- The Constitution of Pakistan was amended to create and maintain a statistical database of all citizens of Pakistan, with each citizen to have a government-issued National Identity Card (NIC). Another amendment set an official definition of "Muslim" ("a person who believes in the unity and oneness of Allah, in the absolute and unqualified finality of the Prophethood of Muhammad (Peace be upon Him), the last of the Prophets, and does not believe in, or recognize as a prophet or religious reformer, any person who claimed or claims to be a prophet, in any sense of the word or of any description whatsoever, after Muhammad (Peace be upon Him)") and "non-Muslim" ("a person who is not a Muslim and includes a person belonging to the Christian, Hindu, Sikh, Buddhist or Parsi community, a person of the Qadiani group or the Lahori group (who call themselves 'Ahmadis' or by another name), or a Baha'i, and a person belonging to any of the scheduled castes.")
- The crash of a Garuda Indonesia airliner killed 33 of 36 people on board. The Fokker F27 Friendship turboprop struck an airport building while landing in poor weather at Bandar Lampung after a flight from Jakarta.
- The Juvenile Justice and Delinquency Prevention Act (JJDPA) was signed into law by U.S. President Ford. Though individual states of the U.S. were free not to follow the guidelines of the Act, only those states that complied with the federal standards were eligible for federal grants for state juvenile programs.

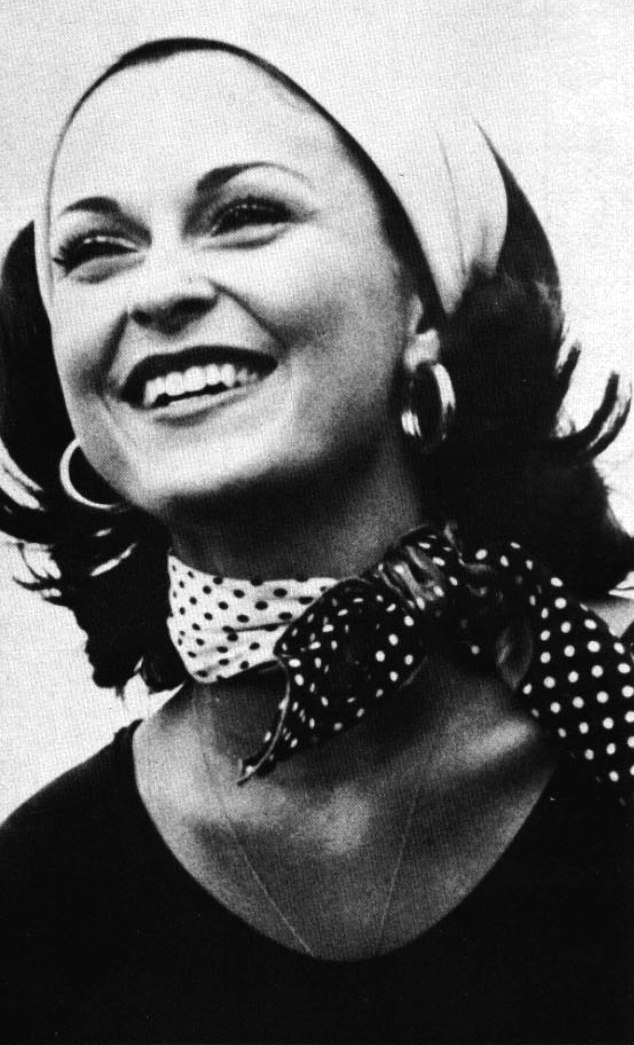
Shirley Cothran in 1975

- In Atlantic City, New Jersey, Shirley Cothran, Miss Texas, won the Miss America 1975 pageant.
- Professional boxer Bobby Chacon of the U.S. won the World Boxing Council featherweight championship by defeating former World Boxing Association super-featherweight champion Alfredo Marcano of Venezuela. Chacon would die on the 42nd anniversary of his title bout on September 7, 2016.
- Born: Glenn Ljungström, Swedish guitarist for In Flames and The Resistance; in Gothenburg
- Died:
  - Frank Smith Horne, 75, American poet, Harlem Renaissance figure and government official, died of arteriosclerosis.
  - Katherine Hupalo, 84, Ukrainian-American actress
  - Juan Antonio Ipiña, 62, Spanish football manager

== September 8, 1974 (Sunday) ==
- U.S. President Gerald Ford made an unpopular decision that would ultimately cost him the 1976 U.S. presidential election, as he announced in a nationally televised speech that he had granted a "full, free and absolute pardon" to his predecessor, former President Richard Nixon, for any crimes that Nixon might have committed during the Nixon presidency. Ford said in his speech, "I have come to a decision which I felt I should tell you and all of my fellow American citizens, as soon as I was certain in my own mind and in my own conscience that it is the right thing to do." He added that the Watergate scandal "could go on and on and on, or someone must write the end to it. I have concluded that only I can do that, and if I can, I must." He noted that, "I am compelled to conclude that many months and perhaps more years will have to pass before Richard Nixon could obtain a fair trial by jury in any jurisdiction of the United States," and that "During this long period of delay and potential litigation, ugly passions would again be aroused. And our people would again be polarized in their opinions. And the credibility of our free institutions of government would again be challenged at home and abroad." Ford then read the text of Proclamation 4311 aloud. In 2001, Ford was presented the Profile in Courage Award, and U.S. Senator Ted Kennedy said, "At a time of national turmoil, America was fortunate that it was Gerald Ford who took the helm of the storm-tossed ship of state. Unlike many of us at the time, President Ford recognized that the nation had to move forward, and could not do so if there was a continuing effort to prosecute former President Nixon. So President Ford made a courageous decision, one that historians now say cost him his office, and he pardoned Richard Nixon... time has a way of clarifying past events, and now we see that President Ford was right. His courage and dedication to our country made it possible for us to begin the process of healing and put the tragedy of Watergate behind us."
- TWA Flight 841 crashed into the Ionian Sea 18 minutes after takeoff from Athens toward Rome, after a terrorist bomb exploded in the cargo hold. With control no longer possible, the Boeing 707 made a steep climb and stalled. All 88 people aboard were killed.

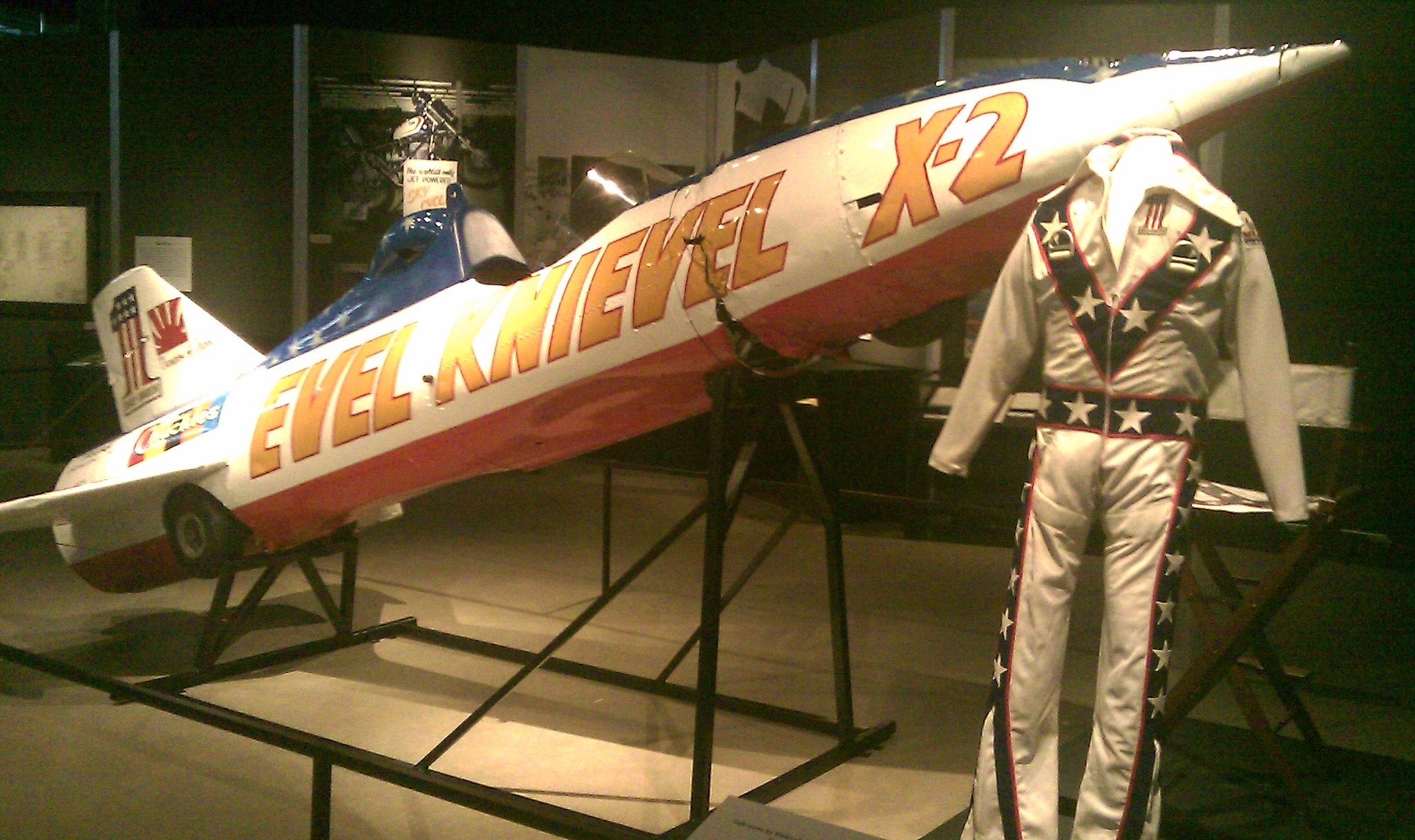
Knievel's Skycycle X-2 and his trademark jumpsuit

- American daredevil Evel Knievel made a failed attempt to jump over the Snake River Canyon in Idaho aboard the Skycycle X-2, a steam-powered rocket. Although Knievel cleared the canyon, a premature parachute deployment caused the rocket to drift back to the launch side, landing at the bottom of the canyon near the river.
- Elections were held in the tiny (population 19,300) European Republic of San Marino for all 60 seats of the nation's Consiglio Grande e Generale, and women were allowed to participate for the first time. No party won the required 31 seats for a majority, but the Sammarinese Christian Democratic Party won 25 seats to retain control. The Sammarinese Communist Party was second with 15.
- English progressive rock musician Robert Wyatt gave a concert at the Theatre Royal, Drury Lane, in London. Bootleg recordings of the 1974 concert would become available in the 1980s, and Wyatt's album Theatre Royal Drury Lane 8th September 1974 would be released in 2005, more than thirty years after the concert.
- American stunt pilot Shannon Leithoff was killed in the crash of her biplane in front of a crowd of 100,000 at an air show in South Weymouth, Massachusetts.
- The first championship for women's soccer football in West Germany was won by TuS Wörrstadt, 4–0 over DJK Eintracht Gelsenkirchen-Erle in the final, sanctioned by the Deutscher Fußball-Bund.
- A Little League banquet at a Chicago church led to 109 diners being treated for food poisoning.
- Died:
  - Dhani Nivat, 88, Thai Prince who served as Regent of Thailand for 21 months in 1951 and 1952 while King Bhumibol Adulyadej was attending college in Switzerland
  - Clarence Senior, 71, American socialist political activist, former Executive Secretary of the Socialist Party of America, died of a cerebral hemorrhage.
  - Wolfgang Windgassen, 60, German director of the Stuttgart Opera and operatic heldentenor known for Wagnerian roles, died of a heart attack.

== September 9, 1974 (Monday) ==
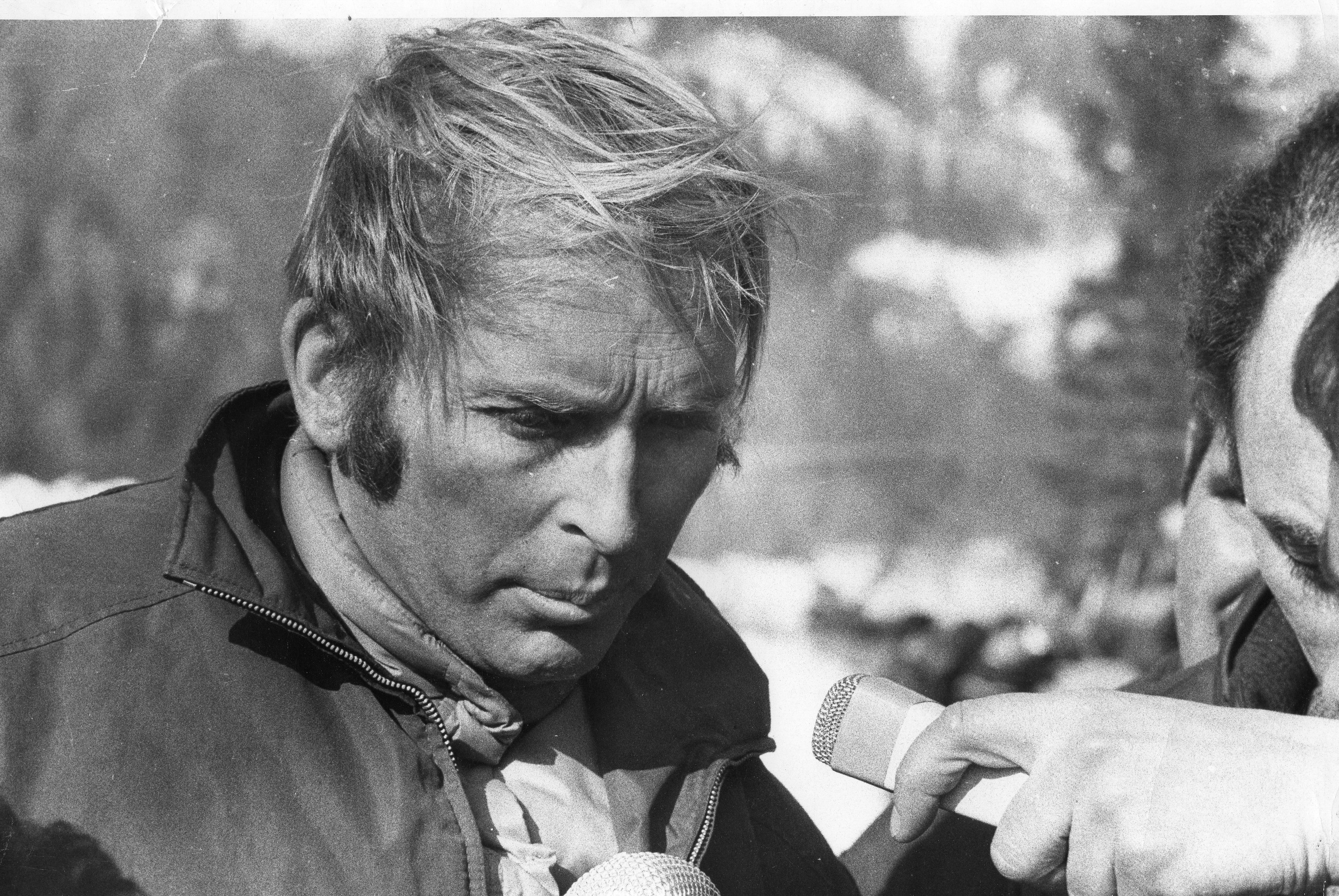
Gérard Devouassoux in 1971

- Six climbers died in an avalanche on the West Shoulder of Mount Everest. French mountaineer Gérard Devouassoux, 34, and five Nepalese Sherpa were killed; mountaineer Claude Ancey survived.
- A bus crash in Zambia killed 26 people.
- An early morning fire at a nursing home in St. Joseph, Missouri, killed 6 elderly women and an 11-year-old boy.
- Around 4,000 people attended a rally against desegregation busing at Boston City Hall Plaza, sponsored by the organization Restore Our Alienated Rights (R.O.A.R.). Massachusetts U.S. Senator Ted Kennedy, who attempted to speak at the rally to urge calm, was chased by the angry crowd, which threw tomatoes and eggs at him.
- Born:
  - Igor Rotenberg, Russian billionaire businessman and co-owner of the Stroygazmontazh conglomerate; in Leningrad, Russian SFSR, Soviet Union (now Saint Petersburg in Russia).
  - Leah O'Brien, American 3-time Olympic champion softball pitcher and honoree at the USA Softball Hall of Fame; in Garden Grove, California
- Died:
  - Choi Tu-son, 79, former Prime Minister of South Korea 1963 to 1964
  - Billie Nelson, 32, British Grand Prix motorcycle racer, died in the early hours of the morning after crashing into the crowd the previous day at the 1974 250cc Yugoslav Grand Prix at the Opatija Circuit, injuring several spectators.
  - Alison Worstead Kerr, 59, Australian counselor and wife of the incumbent Governor-General of Australia, Sir John Kerr
  - Gertrude Perlmann, 62, Austro-Hungarian-born American biochemist and structural biologist, died of cancer.

== September 10, 1974 (Tuesday) ==
The Flag of Guinea-Bissau

- The government of Portugal recognized the independence of its former colony, Portuguese Guinea, almost one year after the West African nation had declared its independence as the Republic of Guinea-Bissau. Guinea-Bissau, led by Luís Cabral, had declared its independence on September 24, 1973.
- Lou Brock of the St. Louis Cardinals set the Major League Baseball record for most bases stolen in a season. Playing against the visiting Philadelphia Phillies in the Cards' 142nd game, Brock tied the record of 104 (set by Maury Wills in the 154-game 1932 season), then had his 105th stolen base in the seventh inning.
- The controversial made-for-TV film Born Innocent was broadcast on NBC as the U.S. network's NBC World Premiere Movie starting at 8:00 pm Eastern Time (7:00 Central), with content never seen before on U.S. television, including a rape scene inside a juvenile detention center. Starring Linda Blair, Born Innocent was the highest-rated television movie to air in the United States in 1974, but would lead to the creation of a family viewing policy by the National Association of Broadcasters.
- Born:
  - Ben Wallace, American basketball player who was bypassed in the NBA draft but won the NBA Defensive Player of the Year Award; in White Hall, Alabama
  - Mirko Cro Cop (ring name of Mirko Filipović), Croatian kickboxer and mixed martial arts fighter, 2014 IGF champion; in Vinkovci, SR Croatia, Yugoslavia
  - Ryan Phillippe, American film and TV actor known for Shooter; in New Castle, Delaware
- Died: Melchior Wańkowicz, 82, Polish book author and journalist

== September 11, 1974 (Wednesday) ==
- The crash of Eastern Air Lines Flight 212 killed 72 of the 82 people on board, with 3 of them dying within the month. The McDonnell Douglas DC-9 jet was approaching the airport in Charlotte, North Carolina after departing Charleston, South Carolina with a final scheduled destination of Chicago. The NTSB determined that the probable cause of the accident was a "lack of altitude awareness at critical points during the approach due to poor cockpit discipline in that the crew did not follow prescribed procedures."
- The Omega 7 anti-Castro terrorist group was created by Cuban exiles in the U.S. and based in Miami. Despite having no more than 20 members, the group was responsible for at least 55 bombings and other attacks over an eight-year period.
- Six reserve members of the Parachute Regiment 15th Battalion, all from Scotland, drowned in the Kiel Canal near Osterrade in West Germany. They were part of the largest combined military exercise in the history of NATO up to that time, Exercise Bold Guard, with 40,000 people. The group had undershot their drop zone due to an unforeseen wind from an undetectable temperature inversion. West German army officer Siegfried Mattern, who was on safety duty for the drop, subsequently hanged himself even though his superior had told him he was not to blame for the accident.
- Philippine dissident Jose W. Diokno, a former Senator and Secretary of Justice in the Philippine government, was released from imprisonment almost two years after having been arrested on September 23, 1972.
- The NBC television drama Little House on the Prairie, based on the works of Laura Ingalls Wilder, began the first of 204 episodes over nine seasons, following a successful pilot that had been broadcast on March 30. It would continue until March 21, 1983.
- A twin-engine private plane exploded and crashed 12 miles (19 km) northwest of Austin, Minnesota, killing a minister who was flying the plane and five members of his congregation.
- Born: Orlando Duque, Colombian high diver, winner of the first gold medal in the sport (at the 2013 World Aquatics Championships), FINA High Diver of the Year 2013 and 2014; in Cali
- Died:
  - James W. Colbert Jr., 53, Vice President for Academic Affairs at the Medical University of South Carolina, and his sons Paul and Peter, father and brothers of Stephen Colbert, died in the crash of Eastern Air Lines Flight 212.
  - Lois Lenski, 80, American children's author and illustrator, winner of the Newbery Medal for Strawberry Girl

== September 12, 1974 (Thursday) ==
- Haile Selassie, Emperor of Ethiopia since 1930, was overthrown by officers of the Derg, members of the Ethiopian Army and police, bringing an end to the Solomonic dynasty that had ruled since 1270.
- The Derg proclaimed the 60-year-old Crown Prince, Asfaw Wossen Tafari, as the new King (but not Emperor) of Ethiopia. Prince Asfaw, who was in Switzerland for medical treatment, wisely declined to accept the invitation, and avoided imprisonment and execution that was meted out to other members of the former royal family.
- The longest game in Major League Baseball history to be played to a conclusion came to an end in the 25th inning, 7 hours and 4 minutes after it had started, as baseball's St. Louis Cardinals defeated the host New York Mets, 4 to 3, in the 25th inning. The game had been tied, 3 to 3, after nine innings and then went 15 additional scoreless innings before two Mets errors gave the Cardinals' Bake McBride the opportunity to run from first base to home plate.
- In the U.S. state of Massachusetts, court-ordered desegregation busing began on the first day of school in Boston. While busing was successful in 79 of Boston's 80 schools, demonstrations and violence accompanied the beginning of school in the largely white South Boston neighborhood. On the first day, only 124 of the 1,000 students enrolled at South Boston High School attended, and white demonstrators stoned buses carrying African-American students home from the school. Kevin White, Mayor of Boston, banned gatherings of three or more people in the vicinity of public schools.
- American serial murderer Calvin Jackson, who would confess to nine murders committed on the West Side of Manhattan in New York City, was arrested. Jackson was picked up by police hours after the discovery of the body of 69-year-old widow Pauline Spanierman at her apartment at 40 West 77th Street. The NYPD had not previously connected the women's deaths, nor even realized that some of the victims had been murdered.
- Japanese construction worker Etsuo Ono was arrested as the chief suspect in the murders of nine women in and around Tokyo over the previous 20 months. Although he was convicted of murder in 1986 and sentenced to life imprisonment, based on a confession made under duress, Ono's conviction was reversed and he would be acquitted on retrial in 1991. He would later be arrested for the murder of another person in 1996.
- The country music and comedy show Funny Farm, hosted by singer Blake Emmons, premiered on the CTV Television Network as a Canadian-produced program "advertised as a slick rural comedy, a cross between Hee Haw and Laugh-In". The show was poorly received by critics, with one commenting, "in all my years of TV viewing I can't remember a worse show than Funny Farm. It's ugly and crude from every point of view; the concept is a straight steal from Hee Haw, but the writing, performances and production are straight out of the garbage dump."
- Born: Rayya Makarim, U.S.-born Indonesian actress, film screenwriter and producer; in Boston
- Died:
  - Bert R. J. Hassell, 80, American aviation pioneer known for his 1928 establishment, with Parker D. Cramer, of the use of the Great Circle Route over the Atlantic Ocean for the minimum distance between two points on a globe, the route most commercial airliners would later employ.
  - Ernest Cadman Colwell, 73, American biblical scholar known for "Colwell's Rule" concerning translation of texts, died of leukemia.
  - Miriam Young, 61, American writer known for Mother Wore Tights, a vaudeville memoir, died of cancer.
  - Robert M. Danford, 95, United States Army major general
  - Prince Nikita Alexandrovich of Russia, 74

== September 13, 1974 (Friday) ==
- A bomb exploded at the Cafetería Rolando, a restaurant adjacent to the national police headquarters in Madrid, killing 13 people and injuring 71 others.
- Three members of the Japanese Red Army (JRA) seized the French Embassy in The Hague, Netherlands, and took 11 people hostage, including Jacques Senard, the French Ambassador to the Netherlands. The JRA terrorists released their hostages after five days, in return for the release of jailed JRA member Yutaka Furuya and safe passage out of the Netherlands.
- Stuart Blanch, the Bishop of Liverpool, was appointed Archbishop of York, the second highest position in the Church of England.
- Several notable series premiered on American prime-time television. The CBS network debuted the Planet of the Apes TV series, based on the 1968 film of the same name and its sequels. ABC debuted the adventure series Kodiak, the sitcom The Texas Wheelers and the supernatural drama Kolchak: The Night Stalker, featuring a character who had appeared in two earlier TV movies. NBC debuted the sitcom Chico and the Man, the detective drama The Rockford Files and the police procedural Police Woman, a spin-off of an episode of the anthology Police Story.
- Sofim (Società franco-italiana di motori) was created in Italy as a joint venture of the Fiat, Renault and Alfa Romeo companies to manufacture diesel engines.
- Chicago Today, an afternoon tabloid newspaper owned and operated by the Chicago Tribune, published its final issue. The paper had started on July 4, 1900, as the Chicago American, was bought by the Tribune in 1956 and converted to Today in 1969.
- Died:
  - Mary Broadfoot Walker, 86, Scottish physician known for her discovery of treatment of myasthenia gravis with physostigmine
  - Sir John Montague Brocklebank, 5th Baronet, 59, English cricketer and businessman, former chairman of Cunard Steamship Company
  - Jack Pfefer, 79, Polish-born American promoter of professional wrestling, later inducted into the Professional Wrestling Hall of Fame and Museum
  - Minoru Takano, 73, Japanese trade union leader and former Secretary-General of the General Council of Trade Unions of Japan
  - Walter Greenwood, 70, English novelist known for the 1933 book Love on the Dole, about working-class poverty in Northern England.
  - Albert Loening, 88, American aviation pioneer, developer of the first successful amphibian airplane.

== September 14, 1974 (Saturday) ==
- A flash flood killed 10 people when it destroyed the Nelson's Landing Marina in Nelson, Nevada, in the U.S. as it swept through the El Dorado Canyon on Lake Mohave.
- The São Paulo Metro, the first underground subway in Brazil, began operations.
- American astronomer Charles T. Kowal discovered Leda, the 13th moon of Jupiter to be found up to that time, using the 48-inch (1,200 mm) Schmidt telescope at Palomar Observatory.
- Lieutenant General Kim Jae-gyu, who would become the Director of the Korea Central Intelligence Agency (KCIA), was welcomed by South Korea's President Park Chung Hee upon becoming the new Minister of Construction. Kim would tell his lawyer in 1979 that he had been prepared to shoot and kill Park upon shaking hands with the president but abandoned the plan. After becoming the KCIA Director, Kim would assassinate Park Chung Hee five years later on October 26, 1979.

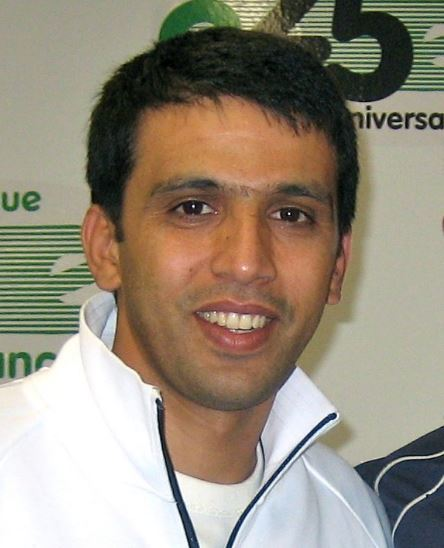
El Guerrouj

- Born: Hicham El Guerrouj, Moroccan middle-distance runner and holder of the world records for the fastest mile run (3 minutes, 43.13 seconds) since 1999, and the 1500 metres run (3 minutes, 26.00 seconds) since 1998; in Berkane. In addition to the mile record that has stood for almost 25 years, El Guerrouj won Olympic gold medals in 2004 for the 1500 metre and 5000 metre races, and three consecutive world championships in the 1500 m race (1999, 2001 and 2003).

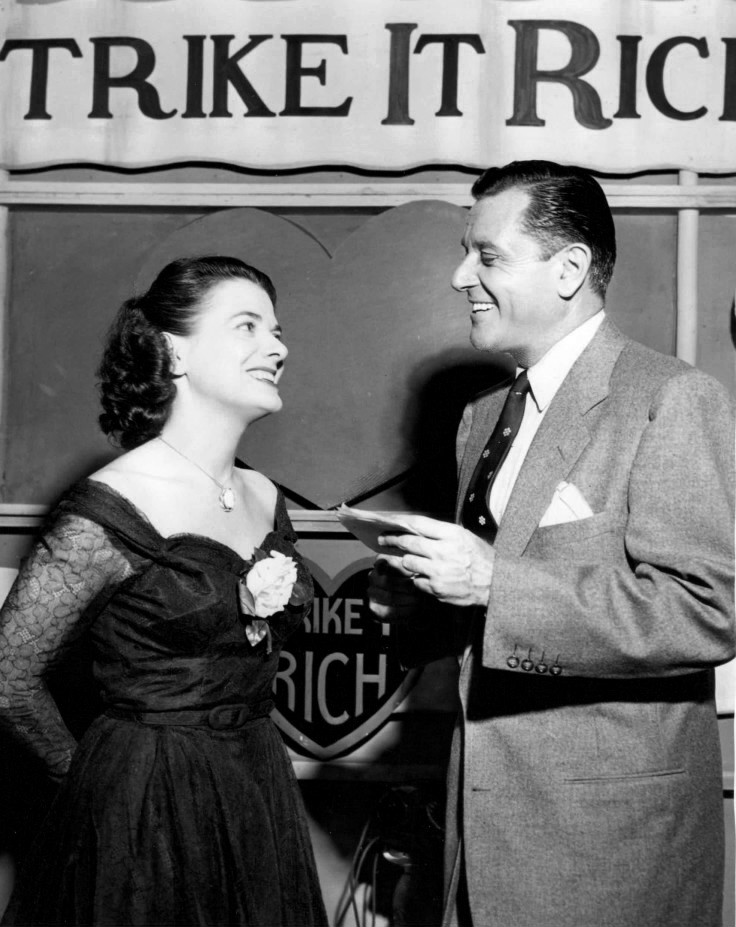
Hull on Strike It Rich

- Died:
  - Warren Hull, 71, American film actor and radio and TV host known for his performances in movie serials as "The Spider" (in 1938 and 1941), "Mandrake the Magician" (1938), and the "Green Hornet" (1940), died of congestive heart failure. Hull, a popular singer, also hosted The Warren Hull Show on CBS Radio and the game show Strike It Rich on radio and TV.
  - Barbara Jo Allen (stage name for Marian Barbara Henshall), 68, American actress and comedienne known for the character "Vera Vague"
  - Agostino Novella, 68, Italian communist who led the Italian General Confederation of Labour and served for 26 years in Italy's Chamber of Deputies

== September 15, 1974 (Sunday) ==
- All 75 people aboard Air Vietnam Flight 706 were killed when three hijackers detonated grenades as the Boeing 727 was attempting an emergency landing at Phan Rang Air Base in South Vietnam. The terrorists had seized the jet after it had taken off from Da Nang on a flight to Saigon, and demanded to be flown to Hanoi in North Vietnam.
- What would become known as the "Bulldozer Exhibition" took place in Moscow when Soviet authorities used bulldozers and water trucks to beak up an unauthorized exhibition of contemporary nonconformist art in a park at Profsoyuznaya Street. After the area was cleared, groups of young men destroyed paintings and threw them into a dump truck to be driven away as police watched. Viewers at the exhibit, including foreign diplomats and journalists attending the exhibit, were assaulted or forced to flee.
- Lieutenant General Aman Andom was named as the Chairman of the Provisional Military Government of Socialist Ethiopia (more commonly called "the Derg") three days after the overthrow of the government of Emperor Haile Selassie, becoming the northeast African nation's new head of state. Aman, of Eritrean descent, would come into conflict with the rest of the Derg for his attempts to resolve the ongoing war of Eritrean independence and would be killed three weeks later.

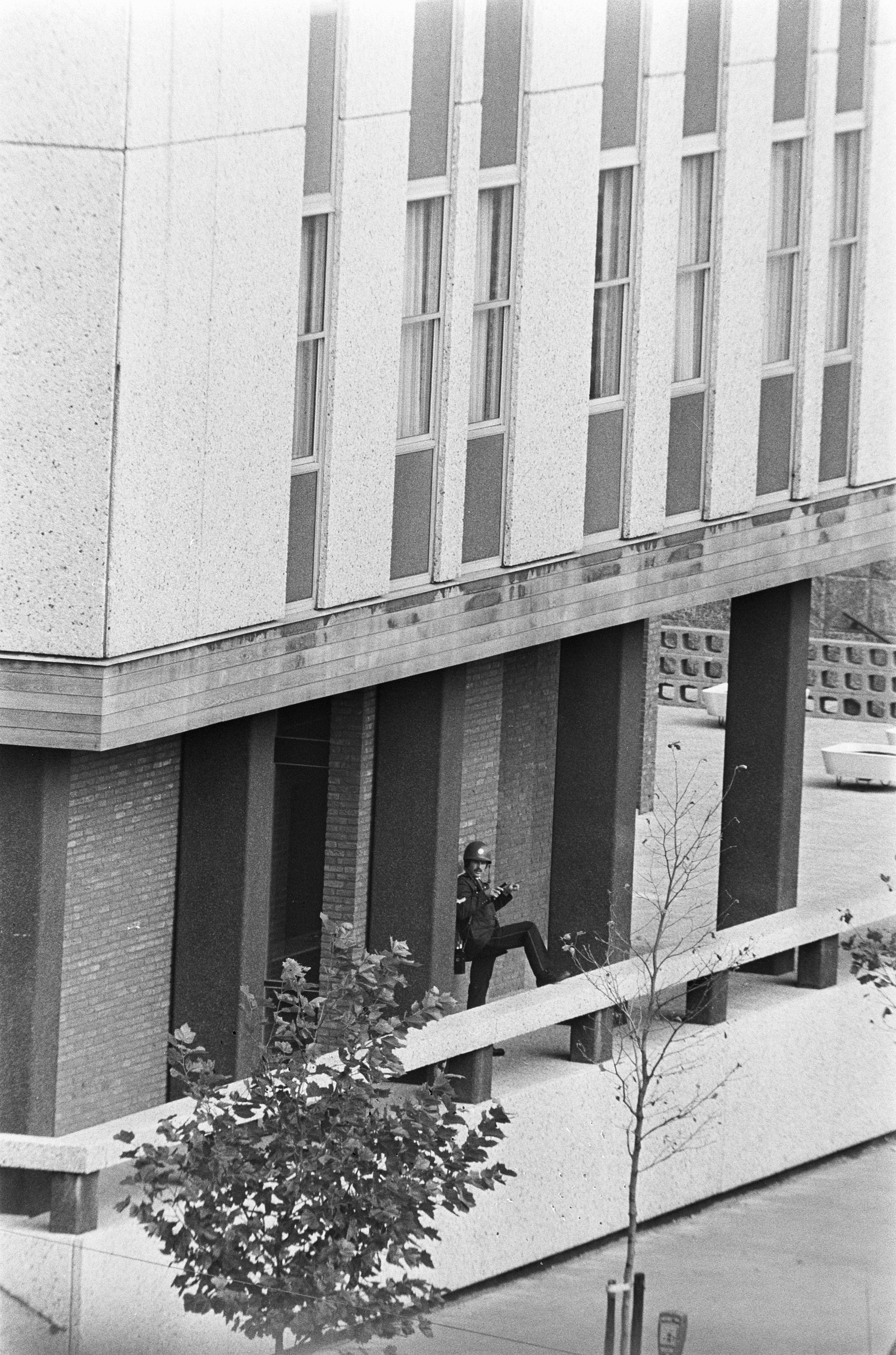
Policeman standing outside French Embassy in The Hague

- A young man threw a hand grenade from a balcony onto a lower sales floor of the Le Publicis Drugstore in Saint-Germain-des-Prés, Paris. The explosion killed two people and injured 34 others. The store's owner, Marcel Bleustein-Blanchet, was well-known as a supporter of Israel. In 2017, evidence would link the terrorist "Carlos the Jackal" to the attack.
- Suzanne Miller, a 26-year-old mother of three, disappeared after leaving her home near Wolseley Barracks in London, Ontario, Canada. Her car would be found on September 23, and her body was discovered on October 12 in a wooded area in Thorndale, Ontario. As of 2018 Miller's murder would remain unsolved.
- Performer Liza Minnelli (whose mother was Judy Garland, Dorothy in The Wizard of Oz) and director and producer Jack Haley Jr. (whose father was Jack Haley, the Tin Man in the same film) married in Montecito, California. Minnelli and Haley would divorce in 1979.
- Born: Elisabeth Dermot Walsh, English TV actress known for the BBC soap opera Doctors; in Merton, London
- Died: Luis Alberto del Paraná, 48, Paraguayan singer and leader of the musical group Los Paraguayos, died of a stroke in London while the group was touring Europe.

== September 16, 1974 (Monday) ==
- U.S. President Ford signed a presidential proclamation granting conditional amnesty to American draft evaders and military deserters from the Vietnam War era. To be eligible, individuals would need to agree to work for up to 24 months in alternative public service jobs. On his first full day in office (January 21, 1977), Ford's successor, Jimmy Carter, would issue an unconditional pardon to most evaders of the draft, which did not, however, include deserters.
- The first female "Mounties" began training at RCMP Academy, Depot Division, as 32 women entered the Royal Canadian Mounted Police as members of the new RCMP's Troop 17. The first all-female group would graduate on March 3, 1975.
- Martin McBirney QC, 56, and Rory Conaghan, 54, both judges in Northern Ireland, were assassinated in Belfast by terrorists from the Provisional Irish Republican Army. McBirney was Protestant and Conaghan (who was killed in front of his 8-year-old daughter) was Catholic.
- On the 19th anniversary of the beginning of the Revolución Libertadora, multiple terrorist acts took place in Argentina, including over 50 bombings, and four people were killed. Hipólito Atilio López, 45, a labor union leader and the former Vice-Governor of the Province of Córdoba, was one of two men forced out of a car 36 miles (58 km) from Buenos Aires and shot to death.
- The Transbay Tube (officially the "Bay Area Underwater Rapid Transit Tube"), the first tunnel underneath the San Francisco Bay in California, opened to the public for passengers traveling between San Francisco and Oakland on the Bay Area Rapid Transit (BART) railway system.
- During a televised press conference, U.S. President Ford acknowledged that the Central Intelligence Agency had been active in Chile during the presidency of Salvador Allende, working to preserve the existence of opposition media and political parties, but denied CIA involvement in the September 1973 coup d'état during which Allende died.
- Born: Loona (stage name for Marie-José van der Kolk), multilingual Dutch pop singer; in IJmuiden
- Died: Forrest "Phog" Allen, 88, American college basketball coach at the University of Kansas, inductee into the Basketball Hall of Fame, 1952 NCAA tournament champion, known for his winning percentage of almost 74% of games coached.

== September 17, 1974 (Tuesday) ==
- The United Nations admitted Bangladesh, Guinea-Bissau, and Grenada as its newest members.
- The American yacht Courageous, skippered by Ted Hood, won the 1974 America's Cup at Newport, Rhode Island.

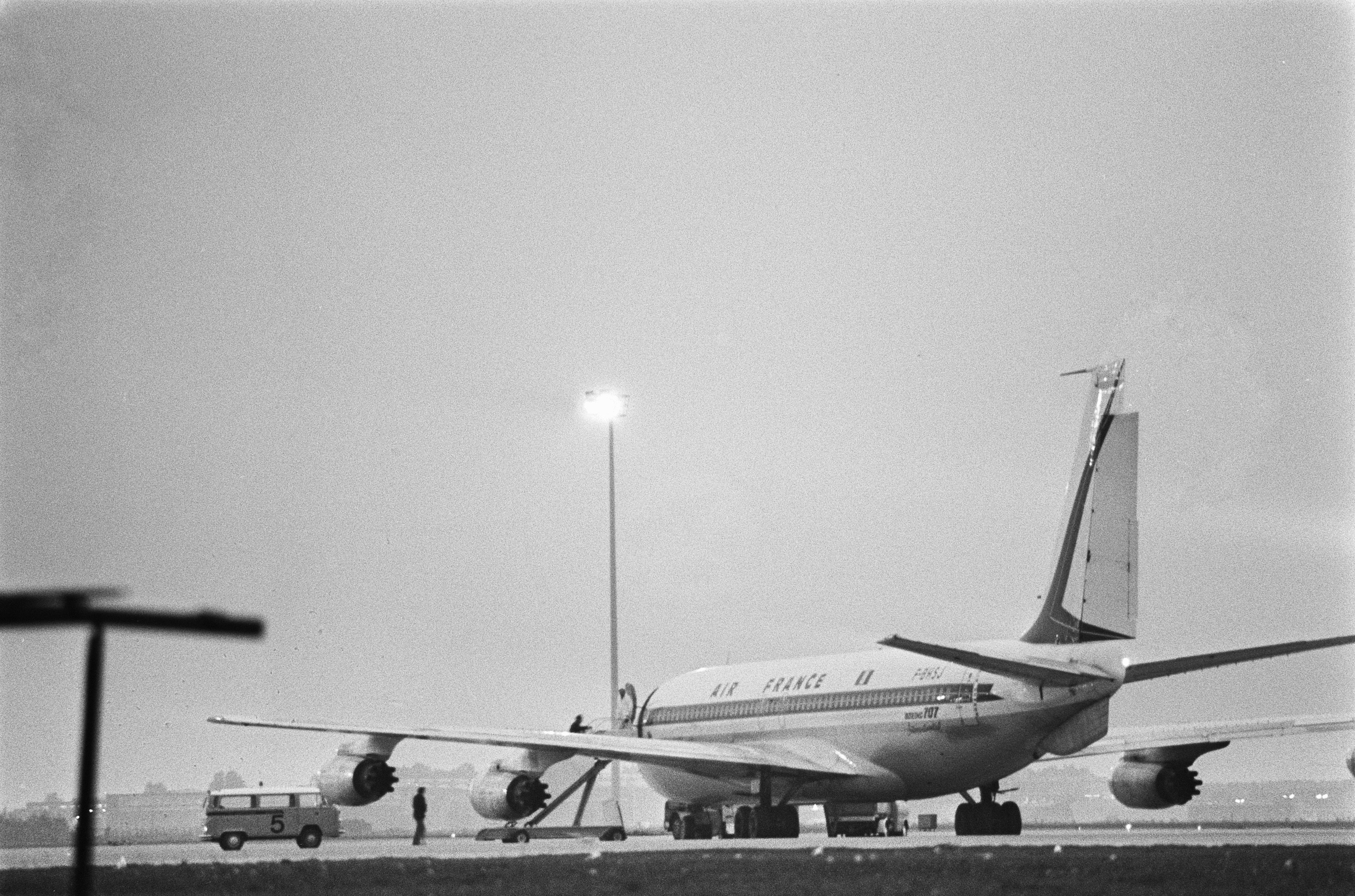
Boeing 707 carrying terrorists takes off from Amsterdam Airport Schiphol

- The three Japanese terrorists who had taken over the French Embassy in The Hague released their 9 remaining hostages and left Amsterdam by jetliner for Damascus, Syria, taking with them Japanese Red Army member Yutaka Furuya, whose release from a Parisian prison they had demanded. Earlier in the day, Queen Juliana was driven in a blue compact car to the parliament building (Ridderzaal) only 300 yards (270 m) from the French Embassy to give the Prinsjesdag, the Dutch speech from the throne, rather than riding in the Golden Coach as was traditional.
- Born:
  - Masamori Tokuyama (ring name for Chang-soo Hong), Japanese-born North Korean boxer who held the WBC super-flyweight title twice between 2000 and 2006, who later obtained South Korean citizenship; in Tokyo
  - Mette Solli, Norwegian women's kickboxer, 2001 and 2007 world champion; in Molde
  - Rasheed Wallace, American basketball player recognized as Mr. Basketball USA, the boys' high school basketball player of 1993, and who later spent 16 seasons in the NBA; in Philadelphia
  - Mirah (Mirah Yom Tov Zeitlyn), American musician and songwriter; in Philadelphia
- Died:
  - Claudia Morgan, 63, American radio and stage actress, star from 1941 to 1950 of The Adventures of the Thin Man as Nora Charles
  - André Dunoyer de Segonzac, 90, French painter and graphic artist, died of bronchitis.

== September 18, 1974 (Wednesday) ==
- Süleyman Demirel resigned as Prime Minister of Turkey after seven members of his coalition government tried to stop him from making a state visit to the Scandinavian nations. The post would remain empty until November 17, when Sadi Irmak formed a caretaker government that would last until March 31 the following year.
- A Brazilian Air Force transport plane crashed on takeoff at Ponta Porã, killing 22 of the 23 officers on board.
- American actress Doris Day won a $22,835,646 judgment against lawyer Jerome Rosenthal, whom she had accused of defrauding her and her husband, Martin Melcher, who died in 1968. Day would settle with Rosenthal's insurers in August 1977 for $6 million to be paid in 23 annual installments.
- British Prime Minister Harold Wilson announced in a televised speech that new elections for the House of Commons would be held on October 10, marking the first time in 50 years that two general elections had been held in the same year.
- Four men from Maitland, Florida, ranging in age from 20 to 24, drowned while cave diving at the off-limits Little River Springs near Branford. The executive director of the National Association for Cave Diving told a reporter, "They were totally unprepared for their 1,000 foot dive with equipment nowhere near adequate and only one of them had any cave diving experience at all. It was a suicide except that they didn't know it."
- Born:
  - Sulzer "Sol" Campbell, English footballer with 73 caps for the England national team; in Plaistow, Newham, London
  - Xzibit (stage name of Alvin Nathaniel Joiner), American rapper; in Detroit, Michigan
- Died:
  - Edna Best, 74, British stage and film actress known for The Man Who Knew Too Much, Intermezzo and Swiss Family Robinson
  - Ray Richards, 68, American football player known for the later-outlawed play "the lift", briefly coach of the NFL Chicago Cardinals, died of cancer.
  - Amanat Ali Khan, 52, Pakistani vocalist, died of a ruptured appendix.
  - Brice Taylor, 72, African-American college football player, 1925 All-American, known for lacking a left hand. Taylor was the first black player for the USC Trojans, and later a head football coach for several historically black colleges.

== September 19, 1974 (Thursday) ==
- In Argentina, the kidnapping of brothers Jorge Born and Juan Born, which would be resolved only after the payment of a record ransom, was carried out in Buenos Aires by the Montoneros terrorist group. The two brothers, officers of the Bunge & Born grain exporting company, were being driven to their offices, along with general manager Alberto Bosch, when their limousine was blocked by 15 terrorists in several cars. Bosch and the chauffeur, Juan Carlos Perez, were shot and killed. Juan would be released in April, but Jorge would remain captive until June 20, 1975, released only after the payment of $64,000,000 U.S. dollars.
- Yuri Andropov, the Director of the Soviet Union's KGB spy agency, approved "Plan 5/9-16091", a disinformation campaign to discredit recently-expelled dissident Aleksandr Solzhenitsyn and to deter his contacts with other Soviet dissidents. The harassment led to Solzhenitsyn leaving Zürich in Switzerland, where he and all persons contacting him had been under Soviet surveillance, and settling in the small U.S. town of Cavendish, Vermont.
- Born:
  - Jimmy Fallon, American actor, comedian, and television personality; in Bay Ridge, Brooklyn, New York City
  - Hidetaka Miyazaki, Japanese video game designer and executive
  - Victoria Silvstedt, Swedish model; in Skelleftehamn
- Died:
  - Leonard Raffensperger, 70, American football and basketball player and coach, died of cancer.
  - Zack Taylor, 76, American Major League Baseball catcher and manager, died of a heart attack.
  - Harry Austryn Wolfson, 86, Russian Empire-born American scholar, philosopher and historian at Harvard University

== September 20, 1974 (Friday) ==
- Hurricane Fifi struck the Central American nation of Honduras, where it killed more than 8,000 people. On the first day, the town of Choloma was destroyed and more than 2,800 people washed away when the flood collapsed a natural dam.

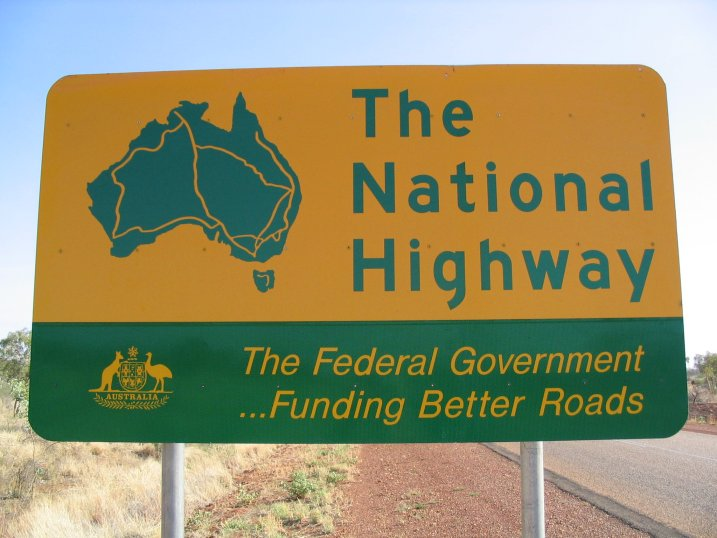
Sign for The National Highway in Australia

- The National Highway, Australia's network of federally-funded roads, came into existence with the approval of the National Roads Act 1974.
- Queen Elizabeth II of the United Kingdom ordered the dissolution of Parliament slightly more than six months after it opened on March 12, making the 46th Parliament of Elizabeth II the shortest elected UK parliament in history.
- The war crimes trial of Bruno Streckenbach, director of Nazi Germany's Einsatzgruppen within Poland, on charges of one million counts of murder, was postponed indefinitely because of his cardiac problems. Streckenbach would survive for three more years, never facing a verdict, until his death on October 28, 1977.
- The Kootenai Tribe of Idaho, under the leadership of tribal elder Amelia Trice, announced a declaration of war against the U.S. government. The Tribe set up informational pickets and requested 10-cent tolls on U.S. Highway 95 in Bonners Ferry, Idaho. Trice would lead a delegation to Washington, D.C., for talks, resulting in U.S. President Ford signing a bill transferring two tracts of federal land to the tribe.
- Died:

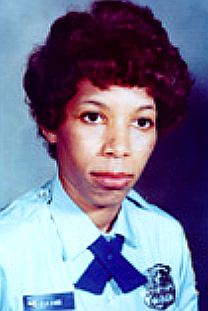
Gail Cobb

  - Officer Gail Cobb, 24, of the Metropolitan Police Department of the District of Columbia, was shot and killed by a bank robbery suspect whom she was attempting to arrest, becoming the first female African-American police officer to be killed in the line of duty. Over 900 people attended her funeral on September 24 at the Holy Comforter Catholic Church in Southeast Washington, D.C., including FBI Director Clarence M. Kelley and Walter Washington, Mayor-Commissioner of the District of Columbia, with 2,000 more mourners on the street outside.
  - Olle Hedberg, 75, Swedish author, committed suicide.
  - José Mojica, 79, Mexican Franciscan friar and former tenor and actor, died of a heart attack.

== September 21, 1974 (Saturday) ==
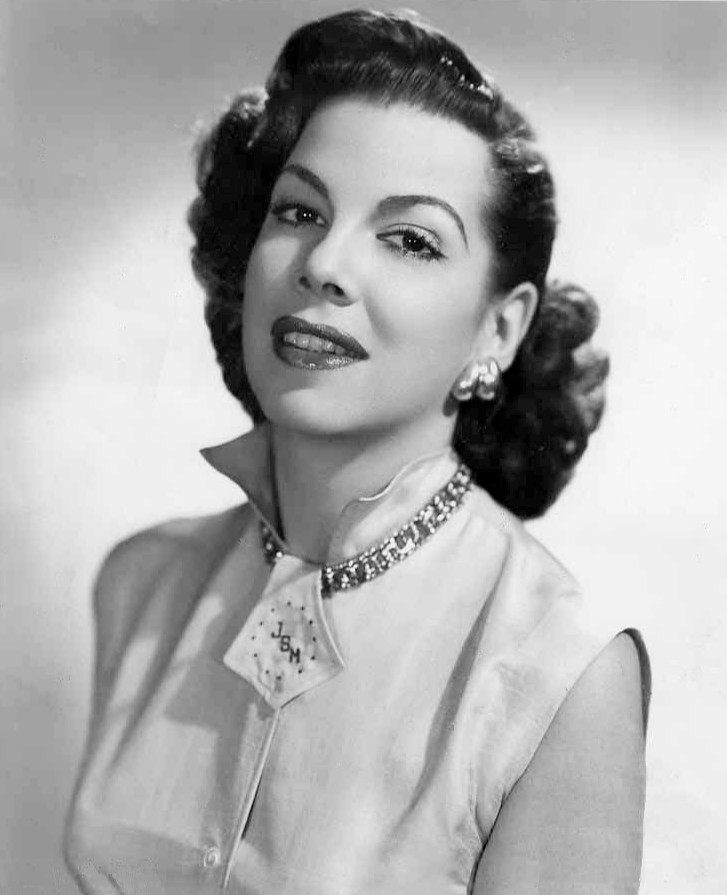
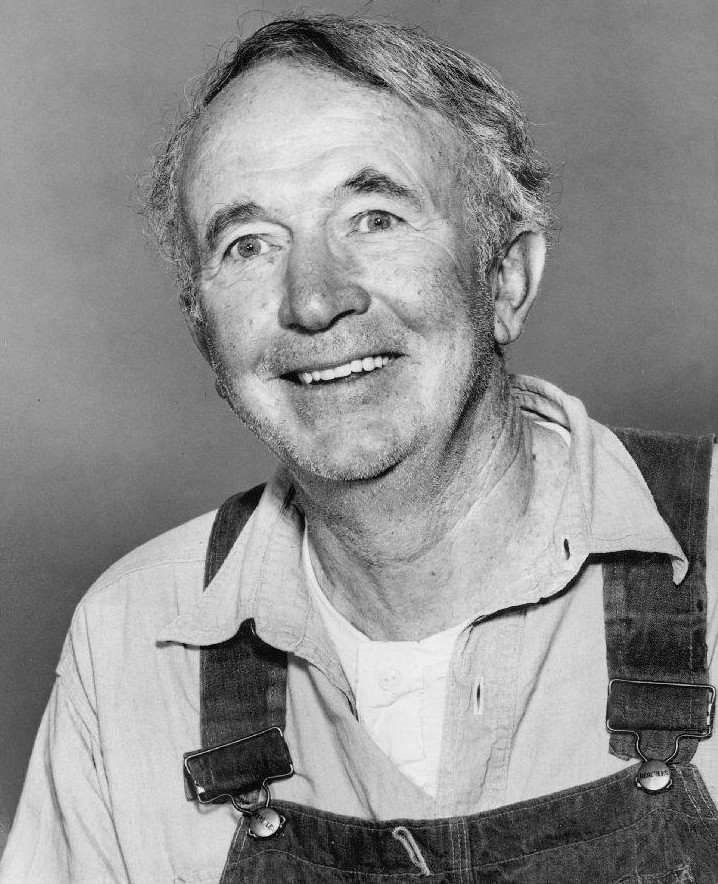
Bestselling novelist Susann and renowned actor Brennan
- At Clarkson College of Technology in Potsdam, New York, 59-year-old John W. Graham Jr., Clarkson's chancellor, collapsed from a heart attack after his speech at the inauguration of Robert A. Plane as Clarkson's president. 64-year-old Dr. Hans Levi gave Graham mouth-to-mouth resuscitation, but himself collapsed from a heart attack half an hour later. Both Graham and Levi died at Potsdam Hospital.
- About 3,000 people were evacuated in Houston, Texas, and 19 people were hospitalized, for injuries that happened within a 5-mile (8.0 km) radius of an explosion and leak of the gas butadiene in a Houston railyard.
- The U.S. planetary probe Mariner 10, which had made a flyby of the planet Mercury on March 29, was able to make a second, but more distant, pass for data collection because of Mercury's frequent orbit (every 88 days) around the Sun.
- Died:
  - Jacqueline Susann, 56, American writer known for the bestselling novels Valley of the Dolls (1966), The Love Machine (1969), and Once Is Not Enough (1973), died of lung cancer, 19 months after being diagnosed. After her death, her final novel, Dolores, was the third highest selling novel in the U.S. for 1976.
  - Walter Brennan, 80, American film and television actor and star of the TV show The Real McCoys, winner of three Academy Awards for Best Supporting Actor (including the first ever supporting actor award, for Come and Get It), died of emphysema.
  - Allen J. Greenough, 69, American businessman who was the last president of the Pennsylvania Railroad (1959 to 1968), died of cancer.
  - Paul Robinson, 76, American comic strip artist who had created Etta Kett in 1925

== September 22, 1974 (Sunday) ==
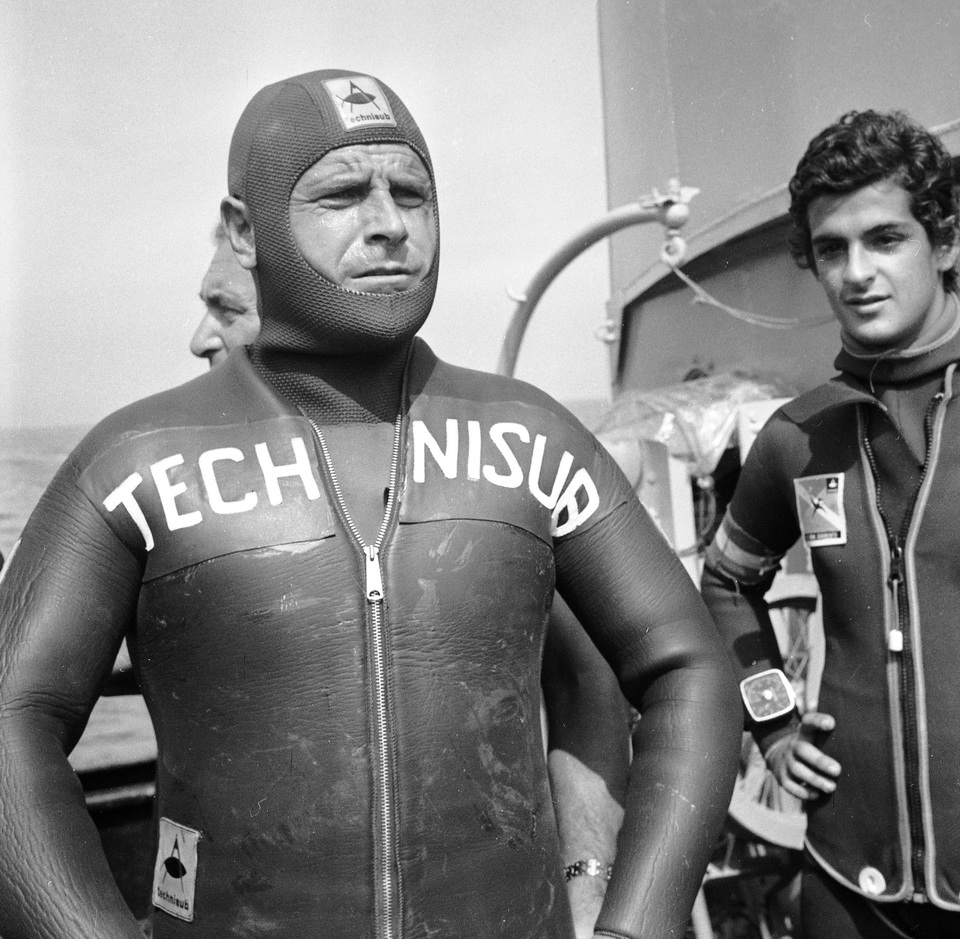
September 21, 1974: Maiorca preparing for world record attempt

- In the Gulf of Salerno, Italian freediver Enzo Maiorca attempted to set a new world depth record of 90 metres (300 ft) on live television. Less than 20 metres (66 ft) down, Maiorca collided with Enzo Bottesini, a diving expert and RAI correspondent. Maiorca surfaced and let out a stream of profanities that were audible to the television audience. He did not appear on television again until 2000.
- Brazilian driver Emerson Fittipaldi won the 1974 Canadian Grand Prix at Mosport Park in Ontario, Canada. Cale Yarborough won the Wilkes 400, a NASCAR Winston Cup Series race, at the North Wilkesboro Speedway in North Carolina.
- Died:
  - Jessica Daves, 76, American writer and editor, former editor-in-chief of Vogue magazine, died of cancer.
  - Winfried Otto Schumann, 86, German physicist

== September 23, 1974 (Monday) ==
- In the UK, the BBC became the first television network to feature texting for viewers as it inaugurated Ceefax. The service offered as many as 30 pages of information for subscribers to view while watching BBC programmes. Ceefax, a pun on the phrase "see facts", would continue until October 23, 2012.
- American reporters and members of the U.S. Congress were given a rare tour of the vaults of the United States Bullion Depository at Fort Knox, Kentucky. The U.S. Department of the Treasury allowed the viewing, the first since 1943 and the last one in the 20th century, in order to dispel a conspiracy theory that the gold reserves had been emptied. The only tour since 1974 took place on August 21, 2017.
- U.S. Senator Ted Kennedy announced that he would not be a candidate for President or Vice President in the 1976 United States presidential election.
- In Portugal, a late-night fire at Lisbon's Palace of Ajuda began, causing extensive damage and destroying 500 paintings, including a Rembrandt self-portrait.
- Born:
  - Cyril Hanouna, French radio and television presenter known for hosting Touche pas à mon poste ! (""Don't Touch My TV Set!"); in Paris
  - Matt Hardy, American professional wrestler, 14-time world tag team champion; in Cameron, North Carolina
  - Misuzulu Zulu, King of the Zulu Nation in South Africa since 2021; in Hlabisa, KwaZulu, South Africa
- Died:
  - Cliff Arquette, 68, American comedian who created the character "Charley Weaver", died of a heart attack.
  - Denis Ireland, 80, Northern Irish Protestant political activist and the first member of the Republic of Ireland's parliament (as a member of the Seanad Éireann to be a resident of Northern Ireland
  - Jayachamarajendra Wadiyar, 55, member of Indian nobility and the last Maharaja of Mysore, later appointed as Governor of Mysore state and of Madras state, died of bronchial pneumonia.
  - Robbie McIntosh, 24, Scottish drummer and founding member of the Average White Band rock group, died of an accidental heroin overdose.
  - Kiyoteru Hanada, 65, Japanese essayist and influential literary critic
  - Gerhard Nebel, 70, German writer and cultural critic

== September 24, 1974 (Tuesday) ==
- The Palimbang massacre, a mass murder of more than 1,000 Muslim Moros by units of the Armed Forces of the Philippines, was carried out in the coastal village of Malisbong in Palimbang, Sultan Kudarat, on the island of Mindanao. As many as 1,500 male Moros, rangng in age from 11 to 70, were murdered inside a mosque, and females between the ages of 9 and 60 were raped. The village of Malisbong was completely destroyed.
- At least 100 people in Japan were injured in a collision between an express train and a derailed freight train 40 miles (64 km) north of Tokyo.
- Born: Kati Wolf, Hungarian singer; in Szentendre

== September 25, 1974 (Wednesday) ==
- The first modern triathlon, an endurance multisport race, took place in the U.S. at Mission Bay in San Diego, California. The three-event race was organized by two members of the San Diego Track Club, Jack Johnstone and Don Shanahan. In order, 46 participants began by running 3 miles (4.8 km); bicycling twice around a course on Fiesta Island for 5 miles (8.0 km); and swimming from the island to the mainland.
- American orthopedic surgeon Frank Jobe, a physician for the Los Angeles Dodgers baseball team, performed the first ulnar collateral ligament reconstruction, now commonplace for athletes, with a tendon from one arm being used to reconstruct the elbow of the other arm. Jobe's first patient was Dodgers pitcher Tommy John, who tore a ligament in his left elbow on July 17 in his 12th season in baseball. After staying out during the 1975 season to recover, John would continue as a pitcher for 14 additional seasons and would be the inspiration for other players to extend their careers by undergoing the "Tommy John surgery".
- The government of Pakistan, led by Zulfiqar Ali Bhutto, dissolved the princely states of Hunza (led by the Mir Jamal) and Nagar (led by Mir Shaukat Ali Khan).
- Deutsche Krebshilfe (the German Cancer Aid Foundation), the leading European cancer treatment organization, was founded by Mildred Scheel, the wife of incumbent West German President Walter Scheel.
- The U.S. Army reconnaissance drone "Tom Cat", a Ryan Model 147 Lightning Bug vehicle that had been used for 67 missions since 1967, was shot down over Hanoi in North Vietnam while on its 68th flight.
- Died:
  - Nicolai Poliakoff OBE, 73, Latvian-born British circus performer known worldwide for his performances as Coco the Clown
  - John McCarten, 63, American film and Broadway theatre critic for The New Yorker, died of cancer.

== September 26, 1974 (Thursday) ==
- The first warnings were made to the general public of the danger of ozone depletion from the use of chlorofluorocarbons (CFCs), as The New York Times ran a front-page story headlined "Tests Show Aerosol Gases May Pose Threat to Earth". The Times noted that Michael B. McElroy, professor of atmospheric science, and Dr. Steven C. Wofsy, an atmospheric physicist, had concluded that if the use of the refrigerant Freon continued, the ozone in the atmosphere, the primary protector against ultraviolet radiation, would be decreased by 30% within 20 years. McElroy and Wofsy publicized the danger of ozone depletion, following up on the findings of its cause by F. Sherwood Rowland and Mario Molina, published on June 28, 1974, "to little fanfare".
- U.S. First Lady Betty Ford, the 56-year-old wife of President Gerald Ford, was first discovered to have a lump that would prove to be cancerous, when she chose "on the spur of the moment" to undergo an examination at the Bethesda Naval Hospital. The appointment at Bethesda had been for the First Lady's personal assistant, Nancy Howe, and Mrs. Ford had gone along as a friend. Dr. Douglas Knab detected the lump in the examination, confirmed by surgeon William Fouty. The two physicians then contacted the White House physician, Dr. William M. Lukash, who arranged for Dr. Richard Thistlewaite to conduct tests the next day at Bethesda, leading to surgery for breast cancer on September 28.
- All television stations and networks in Argentina were placed under direct control of the Argentine government by Decree 919/1974.
- Georgios Papadopoulos, the former president of Greece, was placed under house arrest at his villa outside Athens due to reports that he might try to reenter politics.
- U.S. Secretary of Agriculture Earl Butz abandoned a proposal for a tent show that would have toured the United States with prayer, music and sketches of pioneer life to demonstrate that food was a better bargain in the U.S. than in any other country and to strengthen the credibility of the Department of Agriculture. Democratic Party politicians had ridiculed the idea, with U.S. Senator George McGovern calling it "almost incomprehensible."
- Born: Joo Jin-mo (stage name for Park Jin-tae), South Korean film and TV actor, winner of the Grand Bell Award for Best Supporting Actor for the 1999 film Happy End; in Seoul
- Died: Harry Hartz, 77, American auto mechanic and racing driver who finished in second place in the Indianapolis 500 three times, later inducted into the Auto Racing Hall of Fame

== September 27, 1974 (Friday) ==
- East Germany (officially, the German Democratic Republic) revised its Constitution to omit mention of the concept of German reunification. The changes, which also described the Communist German state as "a socialist state of workers and farmers... under the leadership of the working class and their Marxist-Leninist party," were made to further the new policy of Abgrenzung to designate East Germany as a separate nation.
- Rites of Passage, a music theatre work written by Australian composer Peter Sculthorpe, was given its first performance, making its debut at the Sydney Opera House.
- Alí Lameda, a Venezuelan translator who had served as an interpreter for the North Korean Foreign Ministry, was allowed to leave the country after seven years in a North Korean concentration camp. In 1967, Lameda had made the mistake of telling jokes about North Korean leader Kim Il Sung at a banquet for Foreign Ministry employees.
- Born:
  - Lodewijk Asscher, Chairman of the Partij van de Arbeid in the Netherlands, 2016 to 2021, and Deputy Prime Minister from 2012 to 2017; in Amsterdam
  - Trick Daddy (stage name for Maurice Young), American rapper; in Miami
- Died:
  - Louis Even, 89, French-born Canadian lay Roman Catholic leader and publisher, founder of the social credit movement in Quebec
  - James R. Webb, 64, American screenwriter, Academy Award winner for How the West Was Won
  - Silvio Frondizi, 67, Argentine lawyer, brother of former President Arturo Frondizi, was kidnapped from his home and murdered by terrorists from the right-wing Argentine Anticommunist Alliance (Triple A). On September 29, Argentine police used tear gas to disperse 3,000 people at Frondizi's funeral procession.

== September 28, 1974 (Saturday) ==
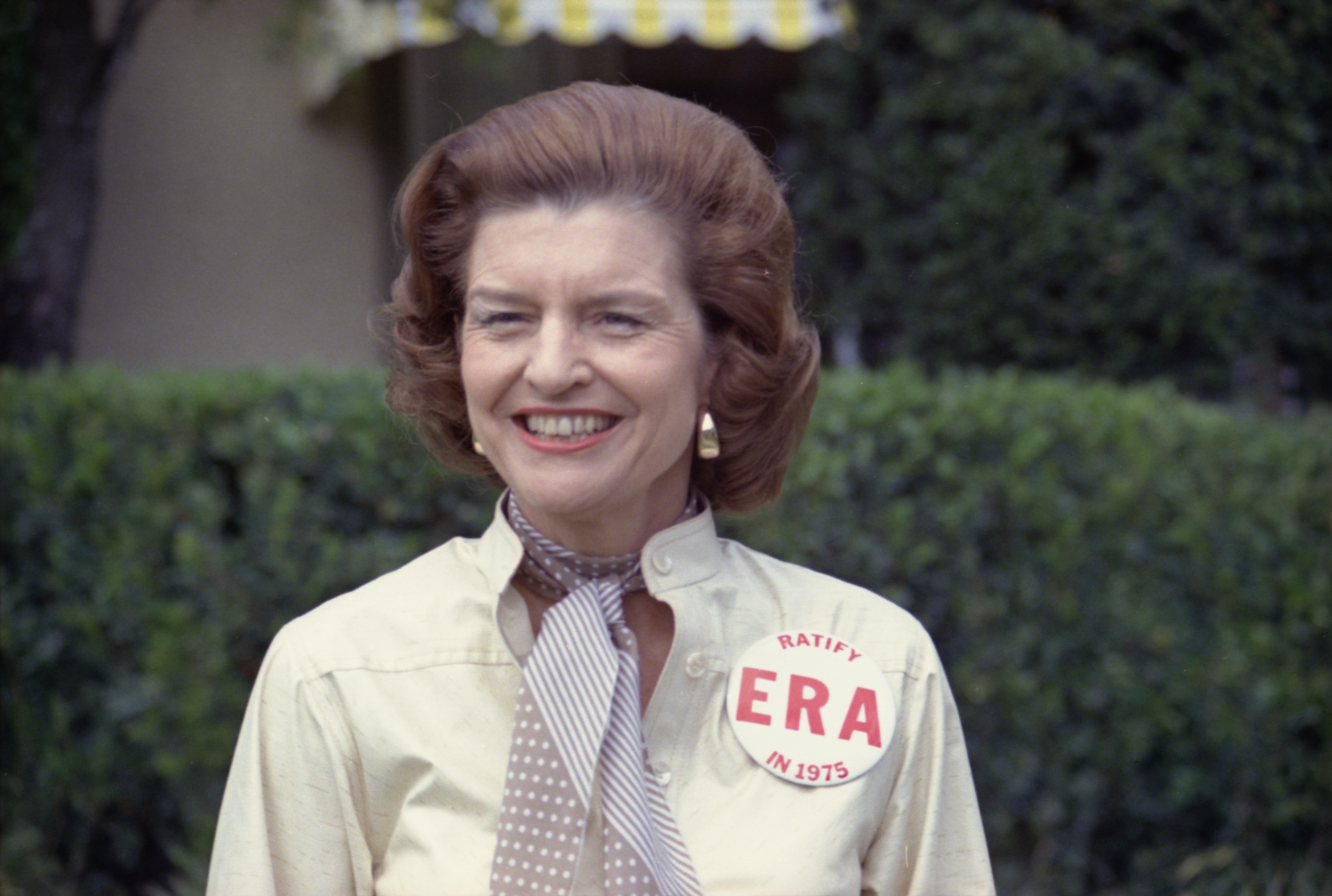
First Lady Betty Ford

- Betty Ford, the First Lady of the United States, underwent a mastectomy at Bethesda Naval Hospital to remove her right breast after the discovery of a cancerous lump. The choice of Mrs. Ford to fully disclose her diagnosis of breast cancer would be described later as "an important decision which would have tremendous social impact". As one historian noted, "After she went public to alert as many women as possible of the benefits of early detection, millions of women schedule appointments at breast cancer clinics across the country." Another historian, Lisa Liebman, would say later, "Her courage and candor not only removed the stigma from the topic but also saved countless lives." Mrs. Ford herself would say later, "I got a lot of credit for having gone public with my mastectomy, but if I hadn't been the wife of the President of the United States, the press would not have come racing after my story, so in a way it was fate."
- The Panamanian freighter Sun Shang sank in a typhoon 400 miles (640 km) east of Hong Kong, killing 31 of its 34 crewmembers. On the east coast of Taiwan, at least 13 people in one village died in a landslide caused by the typhoon.
- A Venezuelan Air Force Phantom jet with two people on board went out of control at an airshow near Caracas and crashed into an apartment building, killing eight residents.
- The Grand Final, the championship game of the Victorian Football League, was played at the Melbourne Cricket Ground before a crowd of 113,839 people. The Richmond Tigers defeated the North Melbourne Kangaroos, 18.20 to 13.9 (128 to 87, based on six-point goals and one-point kicks).
- Born:
  - Geoff Zanelli, American composer of film scores; in Westminster, California
  - Alison Parrott, Canadian murder victim; in Toronto (killed 1986)
- Died:
  - Arnold Fanck, 85, German film director
  - Len Johnson, 71, black British middleweight boxer and former British champion, labour movement activist and prominent member of the Communist Party of Great Britain

== September 29, 1974 (Sunday) ==
- In Moscow, over 30,000 people came to an open-air show of contemporary nonconformist art in Izmaylovsky Park. The display was approved by Soviet authorities after foreign criticism of the September 15 disruption of the exhibition at Bitsa Park. One artist commented to a reporter, "We have had four hours of freedom here this afternoon."
- Americans Norbert Sander and Kathrine Switzer won the men's and women's races of the 1974 New York City Marathon. Sander remains the only native New Yorker to win the New York City Marathon.
- Regular commercial air service began between Japan and the People's Republic of China with a direct flight from Tokyo to Beijing exactly two years after the 1972 establishment of diplomatic relations.
- Earl Ross, a resident of Ontario, became the first (and as of 2024, only) Canadian to win a NASCAR Cup Series race, finishing in first place at the Old Dominion 500 at Martinsville Speedway in Virginia.
- Died:
  - David Meirhofer, 25, American serial killer, hanged himself at the Gallatin County Jail in Bozeman, Montana.
  - Helen Schnabel, 63, American concert pianist, died of cancer.
  - Billie Pierce (born Wilhelmina Madison Goodson), 67, American jazz pianist and singer

== September 30, 1974 (Monday) ==
- Four months after leading the Carnation Revolution that ended the dictatorship in Portugal, President António de Spínola resigned because of his frustration with attempting to control the speed of reforms implemented by the Movimento das Forças Armadas (MFA). Spinola was succeeded by General Francisco da Costa Gomes.
- A little more than a year after fleeing into exile in Argentina, General Carlos Prats, the former Commander-in-chief of the Chilean Army during the administration of the late President Salvador Allende, was assassinated along with his wife, Sofía Cuthbert, in a car bombing in Buenos Aires.
- The popular British television programme Oh No It's Selwyn Froggitt, with Bill Maynard in the title role, premiered on ITV for the first of four series, running until 1978.
- Born: Yul Bürkle, Venezuelan actor and model; in Caracas
- Died:
  - E Boyd (artistic name for Elizabeth Boyd White), 71, American artist, art historian and curator
  - Dermot Morrah, 78, British journalist and royal expert for The Times of London
