= Syed Yahya Shah =

Pakistani politician (1927/1928 – 2021)

Member Gilgit–Baltistan Legislative Assembly
- In office 1975–1980
- Preceded by: Mir Shaukat Ali Khan
- Succeeded by: Mir Shaukat Ali khan

Personal details
- Born: 1927/1928
- Died: 11 April 2021

Syed Yahya Shah سيد يحي (also called Aga Yahya) was a Pakistani politician and scholar from Gilgit-Baltistan.

== Early life ==
Shah was born in Minapin, Nagar District of Gilgit-Baltistan Pakistan. He acquired his early education in Nomal and Gilgit, and attended high school in Astor and Kashmir. He then studied at Edwardes College in Peshawar. On return to Gilgit he taught at High School Gilgit. Syed Yahya Shah died on Sunday 11 April 2021 at 3:45 AM DHQ Hospital Gilgit.

== Political career ==
The people of Nagar elected him to become the first elected Member of Legislative Assembly of Gilgit–Baltistan from Nagar.

He actively played a role in making Hunza–Nagar a District in Gilgit–Baltistan.

== Charity work ==
In addition to his political career, Syed Yahya worked as pioneer nature conservation activist in Gilgit–Baltistan. He was the first person to introduce Trophy Hunting Programme(THP) in Bar Valley in Nagar, which was supported by IUCN, WWF and Government of Pakistan and replicated by other communities and villages of Gilgit–Baltistan. He saved several snow leopards in Nagar when they were caught to kill by villagers.

Syed has also worked on various charity projects to improve his home region. He initiated the connecting a warm spring in Diater Mountains in the Karakoram to Bar Valley in Nagar in collaboration with WWF which not only saved fuel energy but also decreased diseases in women caused by the washing of clothes in cold water during cold weather. As Minapin Community Leader, in Minapin village he motivated Aga Khan Rural Support Programme to initiate a project which restored a deserted mountain called Khaiadar where the canal irrigating to the pastures and agricultural fields at this mountain was cut off from the source of water-glacier by climate changed recession of glacier. He led the community to install a pipeline which reconnected broken water channel after 150 years of desertification. Syed Yahya Shah participated in a historical documentation of customary laws in nature conservation in Gilgit–Baltistan, a project of IUCN and the government of Pakistan.

.

== Publications ==
Reign	Mirs of Nagar
Unknown dates	Fadl Khan
Unknown dates	Daud Khan
Unknown dates	Ali Dad Khan (1st time)
Unknown dates	Hari Tham Khan
Unknown dates	Ali Dad Khan (2nd time)
Unknown dates	Kamal Khan
Unknown dates	Rahim Khan I
Unknown date – 1839	
1839–1891	Jafar Zahid Khan (1st time)
1891–1892	Raja Azur Khan (acting)
1892–1904	Jafar Zahid Khan (2nd time)
1905 – 17 March 1940	Raja Mir Iskandar Khan
17 March 1940 – 25 September 1974	Shaukat Ali Khan (1930–1976)
25 September 1974	State of Nagar dissolved
After Nagar State Dissolved in 1974	Elected Representatives of Nagar in Gilgit–Baltistan legislative council
1975	Syed Yahya Shah
1980	Mir Shaukat Ali Khan
1985–	Qurban Ali
1997–	Mir Shaukat Ali Khan-Nagar-1 Sheikh Ghulam Haider-Nagar-2,
2000	-Qurban Ali-Nagar-1, Sheikh Ghulam Haider-Nagar-2
2005	Mirza Hussain-Nagar-1, Muhammad Ali Akhtar-Nagar-2
2009	Mirza Hussain-Nagar-1 Muhammad Ali Akhtar-Nagar-2
