= Death of Milica Kostić =

1974 death in Serbia

Milica Kostić
- Kostić in 1974
- Born: 24 April 1956; Strojinci, Serbia, Yugoslavia
- Died: 4 September 1974 (aged 18); Kruševac, Serbia, Yugoslavia
- Cause of death: Suicide by jumping
- Resting place: Strojinci
- Education: Kruševac Medical High School
- Occupation: High school student

Milica Kostić (Serbian Cyrillic: Милица Костић; 24 April 1956 – 4 September 1974) was a high school student from Serbia (then part of Yugoslavia) who at age 18 died by suicide to avoid being raped. She was lured to a 12th floor apartment in Kruševac by a group of young men who then tried to rape her. To avoid being assaulted, she jumped from the window of the apartment and fell onto the street. She died from her injuries two days later but gave the police a full description of the incident before her death.

This event sparked outrage across Yugoslavia and demonstrations against perpetrators were held in Kruševac. Media outlets gave large publicity to the case and the public was unanimous in condemnation. Most commentators praised Kostić's bravery and heroic death. Four perpetrators (one of whom was a minor) were sentenced to prison. It is not known for certain how much time each of them spent in prison. It was reported that one of them, Tomislav Ž. Nikolić, was released after 9½ years.

== Early life ==
Milica Kostić was born on 24 April 1956 in Strojinci near Brus, Serbia (then part of SFR Yugoslavia) as the fourth child in the family of Milen and Slavka Kostić. After finishing elementary school, she enrolled in the Medical High School in Kruševac in 1971. While attending the high school, she was living in Kruševac with a roommate.

== Suicide ==
On Monday, 2 September 1974 (the first day of school), Kostić left her village and arrived in Kruševac around 7:15 AM. Since it was too early for school, she decided to take a walk.

A group of five men (Miroslav Madžarac, Tomislav Ž. Nikolić, Zvonko Ivanović, Slavoljub Trifunović, and a minor, S.V.) assembled that day and decided to lure a girl into an apartment and rape her. On the Main street, they saw Kostić walking and decided to approach her. Nikolić then approached her and asked her for help. He told Kostić that he wanted to call his girlfriend to come out from her apartment with him, but that her parents were very rigid and would not let her go with him. So, he asked Kostić if she would come with him to his girlfriend's apartment pretending to be his girlfriend's colleague and ask her parents if she could come out. This was just a ruse to lure her to the apartment.

Nikolić took the girl to the apartment belonging to S.V. on the 12th floor of the nearby "Rubin" building. Other perpetrators waited nearby, and when they saw Nikolić coming with a girl, they rushed to the apartment before the two came in. One of the perpetrators disabled the doorbell and turned on loud music so that the neighbors would not hear anything. When Nikolić and Kostić appeared at the door, one of the perpetrators opened the door and let her in. As soon as she stepped into the apartment, Nikolić locked the door behind her. They took her to the bedroom by force while she was screaming and resisting.

Inside the bedroom, the five men told Kostić that they wanted to have sex with her and asked her to consent to their demands. When she refused, they tried, one by one, to persuade her. One of the men began to hesitate when he suspected she was still a virgin. Still, they continued to pressure her, but she continued refusing. At one moment, she was left alone in the room and jumped out from an open window. After falling for about 40 metres (130 ft), she landed on an awning of a cafe. The awning then broke, and she fell onto a chair. The cafe guests took her to the hospital.

She was admitted to the city hospital unconscious. In the hospital, she briefly regained consciousness and was questioned by the police inspector. She told him all the details of the incident and said that she jumped because she thought it was the only way for her to keep her honor. Soon she fell into a coma and died on Thursday, 4 September 1974.

== Aftermath ==
Milica Kostić was buried on 5 September in Strojinci. Thousands of people, including 400 of her fellow students, came to the funeral.

All major newspapers in Yugoslavia including Politika and Večernje Novosti reported widely on this incident. The public was outraged. On Wednesday, 4 September, the police had to protect the five perpetrators from a lynching attempt. The public interest about the event was enormous. On 5 September, the high school students silently demonstrated in Kruševac against violence, wearing a large photo of Kostić at the head of the column. As the public unanimously condemned the violence, the death of Milica Kostić had a lasting impact on both public and police reaction to violence. Police began to intensify preventive measures against youth violence.

Four perpetrators were sentenced to prison. On 27 December 1974, District Court of Kruševac sentenced Nikolić, Madžarac and Ivanović to 13 years each. The minor S.V. was sentenced to 6 years. Trifunović was tried as an accomplice, but was acquitted. It is not known for certain how much time each of them actually spent in prison. According to some reports, Nikolić was released after 9½ years.

The act of Milica Kostić was praised by many as brave and heroic. Glas Koncila, a Roman Catholic journal from Zagreb, called her "Maria Goretti of Šumadija". An initiative was made in the Serbian Orthodox Church to canonize Kostić as a martyr. Although she has not been canonized yet, she appears on a fresco in the parish church in Ub as "Saint Milica of Kruševac". According to some reports, famous singer Zdravko Čolić dedicated his song "Ona spava" ("She's Asleep") to Kostić.

In 2013, a controversy erupted when Nikolić, the main perpetrator of the crime, was elected as a member of the "Lazarica" local council in Kruševac. He is an activist of the Serbian Progressive Party (SNS). When asked about the eligibility of Nikolić, then Minister of Defense and high-ranking member of SNS, Bratislav Gašić, told the press that Nikolić "has served his sentence and has all the rights to be elected as any other citizen".
