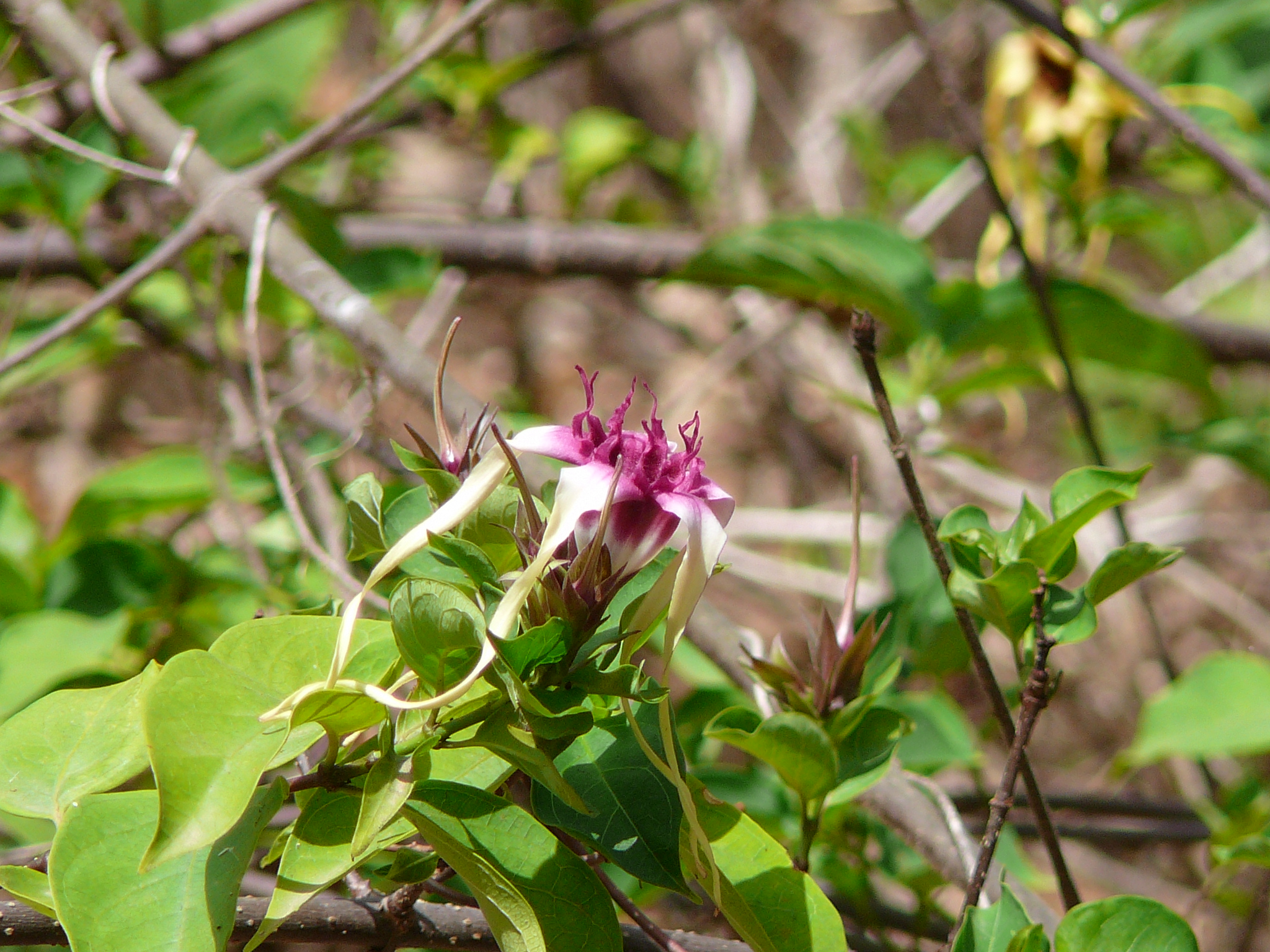
- Flowers

Scientific classification
- Kingdom: Plantae
- Clade: Embryophytes
- Clade: Tracheophytes
- Clade: Angiosperms
- Clade: Eudicots
- Clade: Asterids
- Order: Gentianales
- Family: Apocynaceae
- Genus: Strophanthus
- Species: S. sarmentosus

Binomial name
- Strophanthus sarmentosus DC.

Synonyms
- Strophanthus laurifolius DC.; Strophanthus pendulus Kumm. & Hook.; Strophanthus senegambiae A.DC.; Strophanthus ogovensis Franch.; Strophanthus punctifer A.Chev.; Strophanthus glabriflorus (Monach.) Monach.; Strophanthus paroissei Franch.

= Strophanthus sarmentosus =

Species of shrub

Strophanthus sarmentosus grows as either a deciduous shrub or as a liana up to 40 metres (130 ft) long, with a stem diameter up to 15 centimetres (6 in). Its fragrant flowers feature a white to purple corolla, red or purple-streaked on the inside. Strophanthus sarmentosus is native from west and central tropical Africa to Uganda and Angola. Vernacular names for the plant include spider tresses and poison arrow vine. Its habitat is forested areas from sea level to 1,400 metres (4,600 ft) altitude.

The numerous local medicinal uses of S. sarmentosus include treatment of joint pain, head lice, eye conditions and venereal disease. The plant has also been used as arrow poison. Botanist John Baldwin discovered that Strophanthus sarmentosus was a natural source of the steroid hormone cortisone and was used in the early manufacture of cortisone-based drugs. Research on active compounds focussed on the cardenolides. For instance, ouabain showed anti-venomous properties.

== Gallery ==
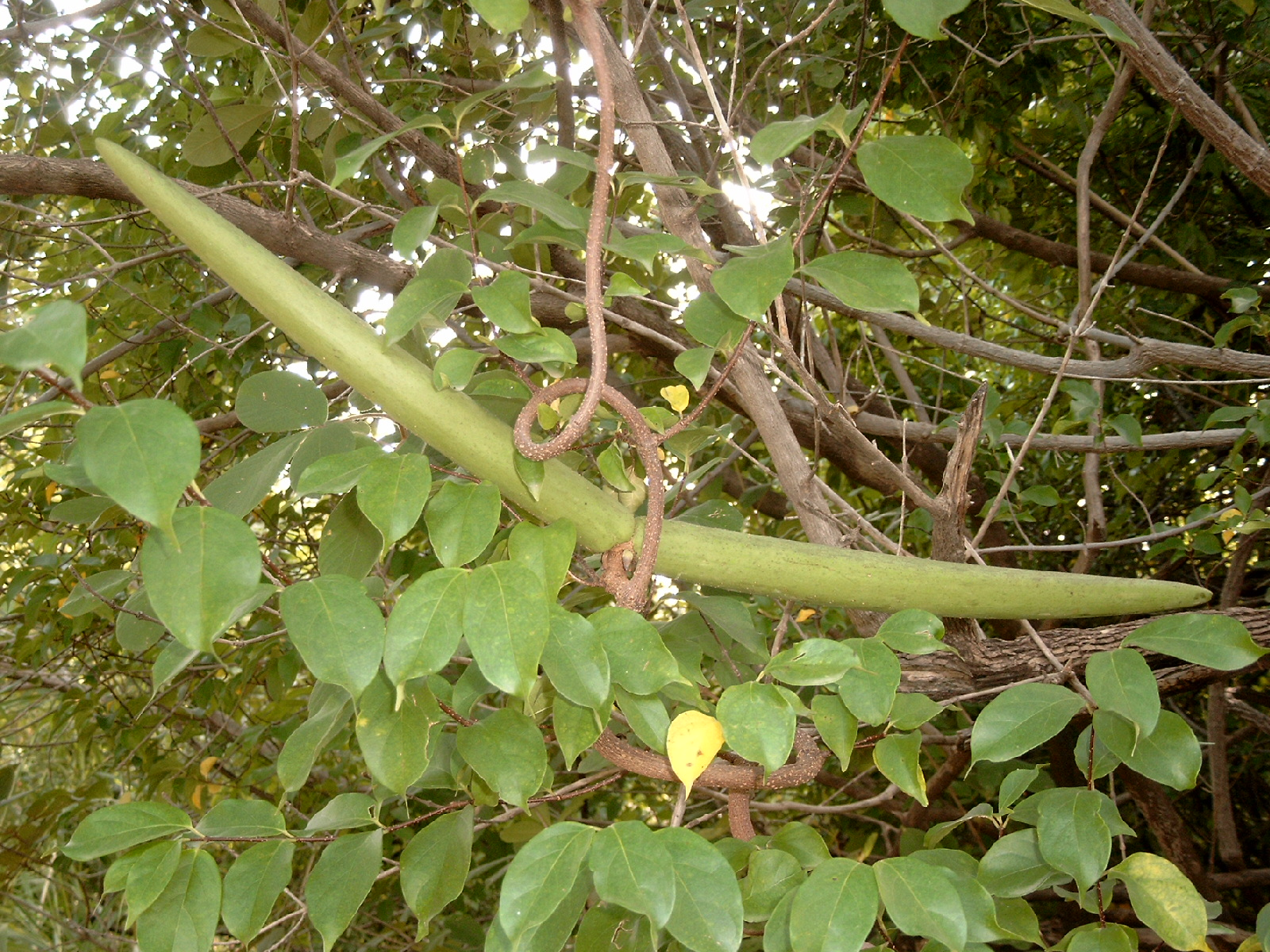
Horn-like, paired, follicular fruits
