= Mir Shaukat Ali Khan =

- Born: c. 1917
- Died: 22 May 2003 (aged 85–86); Islamabad, Pakistan
- Occupations: Ruler of a princely state within India and later Pakistan
- Awards: Hilal-i-Pakistan Award by the President of Pakistan

Mir Shaukat Ali Khan CBE (c. 1917 – 22 May 2003), (Urdu میر شوکت علی خان ) was the last ruler of Nagar State, first as a princely state in the Indian Empire, then as a fully independent state, and finally as one of the princely states of Pakistan, from 1940 to 1974. After that, he continued to carry out a purely ceremonial role and was also elected to a regional council.

== Early life ==
Shaukat Ali Khan was born about 1917, the son of Subedar Major Muhammad Ali Khan, a Viceroy's commissioned officer in the Indian Army, eldest son and heir of Mir Sikandar Khan of Nagar, who had ruled the state from 1905. However, his father died in 1922, leaving the young Shaukat as the heir apparent to his grandfather, who ruled until his death in 1940. Shaukat was educated at the Church Mission Society School in Srinagar.

In 1939, in a Government of India publication, Shaukat was reported as the heir to the state and was then said to have been born about 1920 and to be still studying at his school in Srinagar.

== Reign and later life ==
Shaukat Ali Khan succeeded his grandfather as Tham, or king, of Nagar in 1940. In his early years on the throne, he was reported to be absolutely loyal to the British. He was described a few years after his accession as "small, sharp-featured, and of a very fair complexion", and someone with a "keen sense of humour".

Nagar and Hunza were both valley states lying to the north of Kashmir and shared the same language and culture. On 18 November 1947 the rulers of both states signed Instruments of Accession to accede to Pakistan. They did so one week after the decision by Hari Singh, Maharajah of Jammu and Kashmir, to accede to India, at a time of disturbances, which had led to Indian Army troops moving into Kashmir.

Shaukat held the rank of brigadier in the Pakistan Army.

In 1968 Syed Yahya Shah, a politician of the Nagar valley, led a civil rights movement demanding more democracy from Shaukat, who was less popular than some other princes. In 1971, he was shaken by an uprising against his rule. On 25 September 1974, not long after the Pakistan People's Party under Zulfiqar Ali Bhutto had come to power, the new government forced Shaukat to abdicate his throne, and both Nagar and Hunza were merged into the Northern Areas, together with the other princely states of Gilgit-Baltistan, although the Mir of Nagar was left with a purely ceremonial role.

In 1980, Shaukat was elected as the Councillor for the Nagar District in the Northern Areas (or Gilgit-Baltistan) Legislative Council and was again in office in the 1990s.

== Death ==
Shaukat Ali Khan died on 22 May 2003 of kidney failure at Islamabad, at the age 86. He was survived by three sons, two daughters and a widow. His eldest son, Barkat Ali Khan, was then a senior official of the Pakistan Foreign Service and succeeded his father as the ceremonial ruler of the former Nagar state.

== Honours ==
- Hilal Quaid-I-Azam
- Hilal-i-Pakistan (Crescent of Pakistan) awarded by the President of Pakistan
