= John Thomas Baldwin =

American botanist (1910–1974)

John Thomas Baldwin Jr.
- Born: September 5, 1910; Chase City, Virginia, US
- Died: September 3, 1974 (aged 63); Williamsburg, Virginia, US
- Education: University of Virginia; Cornell University
- Alma mater: College of William & Mary
- Scientific career
- Fields: Botany
- Institutions: College of William & Mary
- Author abbrev. (botany): J.T.Baldwin

John Thomas Baldwin Jr. (September 5, 1910 – September 3, 1974) was an American botanist. He specialized in cytogenetics of plants and in his early career studied the family Crassulaceae. In 1946 Baldwin was appointed professor at his alma mater, the College of William & Mary. He also worked for the US Department of Agriculture, accompanying their expeditions to Africa. During the 1947–48 US Economic Mission to Liberia Baldwin discovered that Strophanthus sarmentosus was a natural source of the steroid hormone cortisone and it was subsequently used for the manufacture of drugs. He planted an extensive collection of plants on the college campus, which later botanists claimed to be one of the most important in the country. After Baldwin's death, the college donated land to form a memorial park in his honor. The standard author abbreviation J.T.Baldwin is used to indicate this person as the author when citing a botanical name.

== Early life and career ==
John Thomas Baldwin Junior was born on September 5, 1910, in Chase City, Virginia. He was a graduate of the College of William & Mary and received a Doctor of Philosophy degree from the University of Virginia. Baldwin also studied at Cornell University and joined the faculty of the College of William & Mary in 1937 as an instructor. He specialised in cytogenetics, with regard to plant chromosomes. Baldwin studied plants of the crassulaceae (stonecrop) family between 1938 and 1949. The cultivar Kalanchoe x houghtonii 'J.T. Baldwin', which he had published the original cytological data for and illustrated, was named after him in recognition of his work.

Baldwin worked as an instructor of botany at the University of Michigan between 1939 and 1941. Between 1942 and 1944 he was an associate cytologist for the US Department of Agriculture during investigations of rubber plants in the Amazon valley. Between 1944 and 1946 Baldwin was assistant professor and manager of the Blandy Experimental Farm at the University of Virginia.

== Professor at William & Mary ==
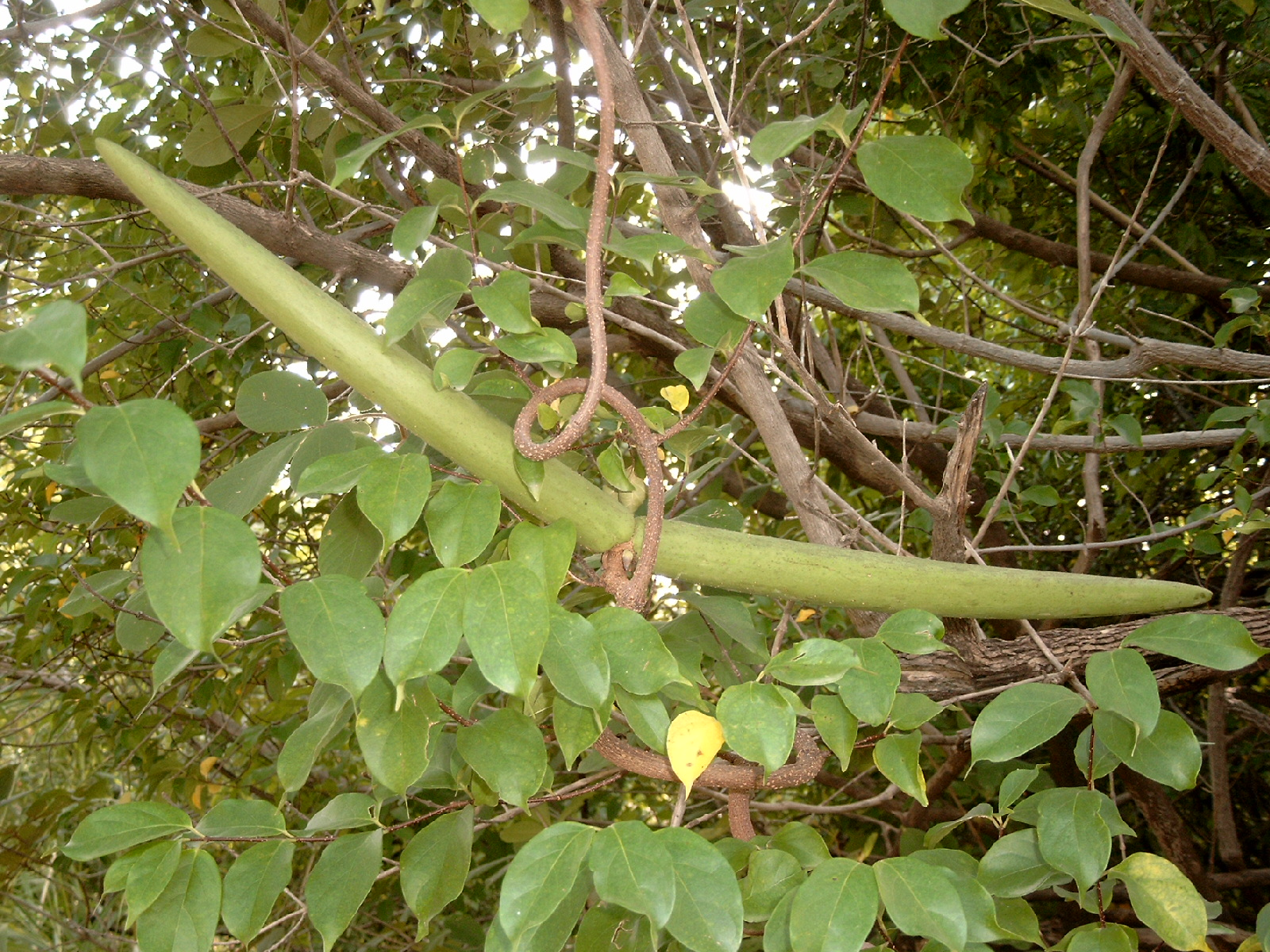
Strophanthus sarmentosus

Baldwin returned to the College of William & Mary in 1946 as a professor, a position he would hold for the rest of his life. He served as horticulturalist of the 1947–48 US Economic Mission to Liberia. On this expedition he studied the distribution, prevalence and behavior of Strophanthus plants. Baldwin discovered that Strophanthus sarmentosus was a natural source of the steroid hormone cortisone. The sarmentosus plant was used in the early manufacture of cortisone-based drugs. He returned to Africa for a 1949–50 Department of Agriculture Division of Plant Exploration survey of cortisone-producing plants. Baldwin served as chairman of the college's department of biology between 1952 and 1962.

He brought many plants to the college's campus for study and the education of students. Baldwin said that "books are for pleasure and teaching, and so is a collection of plants" and thought that his collection was as important to the university as its library. Later botanists would regard Baldwin's collection as one of the most important in the United States.

Baldwin obtained seeds of the Metasequoia (Dawn redwood) tree whilst travelling in Belgium. The tree was known from fossils but thought extinct until its rediscovery in 1940s China. The seeds had been sent abroad by Harvard University's Arnold Arboretum to see how they grew. The specimens thrived at the College of William & Mary.

Baldwin grew many cedars within his collection. He found that Cryptomerias from Japan grew particularly well and referred to Williamsburg as the Cryptomeria capital of the world. He obtained and grew three specimens of the Atlas Mountain Cedar, Cedrus atlantica. When one of these was cut down by students for use as a Christmas tree in the 1960s he tracked down the perpetrators and fined them $100.

Baldwin died on September 3, 1974, in Williamsburg.

== Legacy ==
After Baldwin's death, botanists at the college worked to identify all of the plants in his collection and to organise his records. A small memorial park was established by Tidewater District Council and the Williamsburg Area Council of Garden Clubs on May 1, 1977. The land for the park had been donated by the college and it was planted with specimens propagated from Baldwin's collection. Baldwin had a history of involvement with the council of garden clubs, who had awarded him their 1971 prize.

The grass species Loudetia baldwinii and Loudetiopsis baldwinii are named after Baldwin.
