= Morning Cloud =

Series of yachts

Morning Cloud was the name given by the British politician Edward Heath to a series of five yachts which he owned between 1969 and 1983.

== The yachts ==
=== No. 1 ===
Sparkman and Stephens S&S 34, length 34 feet (10 m), year of launch 1969. Edward Heath won the Sydney to Hobart Yacht Race with this boat in the same year. She was sold in December 1970 to Stewart Benest of Jersey, who renamed her Nuage de Matin. She sank off Gorey Castle, Jersey, on 2 September 1974, after the seas took her from her moorings.

=== No. 2 ===
Designed by Sparkman and Stephens, length 42 feet (13 m), hull and deck material wood (mahogany), constructed by Lallows (UK), year of launch 1971. Heath used the boat in the Admiral's Cup of that year as part of the winning British team. At least two copies of the boat were built under licence from him.

=== No. 3 ===
Designed by Sparkman and Stephens, length 44 feet 9 inches (13.64 m), hull and deck material wood, constructed by Lallows (UK), year of launch 1973. It was used in the Admiral's Cup of that year, but Heath was only on board for the Fastnet race because of other commitments. It was lost at sea on 2 September 1974 when it was hit by a large wave while en route to Cowes from Burnham-on-Crouch. Heath was not on board. Two of the seven crew drowned. It was insured by Lloyd's of London. This was within 24 hours of the sinking of Morning Cloud I.

=== No. 4 ===
Designed by Sparkman and Stephens, length 45 feet (14 m), hull and deck material aluminium, constructed by Allday Aluminium of Gosport and Camper and Nicholsons (yard number 1390), year of launch 1975.

=== No. 5 ===
Designed by Ron Holland, length 44 feet (13 m), hull and deck material aluminium, year of launch 1977. In a Channel Race during the British team trials it lost its rudder (it was a new carbon fibre prototype). In the 1979 Fastnet race (which was part of the Admiral's Cup) it was turned upside down by a large wave after rounding the Fastnet Rock at 0100h but despite suffering some damage and shock to the whole crew it was still able to finish. Heath was on board for all races of the Admiral’s Cup, including the Fastnet Race. Heath sold the boat in 1983. She was purchased by Larry Huntington and converted to a cat ketch and raced actively on the US East Coast in the 80s and 90s. Her new rig was slower on many points of sail, but was particularly advantageous on a close reach, leading to her 1990 Bermuda Race victory.
