= Nagar (princely state) =

Princely state of the British Raj and Pakistan

Nagar state ریاست نگر
- c. 1300–August 1972
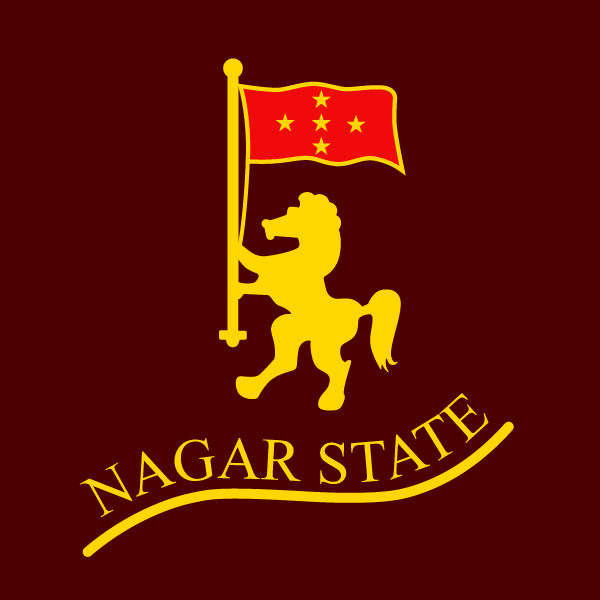
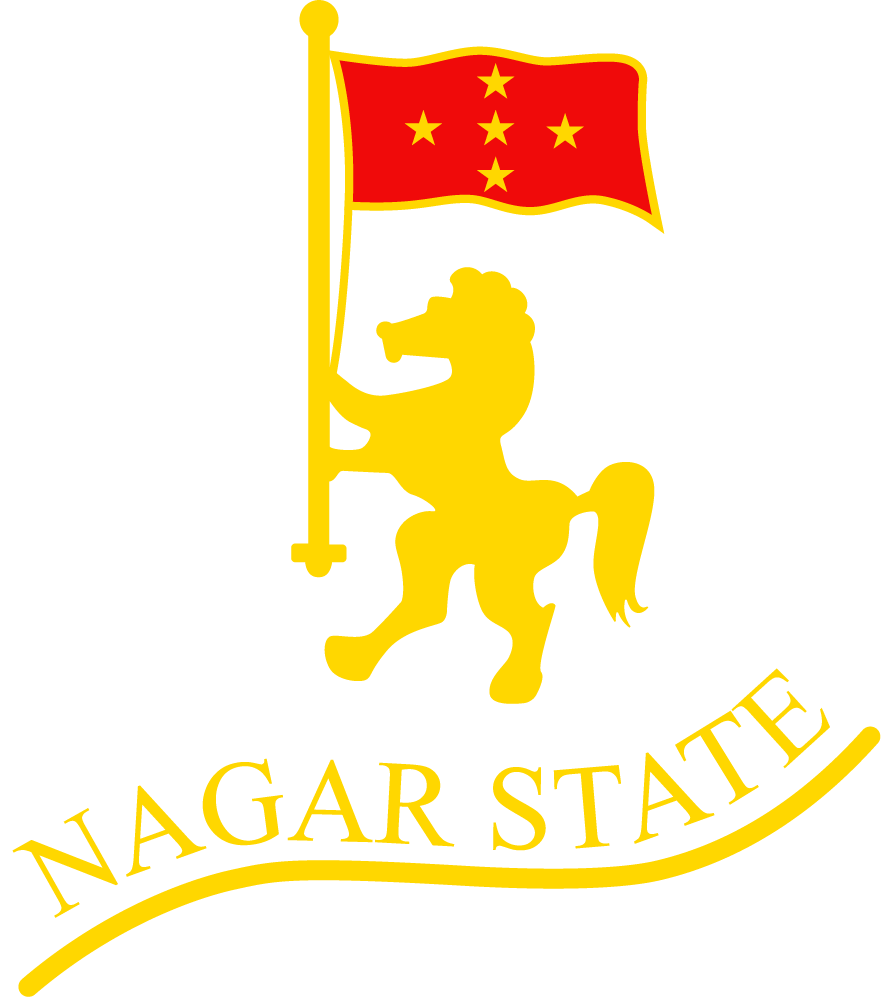
- Flag Coat of arms

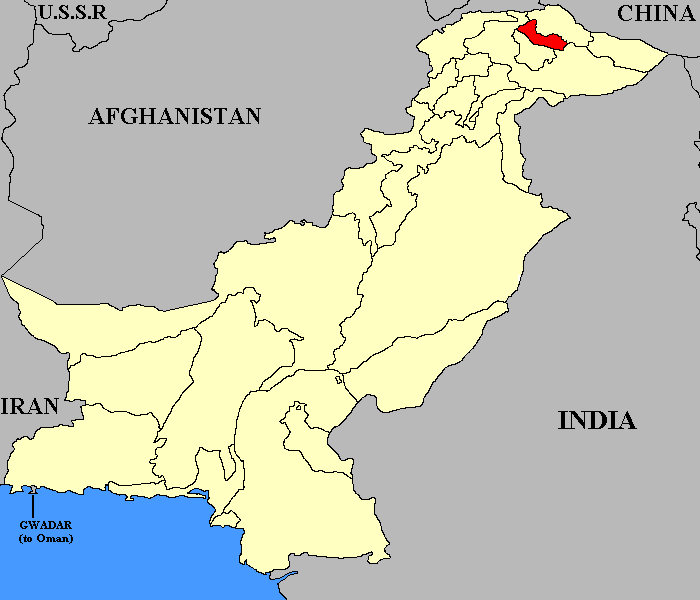
- Map of Pakistan with Nagar highlighted
- Capital: Nagarkhas
- Common languages: Burushaski; Shina
- Religion: Shia Isna'asheri (Jafaria)
- Government: Absolute Monarchy
- Mir
  - 1660-1700: Fazil Khan (first known)
  - 1940-1974: Mir Shaukat Ali Khan (last)
- History
  - Established: c. 1300
  - Hunza–Nagar Campaign: 1891
  - Acceded to Pakistan: 1947
  - Disestablished: August 1972

Area
  - Total: 1,600 sq mi (4,100 km^{2})

Population
  - 1941 census: 14,874
Succeeded by
Northern Areas, Pakistan
- Today part of: Pakistan; Gilgit Baltistan

Nagar (Urdu: ریاست نگر, Riyasat Nagar) was a Burusho princely state located in the northern region of present-day Gilgit–Baltistan, Pakistan. Between 1891 and 1947, it maintained a subsidiary alliance with British India. Although under the suzerainty of Maharaja of Jammu and Kashmir after 1891, Nagar was not a part of Kashmir, and had status of a separate state. It shared its borders with the Gilgit Agency states to the south and west, while to the north and east, it bordered the princely state of Hunza.

From November 1947 to August 1972, Nagar was a princely state within Pakistan, with its administrative center in the town of Nagar. The territory of the former princely state now comprises the Nagar District in northern Pakistan.

== History ==
Nagar was established in the 14th century and existed as an autonomous principality until the British exerted control over the region after the Hunza–Nagar Campaign (1889–1893). Subsequently, it became a princely state under the jurisdiction of the British Political Agent at Gilgit until 1947. Nagar accepted suzerainty of the Maharaja of Jammu and Kashmir as well, though it was never directly governed by Kashmir. The rulers of Nagar sent annual tributes to the Kashmir Durbar until 1947.

In November 1947, the Nagar ruler Mir Shaukat Ali Khan, acceded his state to the Dominion of Pakistan, which became responsible for its external affairs and defense, while Nagar retained internal self-government. In 1968, Syed Yahya Shah, the first educated politician of the state, demanded civil rights from the Mir of Nagar. In 1972, the Pakistan People's Party government (under Prime Minister Zulfiqar Ali Bhutto) abolished the state and forced the Mir of Nagar to abdicate. The territory was then merged with the Northern Areas.

== Government ==
The state was governed by the hereditary rulers of the Maglot dynasty, who were referred to as Mir. The details of these early rulers are uncertain; the first definite dates available are from 1839. In November 1947, the state became one of the princely states of Pakistan. Brigadier Mir Shaukat Ali Khan was the last ruler of the State before it was abolished by Prime Minister Zulfiqar Ali Bhutto in 1972.

Reign	Mirs of Nagar
1660 – 1700	Fazil Khan
1700 – 1750	Daud Khan
1750 – 1758	Ali Dad Khan
1758 – 1761	Hari Tham Khan
1761 – 1770	Ali Dad Khan
1770 – 1780	Kamal Khan
1780 – 1800	Rahim Khan I
1800 – 1839	Rahim Khan II
1839 – 1891	Jaffar Zahid Khan
1891 – 1892	Raja Ozor Khan
1892 – 1904	Jaffar Zahid Khan
1904 – 1940	Raja Mir Iskandar Khan
1940 – 2003	Mir Shaukat Ali Khan
2003 – 2011	Mir Barkat Ali Khan
2011 – present	Mir Qasim Ali Khan

== Population ==
=== Demographics ===
Nagar had a population of 14,874 in 1941, and covered an area of 1,600 sq mi (4,100 km^{2}). The major ethnic groups were the Burusho and the Shina people. An older form of Burushaski was still spoken in the valley. The population was predominantly Twelver Shi'a.

== Geography ==
The terrain of Nagar Valley is highly mountainous, which offered a degree of natural protection against invading forces. The highest peak in the area is Mount Dastagilsar, standing at 7,885 meters, located in Hisper to the south of the town of Nagar.

== Sources and external links ==
- Government of Pakistan
