= Bakhmatiuk =

Bakhmatiuk is a surname. Notable people with the surname include:

- Oleg Bakhmatiuk, Ukrainian businessman and politician
- Oleksa Bakhmatiuk (1820–1882), Ukrainian master of decorative tile painting
