= Kosov =

Kosov may refer to:

== Dynasties ==
- Kosov (Hasidic dynasty)

== Places in the Czech Republic ==
- Kosov (Šumperk District), a municipality and village in the Olomouc Region
- Kosov, a village and part of Bor (Tachov District) in the Plzeň Region
- Kosov, a village and part of Jihlava in the Vysočina Region
- Kosov, a village and part of Kamenný Újezd (České Budějovice District) in the South Bohemian Region
- Košov, a village and part of Lomnice nad Popelkou in the Liberec Region

== Surname ==
- Kosov (surname)

== See also ==
- Kosiv, a city in Ukraine
- Kosovo
