= Baraniuk =

Baraniuk is a surname. Notable people with the surname include:

- Ivan Baraniuk (1816–1880), Ukrainian master of artistic ceramics
- Mykhailo Baraniuk (1816–1880), Ukrainian folk master of artistic ceramics
- Richard Baraniuk, American electrical engineer and academic
- Volodymyr Baraniuk (born 1974), Ukrainian soldier and colonel
