= Joseph ben Jacob of Pinczow =

Joseph ben Jacob of Pinczow (Hebrew: יוסף בן יעקב מפינטשוב; fl. 17th and early 18th centuries) was a Lithuanian Talmudic scholar.

Joseph studied under Tzvi Hirsch, Av Beit Din of Lublin. By 1687, he held a rabbinic position in Kosowi, after which he was appointed rabbi in Syeltzy. He left that town for Hamburg in 1702 due to the persecution of Jews under the Swedish occupation of the region amid the Great Northern War. Joseph returned to Syeltzy in 1706, but was once again forced to leave in 1710, this time because of the outbreak of an epidemic. He subsequently moved to Berlin, where he published his Rosh Yosef, a work containing notes on various Talmudic treatises.
