= Dmytro Oliinyk =

- Дмитро Ігорович Олійник

Deputy Governor of the National Bank of Ukraine
- Incumbent
- Assumed office October 25, 2022
- Nominated by: Andriy Pyshnyy

Personal details
- Born: April 18, 1986 (age 40) Ukraine
- Citizenship: Ukrainian
- Education: PhD in Economics
- Alma mater: Khmelnytskyi National University
- Occupation: Financier, civil servant
- Known for: Deputy Governor of the National Bank of Ukraine

Dmytro Ihorovych Oliinyk (Ukrainian: Дмитро Ігорович Олійник; born April 18, 1986) is a Ukrainian financier and civil servant who has served as the Deputy Governor of the National Bank of Ukraine (NBU) since October 2022. He oversees the Prudential Supervision block, including regulation of the banking and non-banking financial sectors.

== Early life and education ==
Oliinyk graduated from Khmelnytskyi National University in 2007 with a degree in Economic Cybernetics. He later earned a PhD from the same institution in 2011.

== Career ==
He began his banking career in 2005 at Ukrsibbank. Between 2007 and 2013, he held various positions in several Ukrainian and international banks. In 2013, he joined PricewaterhouseCoopers (PwC) as a consultant specializing in the banking sector of Central and Eastern Europe.

In 2017, Oliinyk joined the state-owned Oschadbank, where he served as Director of the Credit Risk Department and later as Director of the General Risk Management Department. In 2019, he was appointed Director of the Financial Policy Department at the Ministry of Finance of Ukraine. From May 2021 until his NBU appointment, he served as the Director General of the Economic Policy Directorate within the Office of the President of Ukraine.

On October 25, 2022, the NBU Council appointed Oliinyk as Deputy Governor upon the nomination of Governor Andriy Pyshnyy.

== Controversies and investigations ==
Since taking office, Oliinyk has faced scrutiny regarding his personal finances and professional conduct, leading to investigations by anti-corruption authorities and the Ukrainian parliament.

=== NABU Investigation and Dubai Real Estate ===
In November 2025, the High Anti-Corruption Court (HACC) ordered the National Anti-Corruption Bureau (NABU) to open criminal proceedings regarding the possible illicit enrichment of Dmytro Oliinyk. he inquiry follows media reports that his family owns luxury apartments in Dubai's Zenith Tower. While the property is registered to his former wife, critics point out it was omitted from his 2023 financial disclosure, despite the filing acknowledging his ex-wife's UAE-based income.

=== Allegations of Fictitious Divorce ===
Journalists have alleged that Oliinyk's divorce was a legal maneuver to avoid declaring his spouse's foreign assets. Reports suggest the couple remains together, citing Oliinyk's frequent travel to Vienna and Dubai to meet his family after the legal separation was finalized.

=== Meeting with Oleg Bakhmatyuk ===
Media outlets reported an unconfirmed meeting in Vienna between Oliinyk and fugitive banker Oleg Bakhmatyuk. Bakhmatyuk is currently wanted in Ukraine for the embezzlement of stabilization loans. Because Oliinyk oversees banking supervision, the alleged contact raised concerns regarding a potential conflict of interest.

=== "Operation Midas" and cash tracking ===
During a November 2025 parliamentary inquiry into "Operation Midas", a corruption case involving Energoatom, Oliinyk was questioned about the origin of large sums of U.S. cash seized by investigators. Oliinyk stated that the NBU does not track the serial numbers of currency imported by private firms. This admission drew criticism regarding the NBU's ability to monitor the flow of physical cash within the country.

=== Investment preferences ===
Oliinyk has also faced public criticism for his personal investment choices. Financial disclosures show he holds significant savings in U.S. dollars, Euros, and foreign securities. This has been characterized as hypocritical by some observers, given the NBU's public campaigns encouraging Ukrainian citizens to hold their savings in Hryvnia to support national currency stability.
