= Pysanka (disambiguation) =

Pysanka is a Ukrainian decorated egg

Pysanka may also refer to:

- Ruslana Pysanka (1965–2022), Ukrainian actress and cinematographer
- Pysanka Museum, Ukraine
- Pysanka, Kropyvnytskyi Raion, village in Ukraine
- Pysanka Duet, Ukrainian folklore music duet
