= Agricultural land =

Land used for agricultural purposes

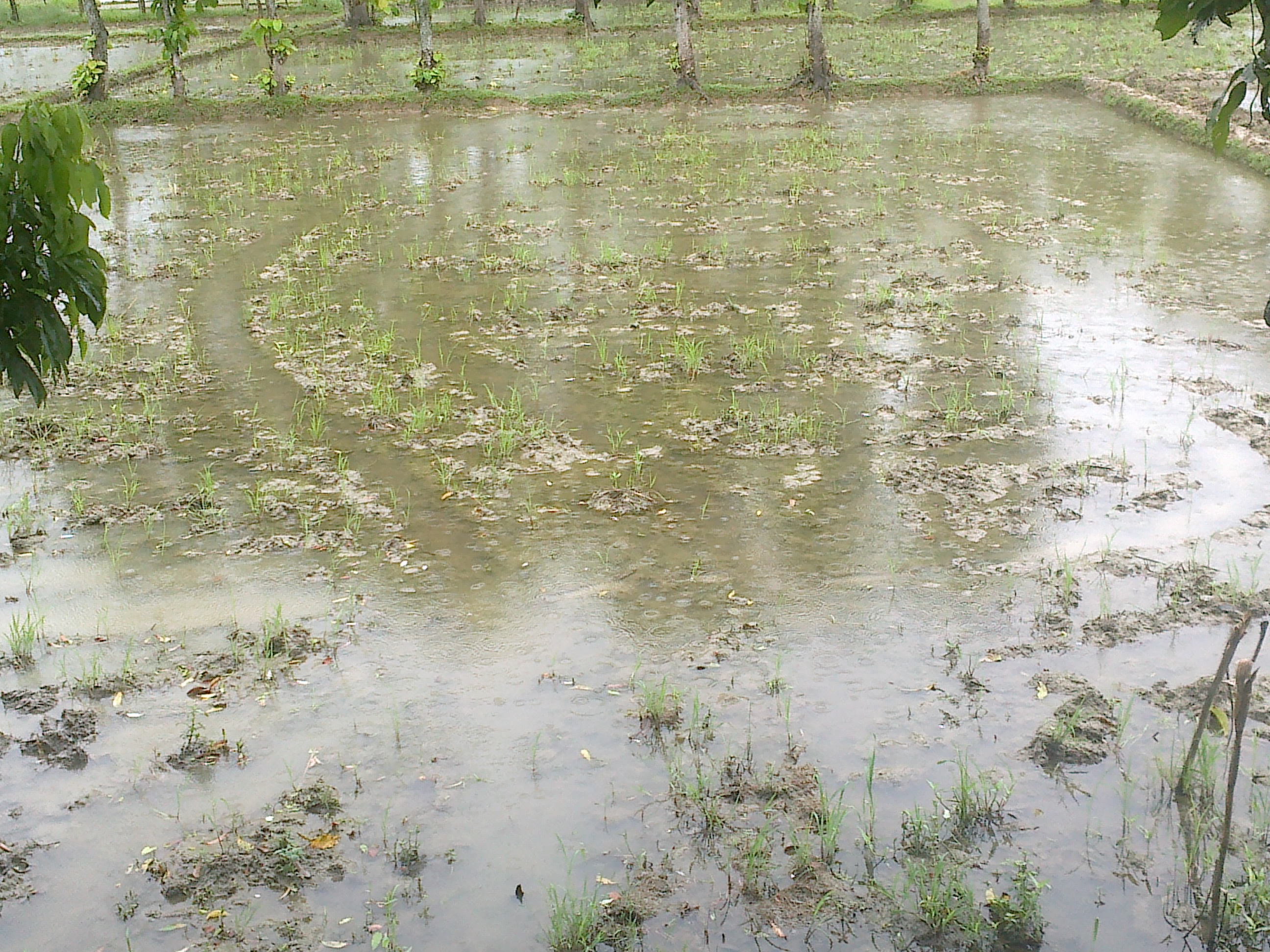
Photo showing piece of agricultural land irrigated and ploughed for paddy cultivation

Share of land area used for agriculture

Agricultural land is typically land devoted to agriculture, the systematic and controlled use of other forms of life—particularly the rearing of livestock and production of crops—to produce food for humans. It is generally synonymous with both farmland or cropland, as well as pasture or rangeland.

The Food and Agriculture Organization (FAO) and other institutions define agricultural land or agricultural area as a collection of:

- arable land (also known as cropland): here redefined to refer to land producing crops requiring annual replanting or fallowland or pasture used for such crops within any five-year period
- permanent cropland: land producing crops which do not require annual replanting
- permanent pastures: natural or artificial grasslands and shrublands able to be used for grazing livestock

This sense of "agricultural land" thus includes a great deal of land not devoted to agricultural use. The land actually under annually-replanted crops in any given year is instead said to constitute sown land or cropped land. "Permanent cropland" includes forested plantations used to harvest coffee, rubber, or fruit but not tree farms or proper forests used for wood or timber. Land able to be used for farming is called cultivable land. Farmland, meanwhile, is used variously in reference to all agricultural land, to all cultivable land, or just to the newly restricted sense of "arable land". Depending upon its use of artificial irrigation, the FAO's "agricultural land" may be divided into irrigated and non-irrigated land.

In the context of zoning, agricultural land or agriculturally-zoned land refers to plots that are permitted to be used for agricultural activities, without regard to its present use or even suitability. In some areas, agricultural land is protected so that it can be farmed without any threat of development. The Agricultural Land Reserve in British Columbia in Canada, for instance, requires approval from its Agricultural Land Commission before its lands can be removed or subdivided.

== Area ==
Cropland nitrogen budget by component and region, a large proportion comes from fertilizers.

Under the FAO's definition, agricultural land covers 38.4% of the world's land area as of 2011 and in 2023 4.80 billion hectares (ha), down 2 percent, or 0.07 billion ha, compared with 2000. In 2011 permanent pastures are 68.4% of all agricultural land (26.3% of global land area), arable land (row crops) is 28.4% of all agricultural land (10.9% of global land area), and permanent crops (e.g. vineyards and orchards) are 3.1% (1.2% of global land area).

- Total of land used to produce food: 49,116,227 square kilometers or 18,963,881 square miles
- Arable land: 13,963,743 square kilometers or 5,391,431 square miles
- Permanent pastures: 33,585,676 square kilometers or 12,967,502 square miles
- Permanent crops: 1,537,338 square kilometers or 593,570 square miles

In 2022, the global agricultural land area was 4.78 billion hectares (ha), down from 4.79 billion hectares in 2021. One-third of the total agricultural land was cropland (1.58 billion ha in 2021), which increased by 6 percent (0.09 billion ha).

In 2023, Asia had the largest share of the global cropland area in 2023 (37%), followed by the Americas (23%), Africa (20%), Europe (18%) and Oceania (2%). Approximately 30% of global cropland and permanent meadows and pastures can be found in three countries; 12% of global permanent meadows and pastures belonged to China, 10% to Australia and 8% to the United States of America. For the same year, the largest contributors to global cropland were India (11%), the United States of America (10%) and China (8%)

Agricultural area over the long-term.

Agricultural-area-per-capita.

World agricultural land by use, permanent meadows and pastures and cropland.

Area used for crops by country in 2021.

Distribution of cropland area, 2020.

World agricultural land area by main category, 2023.

Asia had the largest share of the global cropland area in 2021 (37 percent), followed by the Americas (24 percent), Africa (19 percent), Europe (18 percent) and Oceania (2 percent). There were differences in cropland expansion in the different regions during this period – Oceania and Africa both had rapid growth in cropland area (33 percent and 27 percent), while Asia and the Americas had more moderate growth (4 percent and 2 percent). The cropland area of Europe declined between 2000 and 2021 by 5 percent. As a result, the cropland area of Africa overtook that of Europe in 2018.

Approximately 30 percent of global cropland and permanent meadows and pastures can be found in three countries. In 2021, 12 percent of global permanent meadows and pastures belonged to China, 10 percent to Australia, and 8 percent to the United States of America. For the same year, the largest share of global cropland was in India (11 percent), followed by the United States of America (10 percent) and China (8 percent).

Cropland area per capita decreased in all regions between 2000 and 2021 as population increased faster than the cropland area. The world average declined by 18 percent to 0.20 ha per capita in 2021; the decrease was the largest in Africa (−25 percent, to0.21 ha per capita), followed by the Americas and Asia (−17 percent each, to 0.37 ha per capita and 0.13 ha per capita, respectively), Europe and Oceania (−7 percent each, to 0.39 ha per capita and 0.77 ha per capita, respectively). The countries with the highest cropland area per capita are Kazakhstan, Australia and Canada, due to vast areas of land available.

Globally, the total amount of permanent pasture according to the FAO has been in decline since 1998, in part due to a decrease of wool production in favor of synthetic fibers (such as polyester) and cotton.

The decrease of permanent pasture, however, does not account for gross conversion (e.g. land extensively cleared for agriculture in some areas, while converted from agriculture to other uses elsewhere) and more detailed analyses have demonstrated this. For example, Lark et al. 2015 found that in the United States cropland increased by 2.98 million acres from 2008 to 2012 (comprising 7.34 million acres (29,700 km^{2}) converted to agriculture, and 4.36 million acres (17,600 km^{2}) converted from agriculture).

Agricultural land area (thousands of km^{2})
	2008	2009	2010	2011
USA	4,044	4,035	4,109	4,113
Germany	169	169	167	167

Source: Helgi Library, World Bank, FAOSTAT

== Agricultural land market ==
Prices and rents for agricultural land depend on supply and demand.

Prices/rents rise when the supply of farmland on the market reduces. Landholders then put more land on the market – causing prices to fall. Conversely, land prices/rents fall when the demand for agricultural land declines because of falls in the returns from holding and using it. The immediate triggers for falls in land demand might be reductions in the demand for farm produce or in relevant government subsidies and tax reliefs.

=== Russia ===
The cost of Russian farmland is as little as €1,500–2,000 (£1,260–1,680) per hectare (ha) (£1,260–1,680). This is comparatively inexpensive. In 2024, arable land averaged €6,400/ha in France and €12,778/ha in Spain..

The average Russian farm measures 150 hectares (370 acres). The most prevalent crops in Russia are wheat, barley, corn, rice, sugar beet, soy beans, sunflower, potatoes and vegetables. Russian farmers harvested roughly 85–90 million tonnes of wheat annually in the years around 2010. Russia exported most to Egypt, Turkey and Iran in 2012; China was a significant export market as well. The average yield from the Krasnodar region was between 4 and 5 tonnes per ha, while the Russian average was only 2t/ha. The Basic Element Group, a conglomerate owned by Oleg Deripaska, is one of Russia's leading agricultural producers, and owns or manages 109,000ha of Russian farmland, out of 90m actual and 115m total (0.12% actual).

=== Ukraine ===
In 2013, Ukraine was ranked third in corn production and sixth in wheat production. It was the main supplier of corn, wheat, and rape to Europe, although it is unclear whether the internal supply from countries like France were accounted in this calculation. Ukrainian farmers achieve 60% of the output per unit area of their North American competitors. UkrLandFarming PLC produces, from 650,000 hectares (1.6m acres), corn, wheat, barley, sugar beet, and sunflowers. Until 2014, the chief Ukrainian export terminal was the Crimean port of Sevastopol.

=== United States ===
Prime farmland in Illinois is valued, as of August 2018, at $26,000 a hectare. Average cropland value in the Midwest according to 2020 data from the US Department of Agriculture is $4,607 per acre (about $11,000 per hectare).

== Land reform ==
Ownership of agricultural land and its distribution among the population is a key driver of a wide range of social, political and economic inequalities. Land reform (also known as agrarian reform) refers to the process of changing who owns agricultural land and who has the right to use these lands. Redistributive land reform refers to the narrower concept of transferring agricultural land ownership from large private landowners to small farmers and people without any landholdings. It involves the redistribution of wealth and political power that comes from owning large swathes of land. There are different types of land reform, including state-led and market-led agrarian reforms.

== See also ==
- English land law
- Farmer
- Land grabbing

== Sources ==
This article incorporates text from a free content work. Licensed under CC BY-SA IGO 3.0 (license statement/permission). Text taken from World Food and Agriculture – Statistical Yearbook 2023, FAO, FAO.

This article incorporates text from a free content work. Licensed under CC BY 4.0 (license statement/permission). Text taken from World Food and Agriculture – Statistical Yearbook 2025, Food and Agriculture Organization of the United Nations.
