= Ivan Baraniuk =

Ukrainian master of artistic ceramics (1816–1880)

- Іван Баранюк
- Born: 1816; Moskalivka, now part of Kosiv, now Ivano-Frankivsk Oblast, Ukraine
- Died: 1880; Moskalivka, now part of Kosiv, now Ivano-Frankivsk Oblast, Ukraine
- Occupation: Master of artistic ceramics

Ivan Baraniuk (Ukrainian: Іван Баранюк; 1816, Moskalivka, now part of Kosiv – 1880, same place) was a Ukrainian master of artistic ceramics, the founder of the Kosiv school of painted ceramics. He was the father of Mykhailo and the grandfather of Yosyp Baraniuk.

== Creative ==
His creative legacy includes the creation of over a hundred tiled fireplaces (tile chimney), as well as a large number of household items such as bowls and candlesticks (lanterns).

In his work, Baraniuk used traditional ceramic decoration techniques: rizhkuvannia (applying colored clay or engobe using a special horn/funnel to create lines and patterns) and ryttia (scratching or engraving patterns onto the surface).

His ceramic products—tiles and bowls—are easily recognizable due to his original, signature painting style, which transforms them into visual narratives. The themes of his paintings are extremely diverse: from lush flowers, depictions of animals and mythical creatures to everyday scenes and heraldic signs. Sacred motifs—crosses, faces of saints, and churches—occupy a special place. Notably, Baraniuk often placed dates of manufacture on his products, primarily on tiles depicting Saint Nicholas the Wonderworker, the double-headed eagle, and much less frequently on tiles adorned with everyday scenes.

Baraniuk's compositions are characterized by calmness and monumentality. Unlike the works of his followers, they lack dynamism. The master, as a rule, completely filled the surface of the product with the main figures, leaving minimal space for auxiliary elements. The researcher D. Hoberman highly valued the color palette of his works, noting their "heightened color intensity", achieved by the harmonious contrast of red-brown and green colors.

His works are stored in the collections of the National Museum of Folk Architecture and Folkways of Ukraine, the Ivan Honchar Museum, and others. Among his students was Oleksa Bakhmatiuk.
