= Rostyslav Derzhypilsky =

Ukrainian theatre director and actor (born 1975)

Rostyslav Lyubomyrovych Derzhypilsky (born October 7, 1975, Kosiv, Ivano-Frankivsk Oblast) is a Ukrainian theater director and actor, People's Artist of Ukraine, and the artistic director of the Ivano-Frankivsk Academic Regional Music and Drama Theater named after Ivan Franko.

== Productions ==
- Theatrical Singing at the Observatory" 2014.
- “Oscar and the Lady in Pink” 2015
- Hamlet, 2017
- Romeo and Juliet, 2021
- “Sweet Darussa” 2021
- ‘Vyshyvany. King of Ukraine’ 2021

== Honors ==
- 2007 - Honored Artist of Ukraine
- 2009 - Laureate of the Volodymyr Blavatsky National Union of Theater Actors of Ukraine Award (USA-Ukraine)
- 2009 - Medal "For Merits to Prykarpattia" of Ivano-Frankivsk Regional State Administration and Ivano-Frankivsk Regional Council
- 2013 - Laureate of the Vitaliy Smolyak Prize in the field of theatrical art
- 2015 - Diploma of the Cabinet of Ministers of Ukraine
- 2015 - People's Artist of Ukraine
- 2019 - Laureate of the Shevchenko Prize in the nomination "Theatrical Art" - for performances of "Aeneid" by I. Kotlyarevsky, "She is the Earth" by V. Stefanyk, "HAMLET" by V. Shakespeare, "Oscar and the Lady in Pink" by E.E. Schmitt, Ivano-Frankivsk National Academic Drama Theater named after Ivan Franko
- 2020 - Order of Merit III degree
