= National Museum of Hutsulshchyna and Pokuttia Folk Art =

Museum in Kolomyia, Ukraine

Coordinates: 48.5289°N 25.0376°E

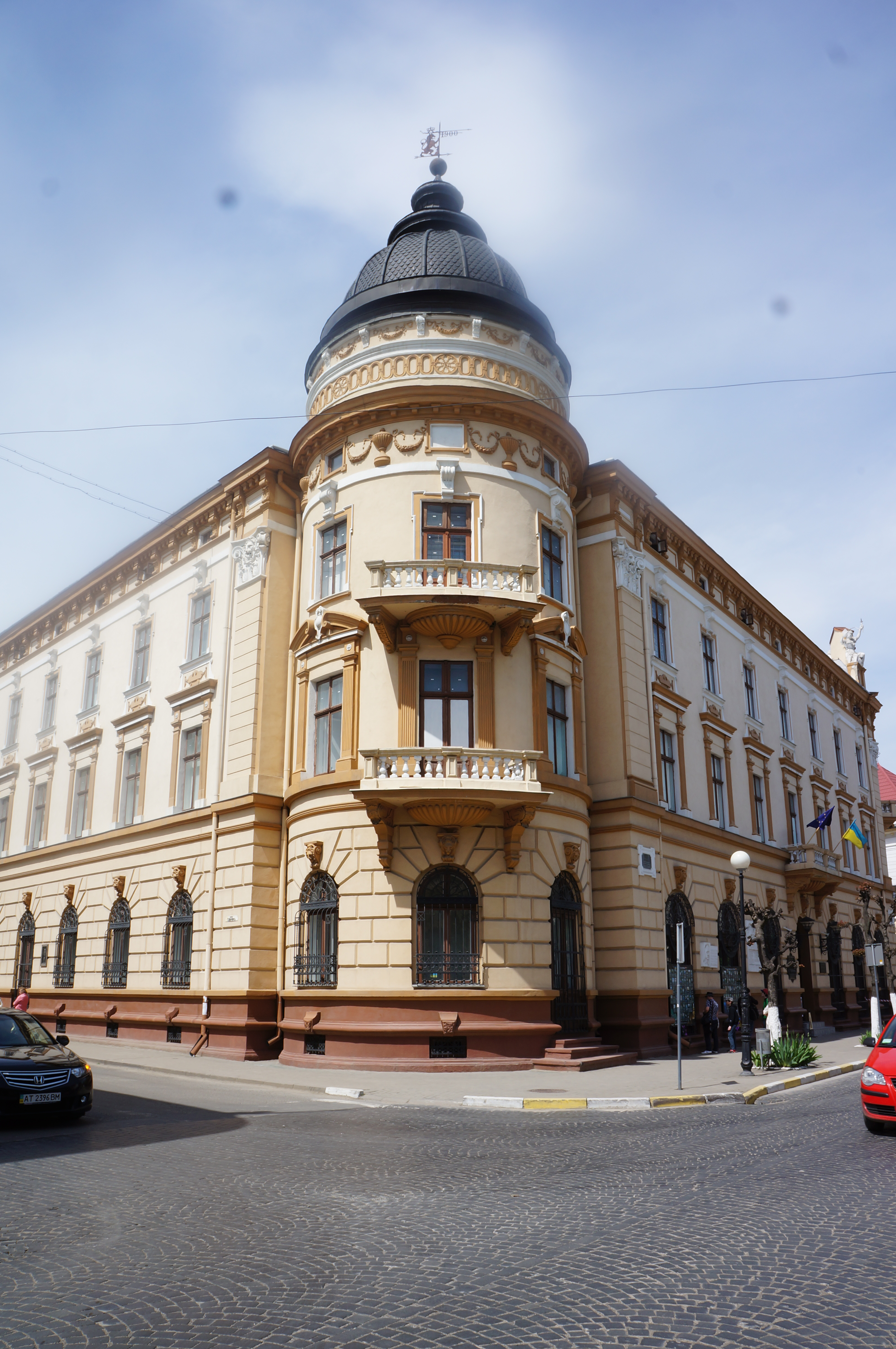
The main museum building.

The Yosafat Kobrynskyi National Museum of Hutsulshchyna and Pokuttia Folk Art (Ukrainian: Національний Музей Народного Мистецтва Гуцульщини та Покуття імені Йосафата Кобринського) is a museum in Kolomyia, Ukraine with a collection of more than 50,000 objects documenting the history and folk culture of Hutsulshchyna and Pokuttia regions.

== History ==
The museum was founded in 1926 and opened to the public in the end of 1934. It is located in the former People's House building in the city center. It is named in honour of Yosafat Kobrynskyi (1818–1901). In 1945, it was entitled the State Museum of Hutsulshchyna Folk Art. Currently, the museum consist of three branches:

- Kosiv Museum of Hutsulshchyna Folk Art and Life (located in Kosiv).
- Museum of Pysanka (located in Kolomyia). Opened in 1987 gathers a collection of more than 12,000 Easter eggs from all over the world.
- Yaremche Museum of Ethnography and Ecology of the Carpathians (in 2007 it joined the main museum in Kolomyia), located in Yaremche. It focuses on organizing festivals, seminars and conferences.

The main exhibition is filled with the objects from Hutsul and Pokuttian villages like: decorated stove tiles, musical instruments, carved wooden tools, furniture, folk costumes, unique Hutsul embroidery, woven wall–hangings and a collection of traditional Hutsul axes.

In the history of Kolomyia there were already a few tries to create a regional museum. First in 1892 a private collector and amateur archeologist Edmund Starzeński (1845–1900) set up a private museum of the Pokuttia Region. It was a collection focused on so called "antiquities" which meant archeological artefacts, but there were also objects of nature as well as ethnographic objects. It was located in his villa and was divided into two parts: the library and the proper museum. Circa 1900 he gave the collection to his son and in 1909 part of it was given to the National Museum in Cracow.

The Museum of Pokuttia Region was revived in June 1913, when Bronisława Starzeńska, after the death of her husband and son, gave the rest of her family collection to the Society of Community School and the museum was open to the public in the rooms of the Peoples' House. The head of the museum was Antoni Sidorowicz. The collection of about 755 ethnographic and historic objects together with a few hundred coins didn't last long. Within the next years it was destroyed in the events of the World War I (first in 1914 and later in 1917). According to the reports from that time there is no evidence of anything saved from that collection.

== Gallery (objects from the museum) ==
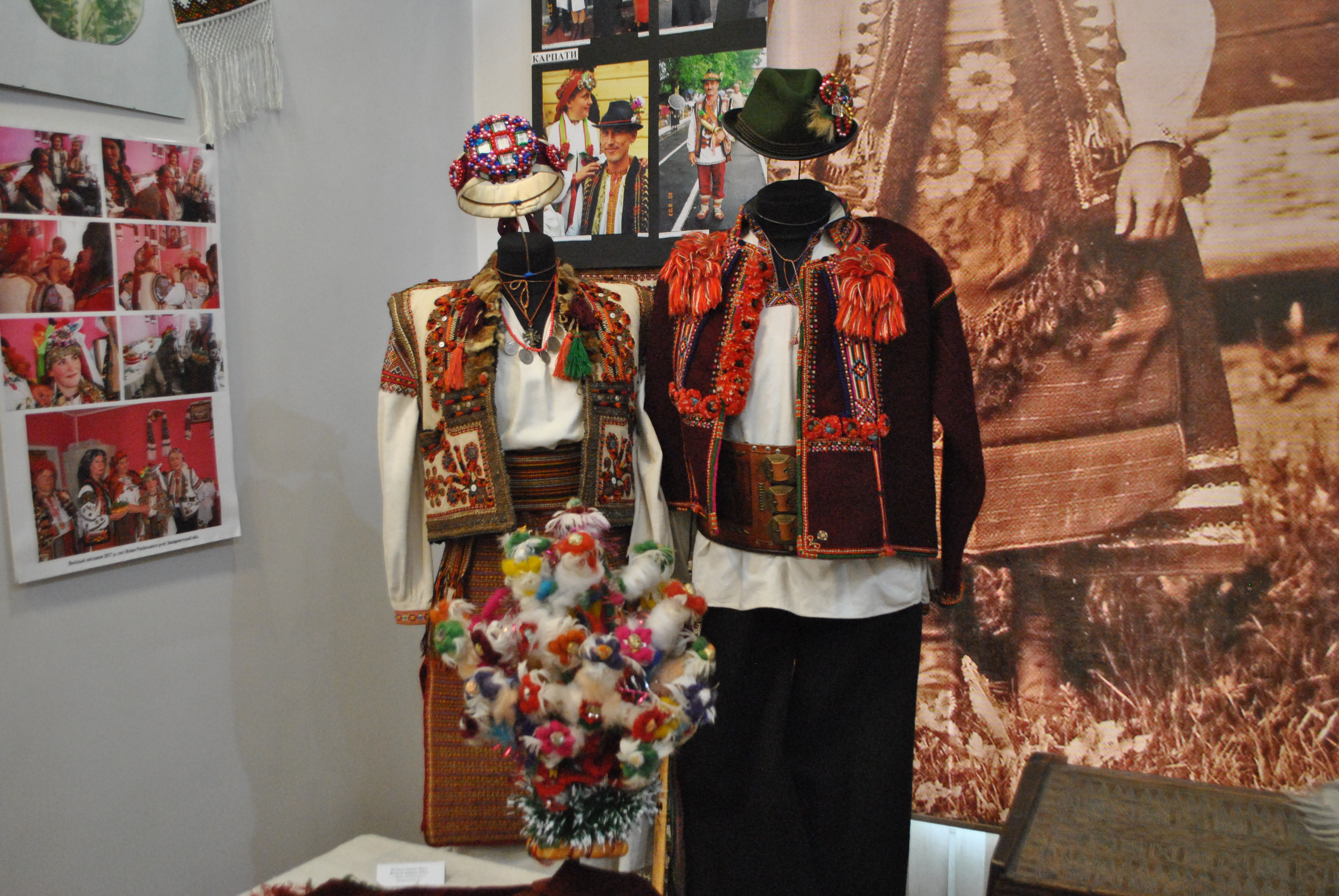
Temporary exhibition of Hutsul wedding.

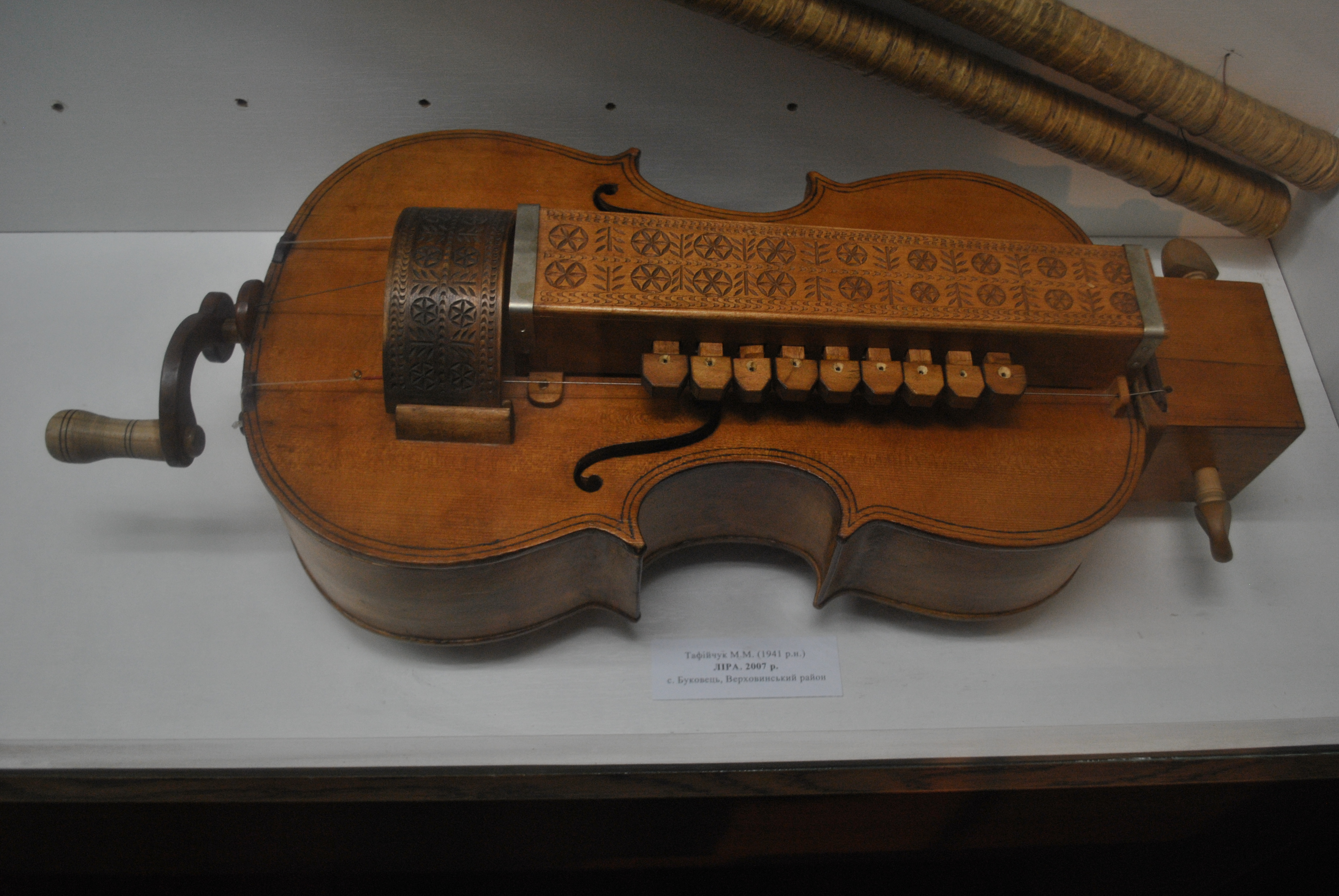
Hurdy-gurdy, 2007

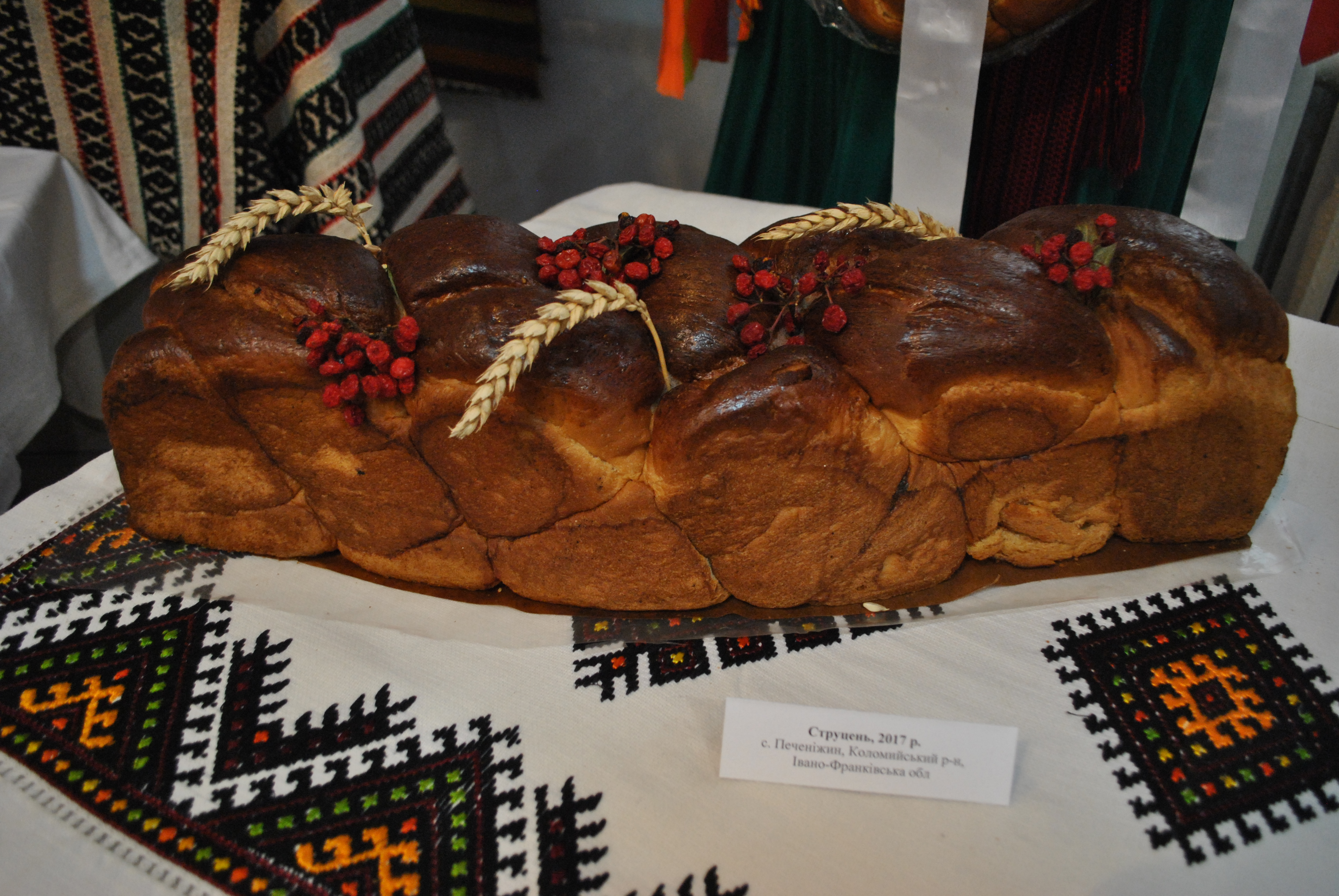
Traditional Hutsul kolach (wedding bread) on the temporary exhibition

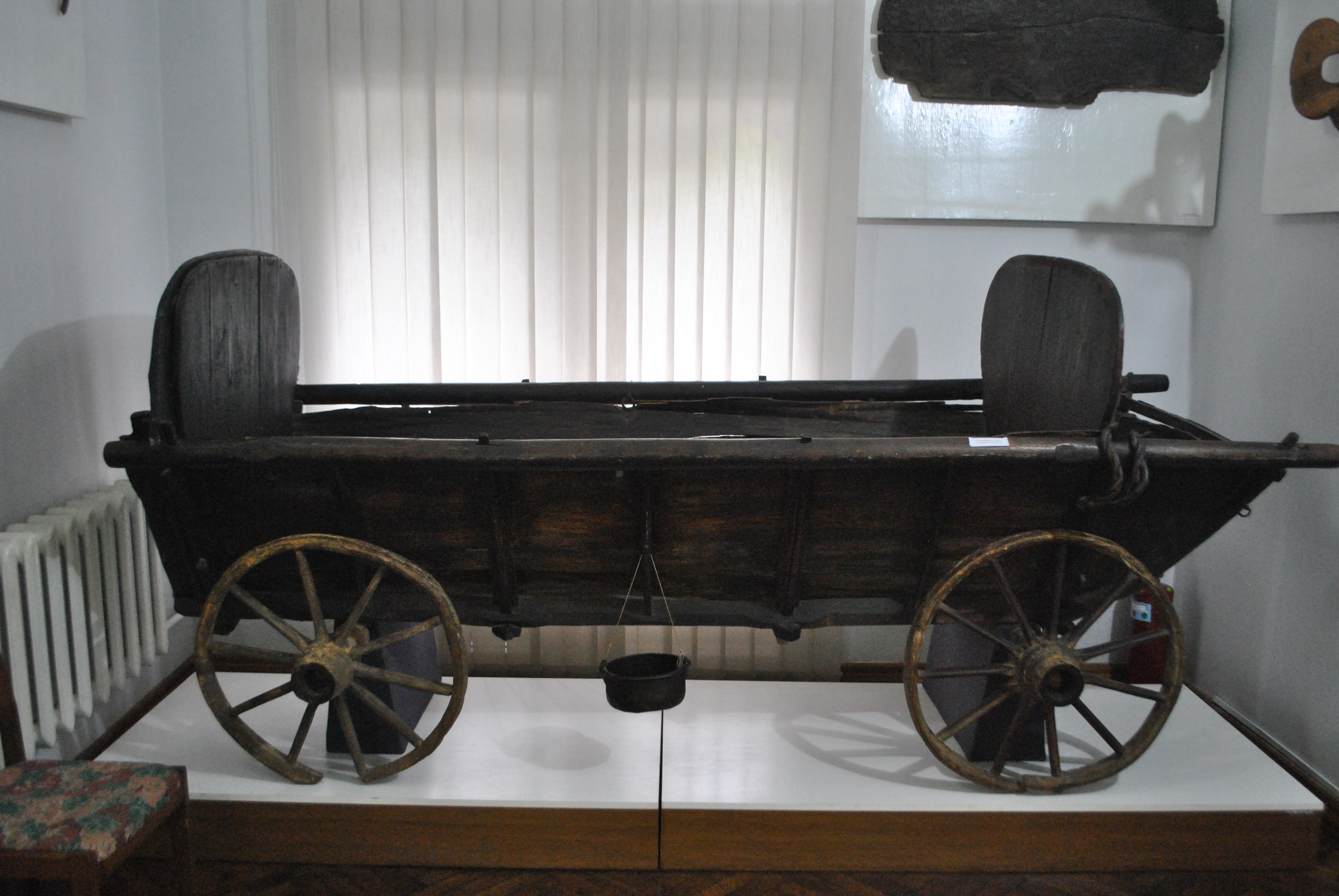
Cart, 18 c,
