= Mykhailo Baraniuk =

Ukrainian folk master of artistic ceramics (1816–1880)

- Михайло Іванович Баранюк
- Born: 1834; Moskalivka, now part of Kosiv, now Ivano-Frankivsk Oblast, Ukraine
- Died: 1902 (aged 67–68); Moskalivka, now part of Kosiv, now Ivano-Frankivsk Oblast, Ukraine
- Occupation: Folk master of artistic ceramics

Mykhailo Baraniuk (Ukrainian: Михайло Іванович Баранюк; 1834, Moskalivka, now part of Kosiv – 1902, same place) was a Ukrainian folk master of artistic ceramics. He was the son of Ivan and the father of Yosyp Baraniuk. He was one of the representatives of the Kosiv school of ceramics.

== Biography ==
He acquired the skills of making pottery from his father, the master Ivan Baraniuk.

The range of Mykhailo Baraniuk's works was typical of Hutsul ceramic art, including plates, bowls, tiles, and candlesticks. His pieces, especially the candlesticks and utilitarian vessels, are distinguished by decoration using the flyandruvannia technique (painting with colored engobes on raw enamel/glaze).

A distinctive feature of Mykhailo Baraniuk's creative manner is the application of a characteristic, brightly expressed pattern and the use of a unique color scheme. He applied designs in brown, green, and yellow onto a white background, with the main elements of the drawing often filled with red engobe ("chervinka") or reddish-brown ("rudka"), which was characteristic only of him and his father, Ivan.

In decorating bowls, Baraniuk used ornamental motifs for the edges, while the bottom was adorned with genre compositions depicting Hutsul life. These subjects included figures of people, animals, and household items. The surface of the ceramic serving dishes was traditionally saturated with various subjects. The paintings covered both sacred themes (depictions of Saint Nicholas the Wonderworker, churches, and bell towers) and scenes from the daily life of the Hutsuls. Furthermore, the master often depicted the animal world: drawings of fish, crayfish, oxen, as well as a cow with a calf, which underscored the connection with nature and the economic structure of the highlanders. The compositions, executed with an incised (sgraffito) outline, are noted for their thoughtfulness, precision of drawing, and a certain static quality of the depicted figures.

Despite the prevalence of ornamentation, the master meticulously drew small traditional motifs such as a rooster, a flowerpot, or a rosette flower in the center of the composition using the sgraffito (incising) technique, combining the techniques of flyandruvannia and rizhkuvannia (applying colored clay/engobe with a special horn/funnel). His bowls are richly decorated with both plant and geometric ornaments.

His works are preserved in the collections of the National Museum of Hutsulshchyna and Pokuttia Folk Art.

== Bibliography ==
- Соломченко О. Г. Народні таланти Прикарпаття. К., 1969.
