= Pysanka Museum =

Museum in Kolomyia, Ukraine

- Музей писанкового розпису
- Established: 23 September 2000
- Coordinates: 48.5283°N 25.0390°E
- Collections: pysanka
- Owner: National Museum of Hutsulshchyna and Pokuttya Folk Art
- Website: pysanka.museum

The Pysanka Museum (Ukrainian: Музей «Писанка», romanized: Muzei 'Pysanka') is a museum of pysanka located in Kolomyia, Ivano-Frankivsk Oblast, Ukraine. It was opened on October 26, 1987. The current Pysanka Museum building was built in 2000 in the western Ukrainian city of Kolomyia, Ivano-Frankivska Oblast. Previously, the pysanka collection had been housed in the Kolomyia church of the Annunciation. The museum is part of the National Museum of Hutsulshchyna and Pokuttya Folk Art.

The central part of the museum is in the shape of a pysanka (Ukrainian Easter egg). This is the only museum in the world dedicated to the pysanka, and it has become a calling card of the city. In August 2007 the museum was recognized as a landmark of modern Ukraine.

The museum was opened in a new building on 23 September 2000, during the 10th International Hutsul festival. Director Yaroslava Tkachuk first came up with the idea of a museum in the shape of a pysanka; local artists Vasyl Andrushko and Myroslav Yasinskyi brought the idea to life. The museum is not only shaped like an egg (14 m in height and 10 m in diameter), but parts of the exterior and inside of the dome are painted to resemble a pysanka.

== Museum collections ==
The museum has a collection of over 10,000 pysanky. The permanent collection includes pysanky from the majority of the oblasts of Ukraine. Many are modern re-creations of traditional designs, including a recreation by Oksana Bilous and Zoya Stashuk of the Skarzhynska collection (as depicted by Kulzhynsky), but there is also a fine collection of older pysanky from the Ivano-Frankivsk region that date from the 19th and 20th centuries.

There are many examples of both pysanky and other forms of decorated eggs from other Slavic countries (Belarus, the Czech Republic, Poland) and more distant lands (Romania, Sweden, United States, Canada, France, Pakistan, Sri Lanka, India).

The museum also presents temporary exhibitions in its galleries, usually collections of folk or original pysanky by local pysankary. Other exhibits are usually related to the pysanka and Hutsul Easter traditions, but can also encompass other folk arts.

Another special collection at the museum are pysanky decorated with hand-signatures by all Ukrainian presidents and most of the First Ladies, and by foreign politicians who visited the museum.

== Gallery ==

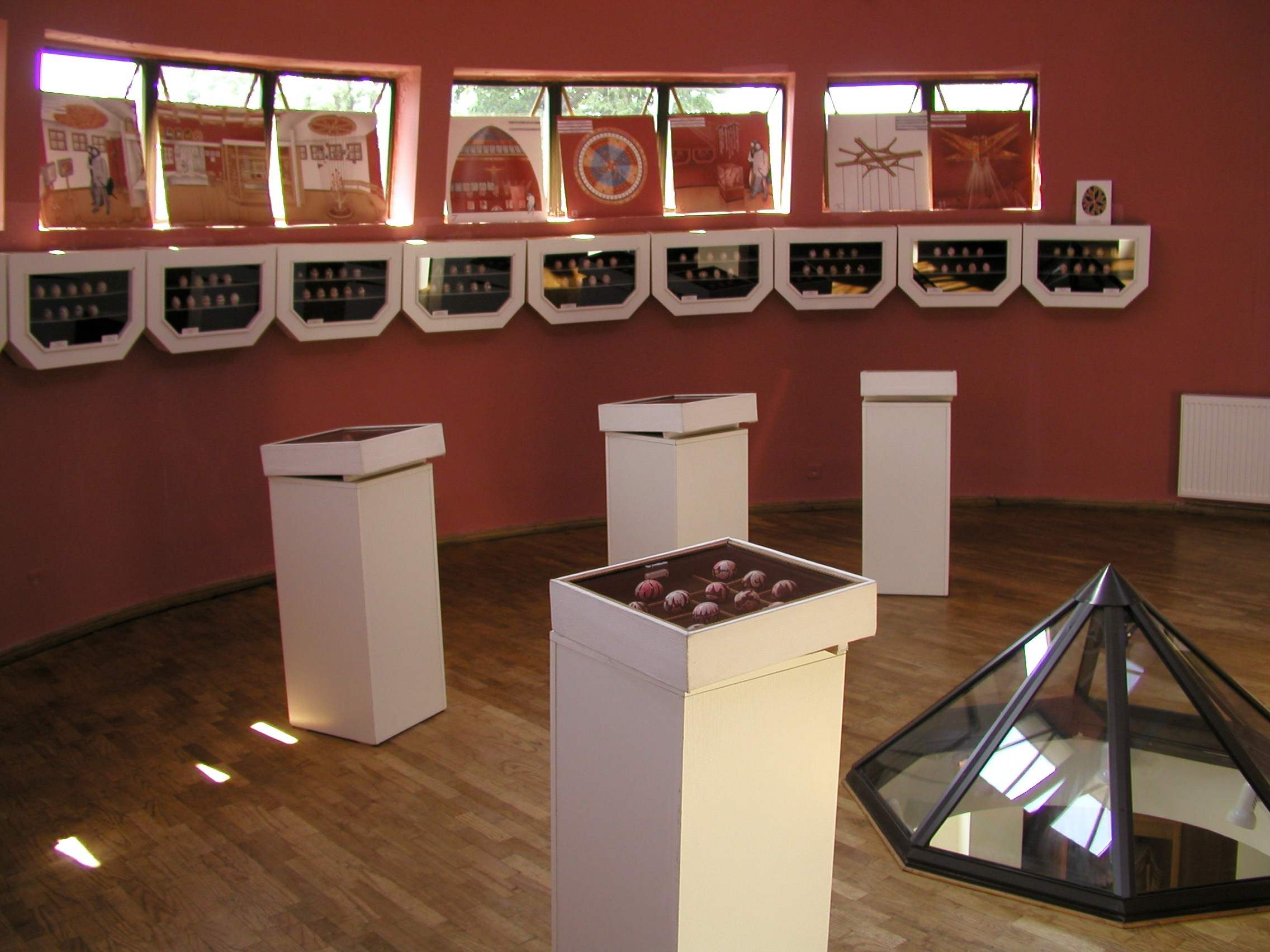

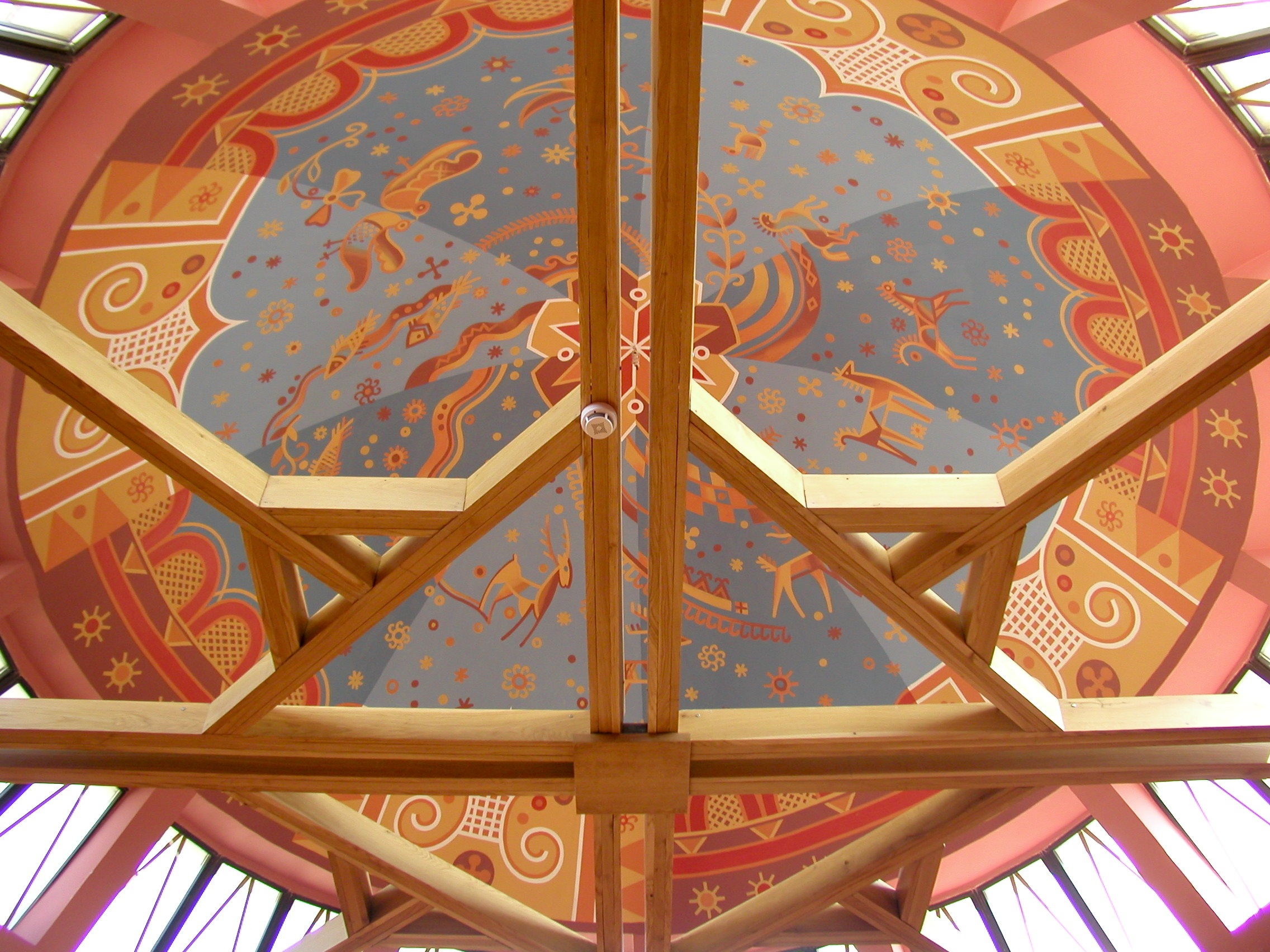

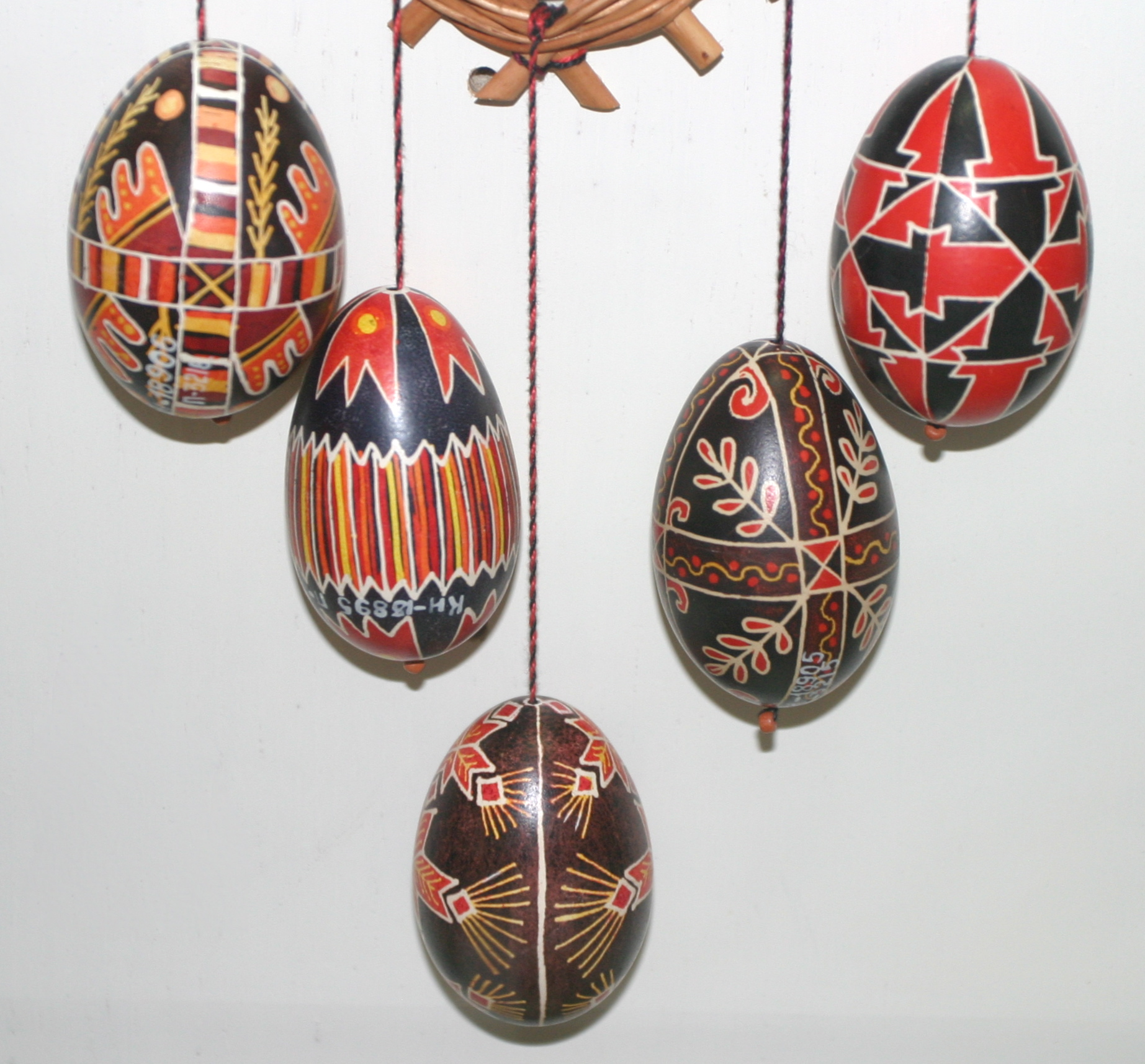

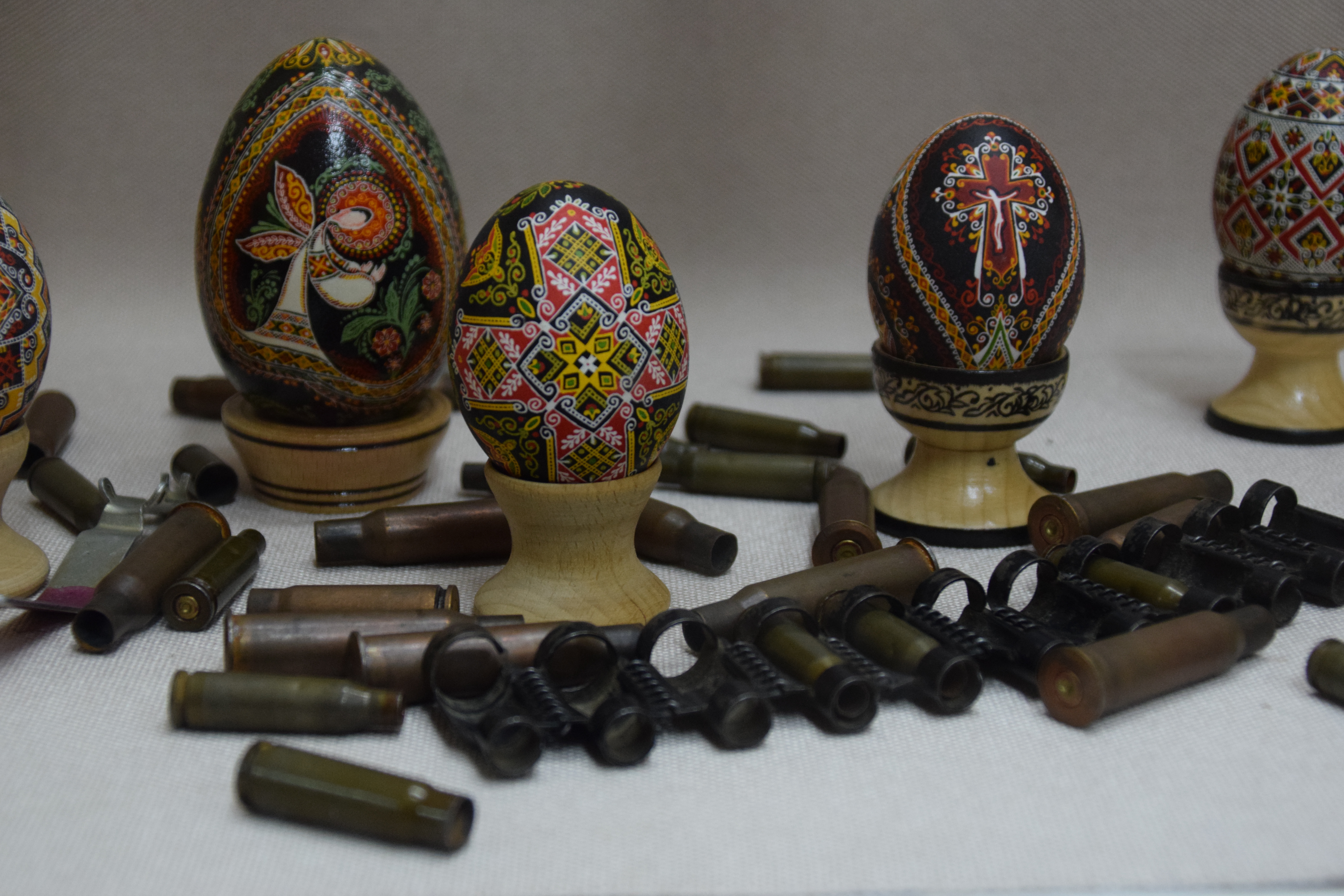

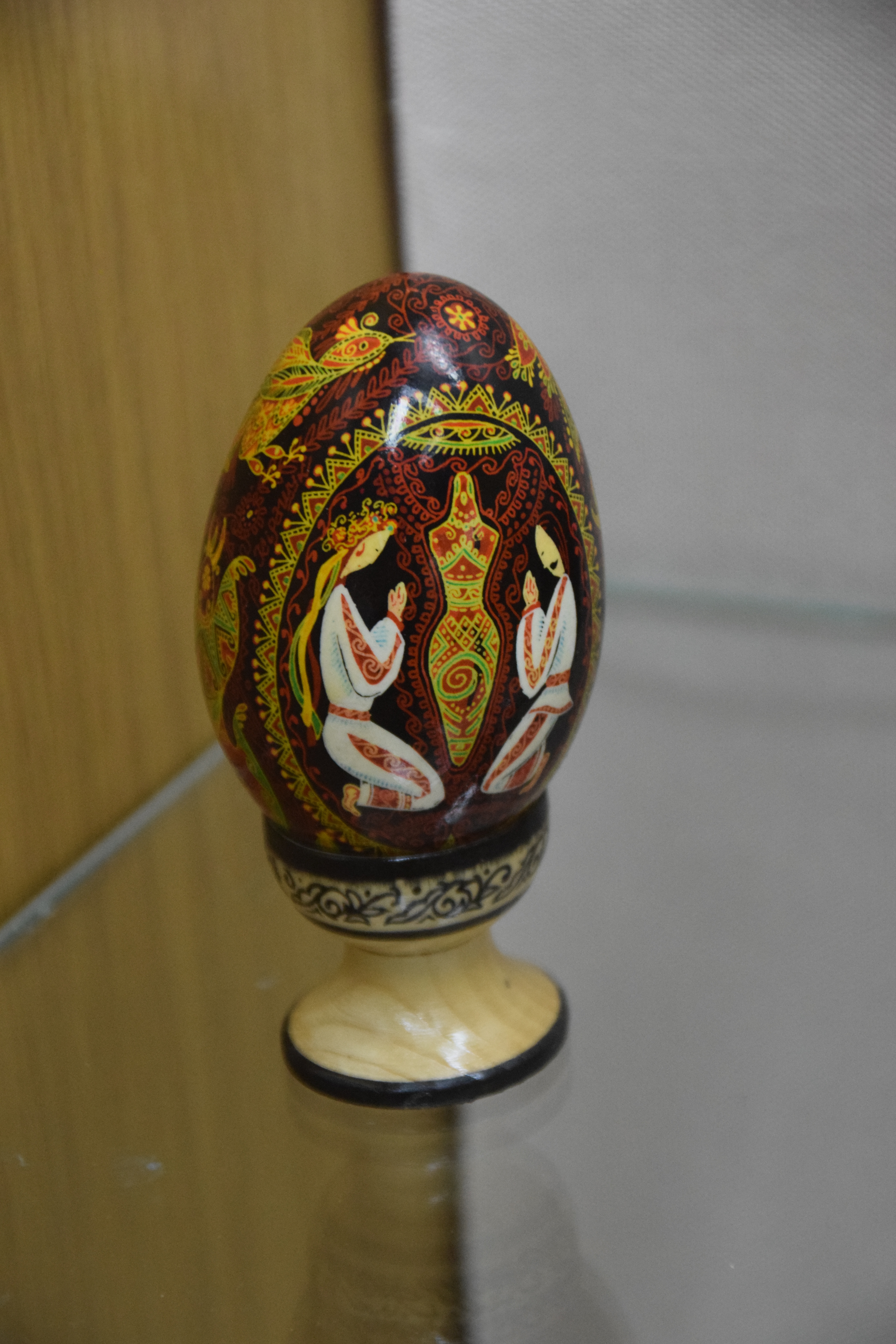

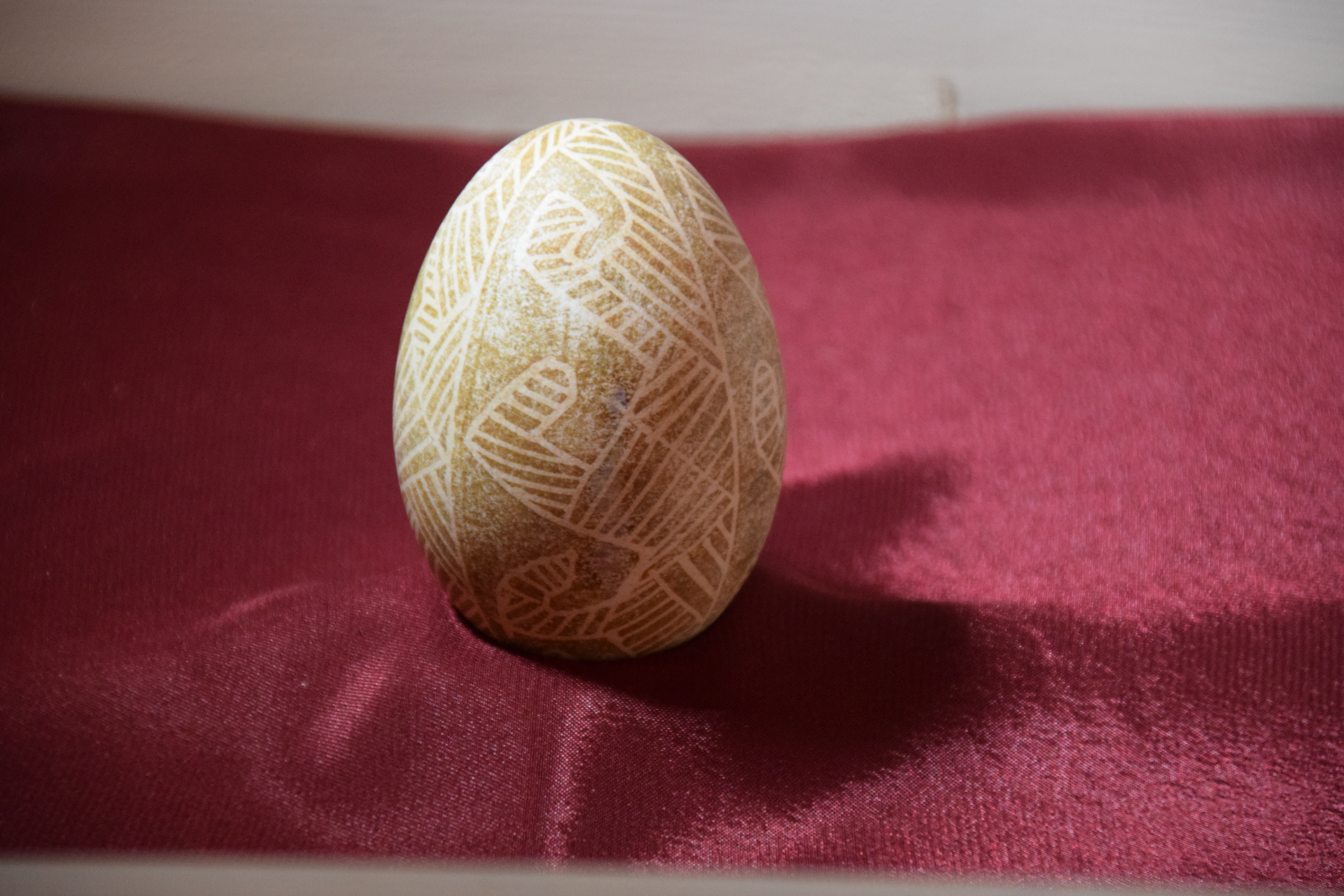
Replica of the oldest pysanka in Ukraine

== See also ==
- Pysanka
- National Museum of Hutsulshchyna and Pokuttia Folk Art
- Seven Wonders of Ukraine
