= Kosov (Šumperk District) =

- Municipality
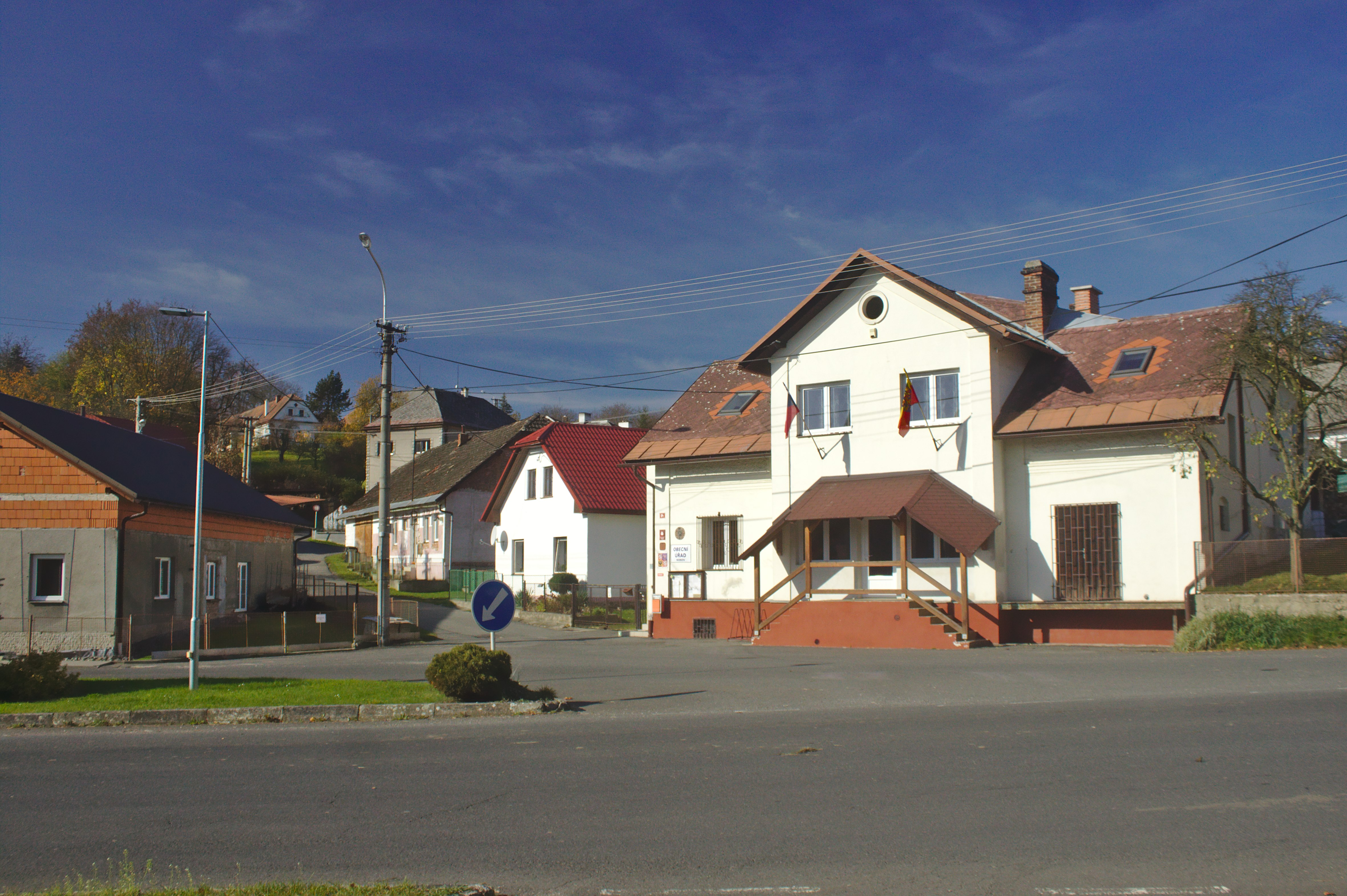
- Municipal office

- Location in the Czech Republic
- Coordinates: 49°52′59″N 16°47′56″E
- Country: Czech Republic
- Region: Olomouc
- District: Šumperk
- First mentioned: 1360

Area
  - Total: 5.47 km^{2} (2.11 sq mi)
- Elevation: 404 m (1,325 ft)

Population (2026-01-01)
  - Total: 321
  - Density: 58.7/km^{2} (152/sq mi)
- Time zone: UTC+1 (CET)
  - Summer (DST): UTC+2 (CEST)
- Postal codes: 789 01
- Website: obeckosov.webnode.cz

Kosov is a municipality and village in Šumperk District in the Olomouc Region of the Czech Republic. It has about 300 inhabitants.

Kosov lies approximately 16 kilometres (10 mi) south-west of Šumperk, 46 km (29 mi) north-west of Olomouc, and 173 km (107 mi) east of Prague.

== Demographics ==
Historical population
Year	Pop.	±%
1869	485	—
1880	471	−2.9%
1890	486	+3.2%
1900	505	+3.9%
1910	532	+5.3%
1921	503	−5.5%
1930	526	+4.6%
1950	374	−28.9%
1961	411	+9.9%
1970	339	−17.5%
1980	290	−14.5%
1991	278	−4.1%
2001	283	+1.8%
2011	348	+23.0%
2021	299	−14.1%
Source: Censuses
