= Kosov (surname) =

Kosov (Russian: Косов) is a Russian masculine surname, its feminine counterpart is Kosova. It may refer to

- Anatoly Kosov (1927–1995), Soviet naval officer
- Dmitry Kosov (born 1968), Russian sprinter
- Ivan Kosov (born 1999), Russian football player
- Leo Kosov-Meyer, fictional character from the Australian TV drama Sea Patrol
- Sergei Kosov (born 1986), Russian football player
- Yaroslav Kosov (born 1993), Russian ice hockey player

== See also ==
- Kosova (disambiguation)
