= UkrLandFarming =

UkrLandFarming is a Ukrainian agricultural company, registered in Cyprus founded in 2007 by Oleg Bakhmatyuk, and as of 2022, one of the largest in the country. Controlling 670,000 hectares (1,700,000 acres) it is also the world's eighth largest company when measured by the acreage of controlled agricultural land. It is considered one of the largest and most successful Ukrainian companies.

Like many other Ukrainian businesses, the company reported major damages during the Russian invasion of Ukraine in 2022. Before the war, the company portfolio included Europe's largest egg farm.

In 2017–2018, UkrLandFarming hired independent reputable financial experts to analyze the possibility of servicing credit obligations. The analysis showed the need to discount foreign currency debt at 50% with the payment of other liabilities over the next 10 years. The company has started comprehensive negotiations on restructuring credit obligations with most Ukrainian and foreign creditors. Co-owner of the company and its CEO Oleh Bakhmatyuk addresses the National Bank of Ukraine with the Deposit Guarantee Fund of individuals with a proposal to restructure loans UkrLandFarming Group, as well as other debt related to the activities of VAB and Financial Initiative.

At the beginning of 2019, the agricultural holding invested ₴2 million in new equipment for compound feed production of JV Vesna 21 LLC.
