= Oleg Bakhmatiuk =

Ukrainian businessman and politician

- Олег Бахматюк
- Born: August 14, 1974 (age 52); Ivano-Frankivsk, Ukraine
- Citizenship: Ukraine
- Education: Master's degree
- Alma mater: Ivano-Frankivsk National Technical University of Oil and Gas; Chernivtsi Economics and Law Institute
- Occupation: Entrepreneur
- Organization: UkrLandFarming

Oleg Bakhmatiuk (Ukrainian: Олег Бахматюк, born August 14, 1974) is a Ukrainian entrepreneur, former billionaire. He is the owner of the agricultural vertically integrated company UkrLandFarming and one of the largest egg producers in both Europe and Asia.

== Early life and education ==
In 1996, Bakhmatiuk graduated from the Chernivtsi Economics and Law Institute, where he specialized in management of the production sphere. In 2005, he graduated from the Ivano-Frankivsk National Technical University of Oil and Gas, with specialist diplomas in management and engineering physics.

== Career and business activity ==
Between 1996 and 2001, Bakhmatiuk worked in various positions at KGD, representing the Itera company in the Ivano-Frankivsk Region.

In the 2002 Ukrainian local elections, he was elected Deputy of the Ivano-Frankivsk City Council. There, he became a member of the Economic Revival Faction and the City Council Committee on finance planning, prices, and budget.

Between 2002 and 2004, Bakhmatiuk partnered with Ihor Yeremeyev in oil, agribusiness, and regional gasification ventures. In 2003, he founded Stanislavska Torgova Kompaniya (Stanislavskiy Trade Company), which grew to become the largest grocery store chain in the Ivano-Frankivsk Region under the brand “Favorit.” The company was sold in 2010 to pay debts to its competitor Pakko-Holding.

In 2004, Bakhmatiuk founded the commercial bank Financial Initiative.

In 2006, he acquired controlling stakes in several regional gas distribution companies — Ivano-FrankivskGas, LvivGas, ZKGas, ChernivtsiGas, and VolynGas. These stakes were later sold to Dmytro Firtash's RosUkrEnergo AG in 2007.

In 2011, he acquired a stake in VAB Bank. Due to the banking crisis in Ukraine during 2014–2015, VAB Bank was withdrawn from the market by the National Bank of Ukraine, along with 99 other banks. Bakhmatiuk remains the only former bank owner who proposed covering debts to the Deposit Guarantee Fund and the NBU.

== Agricultural sector ==
The main focus of Bakhmatiuk's business is agriculture. In 2003, he founded AvangardCo Investments Public Limited by acquiring underperforming agricultural assets. He was chairman from 2010 to 2013, then stepped down in favor of his sister and CEO, Nataliya Vasylyuk, remaining on the board. He returned as chairman in 2016 and has held the position since then.

=== UkrLandFarming PLC ===
UkrLandFarming PLC founded by Oleg Bakhmatiuk in 2007, is the holding company for his extensive agricultural assets, including AvangardCo Investments Public Limited. Since 2010, Bakhmatiuk has been chairman and CEO of the company. It was incorporated in Cyprus in 2008 as a public limited company and listed on the London Stock Exchange in 2010 through Global Depositary Receipts.

UkrLandFarming is one of the world's largest vertically integrated agricultural operators and land cultivators. As of June 2019, the group included 135 agricultural entities managing a land bank of approximately 508,000 hectares. Its production infrastructure spans the entire value chain: 5 seed plants, 16 modern grain silos, 216 horizontal storage facilities, 5 customs-bonded warehouses, 5 sugar plants, 2 sugar silos, 19 meat plants, 2 leather plants, 1 transportation company, 24 distribution centers for domestic and international trade, 32 poultry facilities (including 19 egg-laying farms, 3 pullet-rearing farms, and 3 breeding farms), 6 fodder mills, 3 long-term egg storage facilities, 1 egg product processing plant, and 1 mining and chemical production company.

The group specializes in crop farming and trading, seed production, livestock breeding, milk and sugar production, meat processing, and the distribution of agricultural machinery, fertilizers, and crop protection products. As of February 2022, the infrastructure figures remained consistent, reaffirming its large-scale integrated model.

UkrLandFarming was listed among the Top 20 most successful investors in Ukraine by InVenture and manages over 470,000 hectares across 22 regions, exporting to more than 40 countries worldwide.

In 2018, UkrLandFarming PLC was recognized as one of the top employers in Ukraine's agricultural sector. The company was listed among the top three agricultural employers in a ranking compiled by Focus.ua, informed by a Korn Ferry survey.

Additionally, UkrLandFarming was acknowledged for its resilience and continued operations despite financial challenges. In 2018, the company maintained full production and expanded its export focus. Notably, it made its first egg deliveries to Hong Kong in 2018.

As of 2022, the group reported that approximately 400 companies operate under the UkrLandFarming PLC brand.

In January 2014, Cargill acquired a 5% stake in UkrLandFarming PLC for $200 million, valuing the company at approximately $4 billion.

=== AvangardCo IPL ===
AvangardCo IPL, the largest subsidiary of UkrLandFarming PLC, is one of Ukraine's largest agro-industrial companies and among the world's leading egg producers. Founded in 2003 with its headquarters in Kyiv, the company is vertically integrated, covering the full production cycle — from feed mills, hatcheries, pullet-rearing and laying hen farms, and two full-cycle poultry complexes to long-term storage facilities, the Imperovo Foods egg processing plant, and a biogas facility. AvangardCo maintains one of Europe's largest laying hen populations and operates modern facilities across Ukraine, adhering to strict biosecurity protocols and high product quality standards. Domestically, it distributes products through supermarket chains, retail stores, wholesale buyers, and industrial clients, including under the “Kvochka” brand. Internationally, it is the largest Ukrainian exporter of eggs and dried egg products, supplying over 40 countries across the EU, Middle East, Africa, and Asia. In 2007, the company was incorporated in Cyprus as Ultrainvest Limited and re-registered in 2009 as AvangardCo Investments Public Limited. In 2010, it listed 22.5% of its shares on the London Stock Exchange via Global Depositary Receipts valued at $208 million. It was delisted in November 2023, at which time UkrLandFarming retained a 77.5% ownership stake. Bakhmatiuk, the company's founder, is chairman of the board.

In February 2018, the Avis poultry complex, part of Avangard agroholding, received official EU approval to export Class A table eggs.

== Asset losses due to war ==
Between 2014 and 2015, Bakhmatiuk's businesses experienced major losses due to the annexation of Crimea and the war in Donetsk and Luhansk regions.

In 2022, the Chornobaivka Poultry Farm, the largest in Europe and part of Avangard, was destroyed by Russian forces. Estimated losses reached UAH 12 billion ($330 million).

Bakhmatiuk is preparing to file a lawsuit against the Russian Federation to recover over $1 billion in damages related to these losses.
