= Kosiv =

Urban locality in Ivano-Frankivsk Oblast, Ukraine

Kosiv Косів Kosów
- City
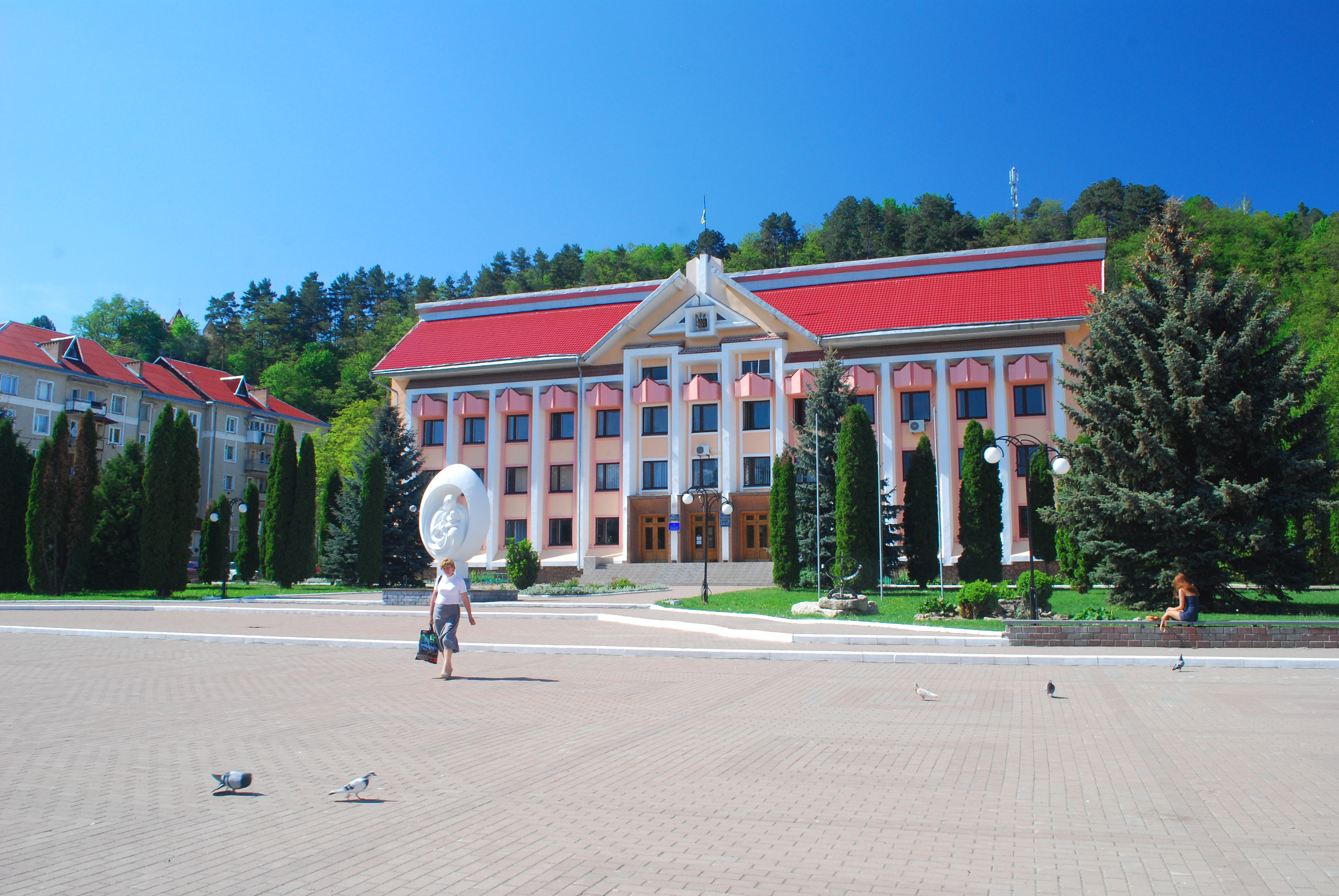
- Town Hall

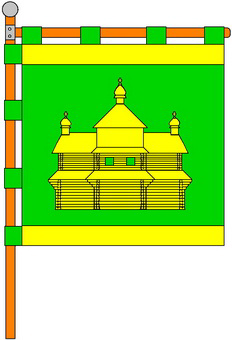
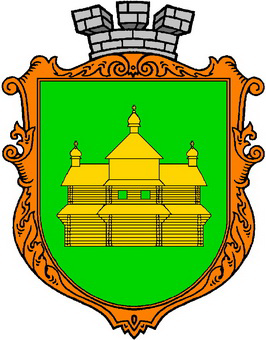
- Flag Seal
- Interactive map of Kosiv
- Location of Kosiv in Ukraine Kosiv (Ukraine)
- Coordinates: 48°18′54″N 25°05′43″E
- Country: Ukraine
- Oblast: Ivano-Frankivsk Oblast
- Raion: Kosiv Raion
- Hromada: Kosiv urban hromada

Population (2022)
  - Total: 8,351
- Website: kosivmr.if.ua

Kosiv (Ukrainian: Косів, IPA: [ˈkɔs⁽ʲ⁾iu̯]; Polish: Kosów) is a city located in Ivano-Frankivsk Oblast, in western Ukraine. It is the administrative center of Kosiv Raion (district). Kosiv hosts the administration of Kosiv urban hromada, one of the hromadas of Ukraine. Population: 8,351 (2022 estimate). Its distinctive ceramics were inscribed to UNESCO's Intangible Cultural Heritage List in 2021.

== Names ==
Ukrainian: Косiв, German: Kossow, Polish: Kosów, Romanian: Cosău, Yiddish: קאסאוו. From 1918 to 1945, the town, which at that time was part of the Second Polish Republic, was officially called Kosów Huculski.

== History ==
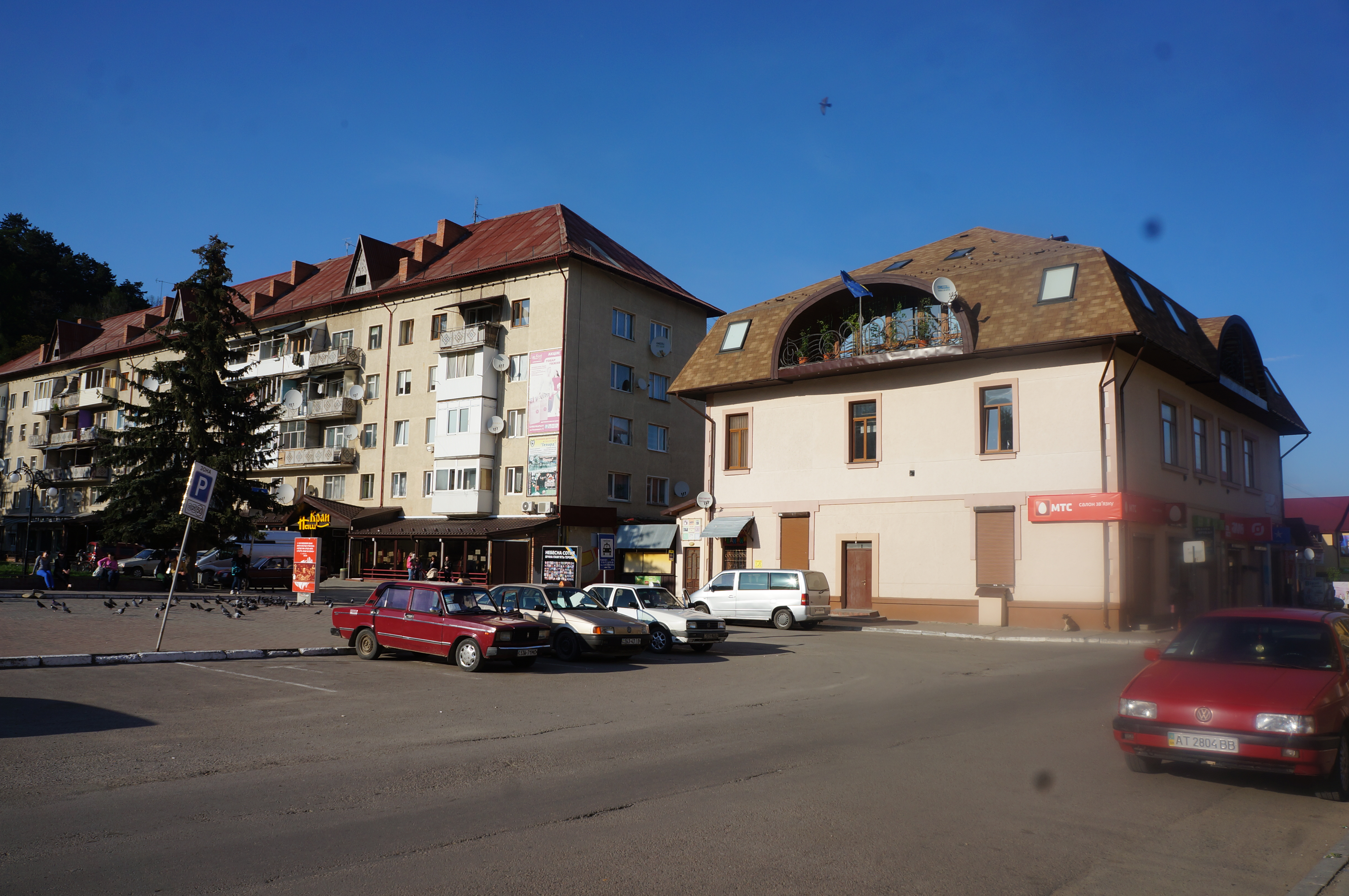
Kosiv main square

Initially, a small Hutsul settlement with the remnants of a small castle destroyed by the Turks, Kosiv was founded on the Ribnica (river). The first written mention of it is in the Grant Charter of Lithuanian Duke Svitrigaila in 1424. At that time, the village was in the territory of what is today Old Kosiv. In 1565, not far from modern-day Kosiv, Starosta of Sniatyn, Tenczynski founded a town named Rukiv (Polish: Rukow). Polish Crown Hetman Jerzy Jazlowiecki, the owner of Kuty, later destroyed it. Some years later, the town was recovered and named Kosiv (the earlier village of this name thus became Old Kosiv). Until 1772, Kosiv/Kosów was under Polish control.

As a result of the first of Partitions of Poland (Treaty of St. Petersburg dated 5 July 1772), Kosiv was attributed to the Habsburg Empire, as part of Austrian Galicia.

Since 1867, Kosiv was the administrative center of the Kossow Bezirkshauptmannschaft (Austrian name of the district). In 1919, after the Great War, the area returned to Poland and was turned into a powiat seat within the Stanisławów Voivodship. In the Second Polish Republic, Kosów emerged as one of the most popular spas. The Kosów spa was founded in 1891 by doctor Apolinary Tarnawski. Here, in 1911, one of the first units of the Polish Scouting and Guiding Association was created by Kazimierz and Witold Lutosławski, and Olga Drohnowska. Kosów Huculski, as it was called, attracted top names of the interbellum Poland. The spa was visited, among others, by Roman Dmowski, Ignacy Daszynski, Wojciech Korfanty, Gabriela Zapolska, Juliusz Osterwa, Maria Dabrowska, Melchior Wankowicz, Xawery Dunikowski, Karol Adwentowicz, Leon Schiller, Stanisław Dygat, Jozef Pankiewicz, and Lucjan Rydel.

In 1939, Kosów Huculski became part of the Union of Soviet Socialist Republics (USSR) as a result of the Molotov–Ribbentrop Pact and the Invasion of Poland. Here, in September 1939, the government of Poland crossed the Romanian border. Despite this pact, Kosiv was occupied by Nazi Germany from July 1, 1941, until April 2, 1944. After that time it was, again, a member of the Soviet Union, until the independence of Ukraine in 1991.

At the beginning of World War II, around 3700 Jews lived in Kosiv. In October, 1941, the German security police, leading on Pidzamche street to the so-called "Town Mountain", rounded up and shot more than 2000 Jews, burning them in mass grave. In April 1942, the authorities forced 1000 Jews to move to Kolomyja, though some returned to Kosiv. In September, most of the remaining Jews in Kosiv were rounded up. Some were shot in Kosiv, 500 were sent to prison, and the rest sent to Kolomyja and from there to Belzec where they were immediately murdered. In October and November, the Jews left behind and in hiding were murdered in Kosiv. About 100 Kosiv Jews survived, some hiding with sympathetic local inhabitants, others by fleeing the area.

The distinctive painted ceramics from Kosiv originated in the 1700s and reflect the history and culture of Hutsul people. They were inscribed to UNESCO's list of Intangible Cultural Heritage in 2021.

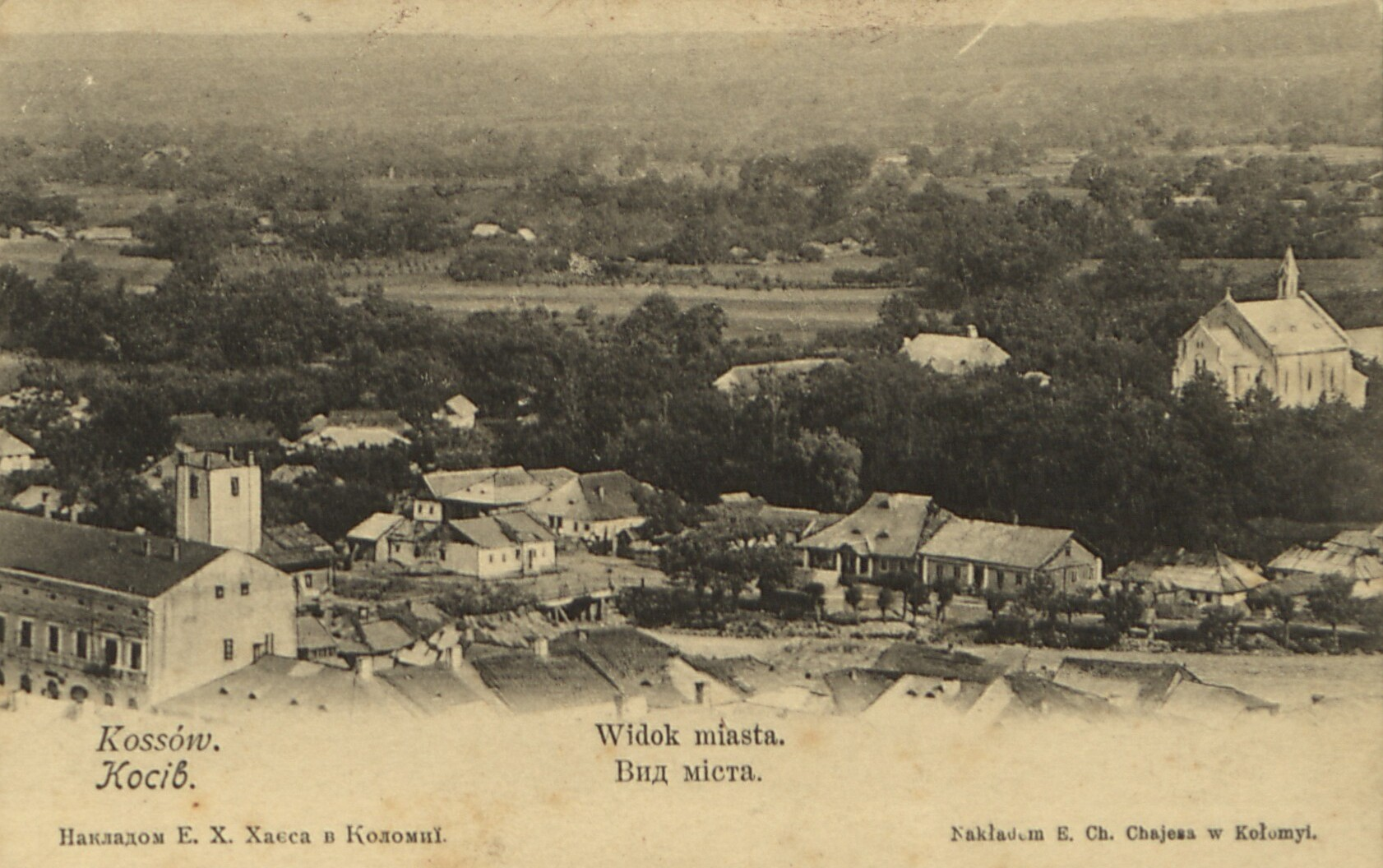
View of the city, before 1906

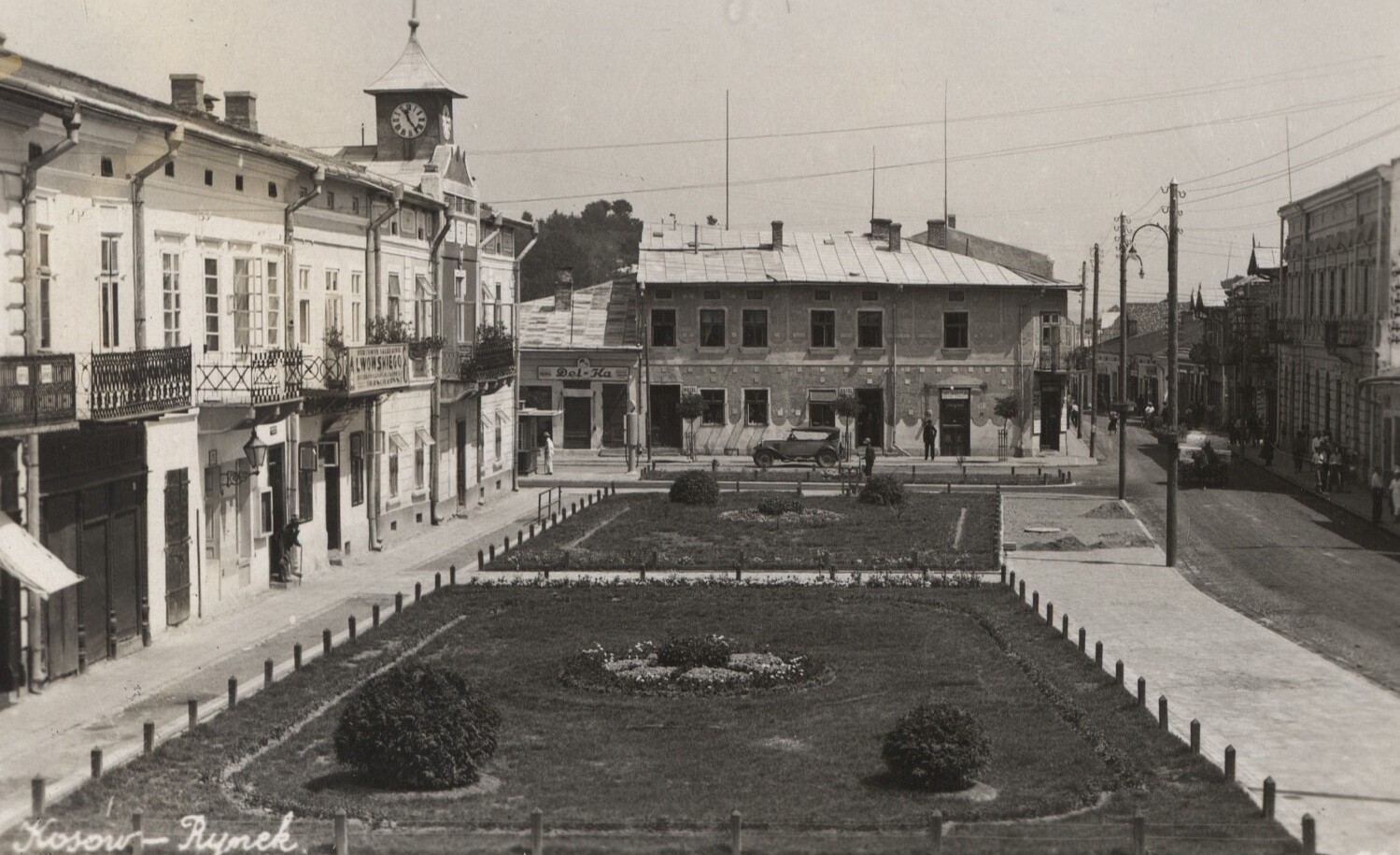
Market Square, 1939

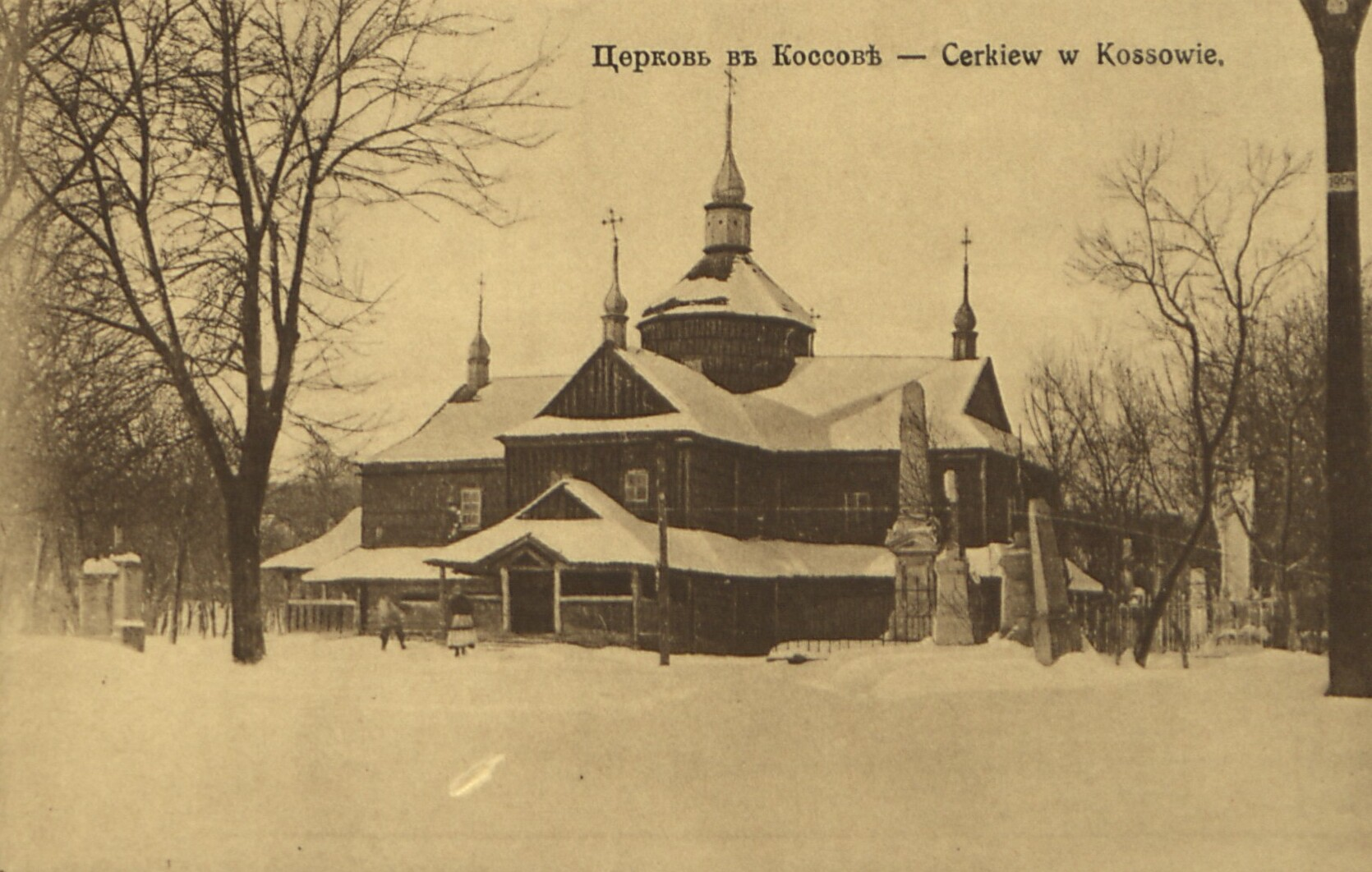
Orthodox church, circa 1913

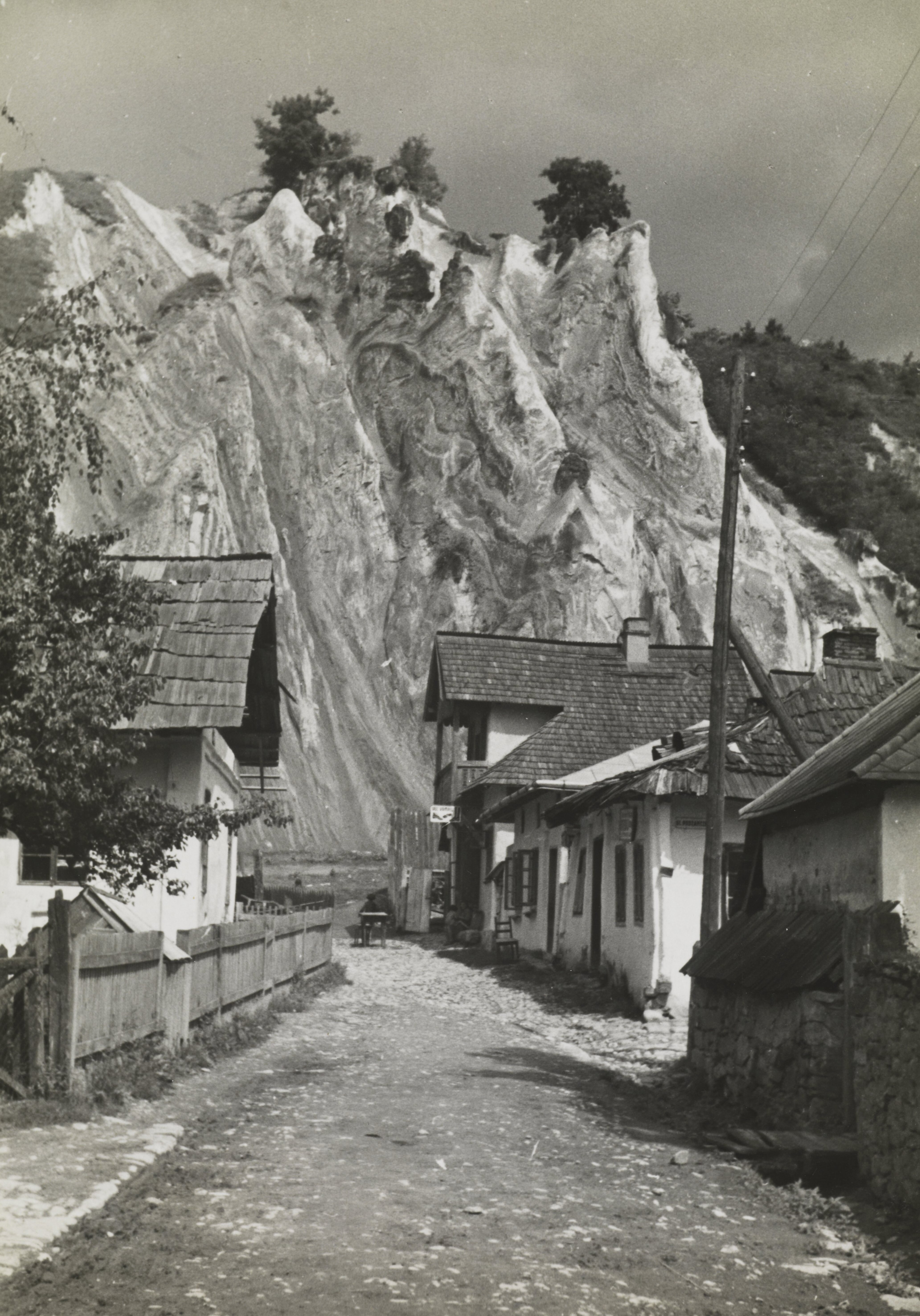
Old houses under Castle Hill, before 1939

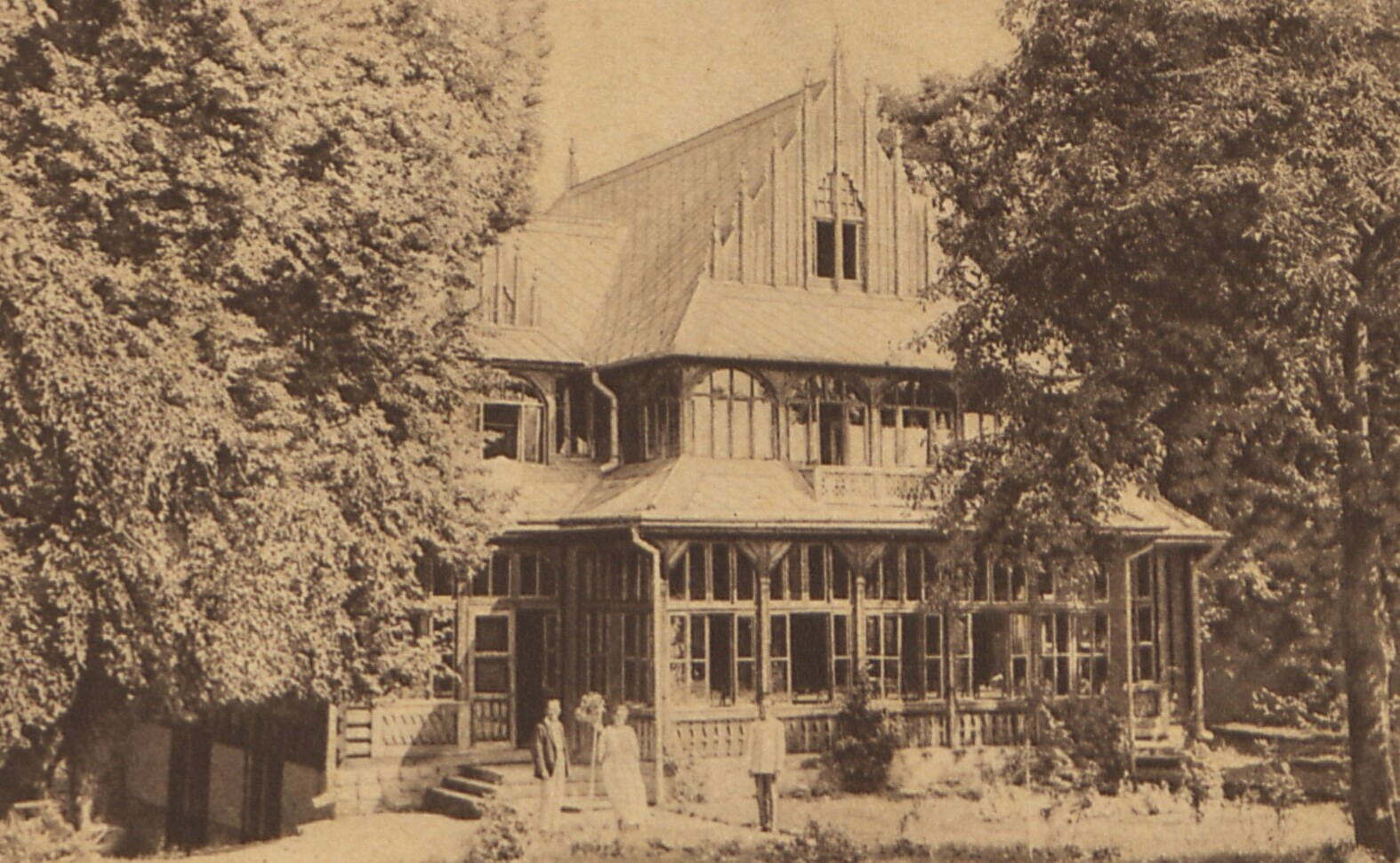
Dr. Tarnawski's clinic, circa 1930

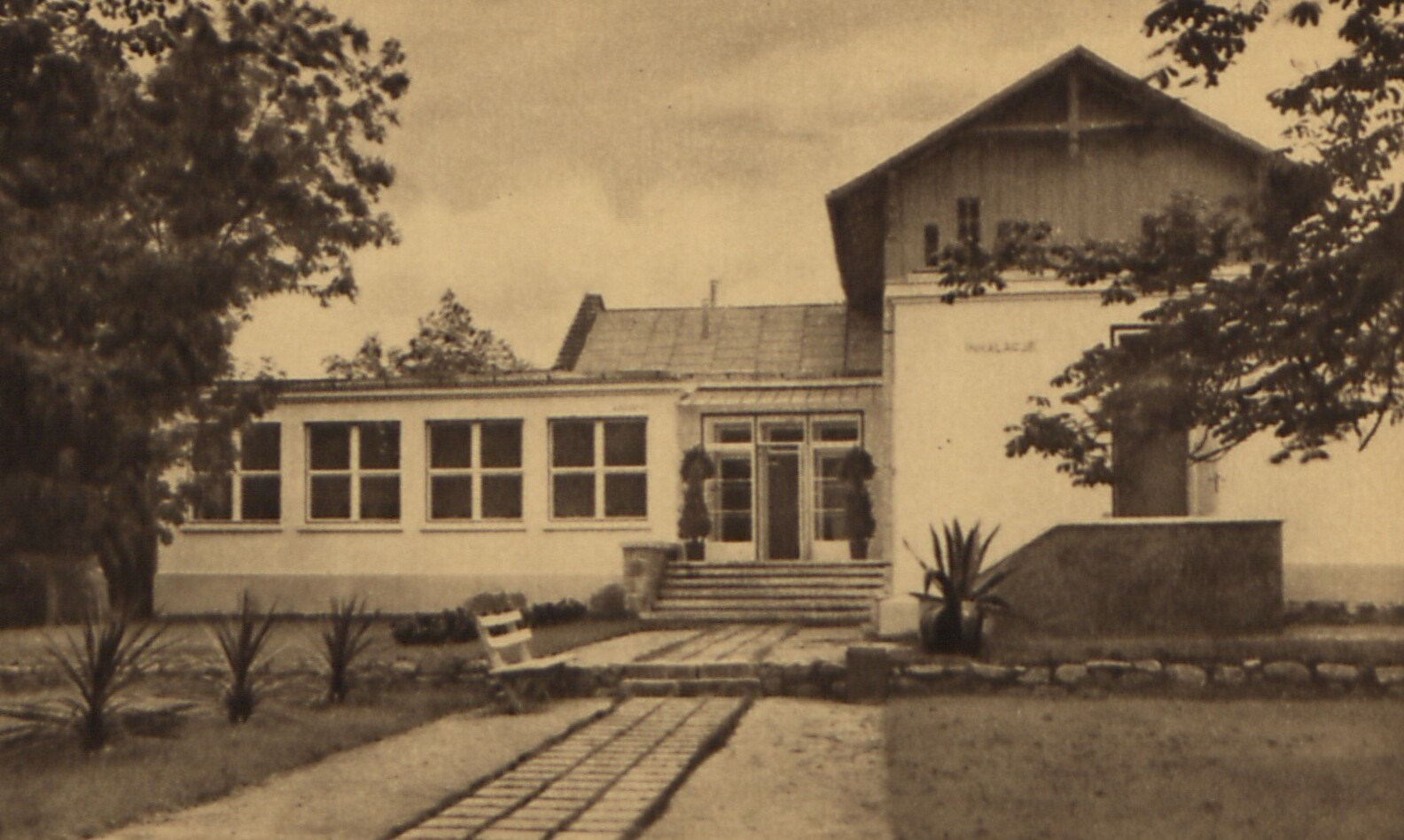
Inhalation room and bathrooms, circa 1930

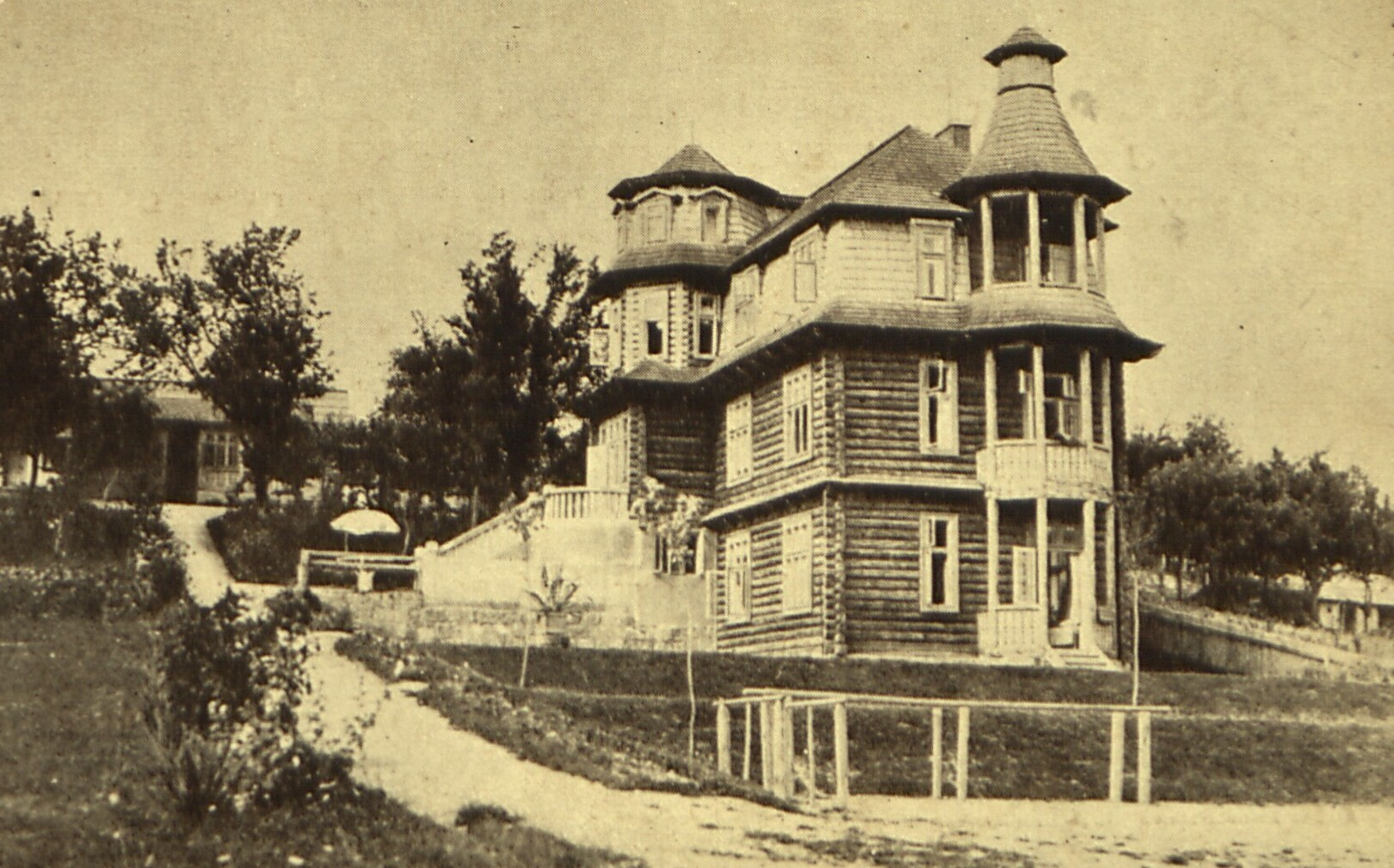
Medical spa, circa 1930

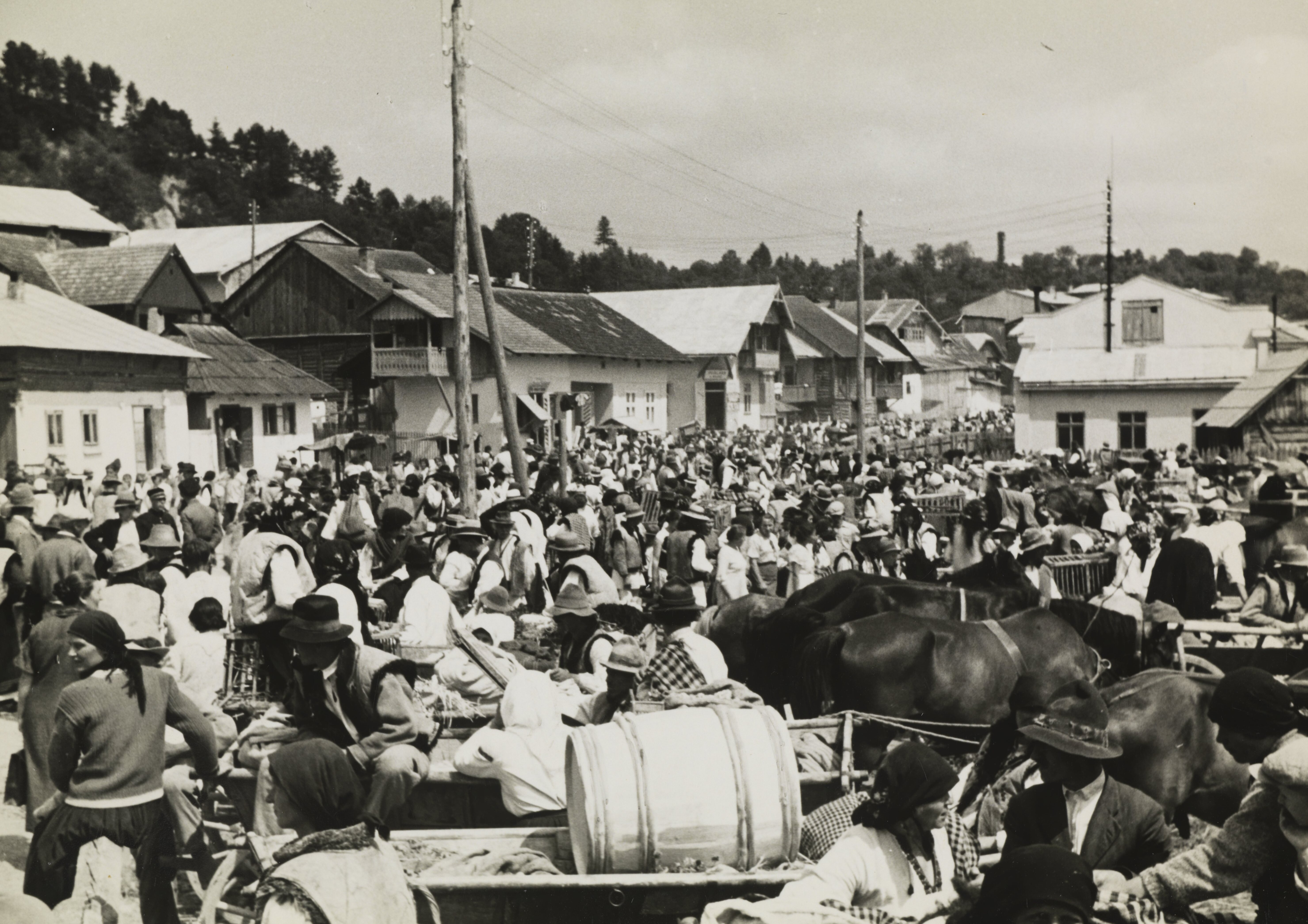
Fair, before 1939

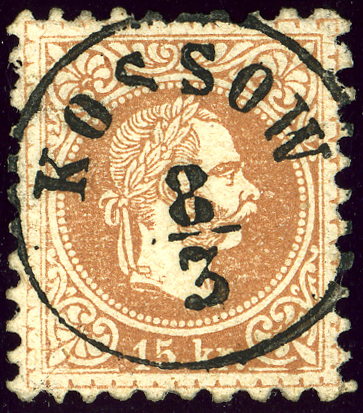
Under Austrian Galicia province, the name was Kossow

== Geography ==
=== Location ===
Local orientation

Regional orientation

Today, the town of Kosiv borders on the towns and villages of Babyn, Horod, Smodna, Cherhanivka, Staryi Kosiv, Verbovets and Pistyn. The distance from the railroad station in Vizhnytsa is 12 kilometers, from Zabolotiv is 25 kilometers and from Kolomyia — 35 kilometers. Roads with all neighbouring districts connect the city. The total length of roads is 362 kilometers. 160 kilometers of these roads are paved.

Panorama of Kosiv

== Notable people ==
- Ivan Andreikanich – sculptor
- Natalka Andrusiv – Ukrainian opera singer
- Oleksa Bakhmatiuk – Ukrainian master of decorative tile painting
- Ivan and Mykhailo Baraniuk's – Ukrainian master of artistic ceramics
- Volodymyr Blavackiy – Ukrainian actor, director
- Vasyl Bovych – master wood carver
- Rostyslav Derzhypilsky - Ukrainian theatre director and actor
- Menachem Mendel Hager – Hasidic rebbe
- Ostap Havrysch – Ukrainian composer
- Mykhailo Horboviy – painter, master wood carver
- Bogdana Matsotska – Ukrainian Olympic skier
- Volodymyr Kovalyuk – professional Ukrainian soccer player
- Myroslav Laiuk – writer
- Julian Jaworski – Polish scientist, deputy mayor of Kraków, deputy to the Sejm in 1961 – 1965
- Kazimierz Moklowski – Polish architect
- Tadeusz Moklowski – Polish chemist
- Illia Mykhavchuk – Ukrainian designer
- Anna Pavlyk – Ukrainian activist and writer

== See also ==
- Kosov (Hasidic dynasty)
- Kosovo for places with similar names.
- Kosov for places with similar names.
