= Oleksa Bakhmatiuk =

Ukrainian master of decorative tile painting (1820–1882)

- Олександр Петрович Бахматюк
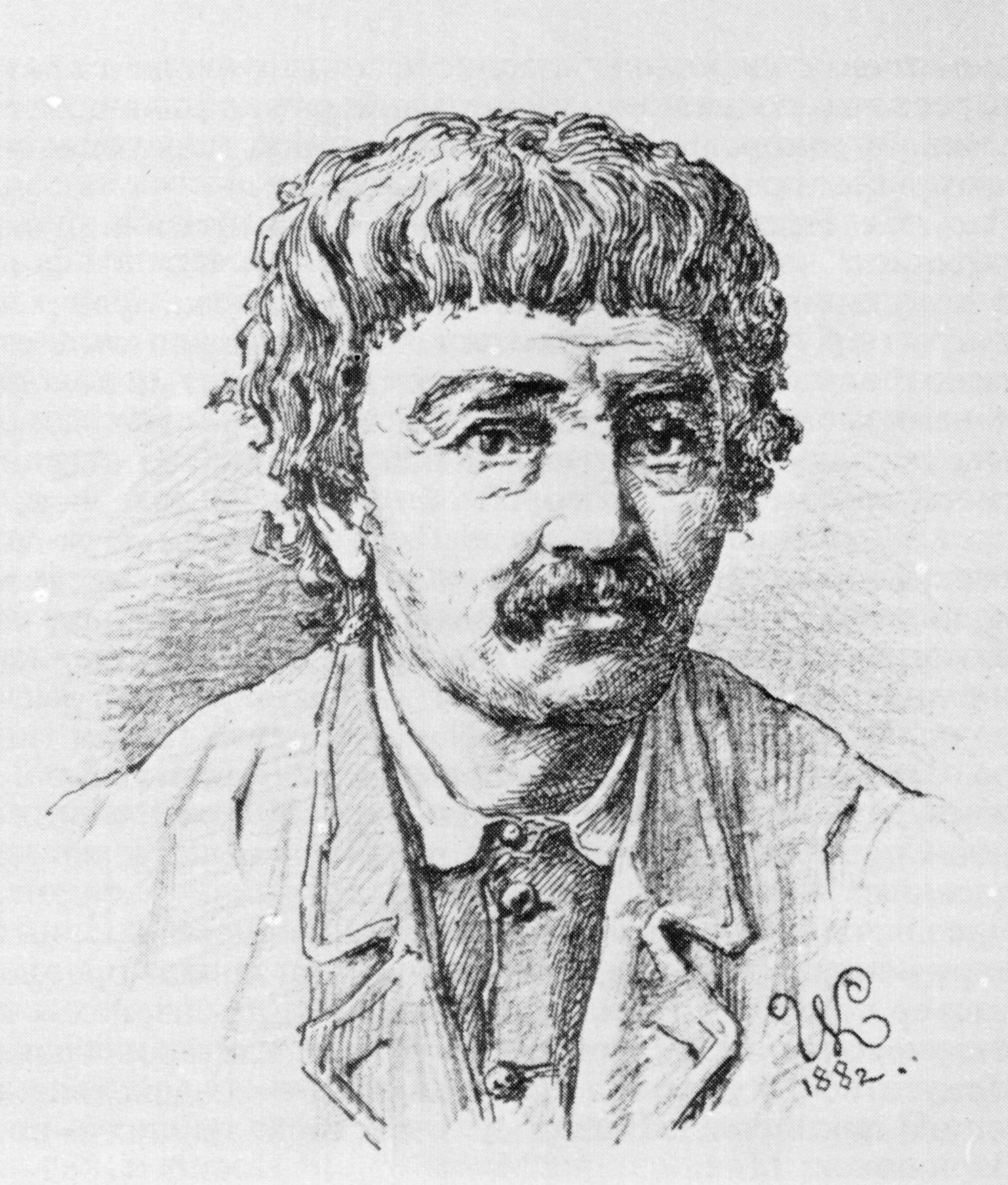
- Oleksa Bakhmatiuk (drawing by an unknown painter)
- Born: 10 December 1820; Kosiv, now Ivano-Frankivsk Oblast, Ukraine
- Died: 15 March 1882 (aged 61); Kosiv, now Ivano-Frankivsk Oblast, Ukraine
- Occupation: Master of decorative tile painting

Oleksa Bakhmatiuk (Ukrainian: Олександр Петрович Бахматюк; 10 December 1820, Kosiv, now Ivano-Frankivsk Oblast – 15 March 1882, there too) was a Ukrainian master of decorative tile painting.

At the Kolomyia Industrial Exhibition in 1880, where Oleksa Bakhmatiuk works were displayed, he received a gold award.

== Plots and creative style ==
In the depiction of people, Bakhmatiuk developed a special manner, a certain canon. All of them are clearly typified. The figures, as a rule, stand in profile. Women—whether urban or Hutsul—are dressed in blouses and long skirts. Men are in short attire (only the depiction of the head changes: sometimes it is bare, sometimes it has a top hat (tsylindr) on it, sometimes a Hutsul klepania). The world of flora and fauna is widely represented by the master. Here, a flower that resembles a sunflower stands out—multi-petaled with a wide, hatched (cross-hatched/shaded) middle. There are depictions of beasts and birds—deer, bulls, lions, and luxurious peacocks and roosters.

Bakhmatiuk, like other masters, invariably painted one or two images of Saint Nicholas on each of his stoves, in episcopal vestments, with sacred attributes in his hands, and a halo around his head. This was adherence to local traditions that had developed back at the beginning of the 19th century. On either side of the head were two figures (numbers) which indicated the date the stove was made.

== Memory ==
A street in Kolomyia and Lviv has been named in honor of Oleksa Bakhmatiuk.

== Bibliography ==
- Юрій Лащук. Олекса Бахматюк: видатний гончар з Косова.
- Олекса Бахматюк. Художня кераміка. Автор-упорядник Орест Чорний. — Косів, Карпатська академія етнодизайну, 2011. — 92 с.
- Бахметюк Олександр Петрович (Бахмицький, Бахминський) // Митці України: Енциклопедичний довідник / Упорядники: М. Г. Лабінський, В. С. Мурза. За редакцією А. В. Кудрицького. — К. : Українська енциклопедія, 1992. — С. 52. — ISBN 978-5-88500-042-0.
- Бахматюк Олександр Петрович // Мистецтво України: Біографічний довідник / Упорядники: А. В. Кудрицький, М. Г. Лабінський. — 2-ге вид. — К. : Українська енциклопедія, 1997. — С. 46. — ISBN 978-5-88500-042-0.
- Олекса Бахматюк: Альбом. — К.: Мистецтво, 1976.
- Івашків Г. Деякі штрихи до творчого портрета Олекси Бахматюка // Колективне та індивідуальне як чинники національної своєрідності народного мистецтва. Тези IV Гончарівських читань. — К., 1997. — С. 32.
- Івашків Г. М. Декор традиційної української кераміки XVIII — першої половини XX століття (іконографія, домінантні мотиви, художні особливості). — Рукопис.
- Цигани і Гуцульщина крізь призму розписів у кераміці.
