= May 1974 =

Month of 1974

<<	May 1974					>>
Su	Mo	Tu	We	Th	Fr	Sa
			1	2	3	4
5	6	7	8	9	10	11
12	13	14	15	16	17	18
19	20	21	22	23	24	25
26	27	28	29	30	31

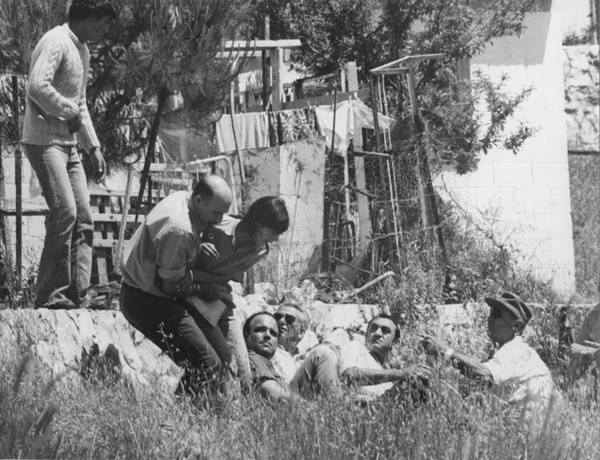
May 15, 1974: Mordechai Hod and Moshe Dayan help rescue hostages from the Ma'alot massacre

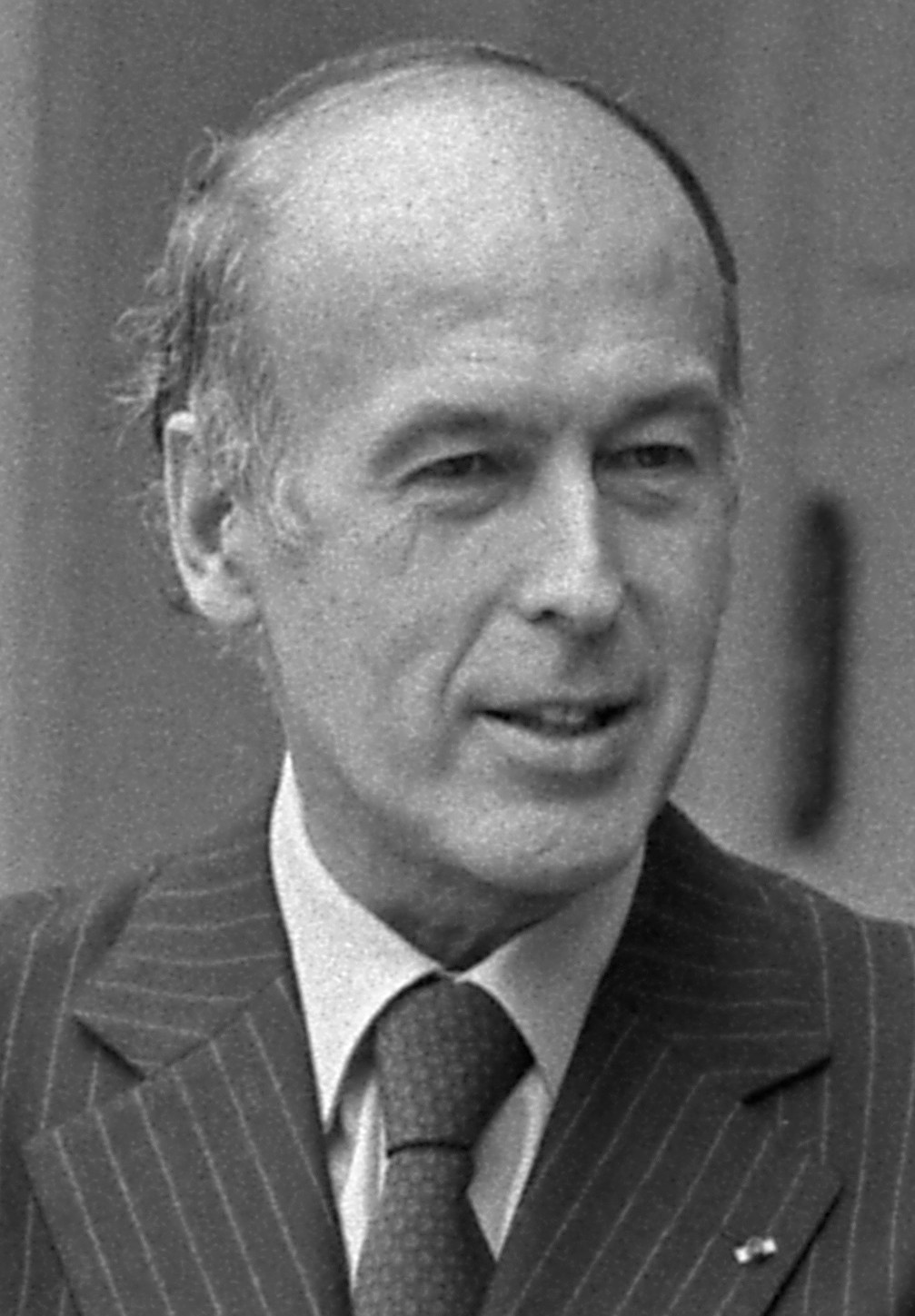
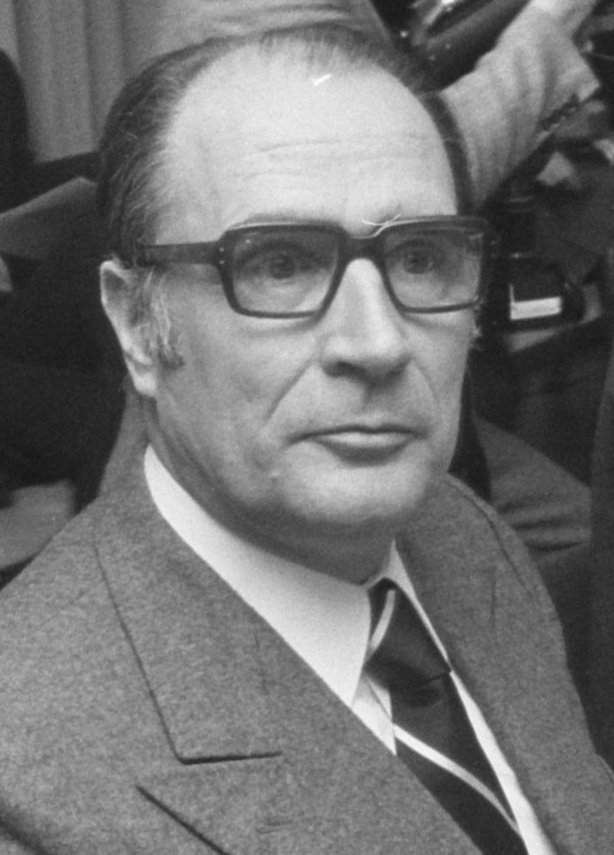
May 19, 1974: Valery Giscard defeats Francois Mitterrand to win election as President of France

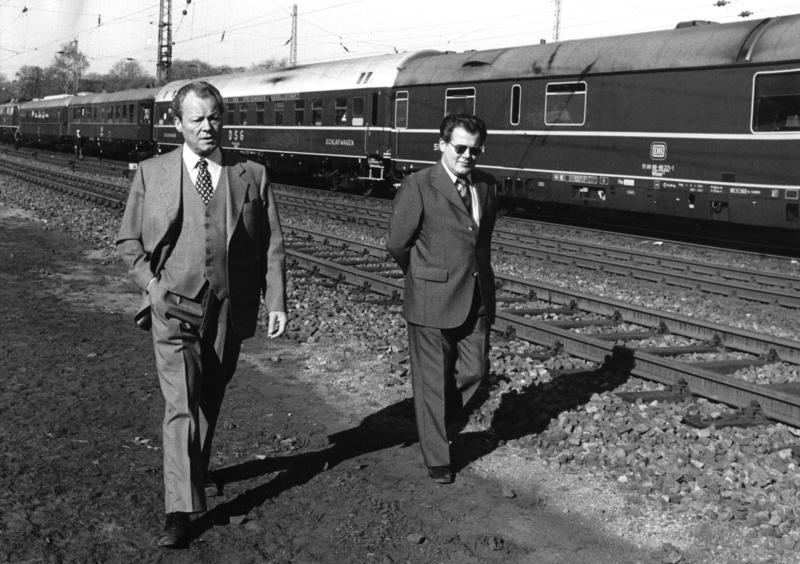
May 6, 1974: West German Chancellor Willy Brandt resigns after revelation that his aide Gunther Guillaume (right) was an East German spy

The following events occurred in May 1974:

== May 1, 1974 (Wednesday) ==
- The first successful nuclear fusion using a laser, (inertial confinement fusion), was achieved by scientists at KMS Industries, backed by Keeve M. "Kip" Siegel at Ann Arbor, Michigan, targeting a deuterium-tritium pellet and collecting the evidence with neutron-sensitive nuclear emulsion detectors developed by physicist Robert Hofstadter. After confirmation of the results, the breakthrough was announced 12 days later, on May 13.
- By order of the new Portuguese government, the colonial administrators of Mozambique released 554 political prisoners incarcerated at the Machava Prison. The release was supervised by the new head of the colonial police, Colonel Antonio Maria Rebelo. On the same day, Portugal closed the Tarrafal concentration camp, located on Santiago Island at Cape Verde, where hundreds of Portuguese and African political prisoners had been confined for life.
- In San Francisco, seven African-American men were arrested in the Zebra murders case. Four of the men were released for lack of evidence on May 3. The other three— J. C. Simon, 29; Larry Green, 22; and Manuel Moore, 23— went to trial along with Jessie Lee Cooks, who had been arrested earlier, and all four would be convicted of murder in 1976 and sentenced to life imprisonment.
- In Seoul, an intoxicated South Korean Army paratrooper, Private Kim Won-je, shot and killed six fellow soldiers and three civilians. He held 200 troops and police at bay for two hours before killing himself. Private Kim's motive had apparently been his anger and being informed that he was being recalled to the army barracks.
- During International Workers' Day celebrations on May Day in Buenos Aires' Plaza de Mayo, President Juan Perón denounced the Montoneros, his left-wing guerrilla supporters, implicitly blaming them for the assassinations of conservative trade union leaders.
- Two airline employees were injured when a bomb exploded in a locker at John F. Kennedy International Airport in New York City.
- The KVNB Cup for the championship of soccer football in the Netherlands was won by PSV Eindhoven, 6 to 0, over NAC Breda before 38,000 spectators at Feyenoord Stadium in Rotterdam.
- Alf Ramsey, the manager of the England national football team since 1963, known for coaching the team that won the 1966 World Cup, was fired by England's Football Association after England failed to qualify for the 1974 World Cup, missing the world championship final tournament for the first time in its history.
- Born: Lornah Kiplagat, Kenyan-born Dutch Olympic runner, 2007 cross country world champion; in Kabiemit, Keiyo District
- Died: Sir Frank Packer KBE, OStJ, 67, Australian media magnate and owner of the Nine Network and of Australian Consolidated Press

== May 2, 1974 (Thursday) ==
- Six people were killed in Northern Ireland, and 18 injured, when the Ulster Volunteer Force terrorist group detonated a bomb in the Rose & Crown Bar in Belfast.
- The crash of an ATESA airlines DC-3 in Ecuador killed all 22 people aboard, when the plane flew into the side of the inactive Tungurahua volcano in the Andes, east of Quito. The airplane was on its way from the airport at Puyo to Ambato when it hit the 16,480 feet (5,020 m) volcano at an altitude of 11,200 feet (3,400 m).
- West Germany's unofficial diplomatic mission to East Germany, the "Permanent Representation Office" (Ständiger Vertretungen), opened in East Berlin with Günter Gaus as the West German representative. In that the position of the West German government was that the German Democratic Republic in the east was illegal, the two nations stopped short of giving recognition to each other's governments. At the same time, East Germany opened its office in Bonn, with Michael Kohl as its envoy.
- General Antonio de Spinola, head of the military junta that overthrew Portugal's dictatorship, ordered amnesty to thousands of young Portuguese men who had been charged with desertion for fleeing the country to avoid serving in colonial wars. Spinola said that any draft dodger who reported to his military unit within 15 days would not be charged with desertion, and that any soldiers convicted of desertion would be released from prison to return to peacetime military service.
- Former U.S. Vice President Spiro Agnew was disbarred from the practice of law in a unanimous decision of the Maryland Court of Appeals, the highest in the state. Agnew, who had pled no contest to a charge of tax evasion on October 10 and resigned the office, was described by the Court as "so morally obtuse that he consciously cheats for his own pecuniary gain."
- The 47.69 carat Star of South Africa diamond was sold at an auction in Geneva for 1.6 million Swiss francs (equivalent to £225,300 or $542,000).
- Born:
  - Jon Oringer, American computer programmer and billionaire businessman, founder of Shutterstock; in Scarsdale, New York
  - Matt Berry, English actor known for Toast of London, 2015 BAFTA Award winner for Best Male Performance in a Comedy Programme; in Bromham, Bedfordshire
  - Chang Chen-yue, aboriginal Taiwanese rock and hip-hop musician, 2013 Golden Melody Awards winner for Best Album; in Suao Township, Yilan County, Taiwan
- Died:
  - James O. Richardson, 95, United States Navy admiral, commander in chief of the United States Fleet (CinCUS), relieved of command after warning against the redeployment and concentration of the Pacific Fleet at Pearl Harbor in Hawaii in 1941.
  - Frank Moraes, 66, Indian journalist and newspaper columnist, editor of The Indian Express 1957 to 1972
  - Ebbe Munck, 69, Danish Resistance fighter in World War II, later Denmark's Ambassador to Thailand and chief of the royal court

== May 3, 1974 (Friday) ==
- Colombian serial rapist Daniel Camargo Barbosa was arrested in Barranquilla for his first of at least 72 murders.
- Born:
  - Princess Haya bint Hussein of Jordan, Olympic equestrian, daughter of King Hussein; in Amman, Amman Governorate
  - Joseph Kosinski, American computer-generated imagery (CGI) expert and film director known for Tron: Legacy; in Marshalltown, Iowa
- Died: Helen Hemingway Benton, 72, owner and publisher of Encyclopædia Britannica, widow of U.S. Senator William Benton

== May 4, 1974 (Saturday) ==
- An all-female Japanese team reached the top of the Himalayan mountain Manaslu in Nepal, becoming the first women to climb an 8,000 m (26,000 ft) peak.
- Five men died in an explosion at a dynamite factory in Burbach, North Rhine-Westphalia in West Germany. The employees of Dynamit-Novel AG in Burbach-Wuergendorf had been inside a concrete shelter and were operating a machine used for mixing gunpowder.
- In Manhattan, a crowd of 1,000 rallied on Christopher Street to urge the New York City Council to pass a bill recognizing equal rights for gay and lesbian people.
- Cannonade, ridden by jockey Ángel Cordero Jr., won the 1974 Kentucky Derby, the 100th running of the event, at Churchill Downs in Louisville, Kentucky.

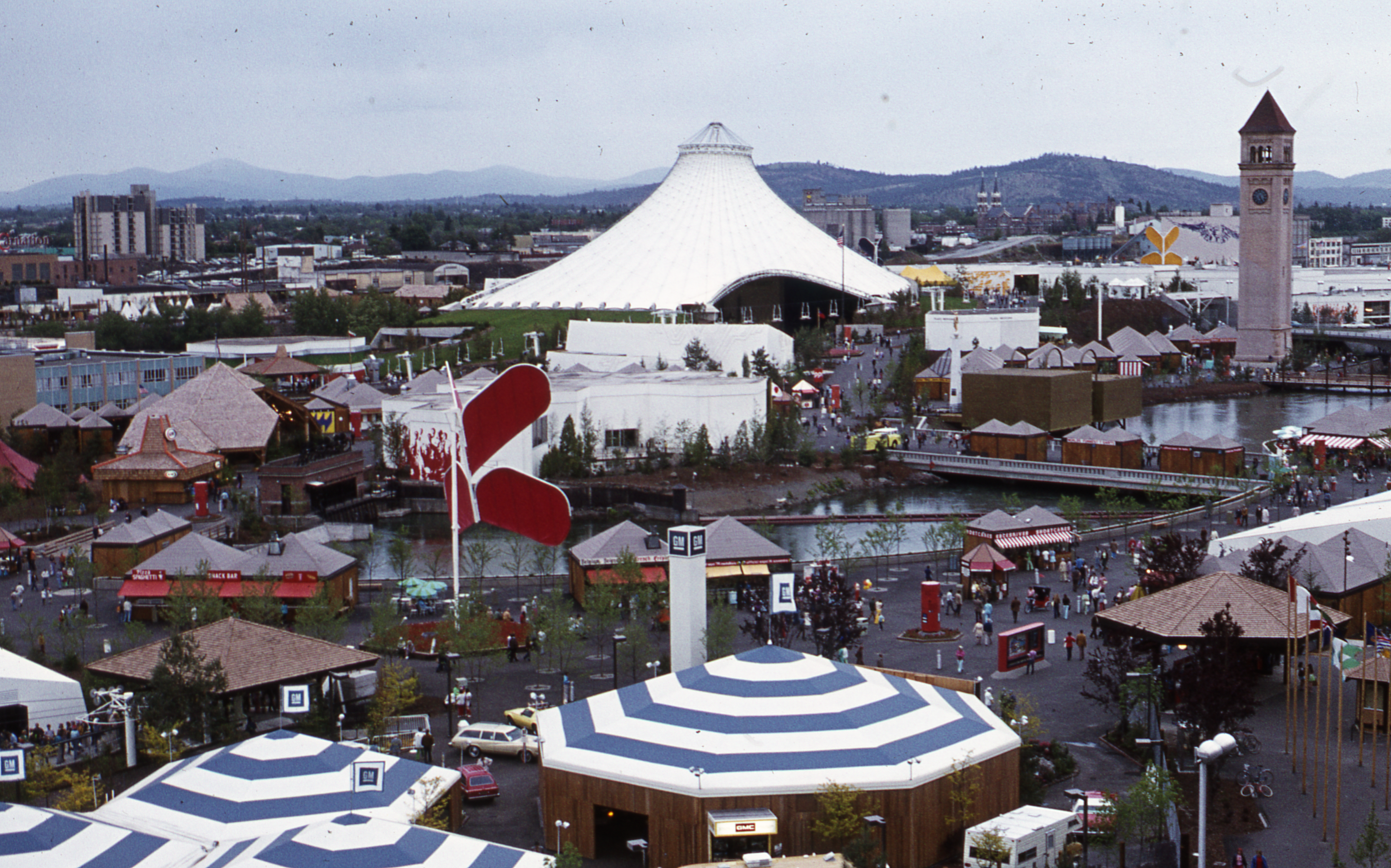
Expo '74

- The Expo '74 world's fair was opened in Spokane, Washington as U.S. President Richard Nixon declared the start of the fair at a ceremony attended by 85,000 people.
- The New Mangalore Port, now the seventh largest in India, was opened in the Karnataka state.
- The Scottish Cup, Scotland's knockout tournament of soccer football, was won by Celtic F.C. of Glasgow, 3 to 0 over Dundee United F.C. before 75,959 spectators at Glasgow's Hampden Park. During the regular season of the Scottish Football League, Celtic had finished in first place (23 wins, 7 draws, 4 losses) and Dundee in fifth place (16–7–11).
- Died: Maurice Ewing, 77, American geophysicist and oceanographer, discoverer of the SOFAR channel (deep sound channel) within the ocean

== May 5, 1974 (Sunday) ==
- In the first round of voting in the French presidential election, François Mitterrand of the Parti socialiste received a plurality of the vote (over 11 million, and more than 43% of the votes dast, and Valéry Giscard d'Estaing of the Fédération nationale des républicains et indépendants (FNRI) finished second (8.3 million and 32.6%). Since no candidate received at least 50 percent of the votes cast, a runoff election between the top two finishers— Mitterrand and Giscard— was held two weeks later, on May 19. The vote had been prompted in the wake of President Georges Pompidou's death on April 2.
- In India, eight people were killed and 50 injured in rioting between Hindus and Muslims in Delhi at the Sadar Bazar. The riot was the worst in Delhi since India had achieved independence in 1947.
- Airport workers in Mexico City discovered a leaking container of nitric acid in the cargo hold of a Boeing 707 that was preparing to depart on a flight to Tijuana with 75 passengers and a crew of six. The acid had damaged suitcases and was eroding the aluminum floor when it was discovered. The airport authority said that the acid "could have eaten through the fuselage and caused the jet to explode in midair."
- The championship of Ireland's National Hurling League was won by Cork GAA over Limerick GAA, 6-15 to 1-12 (equivalent to 33 to 15 based on 3-points for a goal and 1 point for shots above the crossbar.
- David Pearson won the 1974 Winston 500 at Alabama International Motor Speedway in Talladega, Alabama. Three members of Gary Bettenhausen's pit crew were injured, one seriously, when Grant Adcox crashed into Bettenhausen's car in the pit.
- Malcolm Arnold's Symphony No. 7 was publicly performed for the first time, premiered by London's New Philharmonia Orchestra at the Royal Festival Hall.
- Died:
  - Abu Bakar Ri’ayatuddin Al-Mu’azzam, 69, hereditary ruler of the Sultanate of Pahang in Malaysia for more than 40 years, beginning in 1932. Abu Bakar was succeeded by his son, Ahmad Shah Al-Musta’in Billah ibni Almarhum, who would later serve as the monarch of Malaysia from 1979 to 1984.
  - Vito Tamulis, 62, American Major League Baseball pitcher

== May 6, 1974 (Monday) ==
- Willy Brandt, the Chancellor of West Germany, presented his resignation to President Gustav Heinemann after his personal assistant, Günter Guillaume, had been discovered to be a spy for East Germany.
- In Iceland, the coalition government of Prime Minister Ólafur Jóhannesson collapsed. Jóhannesson did not resign immediately, but elections were scheduled for June 30 for the Althing, Iceland's parliament.
- Portugal's General Francisco Costa da Gomes offered a cease-fire in its ongoing war against independence movements in the African colonies of Angola, Mozambique and Portuguese Guinea, conditioned on the rebels' acceptance of a plan of democracy and protection of the white European residents of the colonies.
- World Team Tennis (WTT), a new format in tennis with players on franchised teams in North American cities, played its very first match, debuting before a crowd of 10,611 people inside the Philadelphia Spectrum indoor arena, as the Philadelphia Freedoms, featuring league founder Billie Jean King, defeated the Pittsburgh Triangles, 31 to 25.
- The Partido Social Democrata (PSD) was founded in Portugal by Francisco Sá Carneiro, Francisco Pinto Balsemão and Joaquim Magalhães Mota, liberal members of the Assembleia Nacional. From 1934 to 1974, the only legal political party had been the União Nacional and elections were limited to the top 130 finishers in voting for a list of party candidates. Originally called the Partido Popular Democrático, the PSD was formed two weeks after democracy was restored in Portugal after the Carnation Revolution.
- Johannes Vermeer's painting The Guitar Player, stolen from London on February 23, was recovered by Scotland Yard after a caller said that it could be found in the cemetery adjacent to the St Bartholomew-the-Great church at Smithfield, London. The painting, more than 300 years old, was relatively undamaged except for some dampness.
- Died:
  - Vera Gilbride Davis, 79, described as the Grand Dame of Delaware Politics
  - Walter C. Lowdermilk, 85, American soil conservationist who worked internationally on reclamation of farm lands in Belgium and in Israel to alleviate famine.
  - Robert Maestri, 74, former Mayor of New Orleans and campaign manager for Huey Long
  - Ángel Sagaz Zubelzu, 61, Ambassador of Spain to the United States, died of bladder cancer.

== May 7, 1974 (Tuesday) ==
- West Germany's president Gustav Heinemann accepted the resignation, made the day before, of Chancellor Willy Brandt and temporarily appointed Vice Chancellor Walter Scheel as head of government until Brandt's Sozialdemokratische Partei could select a new leader who would serve as chancellor. An election was scheduled for May 16 on whether to approve Finance Minister Helmut Schmidt, Brandt's choice, as successor.
- German serial killer Volker Eckert committed the first of at least six murders of teenage girls and young women, but may have killed as many as 19. Eckert, only 14 years old, strangled a classmate, Silvia Unterdörfel, at her home in Plauen.
- In the U.S., delegates to the convention of the League of Women Voters voted to allow men to become members, favoring the measure by a vote of 935 to 433, more than the two-thirds majority required by the League's bylaws.
- At least 15 Haitian refugees drowned in Nassau Harbor in the Bahamas after the boat they were in struck a reef and capsized. Another 32 were able to swim ashore to Paradise Island.
- Born:
  - Lawrence Johnson, American pole vaulter, 2001 world indoor champion; in Norfolk, Virginia
  - Breckin Meyer, American TV and film actor; in Minneapolis, Minnesota
- Died: Fred Kelly, 82, U.S. Olympian and 1912 gold medalist in the 110 meter hurdles

== May 8, 1974 (Wednesday) ==
- Indian Railways workers began a strike that would last until May 27. With 700,000 of Indian Railways' 1,400,000 workers halting their labor, the strike was the largest recorded industrial action in world history.
- In Canada, the government of Prime Minister Pierre Trudeau lost a vote of no confidence in the House of Commons, 137 to 123. Trudeau announced that he would ask for new elections for July 8. Governor-General Jules Leger dissolved the House the next day and scheduled elections.
- Elie Wiesel's play Zalmen, or The Madness of God premiered at the Arena Stage in Washington, D.C.
- Born: Marge Kõrkjas, Estonian Paralympic swimmer, 1996 gold medalist; in Rakvere, Estonian Soviet Socialist Republic, Soviet Union
- Died:
  - Robert Cutler, 78, the first official U.S. National Security Advisor, serving U.S. President Eisenhower 1953 to 1955 and 1957 to 1958
  - Graham Bond, 36, English rock musician, was killed after being run over on the railway tracks near the Finsbury Park station in North London, after falling or jumping in front of a train bound for the London Underground. According to a news report after he was identified, he "was found beneath a train at Finsbury Park, London, near the Rainbow Theatre."
  - H. Roe Bartle, 72, former Mayor of Kansas City, Missouri, died of complications of diabetes.

== May 9, 1974 (Thursday) ==
- The Judiciary Committee of the U.S. House of Representatives, composed of 21 Democrats and 17 Republicans and chaired by Peter W. Rodino, opened hearings on whether there was probable cause for a vote of the full House on impeachment of the U.S. president, Richard Nixon. The opening of the hearing, the first on impeachment of a U.S. president since 1868, was nationally televised for 20 minutes before moving to a closed-door session for the next two and a half hours.
- A 6.5 magnitude earthquake struck Japan, killed 30 people and injured 102 southwest of Tokyo. Most of the dead were in the village of Nakagi, which "slid down a slope and was destroyed" in the disaster.
- Born:
  - Brian Deegan, American motocross racer, summer and winter X Games gold medalist
  - Lowie Vermeersch, Belgian automobile designer for Carrozzeria Pininfarina; in Kortrijk
- Died: Charles Katz, 46, American mathematician and computer scientist, co-developer of the compiler programs for the UNIVAC programming languages, died after an illness.

== May 10, 1974 (Friday) ==
- Northern Irish terrorist Brendan Hughes, commanding officer of the Belfast Brigade of the Provisional IRA, was arrested in Belfast five months after escaping from Maze Prison. During his time on the run, he had assumed the name "Arthur McAllister" and posed as a traveling salesman.
- In Italy, police in Alessandria stormed a prison hospital where 21 hostages had been taken the day before by three armed prisoners. Two of the three inmates, and three of the hostages, were shot to death, and 15 were wounded. After hours of negotiations, police had intervened "when they heard gunfire and shouts" and "believed the prisoners were executing the hostages."
- Dominican Republic President Joaquín Balaguer and six other people were able to escape a helicopter crash before the aircraft burst into flames. Balaguer was accompanied by the Caribbean nation's chief of the armed forces, Rear Admiral Ramon Jimenez, along with General Eligio Bisono Jackson and Major General Santos Melido Marte on a campaign trip, and was returning to Santo Domingo from Puerto Plata in a heavy rainstorm when the main rotor system failed and the aircraft made a hard landing on a hill 27 miles (43 km) from the capital.
- G. Gordon Liddy, already convicted of crimes in the Watergate scandal, was found guilty of contempt of Congress. Because Liddy was already serving two other sentences, he received a six-month suspended sentence and one year's probation.
- The New York Nets defeated the host Utah Stars, 111 to 100, to win the championship of the American Basketball Association, 4 games to 1.
- All six people aboard a Sikorsky S-61 helicopter were killed when the aircraft, operated by KLM Helikopters, crashed into the North Sea while en route to an oil rig. The cause was later traced to metal fatigue in one of five rotor blades. The aircraft was recovered from the North Sea floor. It was sold to Carson Helicopter in the US and re-registered as N87580.
- Officer Michael Lee Edwards of the Los Angeles Police Department was last seen alive leaving the police academy. His handcuffed body, shot execution-style, was found the next day in an abandoned building. Edwards' murder has never been solved.
- A rear end collision between two trains on the Chicago Transit Authority elevated railway injured 222 people but caused no reported deaths.
- Born:
  - Liu Fang, Chinese–Canadian pipa player; in Kunming, Yunnan
  - Sylvain Wiltord, French footballer; in Neuilly-sur-Marne
- Died:
  - Hal Mohr, A.S.C., 79, American cinematographer known for The Jazz Singer and Phantom of the Opera
  - James Muilenburg, 77, American Biblical scholar who worked on the New Revised Version of the Old Testament
  - Takeshi Sakamoto, 74, Japanese actor in more than 300 films between 1925 and 1965

== May 11, 1974 (Saturday) ==
- A 7.1 magnitude earthquake struck China's Yunnan province at 3:25 in the morning local time, and killed at least 1,200 people and possibly as many as 20,000 in and around the Chinese city of Zhaotong.
- In Colombia, police in Bogotá rescued all the passengers and crew of a hijacked Avianca Boeing 727, 19 hours after the jet had been taken over by three men who were armed with pistols and sticks of TNT. A group of police, posing as members of a flight crew, shot two of the hijackers while the hostage pilot used karate chops to subdue the third one. The flight from Pereira to Bogota had been diverted on a course to Cali, back to Pereira and then onto Bogota.
- Six people were killed and 35 injured in the crash of a Greyhound bus near Charleston, Missouri. The bus, traveling from Chicago to Memphis, sideswiped an overturned truck, tearing the right side of the bus open.
- Born: Simon Aspelin, Swedish tennis player; in Saltsjöbaden
- Died: Eleanor Tennant, 79, American tennis player who was the first female player to turn professional

== May 12, 1974 (Sunday) ==
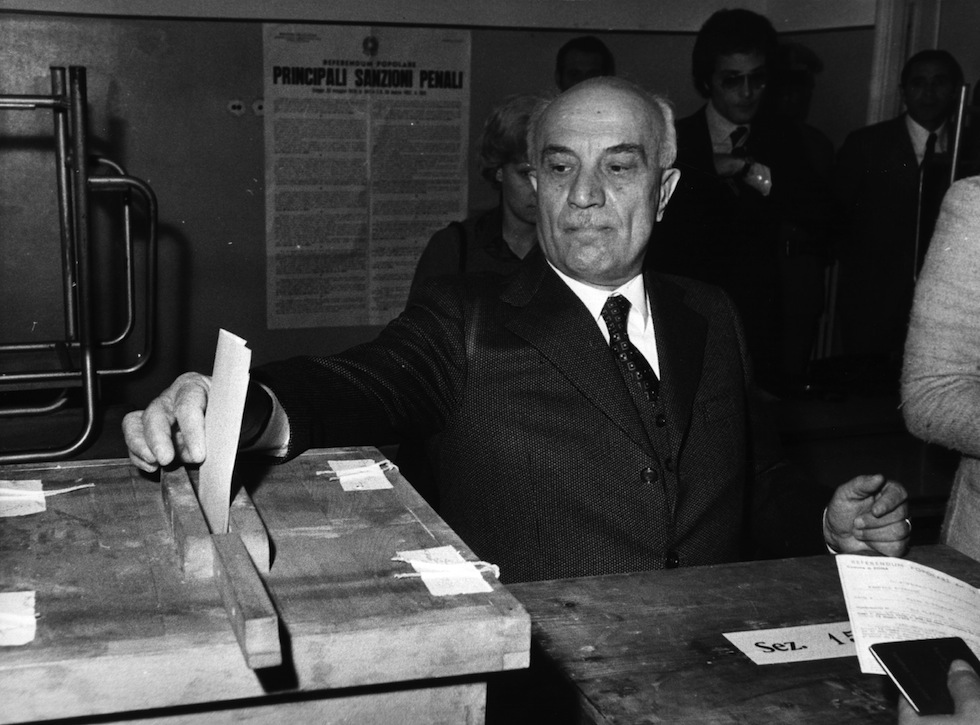
Italian politician Amintore Fanfani casts his vote in the referendum

- Voters in Italy overwhelmingly favored keeping the right to divorce as they went to the polls in the first referendum in the history of the Italian republic. In balloting on Sunday and Monday, voters were asked to vote yes or no on the question, "Do you want the Law of 1 December 1970, No. 898, on the regulation of cases of dissolution of marriage, to be abrogated?", and although more than 13 million voted yes, over 19 million voted no, and the matter failed by a margin of 59% to 41%.
- The Republic of Iraq executed five Kurdish activists by hanging, including Leyla Qasim, after the group had been convicted in a nationally televised trial on charges of attempting to hijack an airplane and to kill President Saddam Hussein.
- With the best four of seven championship of the National Basketball Association tied at 3 games apiece, the Boston Celtics defeated the host Milwaukee Bucks, 102 to 87, to win the title.
- Australian John Newcombe won the $50,000 World Championship of Tennis (WCT) final over Swedish teenager Björn Borg, after losing the first set and then sweeping the next three of the best 4-of-7 match. The score was 4–6, 6–3, 6–3, 6–2.
- Brazilian driver Emerson Fittipaldi won the 1974 Belgian Grand Prix at Nivelles-Baulers.
- Born: Manoj Gajurel, Nepalese comedian and TV star; in Khebang
- Died:
  - Trudy Goth, 60, German-born American dancer and writer, died of cancer.
  - Georges Hirsch, 79, former and director of the Paris Opera
  - Wayne Maki, 29, Canadian NHL player for the Vancouver Canucks, whose career had ended during the 1972-1973 NHL season when he was diagnosed with brain cancer.

== May 13, 1974 (Monday) ==
- By a margin of 29 for and 51 against, the United States Senate rejected a bill filed by Senator Bob Dole of Kansas to allow states to raise the U.S. highway speed limit from 55 miles per hour (89 km/h) to 60 miles per hour (97 km/h).
- KMS Industries of Ann Arbor, Michigan, announced the achievement of nuclear fusion on a small scale using laser light.
- In the U.S. state of New York, Mohawk residents of the St. Regis Mohawk Reservation in Franklin County and of Canada's Akwesasne 59 Mohawk Nation reserve began an occupation of the abandoned Moss Lake Girl Scouts camp near Old Forge, New York, in Herkimer County, reclaiming it as traditional Mohawk land.
- Died:
  - Vern Knudsen, 80, American physicist and acoustical engineer, known for the application of acoustical design to architecture.
  - Lu Han, 79, Chinese general who defected from Taiwan to the People's Republic of China
  - Denny Shute, 69, U.S. professional golfer who won the British Open in 1933 and the PGA championship in 1936 and 1937
  - Jaime Torres Bodet, 72, Mexican public servant and former Director-General of UNESCO, shot himself to death.
  - Khuda Buksh, 62, Bengali insurance entrepreneur

== May 14, 1974 (Tuesday) ==
- Dr. Donald Coggan, the Archbishop of York, was appointed as the new Archbishop of Canterbury by Queen Elizabeth II on the recommendation of Prime Minister Harold Wilson.
- Portugal's new government, installed during the Carnation Revolution, issued Law No. 2/74, abolishing the bicameral parliament of the Estado Novo, to be replaced by the unicameral Assembleia da República to be elected in 1975.
- In Central Park in New York City, 13-year-old John F. Kennedy Jr., son of the late president of the United States, was mugged by a boy of around 18, who took the young Kennedy's bicycle and tennis racket.
- Born: Keram Malicki-Sanchez, Canadian actor, musician, writer and technologist; in Mississauga, Ontario
- Died: Jacob L. Moreno, 82, Romanian-born American psychiatrist, pioneer in group psychotherapy and developer (with his wife, psychologist Zerka T. Moreno) of the technique of psychodrama.

== May 15, 1974 (Wednesday) ==
- An attempt by Israel's Sayeret Matkal to free 115 hostages, most of them students at the Netiv Meir Elementary School in Ma'alot-Tarshiha, resulted in the deaths of 25 captives and the injury of 68 others. All three of the terrorists, members of the Democratic Front for the Liberation of Palestine who had crossed over from Lebanon into Israel, were killed. Prior to seizing the school the terrorists had killed five other civilians. The next day, Israeli planes retaliated by bombing Palestinian targets in Lebanon, killing more than 20 people.
- Walter Scheel was elected to the ceremonial position of President of West Germany.
- General António de Spínola took office as President of Portugal. Hours after being sworn in, Spinola named Adelino da Palmas Carlos as Prime Minister of a cabinet that included Communists for the first time in Portugal's history, with Avelino Pacheco Goncalves as Minister of Labor and Communist Party Chief Alvaro Cunhal as a minister without portfolio.
- By the margin of a single vote, 47 to 46, the U.S. Senate tabled further discussion of an amendment to the $25 billion education funding bill that would have required an end to desegregation busing to achieve racial integration in U.S. schools receiving federal funding.
- The first game of the 6-team National Lacrosse League, the first professional box lacrosse circuit in North America, was played as the NLL made its debut before 9,120 fans at The Forum in Montreal. The Montreal Quebecois defeated the visiting Toronto Tomahawks, 14 to 8. John Davis of the Quebecois made the league's first score, 13 seconds into the game, with a shot past Tomahawks goalie Ron Thomas. In addition to the two Canadian franchises, the NLL had four U.S. teams: the Maryland Arrows, the Philadelphia Wings, the Rochester Griffins and the Syracuse Stingers.
- Died:
  - Lieutenant-General Guy Simonds, CC, CB, CBE, DSO, CD, 71, English-born commander of the Canadian Armed Forces in World War II
  - Harrison M. Sayre, 79, co-founder of My Weekly Reader magazine
  - Paul Gonsalves, 53, American jazz saxophonist in Duke Ellington's band, died of complications from narcotics abuse, 9 days before Ellington's death.

== May 16, 1974 (Thursday) ==
- Helmut Schmidt was elected as the new Chancellor of West Germany by the Bundestag by a vote of 267 to 225 along party lines.
- In Belgrade, Marshal Josip Broz Tito was unanimously re-elected by the 300-member Chamber of Deputies as the President of Yugoslavia and, at the age of 81, given an unlimited term to effectively make him president for life. The Communist nation's parliament also unanimously approved the selection of the first eight members of the new, nine-member "collective presidency" which would rotate to a new member each year after Tito's death. Petar Stambolic of the Socialist Republic of Serbia was the first person selected to the new office of Vice President of Yugoslavia for one year, after which the job would rotate to another member of the collective presidency.
- In voting in the Dominican Republic, Joaquín Balaguer was re-elected President with more than 84% of the vote against his challenger, Luis Lajara Burgos. Balaguer's Partido Reformista won 75 of the 91 seats in the House of Deputies, and 23 of the 27 seats in the Senate.
- In South Vietnam, the Battle of the Iron Triangle began in the Binh Duong Province to repel an invasion by North Vietnam, and would last more than six months. Although the South Vietnamese repelled the invasion and thousands of soldiers of North Vietnam's People's Army of Viet Nam (PAVN) were killed, the South's Army of the Republic of Viet Nam (ARVN) lost hundreds of soldiers. The counterattack came on the same day 5,000 North Vietnamese troops overran the Dak Pek Camp and its 369-member South Vietnamese Rangers battalion.
- Dybbuk, a ballet by Jerome Robbins with music by Leonard Bernstein, premiered in New York City at the Lincoln Center.
- Born: Laura Pausini, Italian pop music singer; in Faenza, Province of Ravenna, Emilia-Romagna
- Died:
  - Ruth McGinnis, 64, American straight pool player, and women's champion in 1946, died of cancer.
  - Billy Welu, 41, American professional bowler and commentator, winner of the American Bowling Congress Masters championship in 1964 and 1965

== May 17, 1974 (Friday) ==
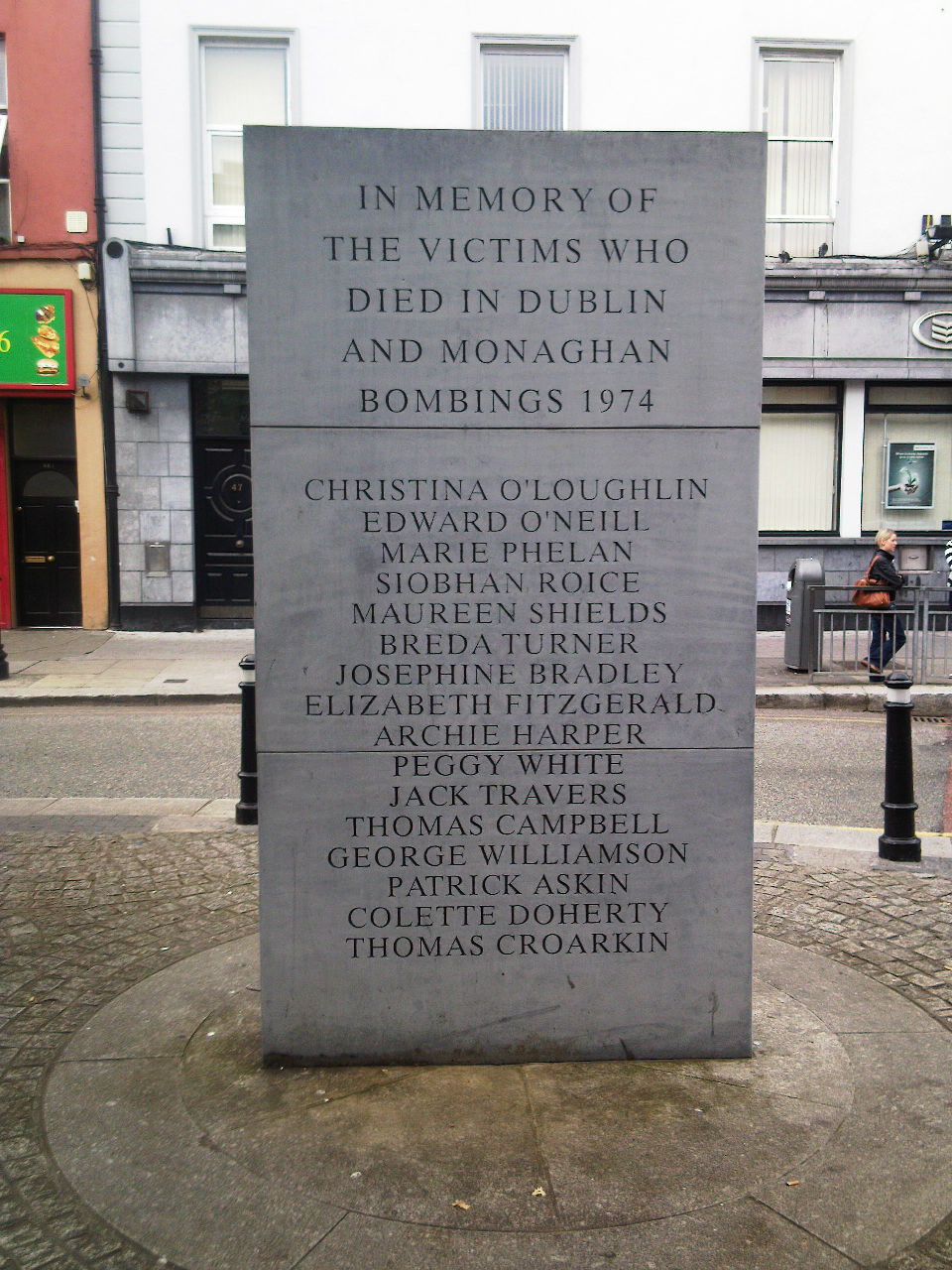
Memorial in Dublin to the victims of the UVF bombing

- UVF terrorists killed 33 civilians and injured more than 300 in the Republic of Ireland in four simultaneous car bomb explosions in County Dublin and County Monaghan. The event marked the highest number of casualties in any single event in The Troubles.
- In Lafayette, Louisiana, 28-year-old Russell James Foote, the director of the local chapter of the American Red Cross, was found in his car with a gunshot wound to the head inflicted by someone standing outside the car. He died shortly afterwards at Lafayette General Hospital. The investigation by the Lafayette Parish Sheriff's Office revealed embezzlement within the Red Cross office. As of 2018 Foote's murder had not been solved.

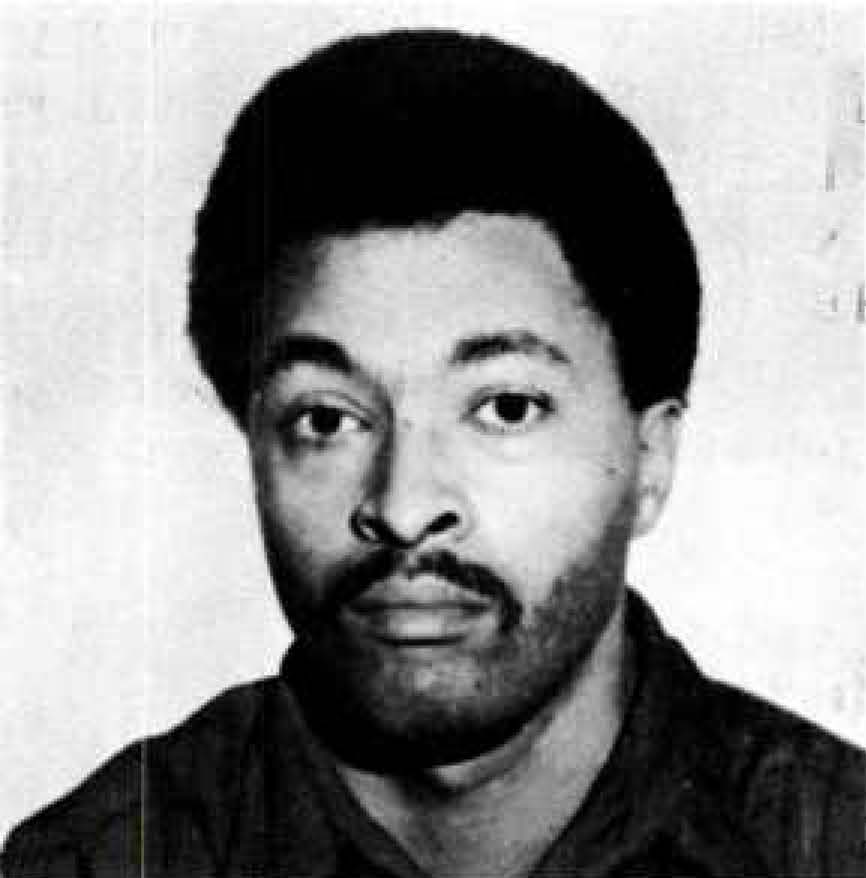
FBI mugshot of SLA commander Donald David DeFreeze

- In Compton, California, a shootout between members of the Los Angeles Police Department and the Symbionese Liberation Army (SLA) terrorist group began at 5:50 p.m. local time at the terrorist group's hideout at 1449 54th Street. The firing of tear gas canisters into the residence was followed by a fire that killed six of the SLA members, burning their bodies beyond recognition. The shootout and fire were broadcast on live television in Los Angeles, preempting national news programming. Six SLA members died during the incident. SLA leader Donald DeFreeze (aka Commander Cinque), 30, shot himself to death. Camilla Hall, 29, and SLA co-founder Nancy Ling Perry, 26, died after being shot by police. Patricia Soltysik, 24, Angela Atwood (aka General Gelina), 25, and Willie Wolfe (aka "Kahjoh"), 23, died of smoke inhalation or burns.
- The first Synchronous Meteorological Satellite, SMS-1, a weather satellite placed in geosynchronous orbit, was launched from Cape Canaveral, to be placed at a point 22,951 miles (36,936 km) above the Earth's equator and the 100th meridian west.
- The derailment of a Southern Railway train injured 133 people 15 miles (24 km) northwest of Tuscaloosa, Alabama.
- Born:
  - Andrea Corr, Irish pop music singer and member of The Corrs; in Dundalk, County Louth
  - Tamara Rojo, Canadian-born Spanish ballet dancer, principal dancer in the English National Ballet; in Montreal
- Died:
  - Durga Das, 73, Indian journalist, editor of the Hindustan Times and founder of the India News and Feature Alliance (INFA) news agency.
  - Maurice Lehmann, 79, French actor, director and producer, former general manager of the Paris Opera.
  - Fritz Roethlisberger, 75, American social scientist and business theorist

== May 18, 1974 (Saturday) ==
- India became the sixth nuclear power, with the successful test of a low-yield weapon at the Pokhran Test Range in the state of Rajasthan. Taking place on Buddha Jayanti, celebrated as the birthday of Siddhartha Gautama Buddha, the test was code-named Project Smiling Buddha. The other nuclear powers at the time were the U.S., the Soviet Union, the United Kingdom, France, and the People's Republic of China.
- In voting for the Australian House of Representatives and the Australian Senate, Gough Whitlam's Labor government lost seats but maintained a slim majority in the 127-member House (66 to 61) over the Liberal/Country Coalition led by Billy Snedden. In the 60-seat Senate, the Labor Party and Snedden's Coalition won 29 seats each, while Tom Drake-Brockman of the National Alliance and independent Senator Michael Townley winning the other seat.
- In the final weekend of matches in West Germany's 1973–74 Bundesliga season, first-place Bayern Munich (20–9–4, 49 points) and second-place Borussia Mönchengladbach (20–6–7, 46 points) faced each other. Borussia, already eliminated from the race for first place, defeated Bayern Munich, 5 to 0.
- Little Current, ridden by jockey Miguel Rivera, won the 1974 Preakness Stakes at Pimlico Race Course in Baltimore.
- In fiction, May 18, 1974, is the "seventh day" in the bestselling 1962 novel Seven Days in May, about an attempted overthrow of the U.S. government. The day was modified to Sunday, May 19, for the 1964 film of the same name.
- Died:
  - Roald H. Fryxell, 40, American anthropologist, was killed in a car accident.
  - Martín Echegoyen, 83, former head of state of Uruguay as Chairman of the nine-member Consejo Nacional de Gobierno, 1959 to 1960
  - Tyree Glenn, 61. American jazz trombonist of the big band era
  - Xenia Makletzova, 81, Russian ballet dancer
  - Dan Topping, 61, American sports executive, former part owner and president of the New York Yankees, died of complications of emphysema.

== May 19, 1974 (Sunday) ==
- Valéry Giscard d'Estaing was elected President of France, defeating François Mitterrand by less than 425,000 votes out of more than 26 million cast, in what remains, as of the last vote in 2022, the closest presidential election in French history.
- A policeman in Belém, Brazil, fired on rioting fans at a soccer match between Clube do Remo and Paissandu-Belém. One fan was killed and three were critically injured.
- The Philadelphia Flyers won the 1974 Stanley Cup Finals, defeating the Boston Bruins 1 to 0 to win the series and the National Hockey League title, four games to two. The Flyers, created in 1967 when the National Hockey League expanded from six teams to 12, became the first expansion team to win the Cup.
- On the same day, the Houston Aeros won the Avco World Trophy, defeating the host Chicago Cougars for the championship of the World Hockey Association in winning game four of the best-4-of-7 series, by a score of 6 to 2.
- Australia won the 1974 Federation Cup women's tennis tournament, held in Naples, Italy, defeating United States in the final.
- Born:
  - Andrew Johns, Australian rugby league player with 26 caps for the Australia national team; in Kurri Kurri, City of Cessnock, New South Wales
  - Nawazuddin Siddiqui, Indian film actor, 2016 Filmfare Awards winner for The Lunchbox; in Budhana, Uttar Pradesh

== May 20, 1974 (Monday) ==
- U.S. District Judge John J. Sirica ordered President Nixon to surrender 64 tape recordings of White House conversations that had been subpoenaed by the special prosecutor, Leon Jaworski. Addressing concerns of national security raised by Nixon's attorney, Sirica stated in his order that he would listen to individual tapes to determine whether they should be withheld from release. The U.S. Supreme Court would ultimately affirm Sirica's ruling in United States v. Nixon on July 24, leading to the release of the June 23, 1972, "smoking gun" tape and Nixon's resignation.
- Former Portuguese Prime Minister Marcelo Caetano and President Americo Thomaz, who had both been arrested after deposed on April 25 in the Carnation Revolution coup d'état, were sent into exile in Brazil along with their families. The former leaders boarded a Boeing 707 of the Portuguese Air Force at the Portuguese resort of Madeira and were flown to Viracopos International Airport in Brazil and driven to São Paulo, where they were provided with apartments on the 27th floor of the São Paulo Hilton hotel.
- The government of the Philippines and President Ferdinand Marcos gave formal recognition of the Sulu Sultanate with the issuance of Memorandum Order 427, with Mohammed Mahakuttah Abdullah Kiram. Zamboanga City was acknowledged as the capital of the self-governing monarchy on the Sulu island archipelago.
- Fretilin (Frente Revolucionária de Timor-Leste Independente), the Revolutionary Front for an Independent East Timor, was founded in the Portuguese colony one month after the Carnation Revolution in Portugal, as the Timorese Social Democratic Association (ASDT).
- The U.S. Department of Defense created the Ballistic Missile Defense Organization as an office consolidating all U.S. ballistic missile defenses, to replace the Safeguard Program.
- The U.S. Army abolished the office of Provost Marshal General, ending the term of Major General Lloyd B. Ramsey as Provost Marshal.
- Fire destroyed the Cody Enterprise newspaper building in Cody, Wyoming, killing a reporter and a volunteer firefighter. The fire rekindled from ashes left in the building's rafters from an arson fire in a neighboring alley the previous night.
- Died: Cardinal Jean Daniélou, 69, French Roman Catholic cardinal, appointed as a professor of theology and "one of the few priests to be named a cardinal without having served as a bishop or in any other administrative function", died of a stroke. Nine days later, the satirical French magazine Le Canard Enchaine reported that Danielou died in the apartment of a nightclub dancer, and on June 14, the Paris newspaper Le Monde published a confirmation of the story, with a columnist writing, "According to some, he died of a heart attack in the street... In fact, the cardinal died of a stroke soon after entering the apartment of a young woman who works in a Paris nightclub, whose flat he had already visited several times before."

== May 21, 1974 (Tuesday) ==
- The largest case of cheating at the United States Naval Academy was carried out at Annapolis, Maryland, when at least 60 and perhaps as many as 150 of 965 sophomore midshipmen were caught with the answers to the final exam in the Academy's class on navigation. In 1965, 109 cadets at the United States Air Force Academy at Colorado Springs, Colorado, had been forced to resign after being caught cheating. The leaked answers were traced to a U.S. Navy quartermaster who had given the information to 150 sophomores, one-sixth of the class of 1976. The 965 all took a new final exam on May 29.
- Thailand's Prime Minister Sanya Dharmasakti (also called Sanya Thammasak) and his cabinet resigned following public criticism over their inability to handle the Asian kingdom's skyrocketing inflation. Premier Sanya told a delegation of supporters later, "I wonder whether it was the right thing. I am very tired. So many people wanted so many things. I just made the decision that I can't stay any longer. I may enter the monkhood." After being asked by people from "all sectors of the country" to reconsider, Sanya announced that he would bring in 14 younger men to replace ministers who had resigned from the 28-member cabinet and was reappointed five days later.
- Fire destroyed Bob Stupak's World Famous Million Dollar Historic Gambling Museum and Casino on the Las Vegas Strip. Firefighters recovered currency the museum had used as wallpaper.
- Born: Fairuza Balk, American film actress known for Return to Oz and The Craft; in Point Reyes, California
- Died: Lily Kronberger, 83, Hungarian figure skater and winner of four consecutive ladies singles world championships (1908, 1909, 1910 and 1911)

== May 22, 1974 (Wednesday) ==
- What is now the world's largest national park, the Grønlands Nationalpark, was established by Denmark with the protection of 700,000 square kilometres (270,000 mi^{2}) of uninhabited territory in northeast Greenland. In 1988, it would be expanded to its current size of 972,000 square kilometres (375,000 mi^{2}).
- The Disaster Relief Act of 1974, authorizing the U.S. president to make declarations in order to hasten the sending of federal money to disaster-stricken areas in the United States and its territories, was signed into law by President Richard Nixon, after having passed 91 to 0 in the U.S. Senate and 392 to 0 in the House of Representatives.
- U.S. President Nixon informed the House Judiciary Committee that he would refuse to obey any further subpoenas for evidence or appearances.
- Born: Henrietta Ónodi, Hungarian artistic gymnast, 1992 Olympic gold medalist in the vault; in Békéscsaba, Békés County
- Died:
  - Irmgard Flügge-Lotz, 70, German-American mathematician and aerospace engineer
  - Ernie White, 57, American Major League Baseball pitcher

== May 23, 1974 (Thursday) ==
- The Airbus A300, the world's first twin-engine, double-aisle (wide-body) airliner, was introduced into commercial service with a flight by Air France from Paris to London.
- All 29 people aboard an Aeroflot Yakovlev Yak-40 airliner were killed when the airplane crashed during its scheduled approach to Kiev from a flight that had originated in Leningrad and had stopped at Khmelnitskiy in the Ukrainian SSR. Crash investigators concluded that the crew had been overcome by carbon monoxide as they were making their approach to Kiev's Zhulyany Airport and had failed to set several instruments. With the crew and passengers unconscious or dying, the Yak-40 crashed into a training range near Gorenychi at a speed of 260 miles (420 km) per hour.
- An electoral college met in Bonn to select the new President of West Germany, the largely ceremonial role of the nation's head of state. All 518 members of the parliament (496 from the Bundestag and 22 from the Bundesrat) and an equal number (518 delegates) from the West German states, for a total of 1,036 electors, participated. Vice Chancellor Walter Scheel of the Social Democrats defeated Richard von Weizsäcker of the Christian Democrats, 530 to 498, with eight abstentions.
- Pope Paul VI issued a papal bull proclaiming 1975 a Holy Year and appealing for world governments to grant amnesty to prisoners.
- One of the domes of Sacré-Cœur, Paris, was seriously damaged in an explosion which caused no deaths or injuries. Callers to the Agence France-Presse news service said they had set off the explosion to protest Valéry Giscard d'Estaing's election as president and to commemorate the 103rd anniversary of the Paris Commune.
- David Frank Kamaiko, a 21-year-old man from Greenwich Village claiming to be a member of the Jewish Defense League, hijacked a helicopter from the East 34th Street Heliport and demanded $2 million in ransom. After landing on top of the Pan Am Building, the pilot tried to escape and Kamaiko shot him in the arm. The other hostage inside the helicopter disarmed the hijacker, and police took him into custody.
- The New York City Council defeated a homosexual rights bill by a vote of 22 to 19. Politicians attributed the bill's defeat to opposition by the Roman Catholic Archdiocese of New York.
- Born:
  - Ken Jennings, American game show contestant and TV host, known for Jeopardy!; in Edmonds, Washington
  - Jewel (stage name for Jewel Kilcher), American singer known for "You Were Meant for Me"; in Payson, Utah
- Died: Leif Høegh, 78, Norwegian shipowner, founder and chairman of Leif Höegh & Co

== May 24, 1974 (Friday) ==
- In the Philippines, the coronation of Mohammed Mahakuttah Abdullah Kiram as the Sultan of Sulu took place with approval by the government of President Ferdinand Marcos, who issued Memorandum Order No. 427. The Sultan's 7-year-old son, Muedzul Lail Tan Kiram, was recognized as Crown Prince during the ceremony. Official recognition of the Sultanate of Sulu as a limited self-governing territory would end with Mahakuttah's death in 1986.
- In Poland, the collapse of an underground coal mine in Piekary killed five miners. Three others were rescued.
- Born:
  - Magnus Manske (born Heinrich Magnus Manske), German biochemist and software developer who created MediaWiki for the Wikimedia Foundation; in Cologne, North Rhine-Westphalia, West Germany
  - Florence Baverel-Robert (born Florence Baverel), French biathlete and 2006 Olympic gold medalist; in Pontarlier, Doubs département
  - Dash Mihok, American TV actor known for Ray Donovan; in New York City
- Died:
  - Duke Ellington, 75, American jazz pianist and bandleader
  - Clyde Cowan, 54, American physicist, co-discoverer of the neutrino, died of a heart attack.
  - Max Ritter, 87, German Olympic swimmer, who was co-founder in 1908 of the Fédération internationale de natation (FINA)

== May 25, 1974 (Saturday) ==
- Boxer Rodrigo Valdez of Colombia became the new World Boxing Council (WBC) middleweight champion, knocking out Bennie Briscoe of the U.S. in a bout at Monte Carlo in Monaco for the vacant WBC middleweight crown. World Boxing Association (WBA) champion Carlos Monzón had been stripped of his WBC title for earlier having refused to fight Valdez.
- Born:
  - Kevin Hartman, American Major League Soccer player, MLS Goalkeeper of the Year in 1999, with five caps for the U.S. national team; in Athens, Ohio
  - Miguel Tejada, Dominican Major League Baseball shortstop, 2002 American League MVP and 2004 major league RBI leader; in Baní
  - Germán Paoloski, Argentine journalist and TV host; in Coronel Suárez, Buenos Aires Province
- Died: Donald Crisp, 93, English-American film actor, 1942 Academy Award winner for Best Supporting Actor for How Green Was My Valley

== May 26, 1974 (Sunday) ==
- In the 1974 Luxembourg general election, the representation of the Christian Social People's Party (CSV) in the Chamber of Deputies decreased from 21 out of 56 seats to 18 out of 59. Prime Minister Pierre Werner, a member of the CSV, and his coalition cabinet resigned the following day.
- Almost 800 girls were injured, 14 seriously, in a human crush at a David Cassidy concert at London's White City Stadium. One Cassidy fan, 14-year-old Bernadette Whelan, became comatose from traumatic asphyxiation, and died of her injuries four days later.
- The collapse of an apartment building, under construction in Kuwait City, took place while 150 workers were inside as concrete was being poured on the sixth floor. Ten injured people were rescued, and four bodies were recovered, but police said that "scores of others were feared missing."
- Johnny Rutherford won the 1974 Indianapolis 500 at the Indianapolis Motor Speedway.
- Swedish driver Ronnie Peterson won the 1974 Monaco Grand Prix on the Circuit de Monaco.
- The Jorkanden mountain peak, 21,237 feet (6,473 m) high, was climbed for the first time. A team from the Indo-Tibetan Border Police scaled the highest of the peaks in the Kinner Kailash mountain range of the Greater Himalayas, located in India's Himachal Pradesh state.
- Born: Lars Frölander, Swedish swimmer and 2000 Olympic gold medalist in the 100m butterfly; in Boden, Norrbotten County
- Died:
  - Stewart Alsop, 60, American newspaper columnist, died of acute myeloblastic leukemia.
  - Kitty Gordon (stage name for Constance Minnie Blades), 96, English silent film star in the 1910s

== May 27, 1974 (Monday) ==
- The nationwide railway strike in India was abruptly ended by the Action Committee of the All India Railwaymen's Federation (AIRF), 20 days after its start. Over three weeks, more than 30,000 union members had been arrested under India's preventive detention law, including AIRF president George Fernandes. The Indian government began releasing prisoners the next day.
- Valéry Giscard d'Estaing was inaugurated as President of France at the Élysée Palace. His four-minute inaugural address was one of the briefest in history, and had only 12 sentences. Five hours later, Giscard d'Estaing appointed Jacques Chirac, the Minister of the Interior, as Prime Minister.
- In Boulder, Colorado, the murder of six Hispanic-American residents began with the explosion of a bomb planted in the car of lawyer Reyes Martinez at Chautauqua Park. Martinez, his girlfriend Uma Jaakola and her friend Neva Romero were all killed in the blast. Two days later another car bomb exploded in the parking lot of a Burger King restaurant that had closed for the night, killing Florencio Granado, Heriberto Teran and Francisco Dougherty. Another person, Antonio Alcantar Jr., who was standing outside the car, survived but lost a leg. Nearly 50 years later, no suspect had been arrested for the killing of "Los Seis de Boulder" (Spanish for "The Boulder Six").
- In Brazil, 13 of the 14 people aboard a boat on the Parana River were killed when the watercraft capsized in the river, infested with piranhas.
- Barbara Forrest, 20, was raped and strangled in Pype Hayes Park, Erdington, Birmingham, England. Forrest's co-worker Michael Ian Thornton was charged with her murder but would be acquitted due to lack of evidence. In a bizarre coincidence, the murder of Mary Ashford, which led to the Ashford v Thornton criminal case, also took place in Pype Hayes Park on May 27, 1817, 157 years to the day before Forrest's murder. In each case, a suspect with the surname Thornton was acquitted of the crime.
- Funeral services for Duke Ellington attracted 12,500 people to New York City's Cathedral of St. John the Divine, with the Suffragan Bishop of New York presiding. McHenry Boatwright, Ella Fitzgerald, Earl Hines, Ray Nance, Lou Rawls, Joe Williams, and Mary Lou Williams performed during the service. Present also were Pearl Bailey (representing President Nixon), Count Basie and Jack Dempsey.
- Born:
  - Sébastien Foucan, French founder of freerunning and developer of the sport of parkour; in Paris
  - Marjorie Taylor Greene, American conservative politician and conspiracy theorist, U.S. Representative for Georgia since 2021; in Milledgeville, Georgia
  - Dr. Margaret "Mags" Portman, British physician and developer of preventative treatment for HIV using the technique of pre-exposure prophylaxis; in Leeds (d. 2019 from mesothelioma)
  - Arbi Barayev, Chechen terrorist and leader of the Special Purpose Islamic Regiment; in Alkhan-Kala, Checheno-Ingush Autonomous Soviet Socialist Republic, Soviet Union (killed in gun battle, 2001)
  - Gürkan Uygun, Turkish TV actor known for 10 seasons of Kurtlar Vadisi (Valley of the Wolves); in İzmit, Kocaeli Province
- Died: Kurt Wiese, 87, German-born American children's book author and illustrator, known for the pictures in 300 books, including the Freddy the Pig series

== May 28, 1974 (Tuesday) ==
- In Italy, a time bomb planted by the Ordine Nuovo right-wing terrorist group killed eight people and injured 102 at an anti-Fascist rally in Brescia.
- The short-lived Northern Ireland Executive, the 11-member bipartisan government of Northern Ireland since January 1, collapsed along with the Northern Ireland Assembly as Chief Executive Brian Faulkner resigned. Faulkner's departure came 13 days after a general strike of union members had been called to put an end to the Sunningdale Agreement of December 9, that allowed Irish nationalists to join in sharing power with the Unionists who favored maintaining Northern Ireland as a part of the United Kingdom. The Executive had been composed of six members of Faulkner's Ulster Unionist Party and four members of the nationalist Social Democratic and Labour Party (SDLP).
- The Magic Show, a one-act Broadway musical built around the act of illusionist and stage magician Doug Henning (who could neither sing nor dance), premiered at the Cort Theatre for the first of 1,920 performances, running until December 31, 1978.

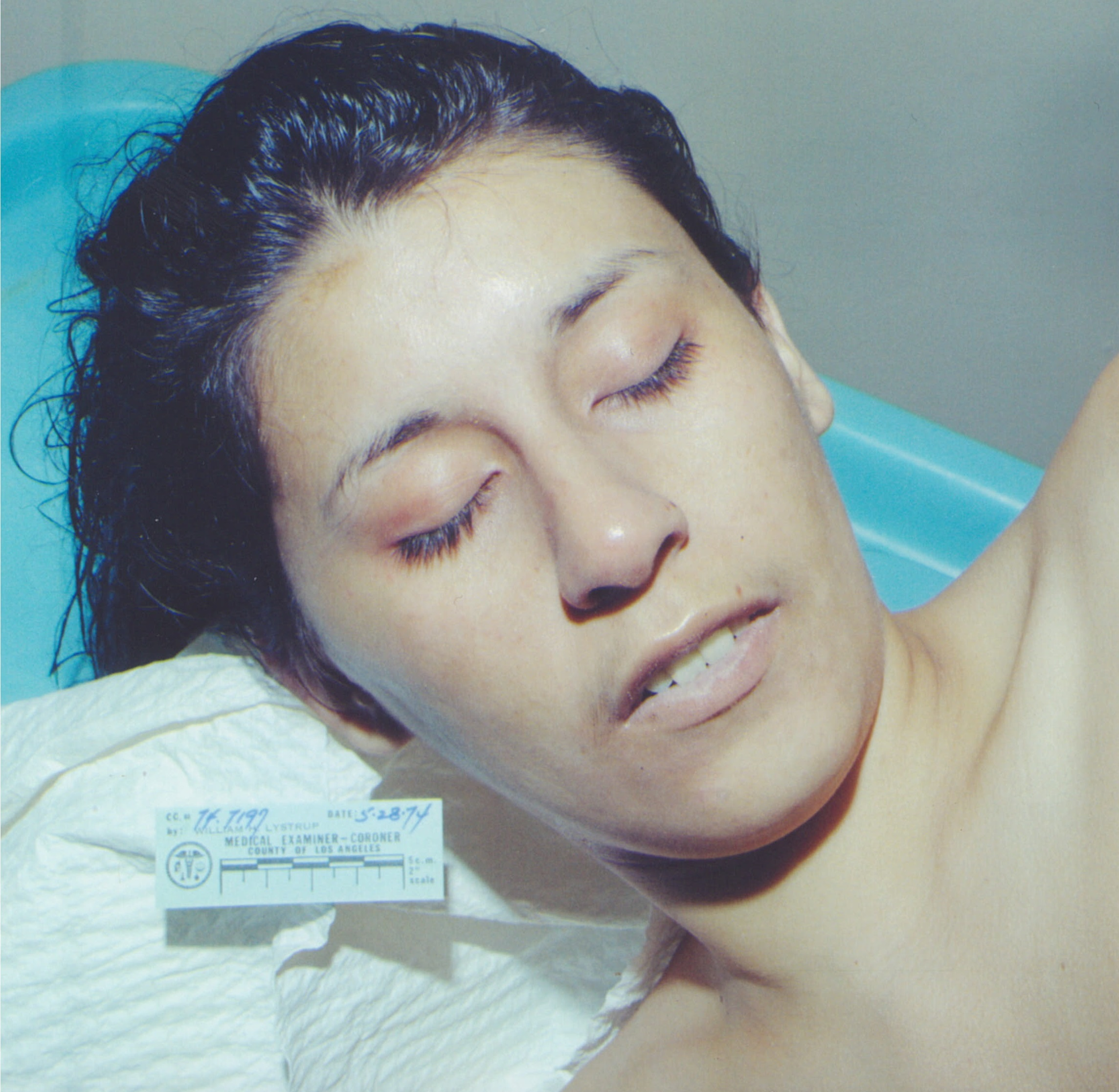
The Long Beach Jane Doe

- In Long Beach, California, a young woman later known as the Long Beach Jane Doe was raped and strangled to death. In May 2013, Gary Stamp, then 61, was arrested and confessed to the murder, but the victim's identity remains unknown. Stamp died of cancer in January 2014.
- Born: Misbah-ul-Haq, Pakistani cricketer with 166 Test matches and 142 ODIs for the Pakistan national team; in Mianwali, Punjab, Pakistan

== May 29, 1974 (Wednesday) ==
- The United States announced that Secretary of State Henry Kissinger had persuaded representatives of both Israel and Syria to reach an agreement on separation of their troops and a pullback within the Golan Heights.
- Lightning struck and killed four teenage girls, ranging in age from 14 to 15, in the St. Louis suburb of Manchester, Missouri, who were on their way home on the last day of classes at John F. Kennedy Catholic High School.
- France's President Giscard announced an immediate ban on government wiretapping and restraints against the press, and said that he would work toward welcoming political refugees. Giscard told the first meeting of his cabinet, "We are here to change France. France is a liberal country and we must set our sights even more firmly in that direction."
- French publisher Maurice Girodias was ordered to leave the U.S. after he had announced that he planned to publish a book titled President Kissinger. The Immigration and Naturalization Service had received an anonymous complaint that permission for Girodias to remain in the U.S. had expired in January.
- The UEFA Cup, a knockout tournament for the winners of the cup-winning soccer football teams in Europe, was won by Feyenoord, the 1974 champion of the Netherlands' KNVB Eredivisie, after the team had played to a 2–2 draw with Tottenham Hotspur (the 1973 English League Cup winner) in the first leg of the two-game final on May 21 in London. With the champion determined by the aggregate score of the two games, the winner of the second leg would win the UEFA Cup. Playing at home in Rotterdam, Feyenoord won, 2 to 0 on goals by Wim Rijsbergen and Peter Ressel, for an aggregate score of 4 to 2 overall.
- SETA, a Finnish LGBT rights organisation, was founded in Helsinki.
- Born:
  - Steve Cardenas, American martial artist and TV actor; in Hampton, Virginia
  - Aaron McGruder, American writer, comic strip artist known for The Boondocks; in Chicago

== May 30, 1974 (Thursday) ==
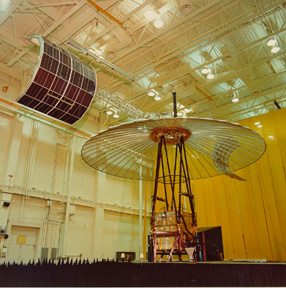
ATS-6

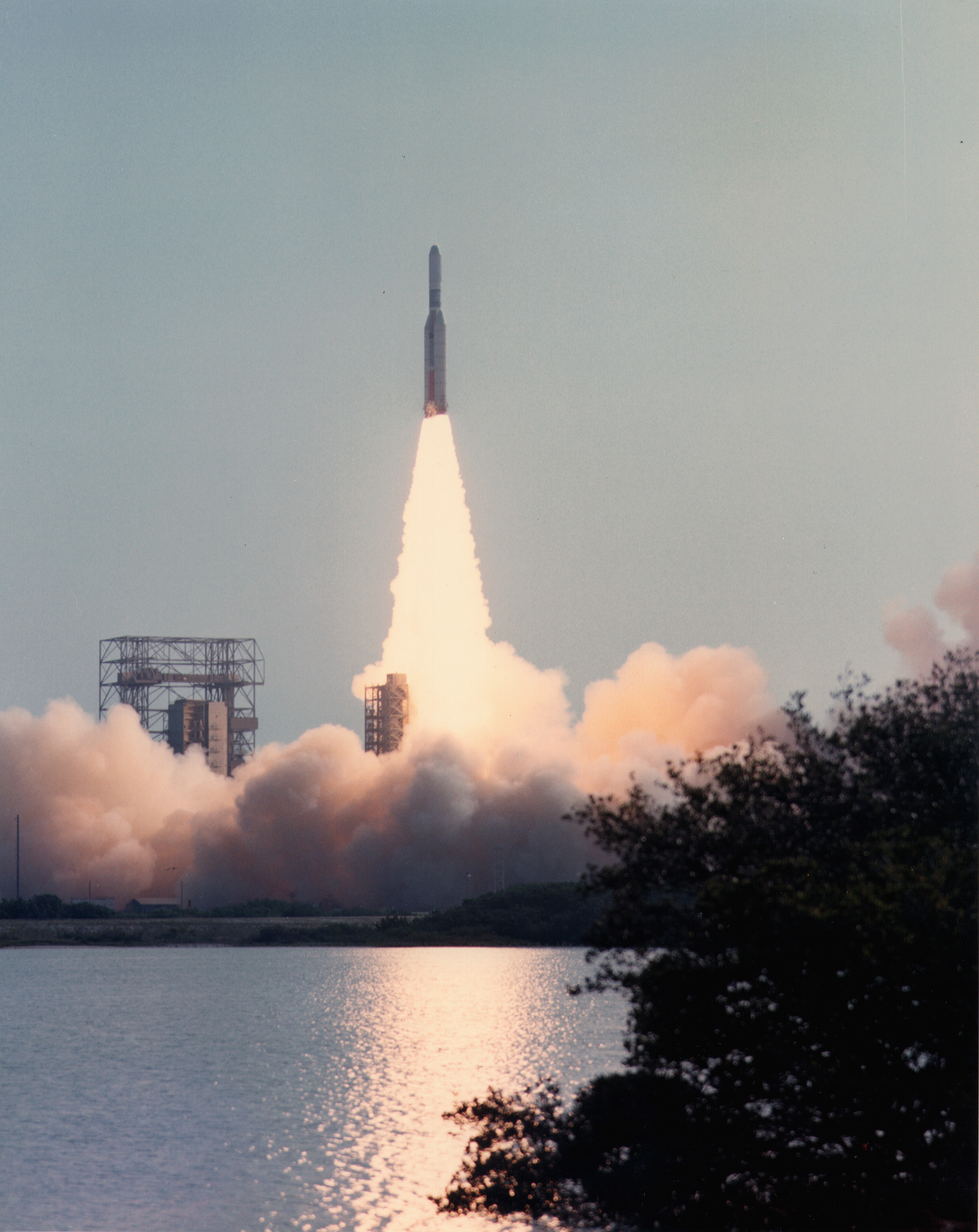
Launch of ATS-6

- NASA launched India's ATS-6, sixth of the Applications Technology Satellites, the world's first direct broadcast satellite, and the most powerful communications satellite launched up to that time.
- Elections were held for white voters in South Africa for 44 of the 54 seats in the South African senate. The elections for the 171-seats House of Assembly had taken place on April 24. The National Party of Prime Minister B. J. Vorster won 32 of the elected seats, and the United Party of De Villiers Graaff won 12 seats. The National Party had nine of the 10 non-elected seats, for 41 of 54 overall, and the United Party just one, for 13 of 54.
- The Aboriginal Tent Embassy, erected on the grounds of Australia's Parliament House in Canberra on January 26, 1972, was destroyed in a storm, but would be re-established on October 30, 1974.
- Born:
  - Andry Rajoelina, President of Madagascar 2009–2014 and 2019–2023; in Antsirabe, Malagasy Republic
  - Shin Ha-kyun, South Korean TV actor, star of Less Than Evil and Brain; in Seoul
  - Vigor Bovolenta, Italian volleyball player for the national team which won five gold medals; in Contarina, Province of Rovigo (d. 2012, heart attack)
  - Kostas Chalkias, Greek footballer and goalkeeper with 32 caps for the Greece national team; in Larissa
- Died: Edward K. Gaylord, 101, American newspaper publisher of The Daily Oklahoman

== May 31, 1974 (Friday) ==
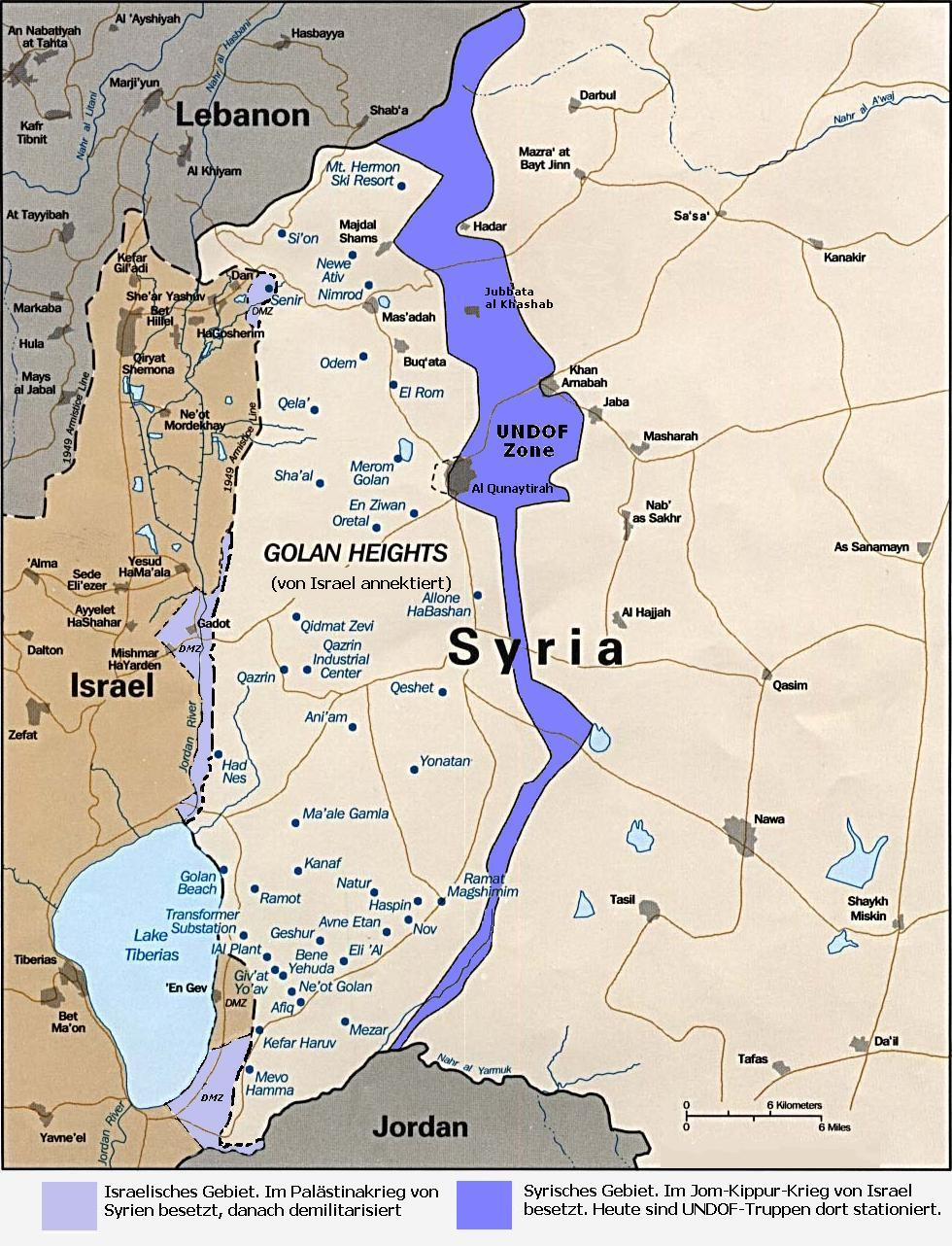
The Purple Line Zone separating Israeli and Syrian forces in the Golan Heights

- The Agreement on Disengagement between Israel and Syria, negotiated by U.S. Secretary of State Henry Kissinger, for the separation of the two nations' military forces in the Golan Heights, was signed at the Palace of Nations in Geneva, by Major General Herzl Shafir of Israel and Brigadier General Adnan Tayara of Syria. The firing of artillery on the Israel-Syria front ended at 1:15 pm Israeli time. The United Nations Security Council adopted Resolution 350, establishing the United Nations Disengagement Observer Force (UNDOF) to monitor the ceasefire.
- The Home Office of the United Kingdom announced that the British penal system abolished the traditional "bread and water" diet that had been used to punish infractions of prison discipline, replacing the penalty with loss of earnings or the forfeiture of reductions of sentences for good behavior.
- Born:
  - Jim Carey, American ice hockey goaltender, winner of the National Hockey League's Vezina Trophy in 1996; in Dorchester, Massachusetts
  - Ara Celi, American film and television actress; in El Paso, Texas
  - Kenan Doğulu, Turkish pop musician known for "Çakkıdı"; in Istanbul
  - Zsolt Erdei, Hungarian professional and Olympic boxer, 1997 Olympic middleweight champion; in Budapest
  - Adrian Tomine, American graphic novelist; in Sacramento, California
- Died:
  - Adelle Davis, 70, American writer and nutritionist described as "the most famous nutritionist in the early to mid-20th century", died of bone marrow cancer.
  - Ski Hi Lee (ring name of Robert E. Leedy), 53, Canadian professional wrestler who had acromegaly (at 6 feet 7 inches (2.01 m) the tallest man in the sport)
  - Harry Primrose, 6th Earl of Rosebery, 92, British liberal politician, elected to serve in the House of Commons 1906 to 1910, later elevated to the House of Lords in 1929
  - Jim Prendergast, 60, British Communist and civil rights activist, died from injuries sustained when he fell down the stairs in front of his home.
