= Izu Peninsula earthquake =

Izu Peninsula earthquake may refer to:

- 1930 North Izu earthquake
- 1974 Izu Peninsula earthquake
