= List of earthquakes in 1974 =

Earthquakes in 1974
Approximate epicenters of the earthquakes in 1974
- 4.0–5.9 magnitude
- 6.0–6.9 magnitude
- 7.0–7.9 magnitude
- 8.0+ magnitude
- Strongest: Peru, off the coast of Lima (Magnitude 8.1) October 3
- Deadliest: China, Sichuan Province (Magnitude 6.8) May 10 20,000 deaths
- Total fatalities: 25,442

Number by magnitude
- 9.0+: 0
- 4.0–4.9: 2619

This is a list of earthquakes in 1974. Only magnitude 6.0 or greater earthquakes appear on the list. Lower magnitude events are included if they have caused death, injury or damage. Events which occurred in remote areas will be excluded from the list as they wouldn't have generated significant media interest. All dates are listed according to UTC time. Maximum intensities are indicated on the Mercalli intensity scale and are sourced from United States Geological Survey (USGS) ShakeMap data. Activity was once again below average with 11 events reaching magnitude 7+. The largest came in October in Peru when a magnitude 7.6 earthquake struck Lima. Other magnitude 7.0+ events shook the Caribbean, China and the southwest Pacific Islands. Two events dominated the 25,000 deaths during 1974. China was struck by a magnitude 6.8 event in May with upwards of 20,000 deaths. At the end of the year, Pakistan was struck by a modest 6.2 magnitude earthquake causing 5,300 deaths. Gabon in central Africa was hit by a rare earthquake in September.

== Overall ==
=== By death toll ===
Rank	Death toll	Magnitude	Location	MMI	Depth (km)	Date
1	20,000	6.8	China, Sichuan Province	VII (Very strong)	11.0	May 10
2	5,300	6.2	Pakistan, Kyhber Pakhtunkhwa	VIII (Severe)	22.0	December 28
3	78	8.1	Peru, off the coast of Lima	IX (Violent)	13.0	October 3
4	30	6.5	Japan, off the south coast of Honshu	IX (Violent)	2.0	May 8
5	11	7.3	Panama, Darien Province	VIII (Severe)	12.0	July 13
6	10	6.3	Peru, Lima Region	VI (Strong)	98.0	January 5

- Note: At least 10 casualties

=== By magnitude ===
Rank	Magnitude	Death toll	Location	MMI	Depth (km)	Date
1	7.6	78	Peru, off the coast of Lima	IX (Violent)	13.0	October 3
2	7.5	0	Antigua and Barbuda	VIII (Severe)	47.0	October 8
= 3	7.3	11	Panama, Darien Province	VIII (Severe)	12.0	July 13
= 3	7.3	0	China, western Xinjiang Province	VIII (Severe)	9.0	August 11
= 4	7.2	0	New Hebrides, Vanuatu	VII (Very strong)	34.0	January 10
= 4	7.2	0	New Zealand, Kermadec Islands	( )	33.0	July 2
= 4	7.2	0	Australia, D'Entrecasteaux Islands, Papua New Guinea	V (Moderate)	48.0	October 23
= 4	7.2	0	Peru, off the coast of Lima	VI (Strong)	6.0	November 9
= 5	7.1	0	United Kingdom, Solomon Islands	IX (Violent)	40.0	February 1
= 5	7.1	0	Chile, Araucania Region	VIII (Severe)	36.0	August 18
6	7.0	0	United Kingdom, Solomon Islands	VIII (Severe)	34.0	January 31

- Note: At least 7.0 magnitude

== Notable events ==
=== January ===
January
- Strongest: 7.3 M_{w}, Solomon Islands
- Deadliest: 6.3 M_{w}, Peru; 10 deaths
- Total fatalities: 10

Number by magnitude
- 8.0–8.9: 0
- 7.0–7.9: 2
- 6.0–6.9: 9
- 5.0–5.9: 124
- 4.0–4.9: 180

Date	Country and location	M_{w}	Depth (km)	MMI	Notes	Casualties	
Date	Country and location	M_{w}	Depth (km)	MMI	Notes	Dead	Injured
2	Chile, Antofagasta Region	7.0	105.0	VIII	Some damage to buildings.		3
5	Peru, Lima Region	6.6	98.0	VI	Ten people were killed and at least 101 were injured. Major damage in the Lima–Yauyos area.	10	101+
7	Argentina, Tucumán	6.0	10.0	VI			
8	Southwest Indian Ridge	6.1	10.0				
10	New Hebrides, Vanuatu	6.7	34.0	VII	Aftershock of December 28, 1973 event.		
10	New Hebrides, Vanuatu	6.3	35.0		Aftershock of December 28, 1973 event.		
24	Japan offshore, Hokkaido	6.5	30.0				
25	Northern Mariana Islands, Pagan region	6.0	138.6				
30	Indonesia, Aru Islands	6.4	30.0	V			
31	United Kingdom, Solomon Islands	7.3	30.0	VI	A 3.1–4.6 m (10–15 ft) tsunami was recorded on Choiseul Island.		
31	Papua New Guinea, Bougainville	6.2	62.0	V			

=== February ===
February
- Strongest: 7.4 M_{w} United Kingdom, Solomon Islands
- Deadliest: 5.2 M_{w} Turkey; 2 deaths
- Total fatalities: 2

Number by magnitude
- 8.0–8.9: 0
- 7.0–7.9: 1
- 6.0–6.9: 9
- 5.0–5.9: 127
- 4.0–4.9: 175

Date	Country and location	M_{w}	Depth (km)	MMI	Notes	Casualties	
Date	Country and location	M_{w}	Depth (km)	MMI	Notes	Dead	Injured
1	Turkey, İzmir Province	5.4	29.0	V	Two people were killed and 20 were injured.	2	20
1	United Kingdom, Solomon Islands	7.4	40.0	VI	Shaking and tsunami damage on Choiseul and Shortland islands.		
2	Indonesia, Maluku	6.0	25.0				
6	United States, Unimak Island, Alaska	6.4	10.0	V			
8	Vanuatu, Tafea	6.0	17.2				
8	Indonesia, Gorontalo	6.0	132.2				
16	India, Andaman Islands	6.1	25.0	VI			
19	Philippines, Luzon	6.4	17.0	VII			
22	Japan, Wakayama	6.6	390.3				
28	New Zealand, off the north coast of North Island	6.5	20.0				
28	Costa Rica, off the west coast	6.3	46.0	VI			

=== March ===
March
- Strongest: 7.0 M_{w} Fiji
- Total fatalities: 0

Number by magnitude
- 8.0–8.9: 0
- 7.0–7.9: 1
- 6.0–6.9: 10
- 5.0–5.9: 95
- 4.0–4.9: 190

Date	Country and location	M_{w}	Depth (km)	MMI	Notes	Casualties	
Date	Country and location	M_{w}	Depth (km)	MMI	Notes	Dead	Injured
3	Japan, Chiba	6.0	50.0	IV			
3	New Hebrides, Vanuatu	6.1	17.0	VI			
6	Nicaragua, Managua	6.1	122.7	IV			
6	Banda Sea	6.3	10.0				
9	United Kingdom, Solomon Islands	6.6	30.0	V			
11	Soviet Union, Kuril Islands	6.1	156.0				
14	Vanuatu	6.1	44.4				
18	Samoa	6.2	32.4				
23	Fiji	7.0	521.1				
23	Vanuatu	6.2	14.4				
24	Guam	6.2	70.2				

=== April ===
April
- Strongest: 6.1 M_{w} Tonga
- Deadliest: 5.0 M_{w} Colombia; 4 deaths
- Total fatalities: 4

Number by magnitude
- 8.0–8.9: 0
- 7.0–7.9: 0
- 6.0–6.9: 1
- 5.0–5.9: 95
- 4.0–4.9: 221

Date	Country and location	M_{w}	Depth (km)	MMI	Notes	Casualties	
Date	Country and location	M_{w}	Depth (km)	MMI	Notes	Dead	Injured
18	Colombia, Santander Department	5.2	24.0	V	4 people were killed and 10 were injured. Some damage was caused.	4	10
22	China, Jiangsu Province	5.5	33.0	VII	Minor damage.		
27	Tonga, south of	6.1	45.0				

=== May ===
May
- Strongest: 6.7 M_{w} China
- Deadliest: 6.7 M_{w} China; 20,000 deaths
- Total fatalities: 20,030

Number by magnitude
- 8.0–8.9: 0
- 7.0–7.9: 0
- 6.0–6.9: 14
- 5.0–5.9: 101
- 4.0–4.9: 249

Date	Country and location	M_{w}	Depth (km)	MMI	Notes	Casualties	
Date	Country and location	M_{w}	Depth (km)	MMI	Notes	Dead	Injured
7	Wallis and Futuna	6.1	35.0				
8	Japan, off the south coast of Honshu	6.4	11.2	IX	Main article: 1974 Izu Peninsula earthquake	30	102
9	Indian Ocean, Prince Edward Islands region	6.2	15.0				
10	Pacific Ocean, central East Pacific Rise	6.1	15.0				
10	China, Sichuan Province	6.7	11.0	VII	Main article: 1974 Zhaotong earthquake	20,000	
11	Indonesia, North Sulawesi	6.3	45.0				
11	Northern Mariana Islands	6.5	35.0				
11	South Georgia and the South Sandwich Islands	6.0	10.0				
15	Soviet Union, Kuril Islands, Russia	6.4	60.5	V			
17	Peru, Junin Region	6.1	111.0	IV			
17	Japan, Okinawa	6.0	25.0				
17	Indonesia, West Java	6.4	131.0	IV			
26	New Hebrides, Vanuatu	6.2	13.0	IV	Foreshock.		
31	Mexico, Gulf of California	6.3	33.0	V			

=== June ===
June
- Strongest: 6.1 2 events reached this magnitude.
- Deadliest: 6.1 M_{w} Venezuela; 5 deaths
- Total fatalities: 5

Number by magnitude
- 8.0–8.9: 0
- 7.0–7.9: 0
- 6.0–6.9: 2
- 5.0–5.9: 122
- 4.0–4.9: 204

Date	Country and location	M_{w}	Depth (km)	MMI	Notes	Casualties	
Date	Country and location	M_{w}	Depth (km)	MMI	Notes	Dead	Injured
12	Venezuela, Sucre (state)	6.1	34.0	VIII	5 people were killed and at least 1 person was injured. Some damage was caused with costs reaching $2.5 million (1974 rate).	5	1+
20	Yugoslavia, Bosnia and Herzegovina	5.1	33.0	VII	Some damage was caused.		
27	Australia, off the east coast of New Britain, Papua New Guinea	6.1	70.0	V			

=== July ===
July
- Strongest: 7.3 M_{w} Panama
- Deadliest: 7.3 M_{w} Panama; 11 deaths
- Total fatalities: 11

Number by magnitude
- 8.0–8.9: 0
- 7.0–7.9: 2
- 6.0–6.9: 4
- 5.0–5.9: 121
- 4.0–4.9: 286

Date	Country and location	M_{w}	Depth (km)	MMI	Notes	Casualties	
Date	Country and location	M_{w}	Depth (km)	MMI	Notes	Dead	Injured
1	Bolivia, Tarija Department	5.9	13.0	VI	Some damage was reported.		
2	New Zealand, Kermadec Islands	7.2	33.0				
3	New Zealand, Kermadec Islands	6.6	33.0		Aftershock.		
4	Mongolia, Govi-Altai Province	6.7	33.0	VIII			
8	Japan, off the east coast of Honshu	6.0	35.0	IV			
13	Panama, Darien Province	7.3	12.0	VIII	11 people were killed and at least 1 person was injured. Some damage was caused.	11	1+
30	Afghanistan, Badakhshan Province	6.5	211.0	V			

=== August ===
August
- Strongest: 7.3 M_{w} China
- Deadliest: 5.6 M_{w} Japan; 2 deaths
- Total fatalities: 2

Number by magnitude
- 8.0–8.9: 0
- 7.0–7.9: 2
- 6.0–6.9: 2
- 5.0–5.9: 138
- 4.0–4.9: 274

Date	Country and location	M_{w}	Depth (km)	MMI	Notes	Casualties	
Date	Country and location	M_{w}	Depth (km)	MMI	Notes	Dead	Injured
3	Japan, Chiba Prefecture, Honshu	5.6	58.0	VI	2 people died and 17 were injured. Some damage was caused.	2	17
8	Taiwan, off the east coast of	6.0	32.0	V			
11	China, western Xinjiang Province	7.3	9.0	VIII			
11	Soviet Union, Osh Region, Kyrgyzstan	6.1	9.0	VII	Aftershock of China event.		
18	Chile, Araucania Region	7.1	36.0	VIII	Some damage was caused.		

=== September ===
September
- Strongest: 6.7 M_{w} Soviet Union, Russia
- Total fatalities: 0

Number by magnitude
- 8.0–8.9: 0
- 7.0–7.9: 0
- 6.0–6.9: 3
- 5.0–5.9: 96
- 4.0–4.9: 199

Date	Country and location	M_{w}	Depth (km)	MMI	Notes	Casualties	
Date	Country and location	M_{w}	Depth (km)	MMI	Notes	Dead	Injured
7	Indonesia, off the south coast of Java	6.5	33.0				
23	Gabon, Ogooue-Lolo Province	6.2	33.0	VIII	Some damage was caused.		
27	Soviet Union, Kuril Islands, Russia	6.7	43.0	VII			

=== October ===
October
- Strongest: 8.1 M_{w} Peru
- Deadliest: 8.1 M_{w} Peru; 78 deaths
- Total fatalities: 78

Number by magnitude
- 8.0–8.9: 1
- 7.0–7.9: 2
- 6.0–6.9: 3
- 5.0–5.9: 96
- 4.0–4.9: 242

Date	Country and location	M_{w}	Depth (km)	MMI	Notes	Casualties	
Date	Country and location	M_{w}	Depth (km)	MMI	Notes	Dead	Injured
3	Peru, off the coast of Lima	8.1	13.0	IX	Main article: 1974 Lima earthquake	78	2,414
8	Antigua and Barbuda	6.9	35.2	VIII	Main article: 1974 Lesser Antilles earthquake		4
10	Indonesia, southern Sumatra	6.1	80.1	VI			
23	Australia, D'Entrecasteaux Islands, Papua New Guinea	7.1	48.0	V			
27	New Hebrides, Vanuatu	6.3	36.0	VI			
29	Indonesia, Banda Sea	7.5	157.2				

=== November ===
November
- Strongest: 7.2 M_{w} Peru
- Total fatalities: 0

Number by magnitude
- 8.0–8.9: 0
- 7.0–7.9: 1
- 6.0–6.9: 4
- 5.0–5.9: 91
- 4.0–4.9: 171

Date	Country and location	M_{w}	Depth (km)	MMI	Notes	Casualties	
Date	Country and location	M_{w}	Depth (km)	MMI	Notes	Dead	Injured
8	Japan, off the south coast of Hokkaido	6.0	132.0	IV			
9	Peru, off the coast of Lima	7.2	6.0	VI	Aftershock of October 3 event.		
9	Indonesia, Sunda Strait	6.1	51.0	V			
19	Australia, off the west coast of New Ireland (island), Papua New Guinea	6.1	18.0	V			
20	New Hebrides, off the east coast of Espiritu Santo, Vanuatu	6.9	33.0	VII			

=== December ===
December
- Strongest: 6.9 M_{w} Indonesia
- Deadliest: 6.2 M_{w} Pakistan; 5,300 deaths
- Total fatalities: 5,300

Number by magnitude
- 8.0–8.9: 0
- 7.0–7.9: 0
- 6.0–6.9: 6
- 5.0–5.9: 99
- 4.0–4.9: 228

Date	Country and location	M_{w}	Depth (km)	MMI	Notes	Casualties	
Date	Country and location	M_{w}	Depth (km)	MMI	Notes	Dead	Injured
2	Iran, Hormozgan Province	5.4	36.0	V	Some damage was caused.		
3	Indonesia, Banda Sea	6.5	33.0	V			
4	Indonesia, south of Nias	6.9	20.0	VII			
5	Peru, Ucayali Region	6.0	162.0				
24	Indonesia, Mentawai Islands	6.8	33.0	VI			
28	Pakistan, Khyber Pakhtunkhwa	6.2	22.0	VIII	5,300 people were killed and 17,000 were hurt in the 1974 Pattan earthquake. Many homes were damaged or destroyed. Costs were $3.255 million (1974 rate).	5,300	17,000
31	Guatemala, off the west coast	6.1	39.0	VI			
