= 1974 Pattan earthquake =

- Location within Pakistan
- UTC time: 1974-12-28 12:11:48
- ISC event: 734833
- USGS-ANSS: ComCat
- Local date: December 28, 1974
- Local time: 17:11 PST
- Magnitude: M_{s} 6.2
- Depth: 22 km (14 mi)
- Epicenter: 35.0°N 72.8°E
- Max. intensity: MMI VIII (Severe)
- Casualties: 5,300 dead, 17,000 injured

The 1974 Pattan earthquake occurred in the rugged and isolated Hunza, Hazara and Swat districts of northern Pakistan at 12:11 UTC on 28 December 1974. The 6.2 surface-wave magnitude quake had a shallow focal depth of 22 km and was followed by numerous aftershocks. An official estimate of the number killed was 5,300 with approximately 17,000 injured, and around 4,400 homes were destroyed. A total of 97,000 were reported affected by the tremor. Most of the destruction was centered on the village of Pattan. The village was almost completely destroyed.

The epicentral region is characterized by steep-walled narrow canyons and valleys. Most of the population was concentrated along the rivers. Much of the destruction was caused by the numerous landslides and rockfalls which came tumbling down from high above. The main road leading into the area was blocked for about 25 miles (40 km) by landslides and rockfalls, hampering relief efforts. The government flew in emergency supplies by helicopter until the roads were reopened on 13 January.

The earthquake, which reached MMI V in Kabul, Afghanistan, affected some 1,000 square miles (2,600 km^{2}) of the Indus Valley region. Several nations contributed money and supplies to aid the inhabitants of the stricken area.

== See also ==
- List of earthquakes in 1974
- List of earthquakes in Pakistan

== Sources ==
- Earthquake information Bulletin, March–April 1975, Volume 7, Number 2
