= 1974 Lima earthquake =

1974 earthquake in Peru

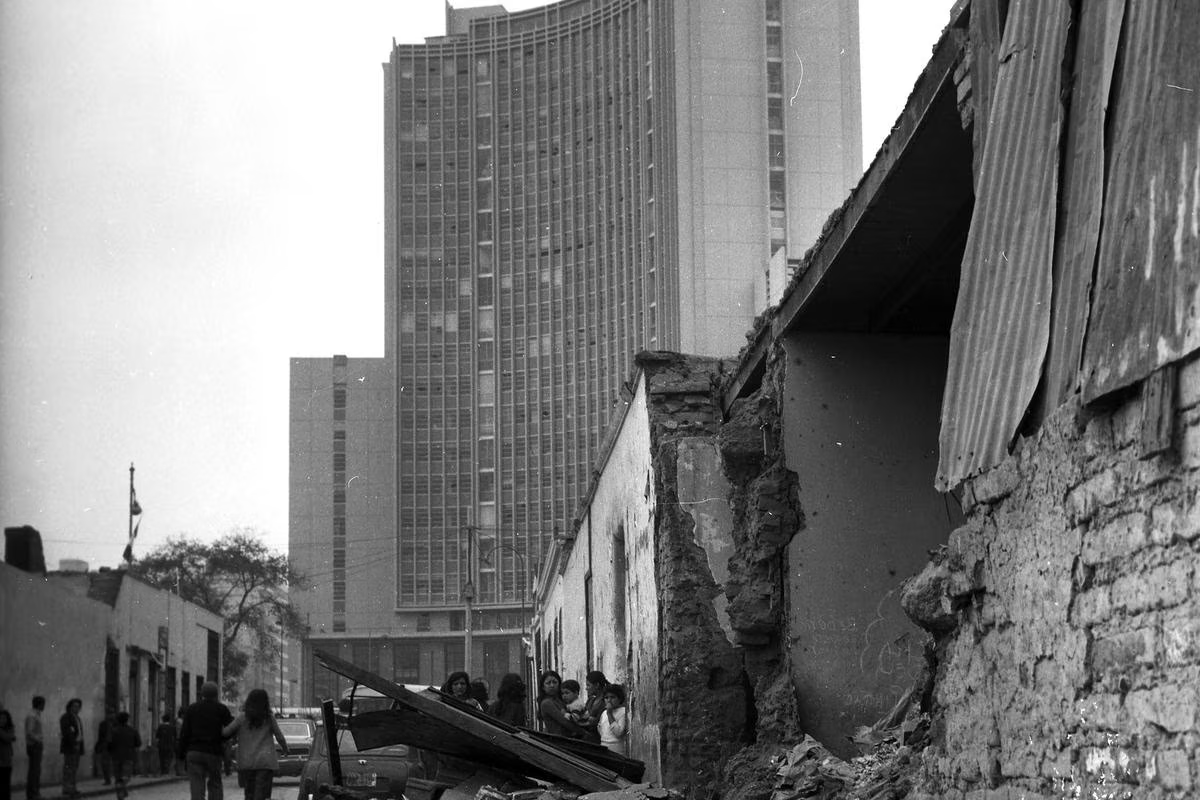
- House damage in Lima

- Location within Peru
- UTC time: 1974-10-03 14:21:31
- ISC event: 736021
- USGS-ANSS: ComCat
- Local date: October 3, 1974
- Local time: 09:21:31
- Magnitude: M_{w} 8.1
- Depth: 36 km (22 mi)
- Epicenter: 12.25°S 77.52°W
- Areas affected: Peru
- Max. intensity: MMI IX (Violent)
- Casualties: 78 killed, 2,400 injured

The 1974 Lima earthquake occurred on October 3 at 14:21 UTC (09:21 local time). It was located at about 80 kilometres (50 mi) southwest of Lima, Peru. The magnitude of the earthquake was put at 8.1 M_{w}, or M_{s} 7.8. The earthquake caused 78 deaths and left 2,400 injured.

== Background ==
The intensity around Lima was generally about MM V to VII, but the maximum reached IX. Two buildings of reinforced concrete collapsed in La Molina, where the intensity was MM VIII to IX. A four-story reinforced concrete building in Callao collapsed.

The largest aftershock occurred on November 9, 1974, at 12:59 UTC (07:59 local time) with a magnitude of M_{w} 7.1, or M_{s} 7.1. The November 9 aftershock was located at about 25 km south of the main shock.

== See also ==
- List of earthquakes in 1974
- List of earthquakes in Peru
