= 1974 Lesser Antilles earthquake =

Earthquake off the coast of Antigua, Lesser Antilles

- Location within the Caribbean Location within Antigua and Barbuda
- UTC time: 1974-10-08 09:50:58
- ISC event: 736214
- USGS-ANSS: ComCat
- Local date: October 8, 1974
- Local time: 05:50:58
- Magnitude: 6.9 M_{w}
- Depth: 35.2 km (22 mi)
- Epicenter: 17.3°N 62.0°W
- Type: Normal
- Total damage: Moderate
- Max. intensity: MMI VIII (Severe)
- Casualties: 4 injured

The 1974 Lesser Antilles earthquake occurred at 05:50:58 local time on October 8 with a moment magnitude of 6.9 and a maximum Mercalli intensity of VIII (Severe). Four people were injured in what the United States' National Geophysical Data Center called a moderately destructive event.

== Tectonic setting ==
While the northern and southern boundary of the Caribbean plate are complex and diffuse, with zones of seismicity stretching several hundred kilometers across, the eastern boundary is that of the Lesser Antilles subduction zone. This 850 km (530 mi) long subduction zone lacks a uniform curve and has an average dip of 50–60°. The largest known earthquake on the plate interface was a M7.5–8.0 event in 1843, but it did not generate a large tsunami. In opposition, the three largest events between 1950 and 1978 were intraplate normal faulting events.

== See also ==
- Lesser Antilles
- List of earthquakes in 1974
- List of earthquakes in the Caribbean
