= Kip Siegel =

- Siegel in 1944
- Born: Keeve Milton Siegel; January 9, 1924; New York City, U.S.
- Died: March 14, 1975 (aged 51); Washington, D.C., U.S.
- Education: Rensselaer Polytechnic Institute
- Scientific career
- Fields: Electrical engineering; Nuclear engineering
- Workplaces: University of Michigan; Oakland University; Conductron Corporation; KMS Industries; KMS Fusion

Keeve Milton "Kip" Siegel (January 9, 1924 – March 14, 1975) was an American physicist, electrical engineer and businessman. He was a professor of electrical engineering at the University of Michigan, and the founder of Conductron Corporation, a high-tech producer of electronic equipment which was absorbed by McDonnell Douglas Corporation; KMS Industries and KMS Fusion. KMS Fusion was the first private sector company to pursue controlled thermonuclear fusion energy production through use of laser technology.

Prior to his involvement in laser fusion, Siegel served as the founding director of University of Michigan's Radiation Laboratory from 1952 to 1961, and was known for his contributions to the radar cross section analysis of flying targets.

== Early life and academic career ==
Keeve Milton Siegel was born on January 9, 1924, in New York City to David Porter Siegel, Chief of the Criminal Division of the US Attorney's office for the Southern District of New York, and Rose Siegel (née Jelin). His uncle, Isaac Siegel, was a member of Congress.

He graduated from Rensselaer Polytechnic Institute in 1948 with a Bachelor of Science degree. He joined Michigan's Upper Atmospheric Physics Group, which had been set up that year, as a research associate and became the head of the group a year later. He continued in this position until early 1952, by which time he had completed his Master of Science degree from RPI (1950). Due to the importance of their work to what would become NORAD, it was renamed the Theory and Analysis Group in early 1952. Siegel chaired the Organizing Committee of the URSI-sponsored Symposium on Electromagnetic Wave Theory held at the University of Michigan, 20–25 June 1955. In June 1957, he became professor of electrical engineering. At the end of 1960 he started a company, Conductron, initially while continuing to head the laboratory, but resigned as head later in 1961.

== KMS Industries ==
In 1967, Siegel left the University of Michigan when he accepted an appointment as visiting professor at Oakland University. Not long afterwards, after disagreeing on strategy with McDonnell-Douglas, the majority stockholder, he also resigned from Conductron. He then founded KMS Industries, taking with him some Conductron personnel. In the early 1970s he established the subsidiary KMS Fusion, to pursue the development of nuclear fusion as an energy source.

In the early 1970s, Siegel's focus became the successful achievement of laser fusion. Until that time, efforts to achieve fusion had principally used the process of confining a hydrogen plasma magnetically to reach the needed temperature and density for long enough to make hydrogen nuclei fuse. Siegel chose a different approach: using multiple high energy lasers from several directions focused simultaneously on hydrogen pellets so that the pellet reels inward under the blow, forcing some of the nuclei to fuse. The idea was not new, but KMS developed a number of new techniques, including hitting the pellet symmetrically, producing the fuel pellets and diagnosing the neutron flow.

=== Opposition ===
Siegel's independent pursuit of nuclear fusion was not welcomed by either the federal government or the rest of the defense industry in which he had spent the better part of his career. The company encountered heavy opposition from both the Atomic Energy Commission and from large federal weapons laboratories. Many people in both government and scientific sectors were bitterly opposed to the operation of such a fundamental and important energy program in the private sector. The long and, eventually, successful campaign of the AEC against KMS Fusion became a matter of public record. (Fortune, Dec. 1974).

However, Siegel believed in "the lesson of the Cavendish Laboratory (Cambridge, England), where a few bright people outinvented the world for a long period...with wires and chewing gum." The personnel at KMS Fusion included leading American scientists, including Keith Brueckner and Robert Hofstadter.

On May 1, 1974, KMS Fusion achieved the first laser-induced fusion with a deuterium–tritium pellet, documented by Hofstadter's nuclear emulsion detectors, which could detect neutrons. The neutron flow registered by scientists at KMS Fusion was still removed from a net energy flow by a factor of more than 10 million, and they did not pretend otherwise; but they had achieved controlled thermonuclear fusion, a first, as was subsequently acknowledged by ERDA itself (formerly, the AEC) and scientists working in the field, including Soviet and French laser-fusion workers.

=== Financial difficulties and demise ===
In the drive to succeed with laser fusion, Siegel cannibalized the other KMS divisions and invested his own personal fortune. The company's financing became tenuous, while the hostility of the critics of his efforts created an atmosphere where it was difficult, if not impossible, to secure additional outside financing.

At this time, KMS Fusion was indisputably the most advanced laser-fusion laboratory in the world. However, outright harassment from the AEC only increased after the announcement of these results. According to one source in the faculty of the University of Michigan, the campaign against KMS Fusion culminated with a massive incursion into the KMS Fusion facilities by federal agents, who effectively put an end to its operations by confiscating essential materials on the grounds that, inter alia, all information concerning the production of nuclear energy is classified information which belongs exclusively to the federal government.

== Personal life ==
Siegel married Ruth E. Boerker in June 1951. The couple had two sons. He was Jewish and served as the former president of the Beth Israel Congregation in Ann Arbor.

Siegel died on March 14, 1975 at George Washington University Hospital in Washington, D.C., following the complications of a stroke he had while testifying before the United States Congressional Joint Committee on Atomic Energy in defense of his laser fusion research.
