= KMS Fusion =

Company in Ann Arbor, United States

- Industry: fusion power
- Predecessor: KMS Industries
- Founded: 1967; 59 years ago
- Founder: Kip Siegel
- Defunct: 1990; 36 years ago
- Headquarters: Ann Arbor, Michigan, United States
- Number of employees: c. 200 (1990)

KMS Fusion was the first private company to attempt to produce a fusion reactor using the inertial confinement fusion (ICF) approach. The basic concept, developed in 1969 by Keith Brueckner, was to infuse small glass spheres with a fuel gas and then compress the sphere using lasers until they reached the required temperature and pressures. In May 1974 they demonstrated neutron output consistent with small levels of fusion events in a D-T filled target, the first published success for this technique.

Unknown to the company when they proposed the idea in 1969, several of the US Atomic Energy Commission (AEC) labs were also working on the same concept, which at that time was highly classified. The labs continually agitated against KMS's efforts. When the successful tests met the lab's predictions, far below KMS's own predictions, the AEC used the success as proof their designs were better. The company attempted to arrange funding from the AEC for continued development, but the company founder, Kip Siegel, died in 1975 while testifying to congress on the topic.

The company continued on mainline ICF for the next several years, first using Siegel's life insurance policy and then funding from the AEC. By the late 1970s, the programs simulating the ICF process demonstrated much larger lasers were needed, and KMS's continued funding into the 1980s was related almost entirely to fuel pellet fabrication and expertise in handling tritium. In 1991, this program moved to General Atomic in California and KMS closed.

== History ==
=== KMS Industries ===
Kip Siegel started KMS Industries on 8 February 1967. Siegel had previously started Conductron to develop side-looking radar but the company become better known for the development of holography. Siegel sold Conductron to McDonnell-Douglas in 1967 and almost immediately began arguing with their management over the future of the division. He quit and formed KMS. Using the money from the sale of Conductron, he purchased several companies and formed a mini-conglomerate.

Siegel also formed a research division in El Segundo, California, and hired Keith Brueckner, one of the founders of the physics department at UC San Diego, to run it on a consulting basis. Brueckner also consulted for a number of other organizations, including the Department of Defense and with the Atomic Energy Commission's (AEC) magnetic confinement fusion program.

=== Initial idea ===
As part of his work with the AEC, Brueckner was able to travel to the 1968 meeting of fusion researchers in Novosibirsk. Today this meeting is known as the coming-out party for the tokamak, although at the time it was not considered terribly important. Many other novel fusion concepts were also presented at this meeting. Among these were Soviet experiments using lasers to directly heat gaseous fuels to fusion temperatures, tens of millions of degrees. British, Italian and French teams also reported on similar experiments, with both the Soviet and French experiments reporting the production of fusion neutrons.

KMS's work in holography made them experts in laser technology and this topic naturally caught Brueckner's interest. On his return to the US, Brueckner came up with a new concept for laser-induced fusion that involved compression and implosion, as opposed to direct heating. Brueckner based his concept on the Teller-Ulam design of a hydrogen bomb, which he was aware of due to some contract work he performed at Los Alamos just after the Ivy Mike test in 1953.

In this concept, the fusion fuel is both heated and compressed by an external force. The compression greatly reduces the reaction time of the fusion events and allows the entire fuel burn to take place in microseconds. In a bomb, the compression is provided by the X-rays released by a small nuclear bomb known as the "primary". Brueckner's idea was to replace the x-rays with light from a laser; this would be far less powerful but seemed sufficient for a small amount of lightweight fuel.

=== Department of Defense contract ===
In the fall of 1968, shortly after returning to the US, Brueckner wrote a report for the AEC on the laser systems and the focus fusion concepts also presented at the meeting. He proposed a small research program to further study these concepts, but the AEC proved uninterested. He then approached the Department of Defense's (DOD) Division of Nuclear Applications, and they proved willing to fund an initial study. As this was classified information, he was not allowed to tell Siegel about his idea.

Working with mathematical physics expert John Faulkner, and later Raymond Grandey, they produced a one-dimensional computer simulation that considered the energy input from the laser, the conduction of this energy by electrons in the resulting plasma, and the formation of shock waves due to the rapid heating. To their surprise, the number of reactions was much higher than they initially expected, and this meant the required laser was some 10,000 times less powerful than the British and French teams had calculated; about 1 kilojoule of laser energy would be needed to create ignition. At the time, lasers were just reaching about 100 J energy levels, up from about 10 J only a few years earlier. This suggested lasers of the required energy would be available in the next few years. (Note: The 2008 interview with Brueckner also mentions Ralph Janda and a visit the two took to the weapons labs. It is not clear whether this was before or after the AEC became involved, as noted below.)

Brueckner returned the result to the DOD and explained that it appeared to be extremely important with near-term commercial applications.

=== Classification ===
Given the OK by the DOD, Brueckner revealed the work to Siegel in 1969. However, he also felt that the AEC would likely classify it. Siegel went to Washington to confer with the director of research at the AEC, Paul McDaniel, on the condition that the AEC treat it as a commercial secret. McDaniel stated they should first apply for patents on the concept before continuing. Brueckner returned to California and wrote several patents that were filed in the summer of 1969.

Brueckner later learned that the AEC had sent the patent applications to Livermore (LLNL) and Los Alamos, which sparked off "a major storm of criticism and worry." As if this were not enough, there was also considerable negative feeling towards the government's fusion program from within the ranks of the AEC; the fission reactor divisions were upset that the fusion people would invariably frame the advantages of fusion over fission in terms of reactor safety. James Tuck wrote to AEC director Glenn Seaborg after one such event stating they were "...jittery about any mention of the relative advantages of fusion over fission and especially about any mention of reactor hazards." Chet Holifield, one of the members of Congress' Joint Committee on Atomic Energy put his feelings to the fusion side bluntly, "I don't want this fusion thing, this pie-in-the-sky deal to distract AEC or Congress from going ahead and doing [the breeder program]." This all led to considerable ill-will by almost everyone in the AEC orbit against this sudden announcement of a near-term fusion system that might render all of the government's efforts moot in a few years.

Unknown to KMS, as early as 1960 LLNL researcher John Nuckolls had been developing an almost identical concept. Livermore's primary purpose was designing nuclear bombs and Nuckolls' concept had developed as he considered what would happen as the desired nuclear weapon yield was reduced. At the point where the yield was similar to a hand grenade, the amount of energy needed to start the fusion reaction was small enough that it could be produced by a laser. Nuckolls' version differed from Brueckner's only in design details, the underlying physics was identical.

Due to Nuckolls' work, the AEC considered laser fusion to be directly related to classified weapons development. Of particular concern was that Brueckner had access to information through work he had done for the DOD. Holifield was incensed that KMS was applying for patents on concepts that might have been developed using this data. He wrote to the company stating:

I and the other members of the Joint Committee have supported and obtained the authorization of hundreds of millions of dollars for controlled fusion research over the years. It is, at the very least, distressing to contemplate the entire CTR discipline being put in a position of economic disadvantage relative to an individual or group whose main source of information has been from research funded by the United States Government.

Later that summer, Brueckner was part of a secret meeting in West Palm Beach organized by the DOD on the use of high-power lasers in anti-aircraft and anti-missile roles. While there, the head of security of the AEC arrived and told Brueckner everything was to be considered classified and they had to stop work on it immediately. Although annoyed, Siegel also saw this as proof that the ideas had merit.

In the short term, his lawyers were able to get the AEC to agree to allow Brueckner, alone, to continue working on the concept. Over the fall and into the next spring, Brueckner filed twenty more patent applications on the concepts. Siegel's lawyers continued working on the problem and in February 1970 the matter eventually reached Seaborg's desk. Seaborg agreed to allow the company to begin work on the concept on the condition that it would be treated as classified and be subject to the same level of security seen at the national labs.

=== KMS Fusion forms ===
In spite of Siegel's prodigious sales efforts, including claims of using holography for everything from 3D television to road signs, the holography field produced few major markets and almost no repeat customers. By 1969 the market had dried up and the company was running primarily on the income from various other companies he had purchased with the Conductron sale.

Brueckner continued working on his concept through 1970 and into the spring of 1971. By that time, Siegel had decided to bet the company on fusion. Using the proceeds from selling several of KMS Industry's divisions, he set up a new company, KMS Fusion, in Ann Arbor, Michigan. Siegel convinced Brueckner to join them through a substantial profit-sharing arrangement, and Brueckner moved to the lab in the fall of 1971.

As was typical for Siegel, he announced the company's formation with great fanfare, claiming that they would bring fusion power to market "in the next few years." KMS wanted to achieve scientific breakeven by 1976, engineering breakeven by 1977, an operating high-repetition rate laser system by 1978, and an operating pilot plant by 1981.

At the time, just after the "tokamak rush" of 1970, the magnetic fusion field was exiting "the doldrums" and was also gaining considerable public attention. The KMS announcement in the midst of this caught the attention of the public, which led to a "violent reaction" in the ICF field.

=== Pellet design ===
The main difference between Brueckner's and Nuckolls' concepts was the way the fuel would be collapsed. Nuckolls, coming from the bomb world, designed what was essentially a tiny H-bomb. The fuel would be held in a capsule that was suspended within a metal cylinder known as a "hohlraum". The lasers shone on the hohlraum, heating it until it gave off X-rays, which then caused the collapse of the fuel. This mirrored the construction of a bomb, where the fusion fuel was formed into a cylinder held within a larger metal cylinder - the bomb casing - which held the X-rays released by the primary.

In contrast, Brueckner's concept shone the lasers directly on the outside of a somewhat larger capsule which collapsed it directly. Today, this is known as the "direct drive" approach, compared to the hohlraum-based concept now known as "indirect drive". Direct drive has the advantage that it makes more efficient use of the laser energy, as the creation of the X-rays in the hohlraum uses the laser energy to heat the metal X-ray hot, a process that absorbs most of the original laser energy. The disadvantage to direct drive is that the hohlraum smooths out the energy and makes the collapse process more uniform; to reach the same level of smoothness, direct drive must use much more uniform fuel capsules.

Key to Brueckner's approach was a spherical fuel pellet that was extremely symmetrical. The idea was to use hollow glass microspheres, sometimes known as microballoons, that were available from companies like 3M for use in reflective paints and other everyday applications. Working with physicist David Solomon, they attempted to find a solution to cut open the spheres, fill them, and then seal them again. In June 1972, Solomon came up with an entirely different solution, simply placing the spheres in a pressurised container of hydrogen which then diffused into the spheres right through the glass.

The next problem to solve was that the balloons varied widely in quality, and the vast majority were unsuitable for use. This led to the concept of placing large numbers of the balloons under stress, which led to most of them collapsing. Billions of them would be stressed and a few thousand survived. The survivors were then placed in a pressure chamber of deuterium and heated to around 300 F and left for several weeks. When it was opened, many of the remaining balloons would pop open, making a sound like popcorn. The remains were then put into a dish of water, which made any with holes sink to the bottom. The few that remained were useful fusion targets.

In November 1972, Solomon reported the success to Siegel, who thought that the company's future would be in fuel fabrication, not power plants. That would only be true if the design actually worked, so he approved the purchase of a suitable 1 kJ laser from CILAS, at that time a division of the French General Electric, CGE. Based on Brueckner's calculations, this would be powerful enough to hit breakeven.

=== Fusion success ===
A key requirement for any ICF device is that the collapse has to be symmetric. Indirect drive systems can use multiple lasers as the hohlraum smooths the output of the beams to provide even illumination with the X-rays, but the direct drive system is driven directly by the laser light so some system needs to be used to spread the beam out so it reaches the surface from all directions,

In KMS' design, this was accomplished in a unique fashion using a single source laser. Just prior to reaching the reaction area, the beam was split in half and sent to large lenses on either side of the reaction chamber. The lenses focused the beams down into a pinpoint size, where they passed through a tiny hole in the back of a mirror. The beam then spread back out on the far side of the hole, eventually illuminating the inner surface of a second mirror on the opposite side of the reaction area. The two mirrors formed an almost completely enclosed oblate sphere that was shaped so that any beam path that passed through the pinhole eventually passed through the center of the two mirrors, where the fuel pellet was placed. The beams might reflect several times before reaching the center, so some paths are longer than others. The shaping ensured that the beams all reached the center at the same time. The optics system was known as the "double bounce illumination system".

After considerable work setting up and aligning the laser and mirror system, on 1 May 1974 they first saw neutrons from their test shots. It was repeated successfully three more times on May 3, 1974, and May 9, 1974. While the first two tests involved solely deuterium pellets, the second two tests involved deuterium-tritium (DT) pellets. On 13 May during the annual shareholder's meeting, Siegel announced the breakthrough, stating they had "produced for the first time anywhere, to the best of [the company's] knowledge, true thermonuclear neutrons by laser-driven implosion of a deuterium pellet."

Nevertheless, it was clear that further progress would require much more capital. Siegel noted, "the major obstacle is me and my ability to raise money. I don't think its science anymore. It's financial breakeven". During this period the US suffered the effects of the 1973 oil embargo and the company's concept changed; instead of using the energy from the reactions to drive steam turbines for electricity, it would be used to produce hydrocarbons, such as methane, for fuel.

=== Brueckner leaves ===
Unfortunately, while the tests were successful in producing fusion, the results were far below those predicted by Brueckner's program. The neutron yield was around 10^{4} to 3 × 10^{5} neutrons, orders of magnitude below their calculations.

Unknown to KMS, the AEC had asked LLNL to test Brueckner's calculations using their own secret program, LASNEX, which included details honed during Livermore's long history of bomb-making. Their results suggested the performance would be about 1,000 times less than Brueckner's predictions. Their predictions were almost exactly the result that was being seen in the tests.

Further calculations at KMS suggested that the amount of power needed to ignite the capsules were much higher than what their existing laser could produce. Brueckner also became aware of similar tests with an early system at Livermore, and their intentions to build much larger lasers to continue the effort. Brueckner noted:

The conclusion, unfortunately, was clear. A much larger laser system than we and the AEC had expected would be needed, requiring time and money which KMS Industries could not provide... As these problems became apparent, I decided to leave the fusion program in Ann Arbor and in the fall of 1974 returned to UCSD.

Although Brueckner was no longer at KMS, he did continue working in the field on a consulting basis. In September 1976 he chaired a panel on the ICF approach for the Electric Power Research Institute that reviewed the progress to date. It turned in a negative assessment of the field. Calculations demonstrated that a fusion energy gain factor on the order of 125 would be needed for an ICF power plant to produce any net electricity, which was close to the maximum possible gains estimated to be between 100 and 200. Even those figures were considered unlikely, and actual demonstrated performance was somewhere between 100 and 1,000 times below those figures. The panel considered classified target designs as a possible way to reach the required gain, but found the concept of a power plant where one half was classified was highly unlikely to work in a commercial setting.

=== Siegel passes ===
Although KMS Industries did not have the income needed to continue the research, neither did the big labs, which were dependent on funding from the AEC. Siegel then applied for similar funding to keep the company's research going. By early 1975 he was spending three days a week in Washington, up to sixteen hours a day. His health took a considerable toll; already seriously overweight, he developed hypertension.

The effort ultimately came down to a final appeal to the United States Congressional Joint Committee on Atomic Energy on 14 March 1975. The presenters in the queue in front of Siegel dragged on, and it was not until late in the day that their turn finally came up. He started reading his presentation and then stopped. Half-rising from his chair, he managed to say one more word, "stroke", and then collapsed. He died in the hospital a few hours later.

Siegel had previously taken out a large key person insurance policy for KMS Fusion, and this was enough to keep the company running for a few months. On 19 May, the company received a letter of intent that KMS would receive a five-year contract at about $8 to $10 million a year. This was not enough for a new laser of the size required, but the company's expertise in fuel pellet fabrication was of considerable interest to the AEC.

=== The experimental setup ===
In order for KMS Fusion to achieve ICF, the following equipment was necessary: a mode-locked YAG oscillator, a CILAS vk640 laser, an 80-mm rod amplifier, seven 10-cm clear-aperture GE disk amplifier units, two aspheric mirrors, and two ellipsoidal lenses. A single 30 ps pulse started at the oscillator by a laser-driven spark gap was divided into a specific number of temporarily delayed pulses which were attenuated and recombined into a tailored pulse shape. The initial pulse was kept short in order to protect the laser from damage. The tailored pulse was amplified by the laser and the 80-mm amplifier and then, after travelling 30 m, it entered the GE disk amplifiers where it was split into two sub-beams. These sub-beams, using the lenses and the mirrors, were directed onto the fuel pellet to provide energy.

In order for the laser energy applied to the fuel pellet to be nearly uniform and orthogonal to the surface of the pellet, the pellet needed to be aligned perfectly. The pellet needed to be placed in the focus point of both of the mirrors. This is achieved by “using a continuous wave YAG laser which is collinear with and is divergence-matched to main laser.” Once the KMS Fusion team had the correct setup, they used small longitudinal displacements to apply the laser energy uniformly. After KMS Fusion started using government contracts for funding, they primarily became a fuel pellet fabrication facility. They perfected the method to producing fuel pellets to the point where they were able to produce them for less than a hundredth of a cent.

== Government contracts ==
In May 1978, a report by Comptroller General Elmer B. Staats to the Chairman of the House Committee on Armed Services was submitted that reviewed two prior government contracts of KMS Fusion. The two contracts in under review were the first two years of public funding for KMS Fusion. The Department of Energy (DoE) had awarded KMS Fusion contracts for 1976 and 1977. After the death of Kip Siegel in 1975, KMS Fusion survived for one year on his life insurance but then needed a way to earn funding, resulting in new government contracts. By February 10, 1978, KMS Fusion had received $22 million in federal funding.

=== 1976 contract ===
The 1976 contract had some lofty goals set for KMS Fusion. Their main goal was the generation of power from laser fusion; however, KMS Fusion also developed a new laser system, new targets and new ways of target fabrication. The targets used were large-diameter thin-walled targets made of glass, plastic or layers of both. They also developed targets that were completely solid, filled with a liquid, or filled with a gas to examine which would generate the most power. The only failure of the contract was that generation of power was not achieved by laser fusion. The failure was contributed to “specifying laser power based on calculations which could not adequately predict laser performance and from using dirty laser optical equipment”. This meant that the laser power received did not match with predicted power and therefore laser fusion could not be achieved at this lower power. KMS Fusion did not have sophisticated enough software to model their laser power output so a partnership with Lawrence Livermore National Lab (LLNL) was formed. Livermore software showed that KMS Fusion would receive 25% of the originally predicted laser power from their system. Other than the failure to generate power from laser fusion, the DoE stated that KMS Fusion's work exceeded contract requirements.

=== 1977 contract ===
The 1977 contract was very similar to the 1976 contract but focused on fixing the problems that arose during the previous contract. New targets were fabricated, this time double-shelled glass spheres were produced, and the targets were suspended in the air so that they could be uniformly irradiated. Since blaming the failure of power generation from laser fusion on dirty equipment, many steps were taken to improve KMS Fusion's lab space. The laser's optics was cleaned and the whole system enclosed so that contaminants would not affect the system. After cleaning the laser power observed doubled from the previous year. Working again with LLNL, KMS used their software to model their laser power and improve laser performance. However, KMS Fusion failed to generate power from laser fusion. While making vast improvements in the area of target fabrication, fusion power still eluded them.

After review of these two contracts by the DoE, it was determined that the development of fusion power be left in the hands of the national labs. These labs had the resources, including computer systems and expensive laser systems, to have the best shot at producing laser fusion. The DoE suggested that KMS Fusion should still investigate target fabrication and laser-target interactions. The DoE saw KMS Fusion involved by “commercial mass production of laser fusion targets” and that is what they did for the national labs that could not make their own targets. KMS Fusion was involved in this role until they went under in 1993 after competition for a new DoE contract was opened.

== Shutdown ==
KMS lost government funding in 1990 and closed as a fusion research and support organization.

In the later years of KMS Fusion's life they were known for being a tritium handling facility due to their focus on the development of laser fusion targets. When the company went under, it was not properly closed down in terms of radiation regulations. In 1995, the DoE selected LLNL to team up with the DoE's Oakland Operations Office to decontaminate, decommission, and close out the facility. Livermore was selected because of its existing expertise in handling bulk tritium and low-level radioactive waste. The KMS Fusion facility was abandoned for almost two years before cleanup began. During this time, Michigan's cold winters had caused some of the pipes to freeze and burst. This resulted in flooding in areas where chemicals were kept, spreading contamination. In addition, when firefighters were fighting a fire in a copier room, some tritium had spread inside the building. “The project was accomplished efficiently and effectively as a result of DOE and LLNL working together to return the facility to the owner for unrestricted use.” Phillip E. Hill.

== See also ==
- List of nuclear fusion companies

== Citations ==
=== Bibliography ===
- Heppenheimer, Thomas (1984). The Man-made Sun: The Quest for Fusion Power. Little, Brown. ISBN 9780316357937.
- Johnston, Sean (2006). Holographic Visions: A History of New Science. OUP Oxford. ISBN 9780191513886.
- Brueckner, Keith (25 April 2008). "Keith Brueckner" (Interview). Interviewed by Alex Wellerstein. La Jolla, California: American Institute of Physics.
- Brueckner, Keith (2007). "A beginning for ICF by laser". In Velade, Guillermo; Santamarfa, Natividad (eds.). Inertial Confinement Nuclear Fusion: A historical Approach by its Pioneers. Foxwell & Davies. ISBN 9781905868100.
- Brueckner, Keith (June 1977). "An Assessment of Laser-Driven Fusion" (PDF). International Journal of Fusion Energy. 1 (2): 25–54. Bibcode:1977IJFE....1...25.
- Bromberg, Joan Lisa (1982). Fusion: Science, Politics, and the Invention of a New Energy Source. MIT Press. ISBN 978-0-262-02180-7.
