= 1974 Zhaotong earthquake =

Earthquake in China

- Location within China Location within Yunnan
- UTC time: 1974-05-10 19:25:16
- ISC event: 748061
- USGS-ANSS: ComCat
- Local date: May 11, 1974
- Local time: 03:25:16
- Magnitude: 7.1 M_{s}
- Depth: 14 km (8.7 mi)
- Epicenter: 28.24°N 104.01°E
- Areas affected: China, Yunnan, Sichuan
- Max. intensity: MMI IX (Violent)
- Casualties: 1,641–20,000 dead

The 1974 Zhaotong earthquake occurred at 3:25 in the morning local time on 11 May 1974, with a Coordinated Universal Time (UTC) time of 19:25:16 on 10 May. It had a magnitude that was measured at 7.0 on the moment magnitude scale and 7.1 on the surface-wave magnitude scale. It had a maximum perceived intensity of IX (Violent) on the Mercalli intensity scale. The epicenter was located in Zhaotong prefecture in Yunnan province and it caused between 1,641 and 20,000 deaths.

== Earthquake ==
The earthquake has been ascribed to slip on a thrust fault trending north–south with a dip of 60° to the east, from geodetic data analysis. It has also been interpreted to result from strike-slip faulting along a steeply-dipping NW-SE trending fault. The isoseismal lines for the earthquake were poorly defined, due to variations both in topography and ground conditions.

The earthquake consisted of more than ten separate sub-events. The sequence began with a few shocks in the first two to three seconds with magnitudes less than 5. These were followed by several shocks approaching magnitude 7 over a period of about a minute. The areal distribution of the individual shocks showed no progression along the fault plane as would be expected with a propagating fracture.

The earthquake triggered many landslides in the epicentral area. The bedrock geology in the area contains rocks of almost all ages from Neoproterozoic through to Quaternary. Landslides were mainly confined to areas that experienced intensities of VII or greater and had slopes of moderate dip (26°–45°). In all but one case, the landslides involved Quaternary material, the exception being a slide that was controlled by bedding planes in a Permian limestone. Rock avalanches occurred on steeper slopes, particularly affecting jointed and weathered Permian limestone and Triassic sandstone/shale sequences.

== Damage ==
An area of about 400,000 square kilometres was affected by the earthquake. 28,000 houses collapsed and a further 38,000 were damaged. Houses with wooden frames in the epicentral area remained undamaged. The number of deaths reported varies from 1,641 to 20,000 with a further 1,600 injured.

The largest landslide formed a dam up to 30 metres (98 ft) high across the Yangtze River, turning the valley above it into a lake.

== See also ==
- List of earthquakes in 1974
- List of earthquakes in Yunnan
- List of earthquakes in Sichuan
- List of earthquakes in China
