= Jim Prendergast (revolutionary) =

Irish communist (1914–1974)

- Born: 14 January 1914
- Died: 31 May 1974 (aged 60); St Johns Wood Terrace
- Other name: James Prendergast
- Education: Lenin International School, Moscow
- Organization: National Union of Railwaymen
- Known for: Co-founding the Connolly Association. Fighting for the International Brigades. Ending racial segregation in employment on London train stations.
- Political party: Irish Workers' Group. Communist Party of Great Britain
- Relatives: Bill Gannon
- Military career
- Allegiance: Spanish Republic (1936-1939) (United Kingdom) Great Britain (1939-1945).
- Branch: International Brigade. Royal Air Force
- Conflicts: Spanish Civil War. Second World War.

Jim Prendergast (1914 – 1974) was a leading communist, civil rights activist, trade union leader, and member of the Communist Party of Great Britain (CPGB). He joined the Irish section of the International Brigades during the Spanish Civil War (1936-1939), founded the Connolly Association to support Irish immigrants in Britain, and served as the editor of Irish Freedom. In 1966 as a leading member of the National Union of Railwaymen (NUR), Prendergast led a successful campaign to end racial segregation (the colour bar) in employment of London Underground rail stations, allowing black people to become station employees.

== Early adult life ==
Jim Prendergast was born on 14 January 1914, in the Irish city of Dublin. He began working at the age of 14 as a machine operator in a mineral water factory.

In 1932 Prendergast joined the Irish Workers' Group, a precursor organisation to the Communist Party of Ireland, and in 1934 began studying at the Lenin International School in Moscow, before moving to London and joining the Communist Party of Great Britain (CPGB).

== Spanish Civil War ==
Jim Prendergast was an early volunteer for the International Brigades during the Spanish Civil War (1936-1939), arriving in Spain on 12 December 1936 and almost immediately seeing combat in Cordoba near Lopera. Prendergast was attached to the XIV International Brigade which had no training, telecommunications, or air and artillery support, and as a consequence suffered high casualties at the hands of fascist forces. The military disaster for the International Brigades was later described by Jim Prendergast

"My rifle is soon burning hot. ‘Kit’ comes over. I notice his face with lanes of sweat running through the dust. He hands me a note. It is from Brigade H.Q. telling us that we must hold out at all costs. . . . Somebody calls my name. It is Pat Smith. Blood streams from his head and arm. Tom Jones of Wexford is there. Good man, Tom. Always dresses a man where he falls. A hero. He tells me Goff and Daly are hit. I reach the hill-crest where ‘Kit’ is directing fire. He is using a rifle himself and pausing every while to give instructions. Suddenly, he shouts, his rifle spins out of his hand, and he falls back. . . . His voice is broken with agony. ‘Do your best boys, hold on!’ Tears glisten in our eyes. . . . ‘Kit’ is taken away. . . . I see Fascist tanks rolling up the road to the right. The Moors are sweeping us front and flanks. We'll never hold out now. I move to a firing-position. Suddenly, I am lifted of [sic] my feet. Something terrific has hit me in the side. I cannot breathe. . . . In the ambulance I meet ‘Kit’. He is in terrible agony, and can talk little. ‘How are the rest?’ is his constant question . . . Next morning they told me our great leader was dead."

Soon afterwards Prendergast was elected a Political Delegate for the Irish section of the International Brigades and made an officer after being persuaded by Will Paynter to attend an officer training course a position he held until he was wounded near Jarama on 12 February 1937.

Jim Prendergast wrote extensively in the Daily Worker on the capture Major Frank Ryan, the leader of the Irish anti-fascists in Spain, who was detained for far longer than other international volunteers as a part of Nazi attempts to make contacts with the Irish Republican Army.

== Creation of the Connolly Association ==
In 1938 Jim Prendergast became one of the founding members of the Connolly Association (originally founded as the Connolly Club), a charity and republican activist organisation that sought to support the Irish immigrant communities living in Britain and to forward Irish republican and socialist ideas. In January 1939 the Connolly Association published a newspaper titled Irish Freedom (renamed Irish Democrat in 1945), with Jim Prendergast as its editor.

While selling copies of Irish Freedom near Marble Arch, Prendergast was arrested by the British police who falsely accused him of obstructing the highway. The case was dismissed after the magistrate suspected that Prendergast was arrested for selling a political newspaper and not for obstructing traffic, and noted that the case should never have been brought to court. While he was detained, agents of the British government had broken into Prendergast's house and searched his belongings.

== Second World War ==
During WWII, Jim Prendergast joined a group of volunteers consisting entirely of former International Brigade members, engaged in research to develop diving equipment for the British military. This group was headed by the communist scientist J. B. S. Haldane, who was also a member of the Communist Party of Great Britain (CPGB).

Later in the war, Prendergast became a rear gunner for the Royal Air Force (RAF).

== Trade Union and anti-segregation work ==
After WWII, Jim Prendergast became a leading member of London's Irish communities, and began working as a guard for Marylebone railway station. He joined the National Union of Railwaymen (NUR) and quickly became one of its leading members, first being elected as a branch secretary and then elected to the NUR executive committee.

In 1966 Jim Prendergast led a campaign that ended the colour bar (racial segregation) on London railways, ending a 12-year policy that barred black people from being employed in certain higher-paying jobs. One experienced guard known as Asquith Xavier, who was also a trade union member, received a letter telling him that his application for a job at Euston railway station had been rejected due to a ban on "coloured men" being employed as guards and porters. Guards at Euston station were receiving £10-£15 more each week on average than the staff at other London railway stations. Helping both Prendergast and Xavier in their attempt to end the colour bar was the Morning Star, a British communist party newspaper that helped to publicise the plight of black workers and fought to end segregation in Britain. After Jim Prendergast intervened on behalf of the NUR, British Railways not only gave Mr Xavier a job but also ended their policy of barring black people from certain jobs.

== Death ==
Jim Prendergast died on 31 May 1974, from injuries he sustained from falling down the stairs in front of his home in St Johns Wood Terrace. His remains were cremated in Golders Green Crematorium and were taken to Mount Jerome where they were placed in the grave of Jim's comrade Bill Gannon, who had also been an influential Irish communist. After being buried with Bill, an individual gravestone was raised to commemorate Jim Prendergast.
