= 1974 Izu Peninsula earthquake =

Earthquake impacting Izu Peninsula, Japan

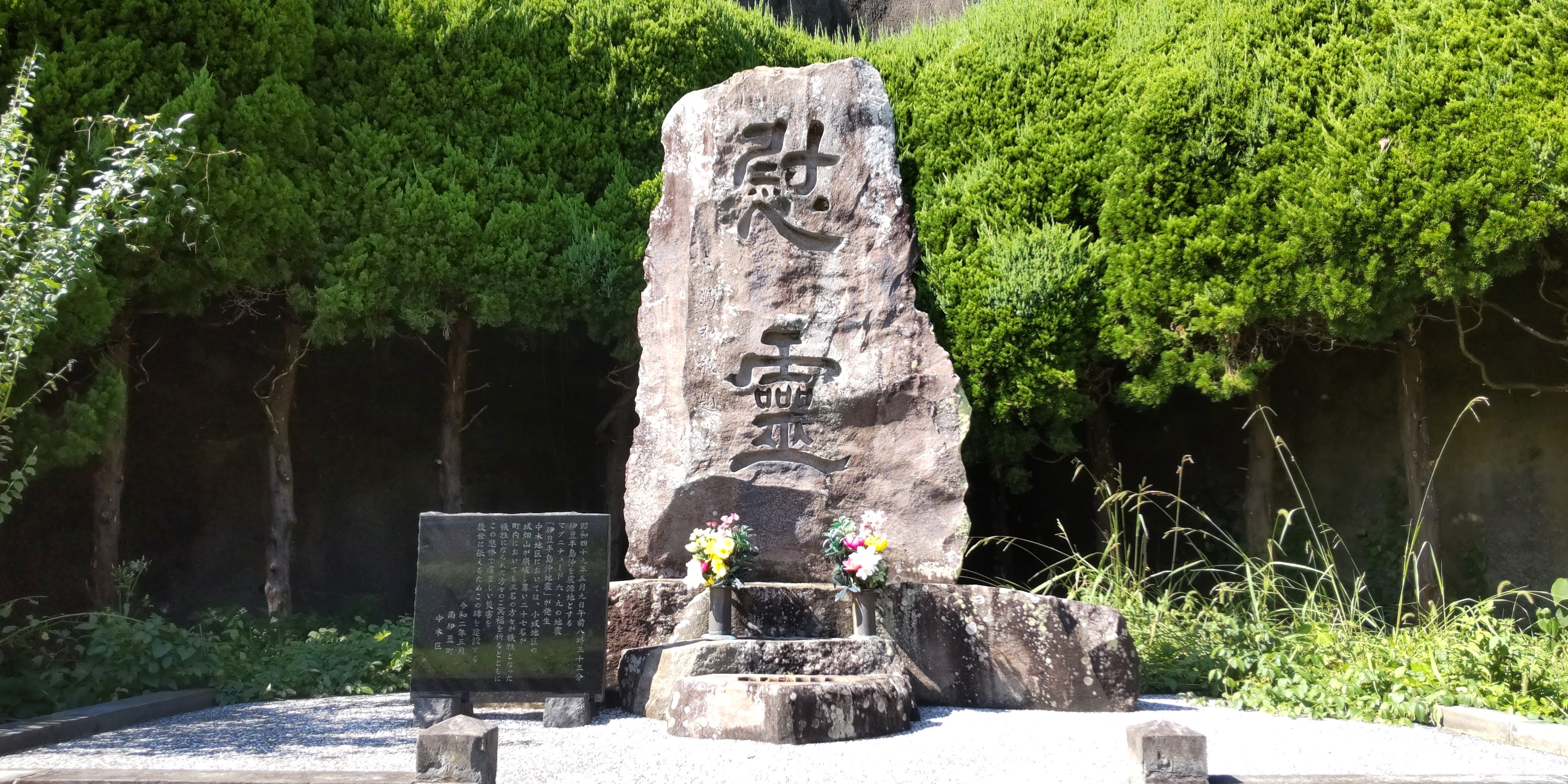
- The memorial cenotaph of earthquake

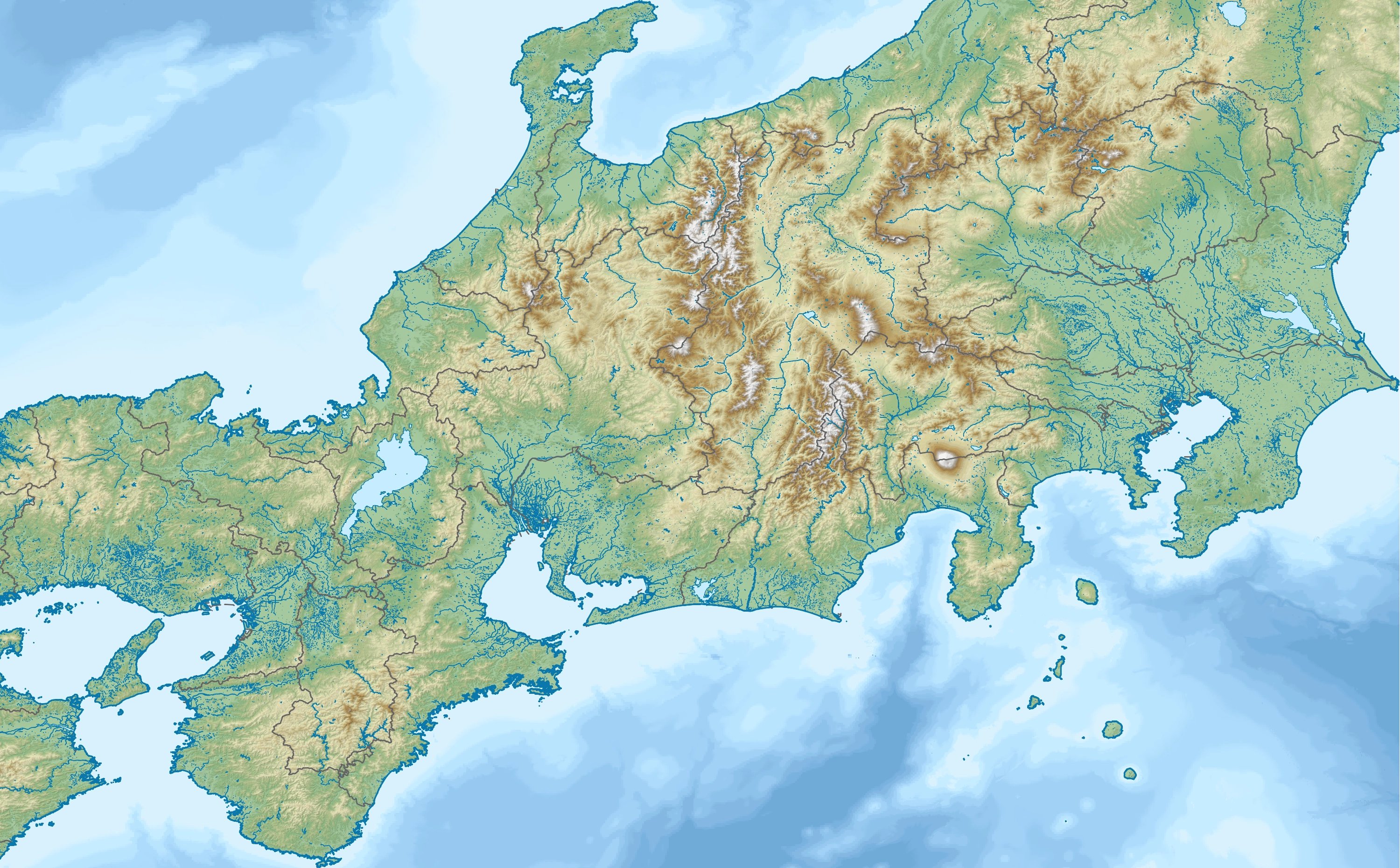
- Location within Shizuoka Prefecture Location within Central Japan
- UTC time: 1974-05-08 23:33:29
- ISC event: 748001
- USGS-ANSS: ComCat
- Local date: May 9, 1974
- Local time: 08:33:29
- Magnitude: 6.5 M_{s} 6.9 M_{JMA}
- Depth: 9 km (5.6 mi)
- Epicenter: 34.6°N 138.8°E
- Areas affected: Japan
- Max. intensity: MMI VIII (Severe) JMA 5−
- Tsunami: Yes
- Casualties: 38 dead or missing

The 1974 Izu Peninsula earthquake (Japanese: 1974年伊豆半島沖地震) occurred on May 9 at 08:33 local time. The epicenter was located off the Izu Peninsula, Japan. Twenty-five people were reported dead. Landslides and damage to roads, buildings, and infrastructure were reported. This earthquake triggered a small tsunami. The intensity in Tokyo reached shindo 3. The magnitude of this earthquake was put at M_{s} 6.5, or M_{JMA} 6.9.

== See also ==
- List of earthquakes in 1974
- List of earthquakes in Japan
