= American Woman (2019 film) =

- Official poster
- Directed by: Semi Chellas
- Written by: Semi Chellas
- Based on: American Woman by Susan Choi
- Produced by: Semi Chellas; Christina Piovesan; Noah Segal
- Starring: Hong Chau; Sarah Gadon; John Gallagher Jr.; Lola Kirke; David Cubitt; Jordan Pettle; Richard Walters; Ellen Burstyn
- Cinematography: Gregory Middleton
- Edited by: Lindsay Allikas
- Music by: Lesley Barber
- Production companies: Killer Films; First Generation Films; Telefilm Canada; Level Forward; Ontario Creates; CBC Films
- Distributed by: Elevation Pictures
- Release dates: April 28, 2019 (Tribeca); June 30, 2020 (Canada)
- Running time: 85 minutes
- Countries: United States; Canada
- Language: English

American Woman is a 2019 drama film written and directed by Semi Chellas, in her feature directorial debut. It stars Hong Chau, Sarah Gadon, John Gallagher Jr., Lola Kirke, David Cubitt, Jordan Pettle, Richard Walters and Ellen Burstyn. Based on the 2003 novel of the same title by Susan Choi, the film is a fictional account of Wendy Yoshimura, the real-life woman who cared for heiress Patty Hearst after she was abducted.

It had its world premiere at the Tribeca Film Festival on April 28, 2019, was released in Canada on June 30, 2020, by Elevation Pictures.

== Plot ==
Adept at living off the grid ever since she masterminded an act of violence against the American government, 25-year-old former radical Jenny Shimada agrees to take care of three fugitives who are on the run. One of the three fugitives happens to be the kidnapped granddaughter of a wealthy newspaper magnate and has become a national celebrity for embracing her captors’ ideology and joining their revolutionary cell.

== Cast ==
- Hong Chau as Jenny
- Sarah Gadon as Pauline
- John Gallagher Jr. as Juan
- Lola Kirke as Yvonne
- Ellen Burstyn as Miss Dolly
- David Cubitt as Agent John Spivey
- Jordan Pettle as Rob Frazer
- Richard Walters as Thomas

== Production ==
In September 2017, it was announced Hong Chau had joined the cast of the film, with Semi Chellas directing from a screenplay she wrote. Killer Films was announced as producing the film.

== Release ==
The film had its world premiere at the Tribeca Film Festival on April 28, 2019. It had a gala premiere at the Toronto International Film Festival in September 2019.

== Reception ==
As of October 2021, 57% of the 14 reviews compiled by Rotten Tomatoes are positive, with an average rating of 6/10. The Globe and Mail calls it a "Canadian heist thriller American Woman knows when to simmer and when to boil over."

It competed in the Calgary International Film Festival in 2019, where it was awarded a Special Jury Mention for Acting. It also won Best Picture, Best Director (Semi Chellas), Best Actress (Hong Chau), and Best Cinematography (Gregory Middleton) at the Downtown Los Angeles Film Festival in 2019.

== Awards ==
Award	Date of ceremony	Category	Recipient(s)	Result	Ref(s)
Downtown Los Angeles Film Festival	2019	Best Picture	American Woman	Won	
Downtown Los Angeles Film Festival	2019	Best Director	Semi Chellas	Won	
Downtown Los Angeles Film Festival	2019	Best Actress	Hong Chau	Won	
Downtown Los Angeles Film Festival	2019	Best Cinematography	Gregory Middleton	Won	
Canadian Screen Awards	2020	Best Cinematography	Gregory Middleton	Nominated	
Canadian Screen Awards	2020	Best Costume Design	Marissa Schwartz, Mara Zigler	Nominated	
Canadian Screen Awards	2020	Best Makeup	Candice Ornstein	Nominated	
Canadian Screen Awards	2020	Best Hair	Peggy Kyriakidou	Nominated	
