= Satyal =

Satyal is a surname of Nepali origin. Notable people with the surname include:

- Rajiv Satyal (born 1976), American comedian
- Rakesh Satyal (born 1980), American novelist
