= Wendy Yoshimura =

American painter, former member of the Symbionese Liberation Army (born 1943)

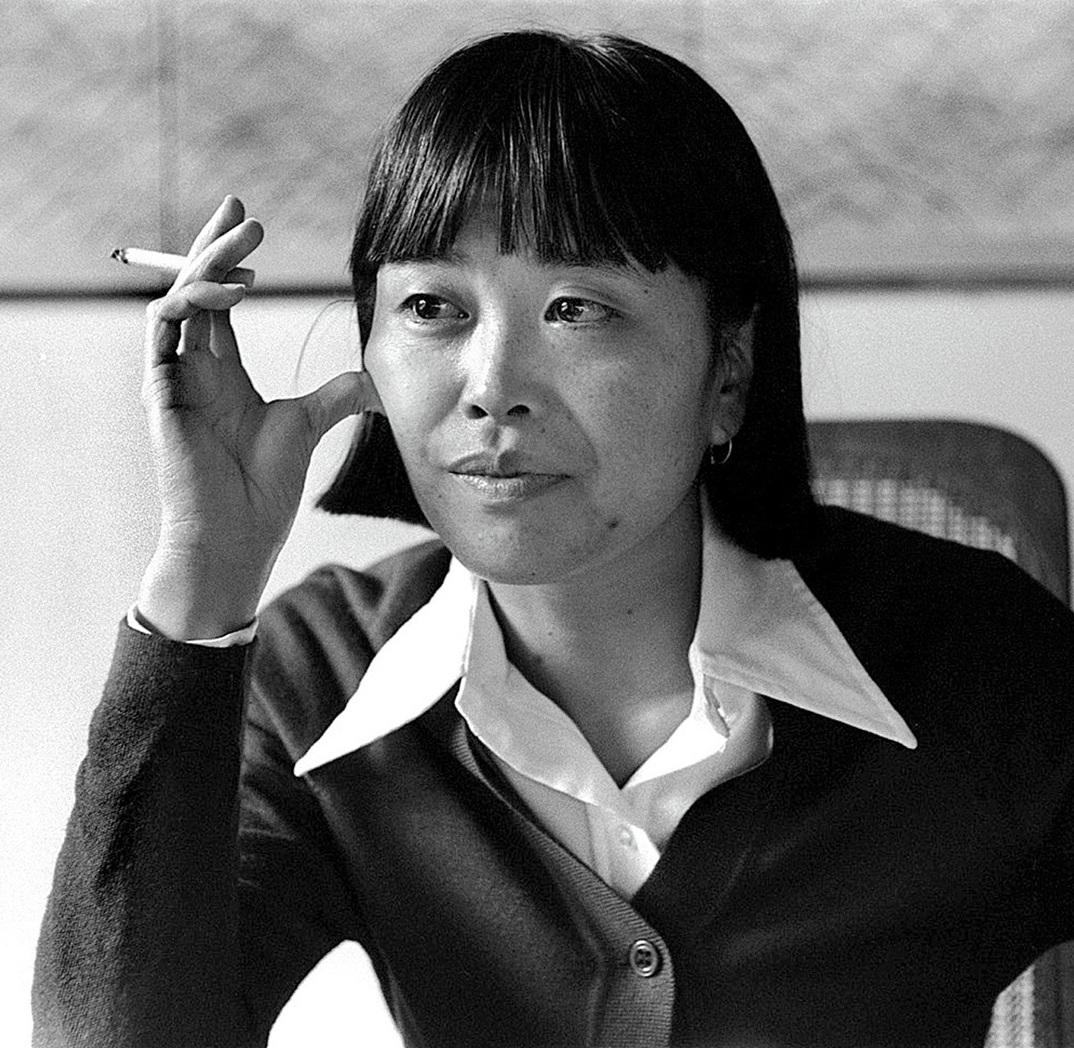
- Yoshimura in 1976
- Born: Wendy Masako Yoshimura; January 17, 1943 (age 83); Manzanar Internment Camp, Inyo County, California, U.S.
- Occupation: Painter
- Movement: Symbionese Liberation Army (SLA)

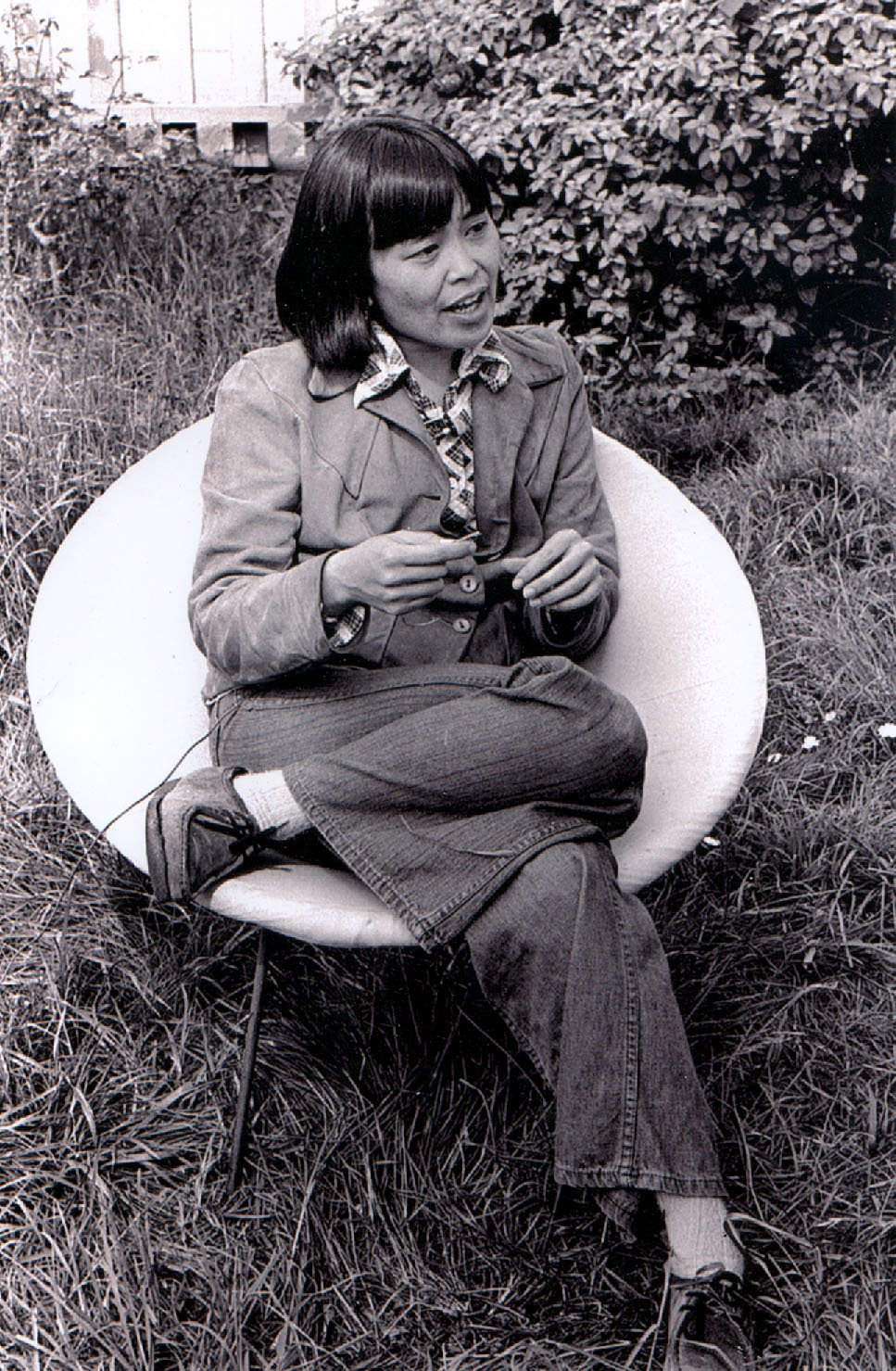
Yoshimura in 1976

Wendy Masako Yoshimura (born January 17, 1943) is an American still life watercolor painter. She was a member of the leftist terrorist group the Symbionese Liberation Army (SLA) during the mid-1970s. She was born in Manzanar, one of numerous World War II-era internment camps for Japanese Americans who were forced out of their homes and businesses along the West Coast. She was raised both in Japan and California's Central Valley.

During her last year of art college, she encountered and became involved in radical politics as a result of meeting activist Willie Brandt. He founded the Revolutionary Army, another violent leftist organization, in Berkeley, California.

== Early life ==
Yoshimura was born at the Manzanar Internment Camp for Japanese Americans where her American-born parents were incarcerated. All the family were American citizens by birth. After the war, the Yoshimura family moved to Etajima, a small island off the coast of Hiroshima. Her father worked for the Allied Occupation forces. Yoshimura spoke Japanese as her first language.

The family returned to the US when Yoshimura was 13 years old. Because she did not speak English, Yoshimura was initially placed in the second grade in the Fresno, California school system. She learned English rapidly and later graduated in 1969 from the California College of Arts and Crafts (now California College of the Arts).

=== Revolutionary Army ===
Yoshimura became associated with the Revolutionary Army, a group founded by her boyfriend, Willie Brandt. He used the title in public statements claiming responsibility for violent actions intended to express opposition to the Vietnam War. In 1972, police discovered a weapons and explosives cache in a Berkeley garage which Yoshimura had rented and described it as a "massive bomb factory." They also found letters taking credit for planned future bombings targeting the University of California, Berkeley campus, including the Naval Architecture building. Notes described a specific plan to kidnap or assassinate World Bank President and former defense secretary Robert McNamara at his winter residence in Aspen, Colorado. Brandt and two others were arrested in Berkeley on March 31, 1972, and subsequently convicted.

Yoshimura evaded a police dragnet and fled California. She lived under an alias in New Jersey until 1974. In 1977, she was captured and convicted of unlawful possession of explosives, of a machine gun, and of substances and materials with the intent to make destructive devices and explosives. She was sentenced to a one-to-fifteen years in prison. She was released on parole in September 1980.

=== Symbionese Liberation Army ===
Also in 1974, married couple Bill and Emily Harris, with kidnapping victim-turned fugitive Patty Hearst, relocated to rural Pennsylvania. The Harrises were surviving founding members of the Berkeley terrorist group known as the Symbionese Liberation Army. Six of their members had died in a May 1974 shootout with Los Angeles police at a house in Los Angeles. Sports writer and political activist Jack Scott had helped the high-profile fugitives make their way east. He arranged for Yoshimura to join them and handle shopping and other public transactions.

After two months with the group, Yoshimura left and returned alone to California, taking up residence in San Francisco. Hearst and the Harrises found their own way back into the state and regrouped in Sacramento. When the FBI found Yoshimura's thumbprint in the SLA's rural hideout, newspaper headlines tied her to the group. She fled San Francisco and reunited with the SLA members in Sacramento.

While in Sacramento with associates from the San Francisco Bay Area, some of the fugitives planned and carried out an armed robbery of Crocker National Bank in Carmichael, California. Bank customer Myrna Opsahl was shot and killed. Hearst's account in Every Secret Thing states that she and Yoshimura opposed the action and were assigned to "switch cars" far from the scene. After the robbery, the group abandoned Sacramento and fled individually to San Francisco.

=== Arrest and conviction ===
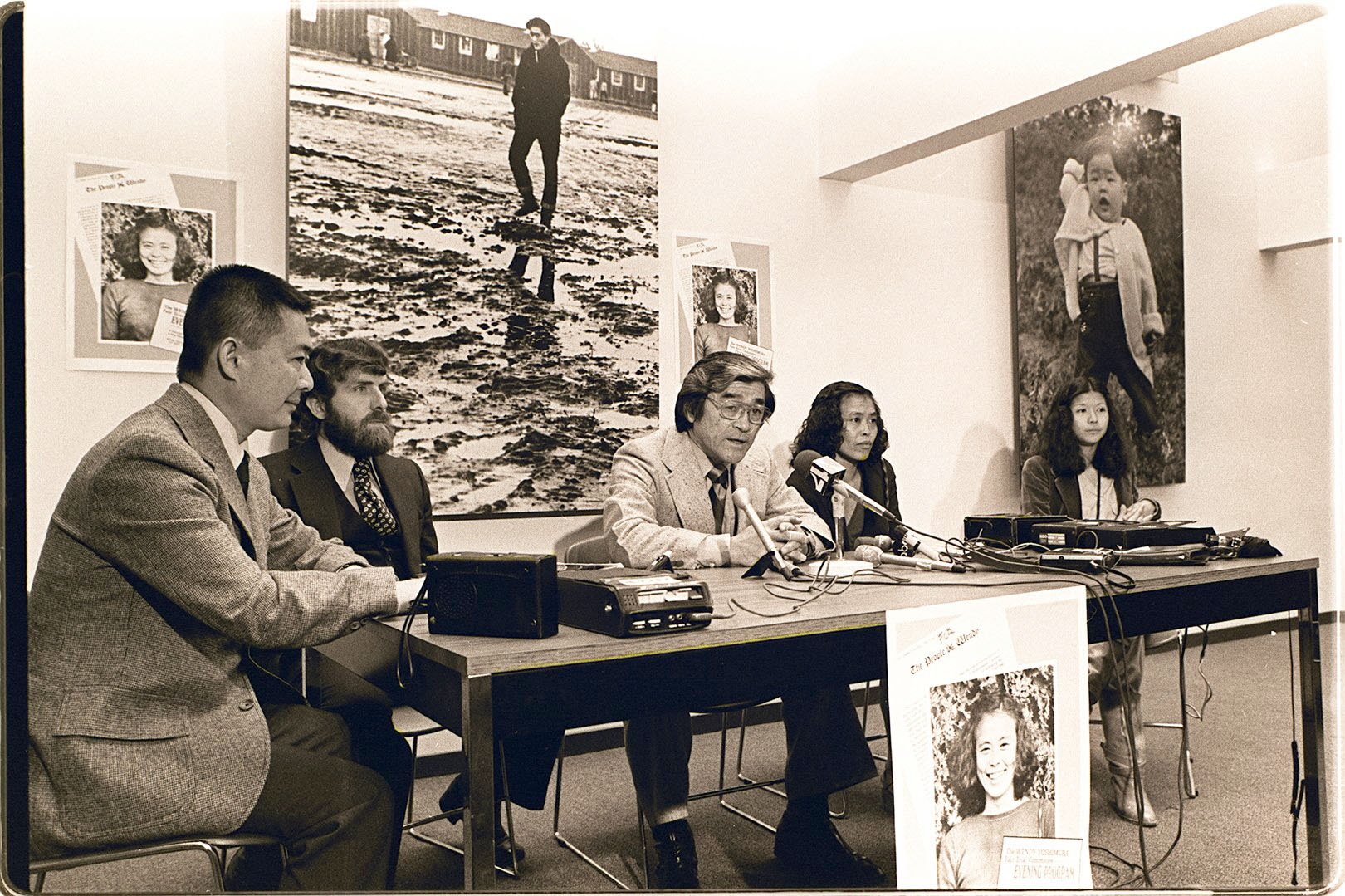
Wendy Yoshimura Fair Trial Committee press conference at Japanese American Citizens League, San Francisco, in 1976, left to right, Raymond Y. Okamura, James Larson, Lloyd Keigo Wake, Wendy Yoshimura, and Gail Aratani.

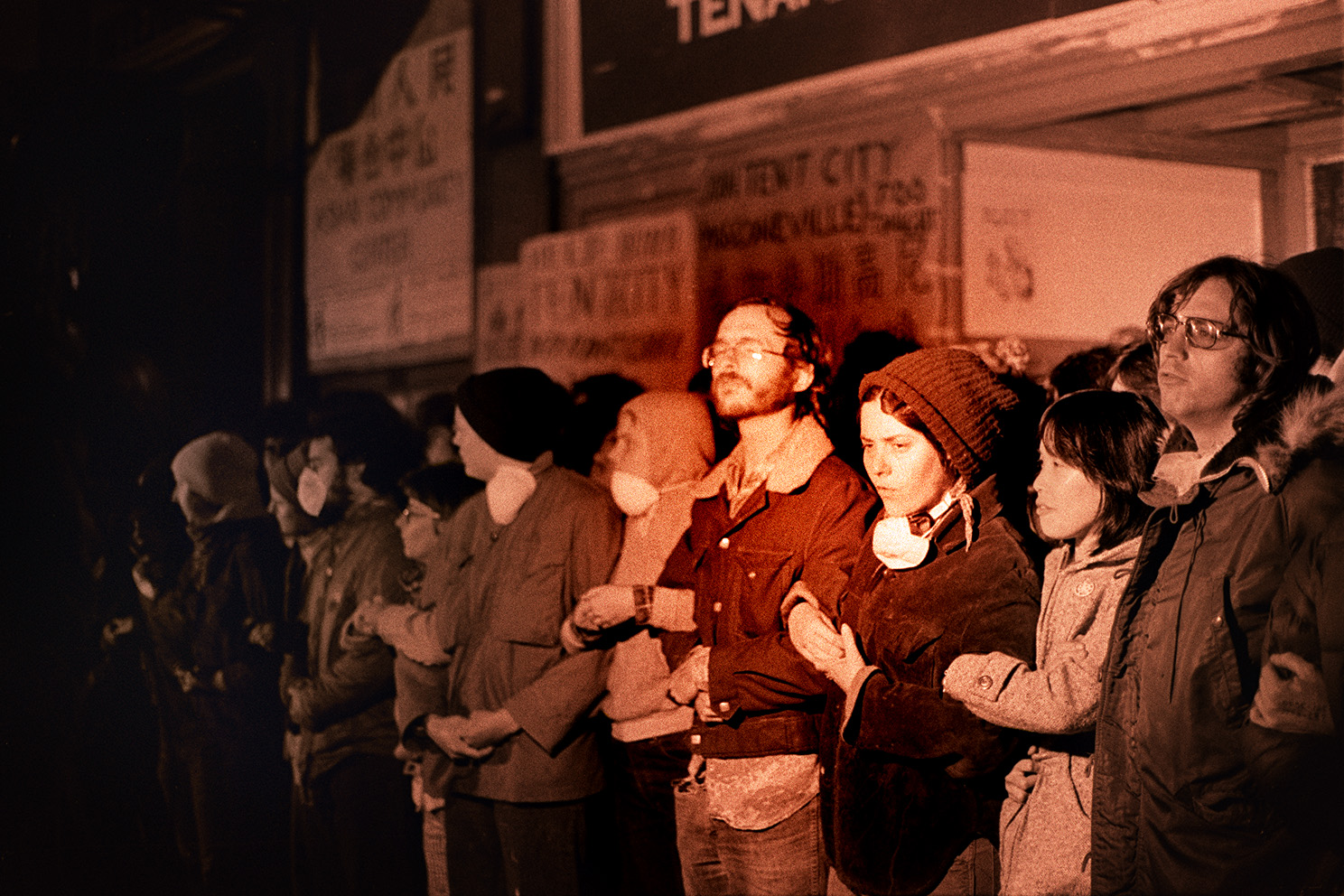
Wendy Yoshimura, second from right, in front of the International Hotel, with protesters on eviction night, August 4, 1977

On September 18, 1975, Yoshimura was arrested with Hearst in a second-floor apartment at 625 Morse Street by FBI Special Agent Tom Padden and San Francisco Police Department Inspector Tim Casey. Padden and Casey failed to read Hearst and Yoshimura their Miranda rights and did not obtain a search warrant until twenty-six hours later. Weapons evidence, including a handgun in Yoshimura's purse and a shotgun in the bedroom, was suppressed because of this oversight.

During Yoshimura's trial, Japanese Americans who empathized with her family's experience during World War II gave $150,000 to aid her legal defense conducted by the Asian Law Caucus, and led by Garrick Lew. They did this through the Wendy Yoshimura Fair Trial Committee.

Ultimately, Yoshimura was convicted on explosives and weapons charges and sent to state prison for six months; she was paroled in 1980.

=== Grand jury investigation ===
In 1991 Yoshimura was granted limited immunity to testify during a grand jury investigation into the 1975 armed bank robbery by the SLA in Carmichael, California in which Myrna Opsahl, 42-year-old mother of four, was killed. One SLA member, Michael Bortin, had pleaded guilty to the robbery. No indictments resulted at the time.

In 2002 five former SLA members and associates were arrested, and four of them pleaded guilty to charges related to the homicide.

== Present day ==
As of 2005, Yoshimura is an artist and resides in north Oakland, California. She teaches water color painting at her studio and at a San Francisco community center. Her still-life watercolors are often displayed in the Bay Area.

== In media ==
- American Woman (2003) by Susan Choi is a novel related to Yoshimura's life during that period of involvement with Hearst and the SLA. Characters are given other names and circumstances changed. It was a finalist for the Pulitzer Prize.
- It was adapted as a 2019 film by the same name, written and directed by Canadian filmmaker Semi Chellas. Hong Chau plays the activist Jenny.
- Wendy... Uh... What's Her Name is a 2006 documentary by Curtis Choy.
