= Asian American Literary Awards =

Awards by the Asian American Writers' Workshop

The Asian American Literary Awards are a set of annual awards that have been presented by The Asian American Writers' Workshop since 1998. The awards include a set of honors for excellence in fiction, poetry and nonfiction, chosen by a panel of literary and academic judges; a Members' Choice Award, voted on by the Workshop's members from the list of that year's entries; and a Lifetime Achievement Award. To be eligible, a book must be written by someone of Asian descent living in the United States and published first in English; entries are actively solicited by the Workshop.

== List of winners ==
* = Member's Choice Award

1998

- Mei-mei Berssenbrugge – Endocrinology
- Lois-Ann Yamanaka – Blu's Hanging

1999

- Susan Choi – The Foreign Student
- Arthur Sze – The Redshifting Web: Poems 1970–98

2000

- Eric Gamalinda – Zero Gravity
- Chang-rae Lee – A Gesture Life
- Bino Realuyo* – Umbrella Country

2001

- Ha Jin – The Bridegroom and Other Stories
- Eugene Gloria – Drivers at the Short Time Motel: Poems
- Akhil Sharma – An Obedient Father
- Nick Carbo* – Secret Asian Man

2002

- Alexander Chee – Edinburgh
- Luis H. Francia – Eye of the Fish: A Personal Archipelago
- Christina Chiu – Troublemaker and Other Saints
- Don Lee* – Yellow

2003

- Walter Lew – Treadwinds: Poems and Intermedia Texts
- Meera Nair – Video: Stories
- Julie Otsuka – When the Emperor was Divine
- Ed Lin* – Waylaid

2004

- Mei-mei Berssenbrugge – Nest
- Monique Truong – The Book of Salt
- Vijay Vaitheeswaran – Power to the People
- Patrick Rosal* – Uprock, Headspin, Scramble and Dive

2005

- Brian Leung World Famous Love Acts
- Suketu Mehta – Maximum City: Bombay Lost and Found
- Srikanth Reddy – Facts for Visitors
- Ishle Yi Park* – The Temperature of this Water

2006

- Jeff Chang – Can't Stop Won't Stop: A History of the Hip Hop Generation
- Rattawut Lapcharoensap – Sightseeing
- Shanxing Wang – Mad Science in Imperial City
- Ed Bok Lee* – Real Karaoke People

2007

- Linh Dinh – Borderless Bodies
- Amitav Ghosh – Incendiary Circumstances: A Chronicle of the Turmoil of Our Times
- Samrat Upadhyay – The Royal Ghosts
- Gene Luen Yang* – American Born Chinese

2008

- Mohsin Hamid – The Reluctant Fundamentalist
- Vijay Prashad – The Darker Nations
- Sun Yung Shin – Skirt Full of Black
- Ed Lin* – This Is a Bust

2009

- Jhumpa Lahiri – Unaccustomed Earth
- Sesshu Foster – World Ball Notebook
- Leslie T. Chang – Factory Girls: From Village to City in a Changing China

2010

- Paul Yoon – Once the Shore
- Minal Hajratwala – Leaving India: My Family's Journey From Five Villages to Five Continents
- Ronaldo V. Wilson – Poems of the Black Object
- Jason Koo* – Man on Extremely Small Island

2011

- Yiyun Li – Gold Boy, Emerald Girl
- Kimiko Hahn – Toxic Flora
- Amitava Kumar – A Foreigner Carrying in the Crook of His Arm, A Bomb
- Ed Lin* – Snakes Can't Run: A Mystery
- Karen Tei Yamashita* – I Hotel

2012

- Roya Hakakian – Assassins of the Turquoise Palace
- Rahul Mehta – Quarantine
- Janine Oshiro – Pier
- Thaddeus Rutkowski * – Haywire

== Lifetime Achievement Award winners ==
- 2006: Maxine Hong Kingston
- 2008: David Henry Hwang
- 2009: Sonny Mehta

== See also ==
- Asian American literature
- Chinese American literature
- List of Asian American writers
- List of American writers of Korean descent
- Asian/Pacific American Awards for Literature
