= 99 Ways to Die =

99 Ways to Die may refer to:

- 99 Ways to Die (album), a 1995 album by Master P
- "99 Ways to Die" (song), a 1993 song by Megadeth
- 99 Ways to Die, a 2018 crime novel by Ed Lin
