= Shanxing Wang =

American poet

Shanxing Wang is a contemporary American poet, scientist and political activist. Wang's first full-length book, Mad Science in Imperial City, was published in 2005 by Futurepoem Books and was awarded the 2006 Asian American Literary Award for poetry. Mad Science combines Wang's past in the 1980s as an activist and scientist in China with his current life as a poet in America.

== Biography ==
He was born in Qi County, Shanxi Province of China in 1965 and studied mechanical engineering at Xi'an Jiaotong University from 1980 to 1987. As a faculty member at Beijing University of Chemical Technology, he was an active participant in the Tiananmen Square demonstrations during the spring of 1989. He moved to the United States in 1991 and did Ph.D. study in mechanical engineering at University of California at Berkeley. In 2001, he began taking creative writing classes while teaching Industrial Engineering at Rutgers University and eventually took further classes at the St. Mark's Poetry Project and Naropa University.

He currently lives in Queens, New York and is working on his second book to be published by Atelos.
