= Semi Chellas =

American screenwriter

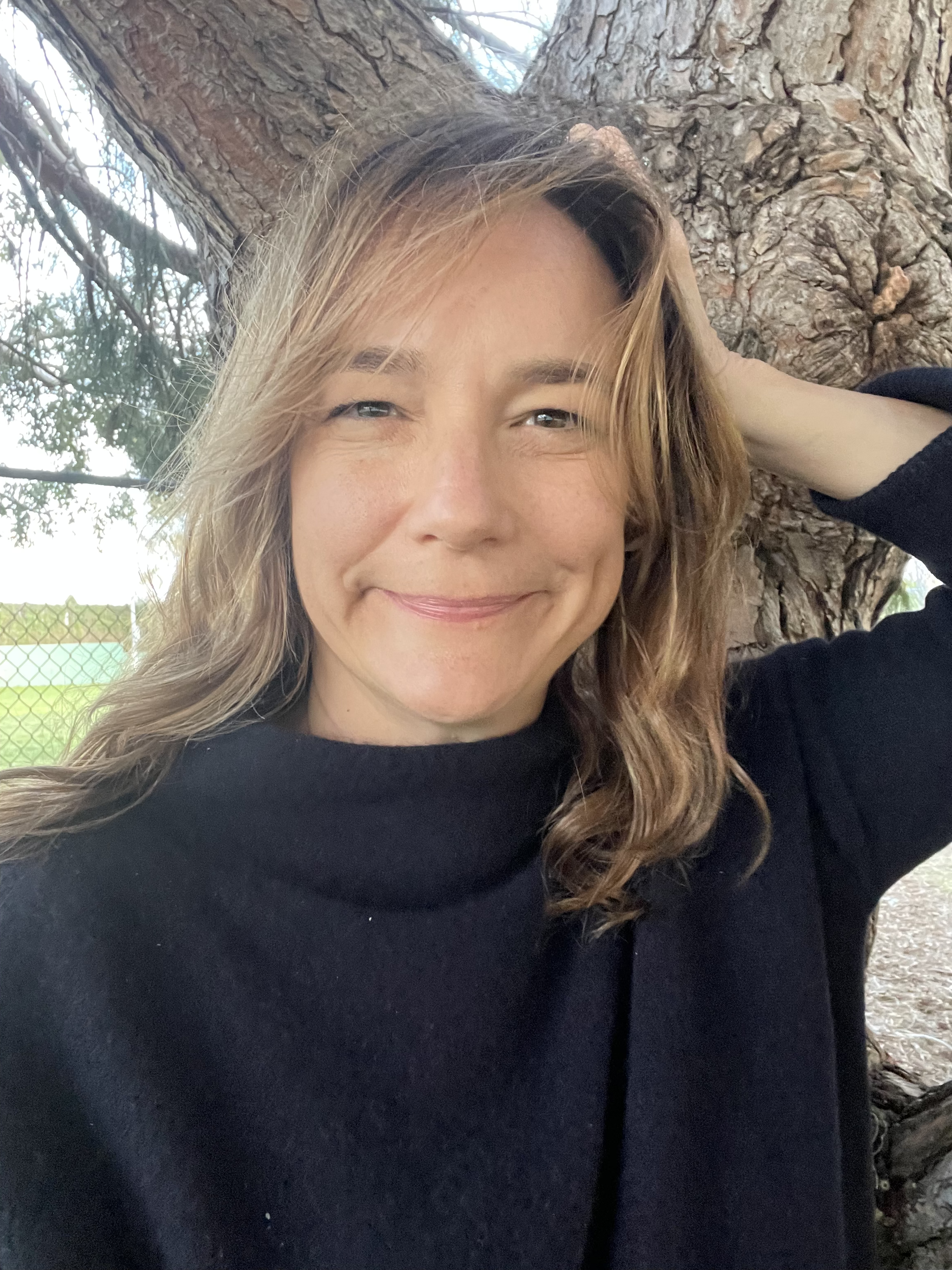
- Occupations: Screenwriter, Director, Producer

Semi Chellas (born 1969) is a director, writer, producer who has written for film, television and magazines. She was born in Palo Alto, California and grew up in Calgary, Alberta. She is known for her work on the television series Mad Men and her film adaptation of American Woman based on Susan Choi's novel of the same name.

== Education ==
She holds a B.A. in literature from Yale University and was a Mellon Fellow in English at Cornell University. She was a screenwriting resident at the Canadian Film Centre in Toronto.

== Career ==
Chellas was the co-creator with Ilana Frank and executive producer and head writer of the Canadian prime-time dramatic television series The Eleventh Hour, two-time winner of the Gemini Award (Academy of Canadian Cinema & Television award) for Best Series. Chellas and Tassie Cameron shared the Gemini for Best Writing in 2005 for the series finale, "Bumpy Cover". The series was critically acclaimed; it was nominated for more than 30 Geminis and won nine.

Chellas adapted Linda Spalding’s Who Named the Knife as a television movie entitled Murder on Her Mind; she also executive produced. She wrote the script for Picture Claire, a low-budget feature directed by Bruce McDonald. It premiered at the Toronto International Film Festival in 2001. She also wrote The Life Before This, a low-budget feature directed by Jerry Ciccoritti that premiered at TIFF in 1999; she also served as an associate producer. Her script for the Showtime/CBC television movie Restless Spirits (Canadian title: Dead Aviators) garnered her both a Gemini and a day-time Emmy nomination for Outstanding Writing in a Children's Special.

Chellas joined the American series Mad Men in season 5. She co-wrote two episodes of season 5 with Matthew Weiner. Both episodes, "Far Away Places" and "The Other Woman", were nominated for a Primetime Emmy Award for Outstanding Writing for a Drama Series. "The Other Woman" won a WGA award for Best Episodic Drama.

In season 6, Chellas wrote "Man with a Plan" and co-wrote "Favors." In season 7, she wrote "The Strategy" and co-wrote "Lost Horizon." Along with Matthew Weiner, she was nominated for an Emmy Award for Outstanding Writing for a Drama Series for "Lost Horizon." She also served as co-executive producer, running the writers room in seasons 6 and 7. Together with her colleagues on the writing staff, Chellas was nominated for the Emmy Award for Outstanding Drama Series for Mad Men in 2013, 2014, and 2015.

Chellas has directed four short films, three of which have premiered at The Toronto International Film Festival: Green Door (written by Barbara Gowdy; selected as one of Canada's Top Ten Short Films 2008 by TIFF); Trouser Accidents (included in the Best Canadian Short Films Showcase) and Three Stories from the End of Everything (nominated for a Genie Award for best live-action short); and One Tomato.

In addition, she has published short fiction and interviews in Brick, Epoch, The Malahat Review and Grain. A non-fiction piece on embedded reporters, "Good to Go", appeared in The Walrus and The Commonwealth Journalists' Quarterly''.

Semi Chellas wrote the screenplay for the movie Ophelia, directed by Claire McCarthy, which premiered at Sundance in January 2018. The film stars Daisy Ridley, George MacKay, Naomi Watts, and Clive Owen.

Chellas was an executive producer on the Amazon series The Romanoffs. She wrote the episode "Expectation" starring Amanda Peet and John Slattery.

Her feature directorial debut was American Woman starring Hong Chau and Sarah Gadon. The screenplay was written by Chellas, and she also produced the project, which premiered at Tribeca Film Festival in 2019. American Woman had its international premiere as a gala presentation at the Toronto Film Festival in September 2019.

Indiewire named Semi Chellas as one of their 25 Rising Female Filmmakers to Know in 2019. American Woman was the opening gala presentation at the Female Eye Film Festival in 2020.

At the 2019 Downtown Los Angeles Film Festival, the film won the following awards: Best Director, Best Film, Best Actress, and Best Cinematography. It won the Special Jury Prize for lead actresses Chau and Gadon at the Calgary International Film Festival in 2019. American Woman also received a special presentation at the Victoria International Film Festival in 2020 and won the Gold Remi award for period film at WorldFest-Houston in 2020.

Chellas has mentored and taught at Maisha Film Lab of East Africa, Toronto Workshop for Underprivileged Youth, Tribeca Festival's Through Her Lens, and at the Sundance Institute.

Along with Patricia Rozema, Chellas was the screenwriter in residence at the University of Toronto in 2003. She delivered The Gellman Lecture in English at Cornell University in 2016. She received the Crystal Award for Creative Excellence from Women in Film and Television Toronto (WIFT-T), as well as the Margaret Collier Award for Writing from the Academy of Canadian Cinema & Television in 2013. Chellas received the Inaugural award for Creative Excellence in 2014 at the Canadian Film Centre (presented by Norman Jewison).

== Personal life ==
Semi Chellas is now based in Los Angeles, where she lives with her partner, writer-director Mike Goldbach, and their two children.

Her interest in social change fuels much of her writing, including her Emmy nominated work on Mad Men, and her directorial debut American Woman. Her writing is influenced by social issues and themes that are pervasive in society, in particular sexism, racism and political activism. A theme in her dramatic writing is people's struggle to change.

Semi Chellas is the daughter of Brian Chellas, the philosopher.
