= No One Can Pronounce My Name =

Novel written by Rakesh Satyal

- First edition
- Author: Rakesh Satyal
- Language: English
- Subject: Novel
- Genre: Creative nonfiction, Literary criticism
- Published: Picador
- Publication date: May 2017
- Publication place: USA
- Media type: Book
- Pages: 384 pages
- ISBN: 978-12-501121-1-8

No One Can Pronounce My Name is the second novel written by Rakesh Satyal.

== Publication ==
The first edition hard cover of No One Can Pronounce My Name was published in May 2017 by Picador. Paperback version of the book was published in May 2018.
