= Ed Bok Lee =

American poet and writer

Ed Bok Lee is an American poet and writer. He is the author of three books of poetry, including Mitochondrial Night (2019), Whorled, the recipient of a 2012 American Book Award and a 2012 Minnesota Book Award in Poetry, and Real Karaoke People (New Rivers Press), the recipient of a 2006 PEN Open Book Award and a 2006 Asian American Literary Award (Members' Choice Award).

== Early life and education ==
Lee was raised in South Korea, North Dakota and Minnesota.

He studied Slavic and Central Asian Studies at the University of Minnesota; Al-Farabi Kazakh National University in Almaty, Kazakhstan; Indiana University and the University of California, Berkeley, where he was enrolled in the Ph.D. Program in Slavic Languages and Literatures. He later received a master of fine arts from Brown University.

He teaches part-time at Metropolitan State University.^{[4}

== Poetry and other writings ==
Lee primarily writes poetry, though other published works include lyric prose, plays, short stories, and what he has referred to as "poelogues", which derive technical elements from and often fall between poetry, the dramatic monologue, the soliloquy, and the duologue. Initially influenced by the poetry of Yi Sang, Vladimir Mayakovsky, Bertold Brecht, and Ai, since first visiting Los Angeles in 1992 then living throughout Russia and Central Asia from 1993 to 1995, Lee's poelogues have included accounts from a wide range of points of view: a Korean youth killed in the 1992 L.A. Riots, the younger son of an Asian immigrant grocer, a Soviet-Afghan Muslim war rebel, the first rhinoceros in space, a professional blackjack player, a professional wrestler, a Vietnamese mail order bride, an inter-dimensional being, a Korean clone, a U.S. Iraq War veteran, a U.S. Iraq War veteran's wife, conscripted Mongol foot soldiers, a DMT molecule, an immeasurable field in the multiverse, an Asian American male porn star, a Korean prostitute, an undefined particle within Dark Matter, a Hmong American hunter accused of murder (inverted poelogue), a meth cook, Asian carp (invasive species), a Norway Maple tree (invasive species), English Ivy (invasive species), an opium poppy farmer, Prince (music icon), among others.

== Select recognition ==
In 2009, Lee was a featured author at the American Library Association Conference in Chicago, IL.

In 2009, Lee was listed as one of the top 10 artists of the decade based out of the Minneapolis–Saint Paul by the Minnesota Daily.

Lee was a featured author at PEN America, New York, NY in 2010.

Lee was a featured poet at the 10th annual Sarah Lawrence College Poetry Festival in 2013.

Lee was the featured author at Chonnam National University, Gwangju, South Korea, in 2014.

Lee took up residency at the American Swedish Institute in 2014.

In 2019, Lee was a featured poet at Poets House in New York, NY.

Lee was a featured author at City Lights Books in San Francisco, CA, in 2019.

Lee was a featured author at the Asian Literature Festival in South Korea in 2020.
