= A Person of Interest (novel) =

2008 novel by Susan Choi

- First edition
- Author: Susan Choi
- Language: English
- Publisher: Viking Press
- Publication date: 31 January 2008
- Publication place: United States
- Pages: 368
- ISBN: 978-0-670-01846-8

A Person of Interest is a 2008 novel written by the American writer Susan Choi. The novel takes its title from the law enforcement term "person of interest", and draws inspiration from the activities of Theodore Kaczynski and the case of Wen Ho Lee.

== Plot ==
The novel begins with a deadly explosion in the office of Rick Hendley, a successful mathematics and computer science professor at a mid-tier midwestern university. Lee, a tenured Asian-born professor who is near retirement, is in his own office, which is next door to Hendley's, when the bomb goes off. The explosion sends Hendley to the hospital, where he eventually dies. Tired and solitary after two divorces, Lee suddenly finds himself in the public eye after the bombing. This draws Lee to the attention of the bomber, who reveals in a letter to Lee that he was once a colleague. Although not supplying his identity, Lee immediately assumes the letter is from Lewis Gaither, his old graduate school colleague.

In a series of flashbacks, the author reveals that Lewis Gaither and Lee used to be friends. Lee began an affair with Gaither's wife Aileen. Aileen eventually left Gaither and married Lee, leading to an end of Gaither and Lee's friendship. Gaither gained sole custody of his and Aileen's infant son and then soon after left the country to be an evangelical Christian missionary in a series of different locations. Because of Lee's indifference toward helping Aileen get her son back and general lack of empathy toward Aileen, Aileen eventually divorces him later. She dies a few years later.

Lee, embarrassed by the personal history with Gaither, lies about the letter to the FBI, leading them to consider him a "person of interest" to their investigation. Lee becomes increasingly disturbed by the FBI's monitoring and acts in an increasingly suspicious way. He eventually surreptitiously leaves town and drives across the country to the fictional town of Sippston, Idaho (based on Gaither's letters and other clues, this is his location) in search of Gaither. Aided by a local librarian, a friend of Gaither's who supplies him with mathematics textbooks, Lee arrives at Gaither's remote mountain shack. When he arrives, he realizes that the bomber is not Gaither (who has, in fact, been dead for many years), but Donald Whitehead, a brilliant but socially awkward colleague from graduate school who received and accepted an enviable teaching position at Berkeley before resigning with no explanation a few years later.

Lee works with the FBI, who are already in town monitoring the bomber, to apprehend Whitehead. After, Lee drives back to his hometown. He repeatedly reads an old letter from Aileen and feels that he truly understands her for the first time. Soon after, Aileen and Gaither's son finds Lee and they talk about the past together.
