= Mervin King =

Los Angeles Police Department Captain (1914–2008)

Mervin Paul King
- Born: August 1, 1914; San Francisco, California, U.S.
- Died: March 18, 2008 (aged 93); South Pasadena, California, U.S.
- Resting place: Calvary Cemetery, Los Angeles
- Known for: S.L.A. shootout
- Relatives: Married, 3 children
- Police career
- Country: United States
- Department: Los Angeles Police Department
- Service years: 1946–1976
- Rank: Sworn in as an Officer – February 25, 1946 – Sergeant – June 6, 1952 – Lieutenant – December 21, 1961 – Captain – July 12, 1970
- Awards: Numerous commendations for performance

Mervin Paul King (August 1, 1914 – March 18, 2008) was a Captain for the Los Angeles Police Department who commanded officers during the SLA shootout in 1974.

== Biography ==
King was born August 1, 1914, in San Francisco, California, as the only child to the late George and Geneva King. He served with United States Navy from 1934 to 1946 and participated in combat operations in the Pacific Theater of World War II on both the USS Hutchins, a Fletcher-class destroyer, and the USS Markab, a destroyer tender.

== LAPD career ==
Appointed in 1946 as a policeman for the Los Angeles Police Department (LAPD) (Serial Number 3224), and appointed captain in 1970, he completed 30 years of service before retiring in 1976. During his career with the LAPD, King served at Accident Investigation Division, Newton Street Division, Central Traffic Division, 77th Division, and North Hollywood Division prior to retiring from Detective Support Division in 1976.

=== SLA ===
Throughout his service the LAPD he received more than 50 commendations from both the department and outside agencies for his dedication to duty and recognition from outside law enforcement agencies. He never once received a personnel complaint. His recognition included that of the Los Angeles City Council for supervising the investigation of the Alphabet Bomber and an improvised explosive device detonated at Los Angeles International Airport. Commanding police efforts in the 1974 S.L.A. shootout led him to be commended by the Los Angeles City Council again for his supervision of the Symbionese Liberation Army (SLA) investigation, one which "broke the back and thrust of the SLA".

== Personal ==
King spent the greater part of his life as a resident of Alhambra, California, dedicated to his wife Pauline of nearly 68 years, and their family including children Terence Michael King, Thomas Patrick King, and Kathryn Mary (Brandlin); 8 grandchildren; 5 great-grandchildren. He died on March 18, 2008, in South Pasadena, California.

== LAPD Ranks ==
- Appointed Policeman February 25, 1946
- Appointed Sergeant June 6, 1952
- Appointed Lieutenant December 21, 1961
- Appointed Captain July 12, 1970
- Retired December 26, 1976
