= Flashlight (novel) =

2025 novel by Susan Choi

- 2025 book jacket
- Author: Susan Choi
- Audio read by: Eunice Wong
- Subject: Korean and Asian American fiction
- Genre: Literary realism, Historical fiction
- Set in: 1978 to the 2000s in Japan, Korea, United States
- Publisher: Farrar, Straus and Giroux, Jonathan Cape
- Publication date: June 3, 2025
- Publication place: United States, United Kingdom
- Media type: Print, eBook, Audio
- Pages: 464
- Awards: Shortlisted for Booker Prize
- ISBN: 9780374616373
- OCLC: 1458442226
- Dewey Decimal: 813.54
- LC Class: PS3553.H584 F54 2025

Flashlight is a 2025 novel by American writer Susan Choi. It was published by Farrar, Straus and Giroux in the United States and Jonathan Cape in Great Britain. The circumstance of a Korean father in 1978, presumably washed out to sea while walking near the breakwater on the beach, and the family's grief, opens the novel to a story that "spans decades, and four generations" Flashlight was shortlisted for the 2025 Booker Prize.

== Plot summary ==
The story begins with a father and his young daughter, Louisa, taking a walk at dusk. The father, named Serk, has a flashlight. When they don't come back, people start looking for them. Louisa, who is 10 years old, is later discovered near the water's edge. She is very cold and barely alive, with almost no memory of what happened. Her father, who couldn't swim, is missing and presumed to have drowned and pulled out to sea.

The novel follows Serk's family through four generations and many decades. Serk had been born as Seok in Korea and later known as Hiroshi in Japan during World War II. He changed his name to Serk when he came to the US. His different identities represent his having to deal with tumultuous changes in his environments. Serk's struggles with his identity also represent the political conflicts of the time, as major world powers fought for influence over Korea.

== Prologue ==
Ron Charles, writing for The Washington Post, noted that The New Yorker published a short story written by Choi on August 31, 2020, which is the prologue for the novel. The story is about a young girl's volatile and grief-stricken interactions with a psychologist in the aftermath of her father's drowning in Japan.

== Reception ==
According to The New York Times, Choi seems to use the book to bring attention to historical injustices, particularly those caused by North Korea. By the end of the novel, the extensive details about these historical events and their consequences, such as re-education camps, start to take over the story. The book begins to feel less like a narrative and more like a historical report or a lesson.

Writing for The Guardian, Beejay Silcox stated that "the plot twist mid-novel was a jolt that added suspense and intrigue to the work." Regarding the characters' development in the work, Silcox stated: "Choi gives her cast the room they need to live; to be more than vessels for political wrangling."

=== Awards ===
Awards for Flashlight
Year	Award	Result	Ref.
2025	National Book Award for Fiction	Longlist	
2026	Booker Prize	Finalist	
2026	Orwell Prize for Political Writing	Finalist	
2026	Women's Prize for Fiction	Finalist	
