= The Foreign Student =

1998 novel by Susan Choi

- Author: Susan Choi
- Publisher: HarperCollins
- Publication date: September 1, 1998
- Pages: 336 pp.
- ISBN: 0-06-019149-X

The Foreign Student is the first novel by Korean-American author Susan Choi, published in 1998.

== Plot ==
In 1955, 25-year-old Chang (“Chuck”) Ahn arrives at The University of the South in Sewanee, Tennessee from South Korea after the Korean War ends. He meets 28-year-old Katherine Monroe, who lives year-round in her family's summer home in Sewanee. Chuck and Katherine become friends.

Katherine is in an ill-defined relationship with an older man, Charles Addison. He was her father's former roommate and is now an English professor at the college.

Charles seduced his friend's daughter and started having sex with Katherine when she was only fourteen. The discovery of their relationship led to Katherine's mother refusing to speak to her daughter any more, a resolve she keeps up throughout Katherine's adulthood.

During his time in college, Chuck also reflects on his experience during the Korean War. He worked as a translator for the American forces.

Charles unexpectedly proposes to Katherine, who accepts. When Chuck hears news of their engagement, he leaves Sewanee for Chicago to take a summer job in a book bindery, which the dean of The University of the South had arranged for him.

After being repeatedly and falsely accused of stealing money, he steals $100 and boards a train to New Orleans. He knows that Katherine is staying there with her dying mother in her childhood home.

Katherine breaks up with Charles. She and her mother, and Chuck, go to a house on the Gulf Coast. It was a favorite place of her mother.

Chuck returns to Sewanee and promises to wait for Katherine while she cares for her mother. Chuck is expelled from the college for his theft, but nonetheless given a job there and the chance to work off his debt.

== Reception ==
Kirkus Reviews called the book, "An uneven first novel that elegantly details the love story of two young people.” A review by Publishers Weekly said, "Love develops between two troubled people from vastly different worlds in this impressive debut.” The Foreign Student won the Asian American Literary Award for Fiction.
