= Rakesh Satyal =

American novelist

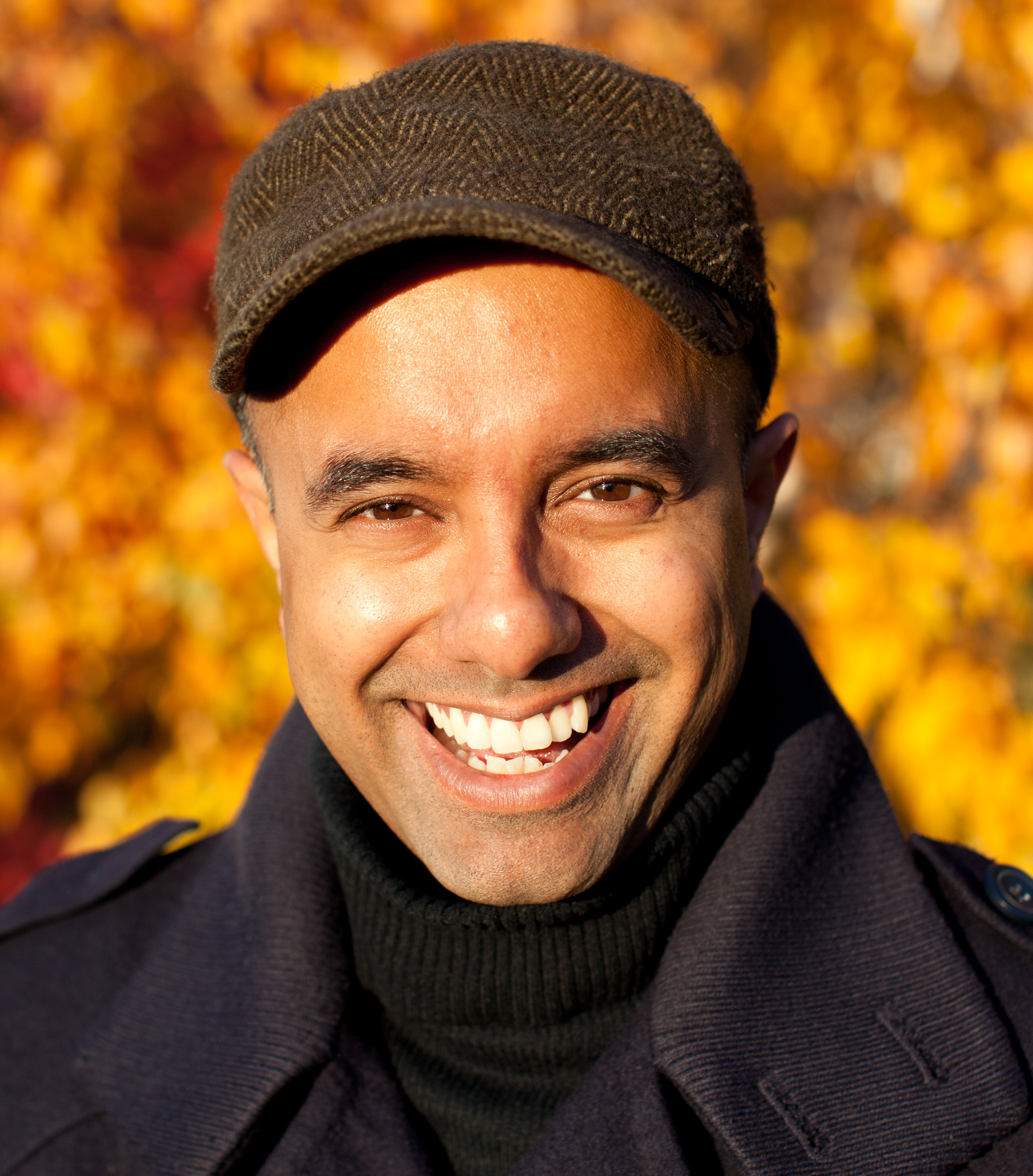
- Born: August 25, 1980 (age 46); Cincinnati, Ohio, U.S.
- Education: Princeton University (AB)
- Occupation: Novelist
- Relatives: Rajiv Satyal (brother)
- Writing career
- Notable work: Blue Boy
- Website: Official website

Rakesh Satyal is an American novelist, best known for his Lambda Literary Award-winning debut novel Blue Boy. Blue Boy won the 2009 Prose/Poetry Award from the Association of Asian American Studies and was a finalist for the Publishing Triangle's Edmund White Debut Fiction Award and Satyal was a recipient of a 2010 Fellowship in Fiction from the New York Foundation for the Arts.

== Early life ==
Rakesh Satyal was born and raised in Cincinnati, Ohio. His parents, Vinay and Lalita Satyal, emigrated to the United States from India. He has a fraternal twin brother, Vikas. His older brother is stand-up comedian Rajiv Satyal. Satyal attended Fairfield Senior High School. Satyal graduated with an A.B. in comparative literature from Princeton University in 2002 after completing a 272-page-long senior thesis, titled "Dissonance (A Novel)," under the supervision of Lynn Tillman and David Ebershoff. He was a member of the a cappella group the Princeton Nassoons. His freshman year, he created the celebration that occurs each semester on Dean's Date, where students cheer on their classmates to turn in their written work on time.

== Career ==
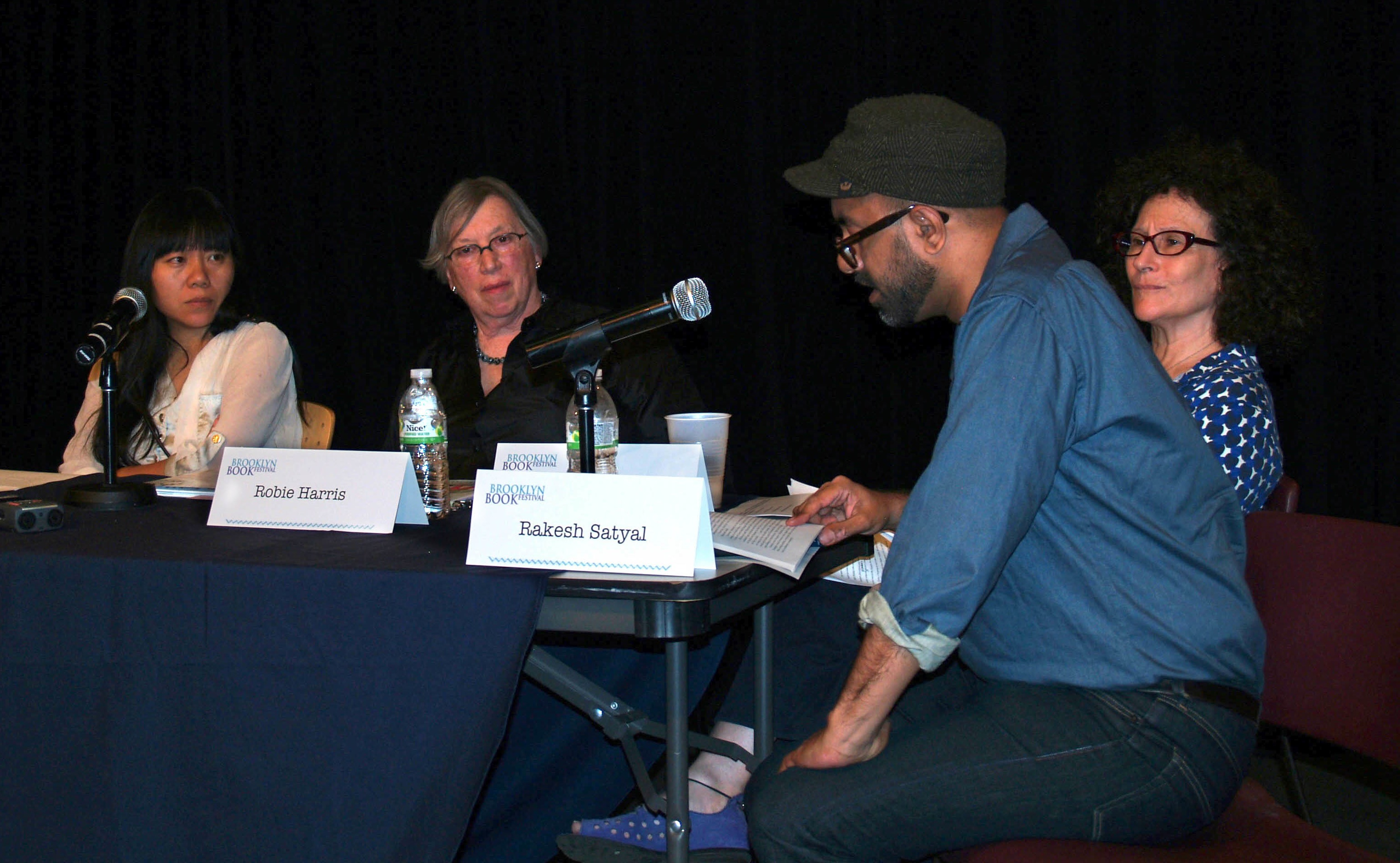
From left to right: Xiaolu Guo, Robie Harris, Satyal and Lynne Tillman speaking on the effect of government surveillance on author self-censorship, with other authors at the 2014 Brooklyn Book Festival

With the exception of a few years in the world of branding, Satyal has worked in book publishing since 2001, when he was an intern at Random House. He worked at what was formerly known as the Doubleday Broadway Publishing Group, then HarperCollins, then Atria Books, a division of Simon & Schuster. He is currently an Executive Editor at HarperOne, a division of HarperCollins. Over the course of his career, he has worked with such authors as Tori Amos, Clive Barker, Common, Daniel Lavery, Janet Mock, Terry Castle, Paulo Coelho, Joey Graceffa, Vestal McIntyre, Armistead Maupin, Michael Arceneaux, Chasten Buttigieg, Anuradha Roy, Rahul Mehta, Ann Powers, and Paul Rudnick.

Blue Boy was published in 2009. Satyal's second novel, No One Can Pronounce My Name, was published in May 2017 by Picador USA. His work has also appeared in the anthologies The Man I Might Become, Fresh Men 2, The Letter Q, and Fifty Writers on Fifty Shades of Grey. Satyal sometimes performs in New York City as a singer. His cabaret act has been mentioned in The New Yorker, the New York Observer, and Page Six. He also garnered attention for his acceptance speech at the Lambda Literary Awards gala, which he sang to the tune of Lady Gaga's "Bad Romance".

His novel 'Blue Boy' is being turned into a film by the actor, comedian, and writer Nik Dodani. His novel No One Can Pronounce My Name is being made into a film by Christine Vachon of Killer Films.

== Personal life ==
Satyal lives in New York City with his husband, John Maas, a literary agent. His brother is comedian Rajiv Satyal. He has a fraternal twin, Vikas Satyal.

== Bibliography ==
- Blue Boy (2009)
- No One Can Pronounce My Name (novel) (2017)

== See also ==
- Indians in the New York City metropolitan area
- LGBT culture in New York City
- List of LGBT people from New York City
- Literature review
- NYC Pride March
