= Trust Exercise =

2019 novel by Susan Choi

- First edition (US)
- Author: Susan Choi
- Language: English
- Genre: Coming-of-age fiction Romance
- Publisher: Henry Holt and Company (US); Serpent's Tail (UK)
- Publication date: April 9, 2019 (US); May 2, 2019 (UK)
- Publication place: United States
- Pages: 257 (1st ed US hardcover)
- Awards: National Book Award for Fiction (2019)
- ISBN: 9781250309884 (1st ed US hardcover)
- OCLC: 1033782648
- Website: website

Trust Exercise is a 2019 coming-of-age novel by the American author Susan Choi, published by Henry Holt and Company.

== Plot ==
Sarah and David are performing art students coming from different socio-economic backgrounds: Sarah lives with her mother in a working-class milieu; while David's family is financially comfortable. The two fall in love despite their contrasting circumstances, but their relationship ends in a bitter breakup.

== Background ==
=== Writing ===
Choi said that the book's setting was not as important as its location. She chose a "sprawling sort of suburban-style American city", similar to areas that she grew up in, such as Houston, Texas. She elaborated on the location to Bookish:

The other thing was that I wanted the characters to be in a place that isn't a cultural capital, or at least it isn't at the time of this story. It isn't a New York or a Los Angeles, and because they're aspiring performers they're acutely aware of being from a place that's not a cultural capital. They're always yearning for and aspiring to go where the bright lights are. That describes the place where I grew up, but it also describes so many other places. I wanted to generalize the specificity.

Choi further commented about her writing process saying, "I'm conscious of having been so mad during so much of the writing of this book ... . Like really mad." Choi explained that when she was writing the book, Donald Trump had just been elected and she was also going through personal issues stemming from her separation with her husband. Choi tapped into the reaction following the publication of the Donald Trump Access Hollywood tape, realizing that discussions about sexual abuse and harassment had taken on a new urgency.

== Reception and awards ==
Sophie Gilbert of The Atlantic wrote, "Trust Exercise is an elaborate trick; it's a meta work of construction and deconstruction, building a persuasive fictional world and then showing you the girders, the scaffolding underneath, and how it's all been welded together." Writing for The Washington Post, Ron Charles noted, "This author never takes you where you thought you were going, but have faith: You won't be disappointed." John Boyne of The Irish Times wrote, "Once in a while, a novel's plot takes such an unexpected turn, breaking the unspoken contract between reader and writer, that it's hard to know whether to fling the book at the wall in anger or proclaim it a brave attempt to push the boundaries of the form."

In November 2019, Trust Exercise was awarded the National Book Award for Fiction. In December 2019, former President Barack Obama picked it as one of his books of the year. Trust Exercise was named one of the top books of 2019 by The New York Times book critic Dwight Garner.

== Censorship ==
In August 2025, the Lukashenko regime added the book to the List of printed publications containing information messages and materials, the distribution of which could harm the national interests of Belarus.
