= Brian Leung (author) =

American fiction writer

- Born: San Diego County, California, U.S.
- Education: California State University, Los Angeles (BA, MA); Indiana University Bloomington (MFA)
- Writing career
- Language: English
- Genre: fiction
- Notable awards: Asian American Literary Award (2005)Mary McArthy Award for ShortFiction (2004)Willa Award for Historical Fiction (2011)
- Website: readbrianleung.info

Brian Leung is an American fiction writer, whose short story collection World Famous Love Acts won the 2005 Asian American Literary Award for fiction and the Mary McCarthy Award in Short Fiction. He has also written three novels.

== Personal background ==
Leung was born and grew up in San Diego County, California, to a Chinese father who had immigrated to the United States and a mother from Battleground, Washington.

He attended California State University, Los Angeles, where he earned a B.A. and MA.. He then attended Indiana University Bloomington, where he earned an MFA.

He won the Jim Duggins Outstanding Mid-Career Novelists' Prize, presented by the Lambda Literary Awards, in 2012.

== Published works ==
Leung has written the following books:

- World Famous Love Acts, Sarabande Books, 2004. ISBN 978-1-889330-16-7
- Lost Men: A Novel, Three Rivers Press, 2007. ISBN 978-0-307-35165-4
- Take Me Home: A Novel, HarperCollins, 2010. ISBN 0-06-176907-X
- Ivy Vs. Dogg: With A Cast Of Thousands!, C&R Press, 2018 ISBN 1936196638
- All I Should Not Tell, C&R Press, 2021 ISBN 9781949540192
- A Terrifying Brush with Optimism: New and Selected Stories, Sarabande Books, 2025. ISBN 1956046313
