= American Woman (novel) =

2003 novel by Susan Choi

- American Woman
- Author: Susan Choi
- Language: English
- Publisher: HarperCollins
- Publication date: 2003
- Dewey Decimal: 813.54
- LC Class: PS3553.H584 A64

American Woman is a 2003 novel written by Susan Choi, based on the 1974 kidnapping of Patty Hearst by the Symbionese Liberation Army and following events with activists.

A film adaptation of the same name was released in 2019. It is written and directed by Semi Chellas, starring Hong Chau.

== Plot ==
Japanese–American Jenny Shimada (based on the radical activist Wendy Yoshimura) is a former radical on the run from the FBI. At the request of her friend Rob Frazer (based on Jack Scott), she agrees to help shelter fugitives Yvonne (based on Emily Harris) and her husband Juan (based on William Harris), and Pauline (based on Patty Hearst) after they mistakenly give up the location of their revolutionary cadre (based on the Symbionese Liberation Army). The novel explores interactions among the group under the tension of enforced isolation in hiding.

== Reception ==
American Woman received positive acclaim from critics and it was a finalist for the 2004 Pulitzer Prize in Fiction. Writer Joan Didion said, "Susan Choi ... proves herself a natural—a writer whose intelligence and historical awareness effortlessly serve a breathtaking narrative ability. I couldn't put American Woman down, and wanted when I finished it to do nothing but read it again."

Sven Birkerts (The New York Times Book Review) said,

"American Woman becomes a love story of sorts. It takes us through a peculiar, psychologically instructive cycle, moving from the sensationalism of the daily news, to the convoluted group psychology of four differently idealistic but misguided souls struggling for their survival, to the subtlest tropisms of the heart's retrospective longing."

The San Francisco Examiner said it was a novel of "impressive scope and complexity", ... and “American Woman is a thoughtful, meditative interrogation of...history and politics, of power and racism, and finally, of radicalism.”

== Adaptations ==
It was adapted as a 2019 film of the same name, written and directed by Canadian Semi Chellas, and starring Hong Chau.
