= Mad Men season 7 =

Season of television series

Mad Men
- Season 7
- Promotional posters for both parts
- Starring: Jon Hamm; Elisabeth Moss; Vincent Kartheiser; January Jones; Christina Hendricks; Aaron Staton; Rich Sommer; Kiernan Shipka; Jessica Paré; Kevin Rahm; Christopher Stanley; Jay R. Ferguson; Ben Feldman; Mason Vale Cotton; Robert Morse; John Slattery
- No. of episodes: 14

Release
- Original network: AMC
- Original release: April 13, 2014 – May 17, 2015

Season chronology
- ← Previous; Season 6

The seventh and final season of the American television drama series Mad Men premiered on April 13, 2014, and concluded on May 17, 2015, on AMC. The season consists of 14 episodes split into two, seven-episode parts: the first half, titled "The Beginning", aired from April 13 to May 25, 2014; and the second half, titled "The End of an Era", aired from April 5 to May 17, 2015. The first part of the seventh season was released on Blu-ray/DVD on October 21, 2014, and the second half was released on October 13, 2015. Each episode in the season has a running time of approximately 48 minutes, with the exception of the final two episodes which are 54 and 57 minutes, respectively.

The first part of season 7 begins in January 1969, several weeks after the Thanksgiving 1968 ending of season 6, with characters dealing with the dynamics of lives and offices being split between New York and Los Angeles, and ends in July 1969. The second part of season 7 takes place between April and November 1970. Both halves received critical acclaim, and based on year-end lists published by television critics, Mad Men's seventh season was the seventh most acclaimed series of 2014 for its first seven episodes, and was the second most acclaimed series of 2015 for its final episodes.

== Cast ==
=== Main cast ===
- Jon Hamm as Don Draper
- Elisabeth Moss as Peggy Olson
- Vincent Kartheiser as Pete Campbell
- January Jones as Betty Francis
- Christina Hendricks as Joan Harris
- Aaron Staton as Ken Cosgrove
- Rich Sommer as Harry Crane
- Kiernan Shipka as Sally Draper
- Jessica Paré as Megan Draper
- Kevin Rahm as Ted Chaough
- Christopher Stanley as Henry Francis
- Jay R. Ferguson as Stan Rizzo
- Ben Feldman as Michael Ginsberg
- Mason Vale Cotton as Bobby Draper
- Robert Morse as Bert Cooper
- John Slattery as Roger Sterling

=== Recurring cast ===
- Harry Hamlin as Jim Cutler
- Joel Murray as Freddy Rumsen
- Stephanie Drake as Meredith
- Allan Havey as Lou Avery
- Trevor Einhorn as John Mathis
- Beth Hall as Caroline
- Teyonah Parris as Dawn Chambers
- Sola Bamis as Shirley
- Jessy Schram as Bonnie Whiteside
- Elizabeth Rice as Margaret Hargrove
- H. Richard Greene as Jim Hobart
- Talia Balsam as Mona Sterling
- Julia Ormond as Marie Calvet
- Kit Williamson as Ed Gifford
- Jill Alexander as Marsha
- Alison Brie as Trudy Campbell
- Christine Estabrook as Gail Holloway
- Elizabeth Reaser as Diana Bauer
- Juliette Angelo as Carol
- Pamela Shaddock as Loretta
- Greg Cromer as Dennis Ford
- Rachel DiPillo as Sherry
- David James Elliott as Dave Wooster
- Christine Garver as Moira
- Kiva Jump as Dee
- Johnathan McClain as Alan Silver
- Gabriella Weltman as Yolanda
- Bruce Greenwood as Richard Burghoff
- Paul Johansson as Ferg Donnelly
- Caity Lotz as Stephanie Horton

=== Guest stars ===
- Neve Campbell as Lee Cabot
- James Wolk as Bob Benson
- Larisa Oleynik as Cynthia Cosgrove
- Ray Wise as Ed Baxter
- Anne Dudek as Francine Hanson
- Brian Markinson as Dr. Arnold Rosen
- Linda Cardellini as Sylvia Rosen
- Maggie Siff as Rachel Katz (née Menken)
- Rebecca Creskoff as Barbara Katz
- Mimi Rogers as Pima Ryan
- Marten Holden Weiner as Glen Bishop
- Rich Hutchman as Bud Campbell
- Mark Moses as Herman "Duck" Phillips
- Brett Gelman as Daniel
- Evan Arnold as Leonard

== Episodes ==
No. overall	No. in season	Title	Directed by	Written by	Original release date	US viewers (millions)
Part 1: The Beginning
79	1	"Time Zones"	Scott Hornbacher	Matthew Weiner	April 13, 2014	2.27
In January 1969, as Richard Nixon delivers his inaugural speech on television, Don—suspended after losing Hershey—travels to California to repair his marriage to Megan while secretly funneling copy to Freddy. Peggy clashes with her new superior, Lou Avery, whose condescension frustrates the creative team. With Pete in Los Angeles, Ken becomes Head of Accounts and grows volatile; after a tense meeting, Joan persuades Butler Footwear's sexist new marketing chief not to drop SC&P. Roger experiments with the counterculture, and Margaret tells him she has forgiven him as part of a spiritual awakening. Pete embraces Los Angeles life, while Ted immerses himself in work and has an awkward encounter with Peggy in New York. Now a landlord, Peggy tires of tenant demands. In California, Don and Megan dine pleasantly with her agent and begin reconciling, though Don plans to split time between coasts. Megan asserts independence—driving, setting household rules, and objecting when Don buys a color television without consulting her. On his return flight, Don confides in a sympathetic widow that he has been a bad husband. Peggy cries alone on her apartment floor while Don sits outside in the cold, disheveled and near tears.
80	2	"A Day's Work"	Michael Uppendahl	Jonathan Igla and Matthew Weiner	April 20, 2014	1.89
A month later, tensions flare at SC&P on Valentine's Day. Pete secures the Southern California Chevrolet dealers' association as clients, but Cutler and the other partners insist on approval from Chevy's corporate office, frustrating Pete, who also feels adrift in California and clashes with his career-focused girlfriend Bonnie. Don declines a rival agency's recruitment overture, remaining loyal to SC&P. Peggy mistakenly believes flowers delivered to her secretary Shirley are from Ted and asks Joan for a new assistant. Sally visits the office unexpectedly, forcing Lou to awkwardly lie about Don's absence while Dawn, still secretly assisting Don and passing him information, is out buying him a Valentine's gift; Lou demands a replacement for Dawn. Observing Joan juggling personnel duties and partnership responsibilities, Cutler urges her to relinquish personnel and move fully into Accounts; despite Bert's objection to a black receptionist, Joan promotes Dawn to head of personnel. Cutler also warns Roger about becoming combative. Meanwhile, Don and Sally reconnect when he admits he is on leave, and she confesses she used a roommate's family funeral partly as a pretext to shop in Manhattan.
81	3	"Field Trip"	Christopher Manley	Heather Jeng Bladt and Matthew Weiner	April 27, 2014	2.02
In April, Don flies to Los Angeles at Megan's agent's request and inadvertently reveals he has been on leave from SC&P since the previous year; angered by the deception, Megan throws him out, and he returns to New York. Peggy's conflict with Lou worsens when she learns he submitted only Ginsberg's work for Clio consideration, excluding hers. Harry urges Cutler to acquire a computer to modernize media operations, after lying to a client that they already have one. Don secures an offer from a rival firm and presents it to Roger as leverage to regain his position. Roger agrees but neglects to inform the partners; when Don appears at the office, Roger, Joan, Cutler, and Bert debate his fate. Though Joan, Cutler, and Bert favor firing Don, Roger notes they cannot afford to buy out his partnership. Betty chaperones Bobby's school field trip and they begin to bond, but when Bobby gives away her sandwich, Betty reacts petulantly and ruins their day. Later, she continues to passive-aggressively remind Bobby of what he did, and laments to Henry that her children don't love her. Don is offered reinstatement under strict written conditions: demoted from creative director to copywriter, reporting to Lou, and subject to immediate dismissal and forfeiture of shares for any infraction. After a moment, Don agrees to the terms.
82	4	"The Monolith"	Scott Hornbacher	Erin Levy	May 4, 2014	2.14
At dinner with his girlfriend Bonnie, Pete encounters a former Vicks colleague who informs him that his father-in-law has suffered a heart attack, making Pete realize how distant he has grown from Trudy. Don moves into Lane's former office, haunted with guilt over Lane's death; he briefly discards a New York Mets pennant, but later decides to hang it in tribute. Roger learns his daughter Margaret—now calling herself "Marigold"—has joined a hippie commune; he and Mona visit, but Margaret refuses to return, citing Roger's past neglect as justification for abandoning her own maternal duties. Cutler installs an IBM computer in the creative lounge; Don befriends the installer and urges Bert to pursue the company as a client, but Bert reminds him he cannot seek business without partner approval. Pete discovers Burger Chef is reviewing McCann Erickson; the partners assign Don to the account over Lou's objections, and Lou puts Peggy in charge with a raise, hoping she or Don will fail. Peggy assigns Don and Mathis 25 taglines each; Don initially drinks and escapes with Freddy's help, but after Freddy rebukes him, he returns sober and begins producing taglines.
83	5	"The Runaways"	Christopher Manley	David Iserson and Matthew Weiner	May 11, 2014	1.86
Stan discovers a folder of Lou's cartoons, which the creative team ridicules. Anna's pregnant niece Stephanie, broke in Los Angeles, calls Don for help; he asks Megan to let her stay. Though Megan agrees, she grows insecure about Stephanie's closeness with Don and youthful freedom; she gives Stephanie $1,000 and urges her to leave. At a dinner party, Betty clashes with Henry over her outspoken views on Vietnam; after Sally breaks her nose in a golf club fight, Betty reacts angrily, and Bobby fears divorce and suggests running away with Sally. Don visits Megan in California and attends a party with her acting friends; Harry later tells him that Lou and Cutler are courting Philip Morris' Commander cigarettes and intend to fire him. Megan attempts to revive their marriage by initiating a threesome with Don and her friend Amy. Returning to New York, Don interrupts Lou and Cutler's meeting with Philip Morris executives to defend his value, citing his anti-tobacco letter. Meanwhile, Ginsberg's paranoia about the new office computer escalates into a psychotic break; he cuts off his own nipple and gifts it to Peggy; a horrified Peggy calls the authorities, who wheel Ginsberg away on a stretcher.
84	6	"The Strategy"	Phil Abraham	Semi Chellas	May 18, 2014	1.93
In June, Bob Benson learns Chevy is ending SC&P's contract but that he will be offered a position at Buick; he proposes marriage to Joan to bolster his image as a family man, but she refuses. With Chevy gone, Cutler suggests promoting the agency's computer and making Harry a partner. At a spa, Roger encounters McCann Erickson executive Jim Hobart, who signals interest in acquiring SC&P. Pete brings Bonnie to New York but abandons her to visit his daughter in Connecticut; angered by Trudy's absence and ensuing argument, he alienates Bonnie, who returns to California without him. Megan visits New York and, despite an outwardly cordial reunion with Don, removes many belongings from their apartment. Meanwhile, Peggy surveys Burger Chef locations and devises a strong campaign, but Pete insists Don deliver the pitch. After seeking Don's critique, Peggy agrees the strategy needs revision and decides to overhaul it over the weekend; while working, she and Don share a tender embrace after confiding their anxieties about the future to one another.
85	7	"Waterloo"	Matthew Weiner	Carly Wray and Matthew Weiner	May 25, 2014	1.94
Cutler moves to fire Don for breach of contract. Don calls Megan and proposes moving to California if he loses his job, but she refuses, effectively ending their marriage. Betty hosts a college friend's family, and Sally shares a kiss with one of the sons while stargazing. Ted takes Sunkist clients on a flight and, in a depressive episode, cuts the engine midair, nearly costing the account. Peggy's young neighbor Julio tells her his family is moving. With Roger, Pete, and Bert's backing, Don blocks Cutler's attempt to oust him. The nation watches the live broadcast of the first Moon landing; Bert dies in his sleep shortly afterward. With Don's future uncertain, he asks Peggy to lead the Burger Chef presentation; she delivers a successful pitch and wins the account. To counter Cutler, Roger secretly negotiates with McCann Erickson to sell 51% of SC&P while keeping it an independent subsidiary with himself as president; the partners accept five-year contracts, Don persuades Ted to agree, and Cutler relents. Harry is denied partnership. After Peggy confirms the Burger Chef win, Don imagines Bert singing "The Best Things in Life Are Free."
Part 2: The End of an Era
86	8	"Severance"	Scott Hornbacher	Matthew Weiner	April 5, 2015	2.27
In April 1970, Don, restored as creative director and back in his old office, resumes bachelor life and womanizing. After a cryptic dream about Rachel Menken, he seeks her out but learns she has died of leukemia. He becomes fixated on a diner waitress named Diana, believing they have met before; though she denies it, they begin an affair. At McCann Erickson, Peggy and Joan attend a meeting where Joan is sexually harassed, leading to a heated argument between the two afterward. Roger and Ferg Donnelly of McCann fire Ken due to McCann's lingering resentment over his role in losing Birds Eye and disparaging the agency. Though Cynthia urges Ken to leave advertising to write full-time, he instead accepts a position at Dow Chemical through his father-in-law and warns Roger and Pete he will make Dow a difficult client out of spite. Peggy dates Johnny Mathis's brother-in-law; after a drunkenly planned trip to Paris stalls when she cannot find her passport, she dismisses it as folly. Don and Diana tentatively pursue a relationship.
87	9	"New Business"	Michael Uppendahl	Tom Smuts and Matthew Weiner	April 12, 2015	1.97
Betty tells Don she is pursuing a psychology degree. Pima Ryan, a renowned commercial photographer working with SC&P, seduces Stan and unsuccessfully attempts to seduce Peggy. Struggling professionally, Megan rebuffs a sexual advance from Harry, and later accepts a $1 million divorce settlement from Don. As Marie helps Megan move out, she spitefully removes all of Don's furniture despite Megan's objections, summons Roger to pay the movers, and sleeps with him in the emptied apartment, upsetting Megan. Don continues seeing Diana, who admits she abandoned one daughter after another died. When they encounter Arnold and Sylvia in the elevator, Arnold notes Mitchell's honor from the New York Air National Guard and pointedly implies awareness of Don's past affair. Diana ultimately ends the relationship, saying Don makes her forget her daughters. Don returns home to find his apartment completely stripped.
88	10	"The Forecast"	Jennifer Getzinger	Jonathan Igla and Matthew Weiner	April 19, 2015	1.87
In May 1970, Don sells his apartment. At work, Mathis botches a pitch and, after following Don's advice to use humor, performs disastrously; he lashes out at Don, claiming he succeeds only because of his looks, prompting Don to fire him. In Los Angeles, Lou—now West Coast Creative Director—focuses more on pitching his cartoon than agency business. Joan travels west to help interview candidates for Pete's former role as Head of West Coast Accounts and begins an affair with a wealthy retiree, Richard; he initially ends things upon learning she has a child but later reconciles. As Sally prepares for a 12-day school trip, Glen visits and reveals he is deploying to Vietnam; though he first cites patriotic motives, he later admits to Betty he flunked out of college. He attempts to kiss Betty, who gently refuses him. When Sally later believes she sees Don flirting with her friend, she grows further disillusioned with both parents. Don challenges Sally to be more than just a pretty face in life.
89	11	"Time & Life"	Jared Harris	Erin Levy and Matthew Weiner	April 26, 2015	1.77
In June 1970, the partners learn McCann will dissolve SC&P and absorb its staff and accounts. Lou announces he has sold his cartoon to a Tokyo animation studio and is leaving for Japan; despite Lou's gloating, Don wishes him well. Don proposes preserving a smaller "Sterling Cooper West" to manage accounts conflicting with McCann's portfolio, but Ken refuses to bring Dow into the plan out of resentment for his firing. Don, Roger, Joan, Pete, and Ted present the idea to McCann CEO Jim Hobart, who says the merger is already in motion. Roger reveals he is involved with Marie. Ted tells Don he has divorced, with his ex-wife deciding to remain in California, and has started a new relationship with a former college girlfriend; he states his regret about his past with Peggy. Pete reunites with Trudy over Tammy's preschool crisis and punches a headmaster who insults Trudy and brings up his family's ancient feud with the Campbells; Trudy later admits her loneliness. Peggy clashes with a stage mother and confides to Stan that she once gave up a child; she also decides to join McCann. Don seeks Diana but learns she has moved away. The partners announce the absorption, unsettling the staff.
90	12	"Lost Horizon"	Phil Abraham	Semi Chellas and Matthew Weiner	May 3, 2015	1.79
At McCann, Joan faces chauvinism as her accounts are mishandled by a colleague; when she complains to Ferg, he sexually harasses her and implies he will take over her accounts. She appeals to Hobart, who offers to buy out her $500,000 partnership stake at half value. Though she threatens legal action and negative publicity, she ultimately accepts the payout after Roger advises against fighting. Peggy refuses to vacate the SC&P offices until McCann assigns her proper space, bonding with Roger in the empty office—where he plays the organ as she skates—before arriving at McCann confidently once her office is ready. Don visits Betty to pick up Sally but learns she is out; Betty, now back in school, remarks on Sally's independence. Disillusioned, Don walks out of McCann's kickoff meeting for Miller Beer and drives west, imagining a conversation with Bert. Reaching Racine, Wisconsin, he poses as a debt collector to see Diana, but her remarried ex-husband exposes him and sends him away. Don continues west toward St. Paul, Minnesota, picking up a hitchhiker, while Meredith covers for his absence and Roger tells Hobart that Don's unpredictability is part of who he is.
91	13	"The Milk and Honey Route"	Matthew Weiner	Carly Wray and Matthew Weiner	May 10, 2015	1.87
Betty is diagnosed with terminal lung cancer and refuses treatment despite Henry and Sally's objections, believing it would only prolong the inevitable; she gives Sally a letter with burial instructions and expresses pride in her. Pete dines with his brother Bud and reflects on their family's history of infidelity. Duck Phillips offers Pete a position with Learjet in Wichita, Kansas, promising a fresh start; Trudy agrees to relocate, they reconcile, and McCann buys out Pete's contract in exchange for securing Learjet and access to its corporate clientele. Don continues west and becomes stranded in rural Oklahoma when his car breaks down. He reluctantly joins a veterans' fundraiser to repair a home and, while drunk, confesses to a group of veterans that he accidentally caused his commanding officer's death in Korea, and is surprised to receive sympathy. However, the same men later assault him, suspecting he stole their fundraiser money. Don realizes a young hustler, Andy, took it; he retrieves the cash, warns Andy against dishonesty, returns the money to the veterans, then gives Andy his car. Free of all material possessions, Don smiles as he waits for a bus.
92	14	"Person to Person"	Matthew Weiner	Matthew Weiner	May 17, 2015	3.29
Don learns of Betty's cancer from Sally and urges Betty to let the children live with him, but she insists they stay with her brother and his wife; Sally cancels a trip to Madrid to care for her siblings. Ken recruits Joan to produce a Dow industry film, inspiring her to found her own production company; she invites Peggy to join, but Peggy remains at McCann, and Richard ends his relationship with Joan over her ambition. Roger announces he is marrying Marie and leaves a substantial inheritance to Kevin; Joan assures him Greg has remarried and is absent from Kevin's life. Peggy and Stan confess their love, while Pete departs with Trudy and Tammy for Wichita. Don reunites in California with Stephanie, who takes him to an oceanside retreat, but leaves after an emotional breakdown. Stranded, Don calls Peggy to say goodbye; she urges him to return, promising McCann will rehire him. At a group seminar, Don breaks down while embracing another man who feels unloved. The series concludes with McCann Erickson's 1971 "Hilltop" television advertisement for Coca-Cola.

== Reception ==
=== Critical reception ===
The seventh season of Mad Men received acclaim. The review aggregator Rotten Tomatoes reports that 90% of 510 critics reviewed the season favorably with an average score of 8.85/10. The site's consensus is: "Just in time to rekindle viewers' interest, Mad Men gets back on track for one last season, revisiting its steady, deliberate pace and style on its way to a sure-to-be-compelling climax." On Metacritic, the first part of the seventh season scored 85 out of 100 based on 26 reviews; the second part scored 83 out of 100, based on 19 reviews, both indicating "universal acclaim".

=== Accolades ===
For the 66th Primetime Emmy Awards, the first half of the season was nominated for Outstanding Drama Series, Jon Hamm was nominated for Outstanding Lead Actor in a Drama Series, Christina Hendricks was nominated for Outstanding Supporting Actress in a Drama Series, and Robert Morse was nominated for Outstanding Guest Actor in a Drama Series. For the 67th Writers Guild of America Awards, the series was nominated for Best Drama Series and Jonathan Igla and Matthew Weiner were nominated for Best Episodic Drama for "A Day's Work".

For the 31st TCA Awards, the series was nominated for Program of the Year and Outstanding Achievement in Drama, and Hamm won for Individual Achievement in Drama. For the 67th Primetime Emmy Awards, Jon Hamm won for Outstanding Lead Actor in a Drama Series after eight consecutive nominations. The series received nominations for Outstanding Drama Series, Elisabeth Moss for Outstanding Lead Actress in a Drama Series, Christina Hendricks for Outstanding Supporting Actress in a Drama Series, Semi Chellas and Matthew Weiner for Outstanding Writing for a Drama Series for "Lost Horizon", and Weiner in the same category for "Person to Person". For the 68th Writers Guild of America Awards, the series won for Best Drama and Matthew Weiner was nominated for Best Episodic Drama for "Person to Person". For the 22nd Screen Actors Guild Awards, the cast was nominated for Best Drama Ensemble and Jon Hamm was nominated for Best Drama Actor. For the 73rd Golden Globe Awards, Jon Hamm won for Best Drama Actor. For the 68th Directors Guild of America Awards, Matthew Weiner was nominated for Outstanding Directing – Drama Series for "Person to Person".
