= My Education (novel) =

Novel by Susan Choi

- Author: Susan Choi
- Language: English
- Genre: Literary fiction
- Publisher: Viking Press
- Publication date: July 3, 2013
- Media type: Print (hardcover, paperback), Audio
- ISBN: 9780670024902

My Education is the fourth novel by American author Susan Choi, published July 3, 2013 by Viking Press.

== Plot ==
Regina Gottlieb arrives at a prestigious university (unnamed but recognizable as Cornell) to start graduate school. She becomes a teaching assistant for professor Nicholas Brodeur, who has a reputation for having relationships with students. At a dinner party at Nicholas's home, Regina begins a torrid affair with Martha Hallett, Nicholas's wife and a professor at the same university. Regina falls deeply in love with Martha and is distraught when Martha sleeps with Dutra, Regina's medical student roommate, and breaks off their relationship. Regina begins sleeping with Nicholas, Martha divorces Nicholas, and Regina eventually drops out of school.

Years later, Regina is married and has a young son. She lives in New York City and works on writing her second novel, balancing her career and family in a way that mirrors the balance Martha had in the beginning of the book. She occasionally sees Dutra, who is a surgeon living in the same city. Regina eventually comes to learn that Dutra was deeply in love with Martha, and hasn't loved anyone in the same way since. When Dutra is forced out of the hospital because of a scandal contrived by rival surgeons, he moves to California. Martha also lives in California. Regina flies to California, sleeps with Martha once, and then sets her up with Dutra before flying back to her family.

== Reception ==
Meg Wolitzer of NPR wrote, "The writing in this novel is masterful — but the book did something to me emotionally, too. I felt like I was in an obsessive relationship with it. I wanted to read it all the time. And it wasn't only the story, or the characters, or their passion. It was the excitement of reading a writer whose work reminds you — actually educates you — about the power of a really good novel." Marion Winik of New York Newsday wrote, "Susan Choi's My Education is a chaise-longue literary page-turner par excellence: sexy, smart, well-plotted, jammed with observations witty and profound, and so well-written it occasionally leaves you gasping." Natasha Post Rosow of the Los Angeles Review of Books wrote, "My Education did not deliver, leaving me not only neutral on the erotic front but glaringly unenlightened, above all."

My Education won the Lambda Literary Award for Bisexual Fiction in 2014 and was shortlisted for the Bad Sex in Fiction Award in 2013.
