= Troublemaker and Other Saints =

2001 book

- Author: Christina Chiu
- Publisher: Putnam Press
- Publication date: 2001

Troublemaker and Other Saints is a short story collection by Christina Chiu. It was published in 2001 by Putnam Press.

== Contents and themes ==
The book contains 11 short stories which follow the lives of different members of a Chinese American community. Each story deals with themes of intergenerational conflict in the Chinese diaspora, racism, homophobia, and gender inequality.

== Reception ==
The book received mostly positive reviews from critics. Entertainment Weekly critic Allyssa Lee considered its portrayal of marginalized characters to be authentic and free of cliches. Publishers Weekly praised its prose, characterization and exploration of the Asian-American experience in a starred review. Kirkus Reviews praised its "rude wit and raw emotional force".
