= Symbionese Liberation Army =

American militant organization (1973–1975)

- Flag/banner of the Symbionese Liberation Army
- Other name: United Federated Forces of the Symbionese Liberation Army
- Leaders: Donald DeFreeze, aka "General Field Marshal Cinque" (killed himself on May 17, 1974, aged 30), Bill Harris, aka "General Teko" (captured in 1975)
- Dates active: 1973–1975
- Headquarters: San Francisco and Los Angeles
- Active regions: California, United States
- Ideology: Feminism; Anti-racism; Anti-capitalism; New Left; Vanguardism; Anti-fascism
- Political position: Far-left
- Size: 22 at height

The United Federated Forces of the Symbionese Liberation Army (SLA) was a small, American far-left militant organization active between 1973 and 1975; it claimed to be a vanguard movement. Six members died in a May 1974 shootout with police in Los Angeles. The three surviving fugitives recruited new members, but nearly all of them were apprehended in 1975 and prosecuted.

The pursuit and prosecution of SLA members lasted until 2003, when former member Sara Jane Olson, another fugitive, was convicted in a plea bargain and sentenced for second-degree murder related to a 1975 bank robbery by the SLA in Carmichael, California.

During its existence from 1973 to 1975, the group murdered at least two people, and committed armed bank robberies, attempted bombings and other violent crimes, including the kidnapping in 1974 of newspaper heiress Patty Hearst. Its spokesman was escaped convict Donald DeFreeze, but Patricia Soltysik and Nancy Ling Perry were believed to share group leadership.

In November 1973, the previously unknown SLA assassinated Marcus Foster, the black Superintendent of Oakland Public Schools, and wounded his deputy superintendent Robert Blackburn. This murder alienated the SLA from the local radical community.

From the beginning, the small group overwhelmingly comprised white members. After Thero Wheeler left in October 1973, disagreeing with plans for violence, DeFreeze was the SLA's only black member. Joe Remiro was Chicano, described as white in a February 1974 article in The New York Times. He had been active for a time in the Latino activist group Venceremos before it disbanded in 1973.

== Ideology and symbols ==
In their manifesto "Symbionese Liberation Army Declaration of Revolutionary War & the Symbionese Program,” co-founders Donald DeFreeze and Patricia "Mizmoon" Soltysik wrote:

The name 'symbionese' is taken from the word symbiosis and we define its meaning as a body of dissimilar bodies and organisms living in deep and loving harmony and partnership in the best interest of all within the body.

The group intended the political symbiosis to encompass the unity of all left-wing struggles: feminist, anti-racist, anti-capitalist, and others. They wanted all races, genders, and ages to fight together in a left-wing united front, and to live together peacefully.

The group adopted a seven-headed hydra-like cobra symbol as a logo. The SLA featured this image on their publications.

== History ==
=== Formation: DeFreeze escapes prison ===
The SLA formed after the escape from prison by Donald DeFreeze, who took the name "General Field Marshal Cinque." He had been serving five years to life for robbing a prostitute. DeFreeze took the name Cinque from the leader of the slave rebellion that took over the slave ship Amistad in 1839.

DeFreeze escaped from Soledad State Prison on March 5, 1973, by walking away while on work duty in a boiler room located outside the perimeter fence.

Some sources have suggested that DeFreeze was an informant from 1967 to 1969 for the Public Disorder Intelligence Unit of the Los Angeles Police Department.

Venceremos associates and future SLA members Willie Wolfe and Russell Little, concerned with the potential for exposure through surveillance at the high-profile Peking House, arranged for DeFreeze to move in with their associate Patricia Soltysik in the relative anonymity of Concord, California. DeFreeze and Soltysik became lovers and began to outline the plans for founding the "Symbionese Nation".

=== 1973 ===
==== Murder of Marcus Foster ====
On November 6, 1973, in Oakland, California, two members of the SLA killed school superintendent Marcus Foster and badly wounded his deputy, Robert Blackburn, as the two men left an Oakland school board meeting. The hollow-point bullets used to kill Foster had been packed with cyanide.

Although Foster had been the first black school superintendent of any major public school system, the SLA condemned him in their flyers for his supposed plan to introduce identification cards into Oakland schools, calling him "fascist." Foster had already gained the support of the school board to change the proposal.

Some SLA members had mistakenly believed that killing Foster would gain support for them in the Black community and help them recruit new members; instead they alienated most black people and other leftists. Harry Reynolds, a deputy superintendent in the system, said those who published the flyers had "irresponsible flapping at the mouth." In addition, he said "somebody didn't like this guy [Foster] bringing all these people together. They may have been jealous of the type of progress he was making."

Robert Blackburn, who served for a time as acting superintendent, later discussed how wrong the SLA was:

These were not political radicals, Blackburn said of the SLA. They were uniquely mediocre and stunningly off-base. The people in the SLA had no grounding in history. They swung from the world of being thumb-in-the-mouth cheerleaders to self-described revolutionaries with nothing but rhetoric to support them.

On January 10, 1974, Russell Little and Joseph Remiro, also SLA founding members, were arrested during an armed encounter with police. After police found extensive SLA materials at a house the group was renting, the two were charged with Foster's murder. Both men were convicted of murder in 1975 and sentenced to life imprisonment. Seven years later, on June 5, 1981, Little's conviction was overturned by the California Court of Appeal. He was later acquitted in a retrial in Monterey County.

Russell Little said later that in fact Soltysik had shot Foster, and Nancy Ling Perry and DeFreeze had shot Blackburn.

=== 1974 ===
==== Kidnapping of Patty Hearst ====
After Remiro and Little were arrested, the remaining SLA members considered kidnapping an important figure in order to negotiate the release of their jailed comrades. The US Federal Bureau of Investigation (FBI) found documents at one abandoned safe house revealing an action was planned for the "full moon of January 7". The FBI did not take any precautions, and the SLA did not act until a month later.

On February 4, 1974, publishing heiress Patty Hearst, a sophomore at the University of California, Berkeley, was abducted from her Berkeley residence at Apartment 4, 2603 Benvenue Avenue. This was less than three months after a November 1973 San Francisco Chronicle story announcing her betrothal to Steven Weed, which published their address. The SLA choice of Hearst was for maximum news coverage of their action.

The SLA next demanded a ransom from the Hearsts in the form of a food distribution program. The value of food to be distributed fluctuated: on February 23 the demand was for $4 million; it peaked at $400 million. The Hearsts created an organization, People in Need, which distributed free food, though the operation was halted when violence erupted at one of the four distribution points. The crowds were much greater than expected, and people were injured as panicked workers threw boxes of food off moving trucks into the crowd. The SLA then demanded that a community coalition called the Western Addition Project Area Committee be given charge of food distribution. The committee organized the distribution of 100,000 bags of groceries at 16 locations across four counties between February 26 and the end of March.

==== Conditions of early captivity of Patty Hearst ====
Terence Hallinan, the first attorney who represented Hearst, was planning to argue involuntary intoxication, a side effect of which is amnesia.

Hearst's attorney F. Lee Bailey used the Stockholm syndrome argument as part of her defense at trial. He claimed that she had been confined in a closet barely large enough for her to lie down in; that her contact with the outside world was regulated by her captors; and that she was regularly threatened with execution. Hearst's lawyer said that she had been raped by both DeFreeze and Wolfe. Both men were among those who died in 1974 in a firefight with police. The SLA publicly claimed to be holding Hearst according to the conditions of the Geneva Conventions.

The SLA subjected Hearst to indoctrination in SLA ideology. In Hearst's taped recordings, used to announce demands and conditions, on day thirteen of her capture, Hearst can be heard extemporaneously expressing SLA ideology.

==== Hibernia Bank robbery ====
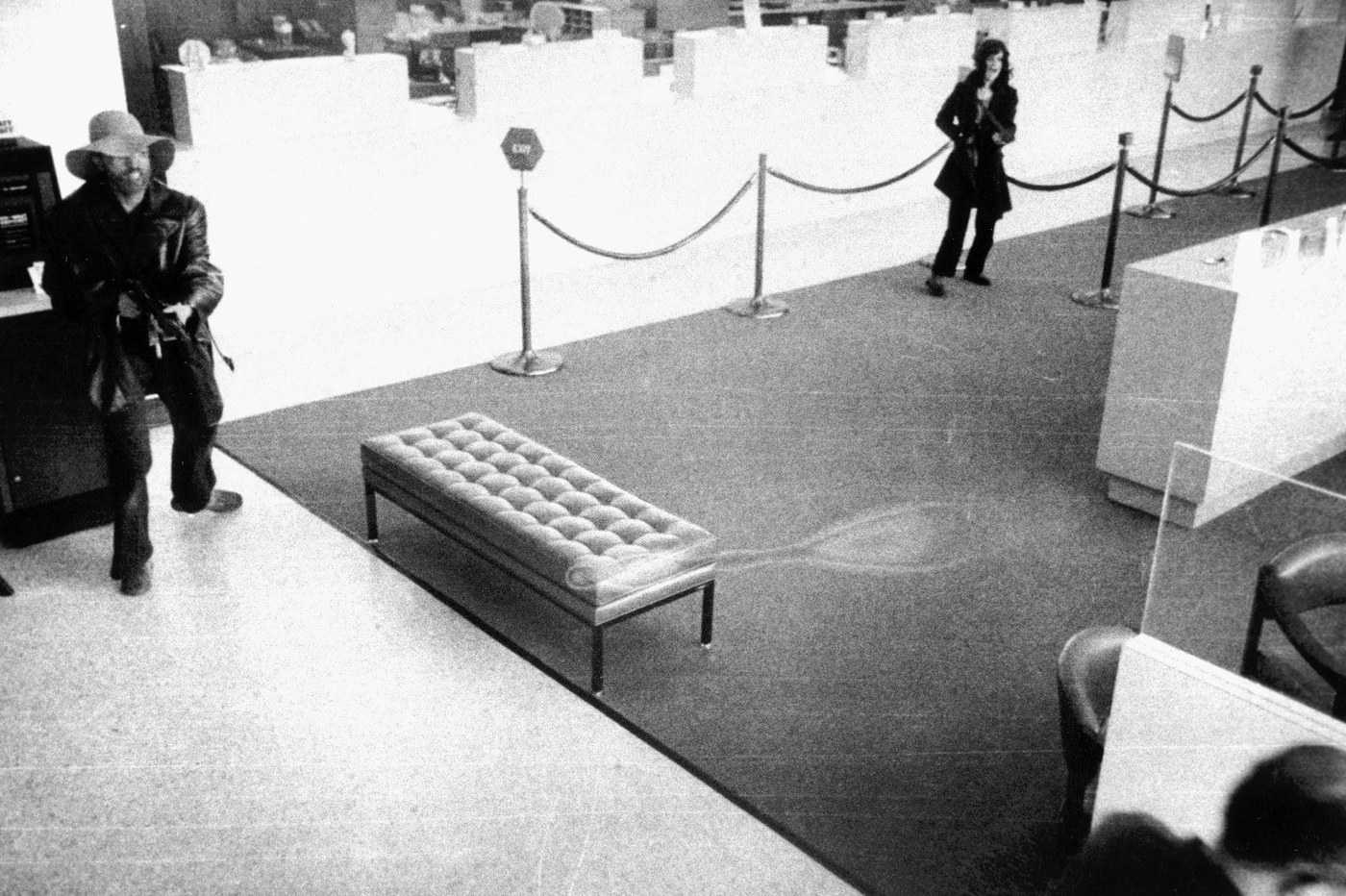
Patty Hearst (right) yelling commands at bank customers. SLA leader Donald DeFreeze can be seen to the left

The SLA's next action was the armed robbery of the Hibernia Bank branch at 1450 Noriega Street in San Francisco, on April 15, 1974. The group needed money and chose this site, because they wanted to make a public statement and knew it had cameras, but they shot and wounded two people in the course of the robbery.

At 10:00 a.m., three armed SLA members rushed into the bank, including Hearst holding a rifle. Security camera footage of Hearst was carried internationally. In her memoir, Every Secret Thing, she denied having participated willingly in the robbery and said she was threatened by other members. The group took more than $10,000 in the robbery.

Hearst later pleaded guilty and was sentenced to seven years in prison on charges related to this. After she served two years in prison, President Jimmy Carter commuted the remainder of her sentence. President Bill Clinton gave her an official pardon.

==== Move to Los Angeles ====
The SLA believed it had to recruit new members and recognized that it had alienated the radical community in the Bay Area by assassinating Marcus Foster. Cinque suggested moving the organization to his former neighborhood in South Central Los Angeles, where he had friends whom they might recruit. The SLA had difficulty getting established there. They relied on commandeering housing and supplies, generating resentment among the people who protected their secrecy and security.

At this stage, SLA member Russell Little, who was being held in jail pending a trial, said that he believed the SLA had entirely lost sight of its goals. He believed they got sidetracked into a confrontation with the Los Angeles Police Department rather than educating the public in a political dialogue.

On May 16, 1974, William and Emily Harris entered Mel's Sporting Goods Store in the Los Angeles suburb of Inglewood, California, to shop for supplies. While Emily made the purchases, Bill decided to shoplift a bandolier. When a security guard confronted him, Bill Harris brandished a revolver. The guard knocked the gun out of his hand and handcuffed William's left wrist. Hearst, on armed lookout from the group's van across the street, began shooting at the store's overhead sign. Everyone in the store but the Harrises took cover, and the couple fled the store, jumping into the van and escaping with Hearst.

The SLA abandoned the van, but because of the shoplifting and shooting, police examined the vehicle. They found a parking ticket that had the address of the group's new location (their so-called safe house.) The rest of the SLA fled that house after seeing news coverage of the shooting at the sports shop. The SLA took over a house occupied by Christine Johnson and Minnie Lewisin, at 1466 East 54th Street. Among those in the house at the time was a 17-year-old neighbor named Brenda Daniels, who was sleeping on the couch.

Daniels recalls the events that night:

I went down to Minnie's every Thursday evening to play some cards and drink a little. I fell asleep early and when I woke up around two a.m. I saw four white women and three dudes—two blacks and one white. I saw guns spread out all over the floor, an' I asked them why they had guns, more than I'd ever seen in my life. They didn't answer, and, instead, the black dude asked me my name and then introduced me to everyone.

[When asked if Patty Hearst was there]

Man, how can I tell? All white women look the same to me.

— Brenda Daniels

==== Police shootout ====
The next day, an anonymous phone call to the Los Angeles Police Department (LAPD) said that several heavily armed people were staying at the caller's daughter's house. That afternoon, more than 400 LAPD officers, under the command of Captain Mervin King, along with FBI agents, Los Angeles County Sheriff's Department (LASD), California Highway Patrol (CHP), and Los Angeles Fire Department (LAFD), surrounded the neighborhood. The leader of a SWAT team used a bullhorn to announce, "Occupants of 1466 East 54th Street, this is the Los Angeles Police Department speaking. Come out with your hands up!"

A young child walked out, along with an older man. The man said that no one else was in the house, but the child intervened, saying there were several people and they had guns and ammunition. After several more attempts to get people to leave the house, a member of the SWAT team fired tear gas projectiles into the structure. SLA members responded with bursts of automatic gunfire, and a violent gun battle began. The police were firing semi-automatic AR-15 and AR-180 rifles. The SLA members were armed with M1 carbines that had been converted to fully automatic fire. Police also reported that the SLA had made homemade grenades from 35 mm film canisters, and had thrown them at responding officers.

During the shootout, police continued to fire dozens of tear gas grenades into the house, attempting to force out the SLA members. About two hours into the shootout, the house caught fire, probably due to an exploding tear gas canister. As the house began to burn, two women left from the rear and one came out to the front (she had come in drunk the previous night, passed out, and woken up in the middle of the siege); all were taken into custody, but were found not to be SLA members.

Automatic weapons fire continued from the house. At this point, Nancy Ling Perry and Camilla Hall came out of the house. Police later said they fatally shot Hall in the head as she aimed a weapon toward them; Perry was shooting at them, and they shot her twice. After Hall fell to the ground, Atwood pulled her body back into the house. Perry's body remained outside the house.

The rest died inside, from smoke inhalation, burns and gunshot wounds. The coroner's report concluded that Donald DeFreeze died by suicide, shooting himself in the side of the head. Atwood, Willie Wolfe, and Patricia Soltysik died of smoke inhalation and burns. After the shooting stopped and the fire was extinguished, police recovered 19 firearms—including rifles, pistols, and shotguns. It was one of the largest police shootouts in U.S. history with a reported total of over 9,000 rounds being fired (4,000 by the SLA and 5,000 by police). There were no casualties among law enforcement, firefighters, or civilians outside the house.

The SLA leadership was decimated: Donald DeFreeze (General Cinque), Patricia Soltysik (Mizmoon or Zoya) and Nancy Ling Perry had all died. The other dead were also founding members: Angela Atwood ("General Gelina"), Camilla Hall ("Gabi"), and Willie Wolfe ("Kahjoh", misspelled by the media at the time as "Cujo"). Perry's body was outside, but the others were all found in a crawl space under the house, which had burned down around them.

Area TV stations all covered the shootout and conflagration. They took advantage of new broadcasting technology, such as smaller portable cameras that made their mobile units more nimble, making this the first shootout to be broadcast live on television. Holed up in a hotel in Anaheim, the Harrises and Hearst watched the siege and destruction live on TV from their room.

=== 1975 ===
==== Return to the Bay Area ====
Emily and William Harris, a married couple who were founding members, remained at large as fugitives with Hearst. Claiming to lead the SLA, they later picked up a few more members and committed more crimes, including the 1975 armed robbery of a bank in Carmichael, California, in which a customer was killed.

Most of the small group were apprehended in 1975 and brought to trial; most accepted plea deals and served several years in prison.

Initially the Harrises and Hearst stayed in the Bay area. By early the next year, Bill and Emily Harris were leaders. They had taken refuge with Hearst for a period on the East Coast, where they were aided by former radical Wendy Yoshimura from San Francisco.

After the four returned to the Bay area, the SLA members recruited activists and siblings Steve and Kathleen Soliah, Kathleen's boyfriend James Kilgore, and Michael Bortin. Except for Yoshimura, who was Japanese American and born at the internment camp where her parents were held during World War II, all the new members were white.

==== Crocker Bank robbery ====
On April 21, 1975, the SLA members conducted an armed robbery of the Crocker National Bank branch in Carmichael, California, in the Sacramento area. During the robbery, Emily Harris discharged her shotgun and accidentally shot and killed customer Myrna Lee Opsahl, a 42-year-old mother of four children. Five SLA members were ultimately charged in this murder and robbery.

After being apprehended following years as fugitives, four of them pleaded guilty to reduced charges in early 2002.

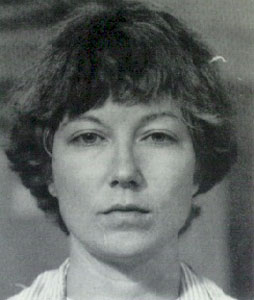
Emily Harris 1975 mugshot

==== Hearst capture, trial and conviction ====
After a long and highly publicized search, Hearst was captured on September 18, 1975, along with the Harrises, Steven Soliah, and Yoshimura; they had been found in San Francisco safe houses. In Hearst's arrest affidavit, she claimed that SLA members had used LSD to drug her and had forced her to take part in the bank raid.

She was convicted of the Hibernia Bank robbery and sentenced to seven years in prison. After she had been in prison for 21 months, US President Jimmy Carter commuted the sentence to time served. She was pardoned by President Bill Clinton. The Harrises were convicted for their part in the Hearst kidnapping and spent eight years in prison. Police allegedly consulted psychics in searching for Hearst.

=== Aftermath ===
On February 26, 1976, a Los Angeles county grand jury indicted Kathleen Ann Soliah on explosives and conspiracy charges. She was accused of planting pipe bombs under two LAPD squad cars in August 1975, intending to kill police officers in retaliation for the six SLA members who died in the May 17, 1974 shootout in Los Angeles. The devices did not detonate.

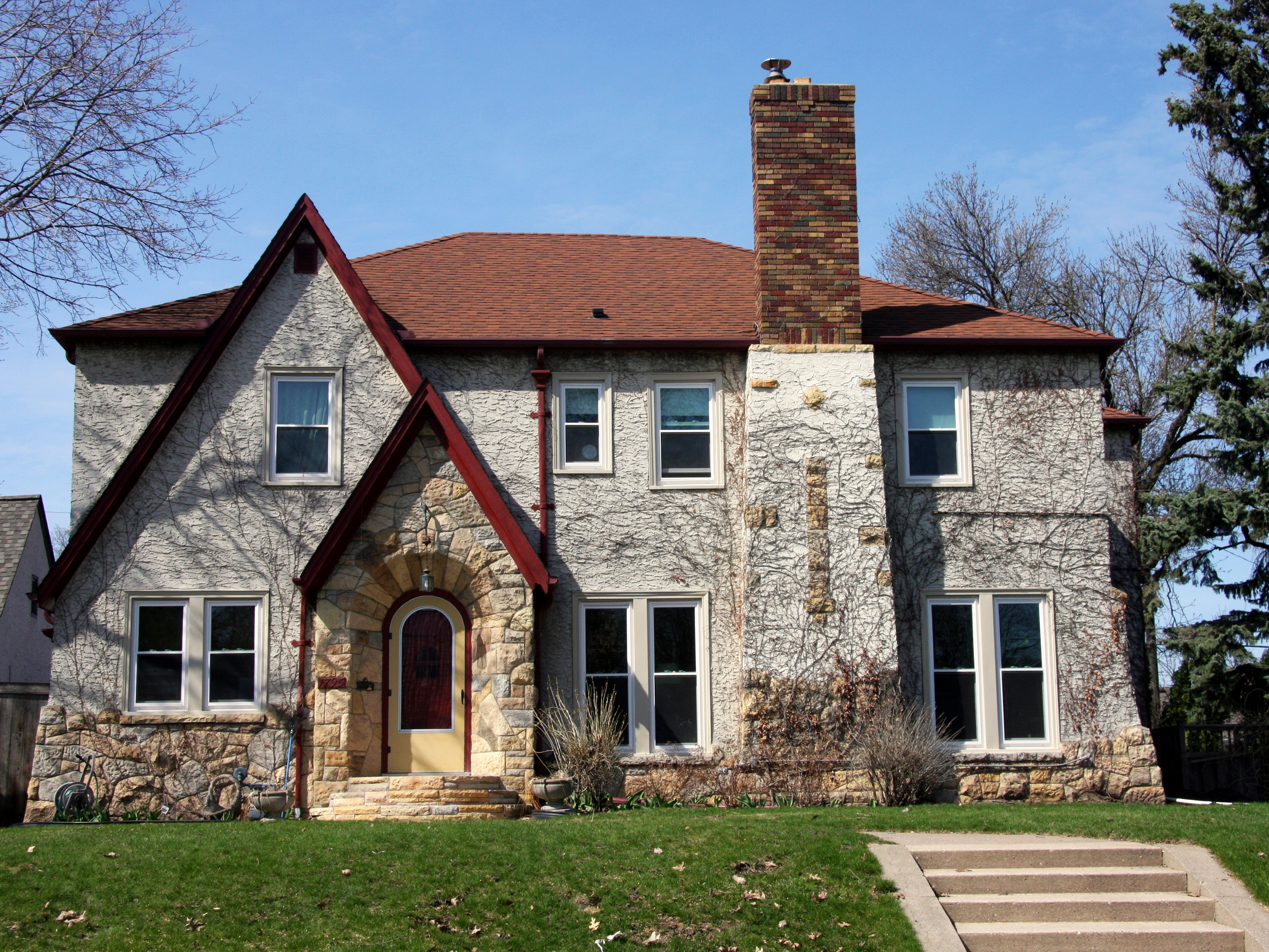
The house where Soliah lived as a fugitive in Saint Paul, Minnesota

Soliah went on the run, eventually moving to Minnesota. She lived as a fugitive for 21 years, changing her name and creating a new upper-middle-class life under the alias Sara Jane Olson. She married a doctor and they had three daughters.

The FBI arrested Soliah/Olson in 1999 after a tip was received by the television show America's Most Wanted, which had twice aired her profile. She was prosecuted in Los Angeles by its deputy district attorneys. Before going to trial in 2001, she pleaded guilty to possession of explosives with the intent to murder and was sentenced to two consecutive terms of ten years to life. In negotiation of the plea bargain, she had been told that she would serve no more than eight years. She attempted to change her plea, telling the judge that she had pleaded guilty only because she believed she could not receive a fair trial for bombing charges after the 9/11 terrorist attacks. She said that she was innocent of the making, possessing, or placing of the pipe bombs. The judge refused her request.

The Opsahl murder/Crocker bank robbery cold case had been pursued due to new evidence developed through the efforts of the Los Angeles deputy district attorneys who had prosecuted Olson. On January 16, 2002, first-degree murder charges for the killing of Myrna Opsahl were filed against Sara Jane Olson, Emily Harris, William Harris, Michael Bortin, and James Kilgore in Sacramento. All were living "above ground" and were quickly arrested except for Kilgore. He had been living in South Africa and remained at large for nearly another year.

On November 7, 2002, Olson, the Harrises, and Bortin pleaded guilty to reduced second-degree murder charges. The Harrises had divorced, and Emily had taken back her surname of Montague. She admitted to holding the murder weapon at the bank but said that the shotgun had gone off accidentally. Hearst had earlier said that Montague had dismissed the murder at the time saying, "She was a bourgeois pig anyway. Her husband is a doctor." In court, Montague denied having said this. She added, "I do not want [the Opsahl family] to believe that we ever considered her life insignificant."

Sentences were handed down on February 14, 2003, in Sacramento for the four defendants in the Opsahl murder case. Montague was sentenced to eight years for second degree murder. Her former husband, William Harris, was sentenced to seven years, and Bortin to six years. Olson was sentenced to six years, adding two consecutively to the 14-year sentence she had already received. All sentences were the maximum allowed under their plea bargains.

On November 8, 2002, James Kilgore was arrested in South Africa after having been a fugitive since 1975. He was extradited to the United States to face federal explosives and passport fraud charges. Prosecutors alleged that a pipe bomb had been found in Kilgore's apartment in 1975 and that he had obtained a passport under a false name. He pleaded guilty to the charges in 2003.

Sara Jane Olson was expecting to receive a sentence of 5 years and 4 months, but "in stiffening Olson's sentence ..., the prison board turned to a seldom-used section of state law, allowing it to recalculate sentences for old crimes in light of new, tougher sentencing guidelines." Olson was sentenced to 14 years — later reduced to 13 years — plus six years for her role in the Opsahl killing.

As a state's witness, Hearst had been given immunity, but the plea bargains meant that no trial was held and she never testified on this case.

On April 26, 2004, Kilgore was sentenced to 54 months in prison for the explosives and passport fraud charges. He was the last remaining SLA member to face federal prosecution.

After serving six years of her prison sentence, Sarah Jane Olson was released on parole. She reunited with her family in California on March 17, 2008. But after a discovery that her release was premature because of a clerical error, she was arrested at Los Angeles International Airport and notified that her right to travel out of state had been rescinded. She was returned to prison for a year.

On March 17, 2009, Sarah Olson was released after serving seven years of her 14-year sentence. She was to check in with her parole officer in Los Angeles where it would be determined if she would be allowed to serve her parole in Saint Paul, Minnesota, with her husband and three daughters. Several officials, including the Governor of Minnesota, urged that she serve her parole in California, but she was finally allowed to return to Minnesota and serve it there.

On May 10, 2009, James Kilgore was released from prison in California.

On September 10, 2026 William Harris died of a heart attack at the age of 81 years old.

== Known members ==
=== Founding members ===
- Donald DeFreeze (General Field Marshal Cinque Mtume), an escaped prisoner and major spokesman of the SLA, died by suicide during a police shootout in Los Angeles on May 17, 1974
- Patricia Soltysik, alias Mizmoon Soltysik (Zoya), major theorist with Perry, killed in LAPD shootout on May 17, 1974
- Nancy Ling Perry (Fahizah), major theorist with Soltysik, killed in LAPD shootout on May 17, 1974.

These three were responsible for the assassination of Marcus Foster and wounding of his deputy.

- Thero Wheeler (Bayo), left the SLA after rejecting their turn to armed conflict and receiving death threats from DeFreeze.
- Mary Alice Siem, Wheeler's girlfriend, left the SLA after receiving death threats from DeFreeze.
- Russell Little (SLA pseudonym Osceola or Osi), arrested and convicted for the shooting of Marcus Foster. Little was in custody during the time when Patty Hearst was with the SLA. Little was sentenced to life in prison in April 1975. He appealed, winning a new trial in 1981 at which he was acquitted of the Foster murder. He now lives in Hawaii.
- Joseph Remiro (Bo), arrested with Russell Little and convicted of Foster's fatal shooting. The SLA tried to gain freedom for Little and Remiro after their kidnapping of Hearst. Remiro was sentenced to life in prison in April 1975. He is serving the sentence at Pelican Bay State Prison, Crescent City, California. By 2004, he had been denied parole a dozen times. However, in 2024, author Roger Rappaport said that Remiro had been paroled in 2018, though this was not publicized at the time.
- William (Willie) Wolfe (Kahjoh), killed in LAPD shootout on May 17, 1974.
- Angela Atwood (General Gelina), killed in LAPD shootout on May 17, 1974.
- Camilla Hall (Gabi), Soltysik's lover, killed in LAPD shootout on May 17, 1974.
- Emily Harris (Yolanda), was convicted of the Hearst kidnapping and bank robbery murder. She was paroled in February 2007.
- William Harris (General Teko), Emily Harris's husband and self-proclaimed leader of the SLA following DeFreeze's death, was convicted and imprisoned for the Hearst kidnapping and California bank murder. He was paroled in September 2006. The Harrises divorced. On September 10, 2026, Harris died of a heart attack at the age of 81.

=== Later members (after the Hearst kidnapping) ===
- Patty Hearst (Tania), kidnapped and became a member of SLA. Arrested in 1975 and imprisoned for robbery, released in 1979, pardoned in 2001.
- Kathleen Ann Soliah (alias Sara Jane Olson), a friend of Atwood. Soliah became more involved after her friend Atwood's death in the LAPD 1974 shootout. After being arrested in 1999 following decades as a fugitive, she pleaded guilty of charges related to her role in placing explosives intended for bombing the LAPD, and the California bank robbery and murder. She served seven years of a 14-year sentence before gaining parole in 2009.
- Jim (James) Kilgore, Kathleen Soliah's boyfriend during the SLA period. As a fugitive, he escaped to South Africa, where he made a new life for years. He is now a research scholar at the Center for African Studies at the University of Illinois.
- Steven Soliah, brother to Kathleen Soliah.
- Michael Bortin, married to Josephine Soliah, sister to Kathleen Soliah.
- Wendy Yoshimura, former member with her friend Willie Brandt of the Revolutionary Army, a violent activist group. She was convicted and imprisoned for the California bank robbery and murder with the SLA, and was later paroled.

=== Associates and sympathizers ===
- Josephine Soliah, Kathleen Soliah's sister
- Bonnie Jean Wilder, Seanna, Sally (a friend of Remiro's), and Bridget. Hearst identifies each of them in her book Every Secret Thing (1982) as potential members of the SLA.
- Micki and Jack Scott, a writer and sports activist. While not an SLA member, he aided them as fugitives in the hope of writing a book with them about the Hearst kidnapping and other activities. Jack Scott participated in transporting the Harrises and Hearst, then fugitive SLA members, to different parts of the US, including his farmhouse in Pennsylvania. He volunteered to shelter them in hopes of writing a book on them with their cooperation. Scott, sports editor for the radical magazine Ramparts, died in 2000.

== Cultural impact ==
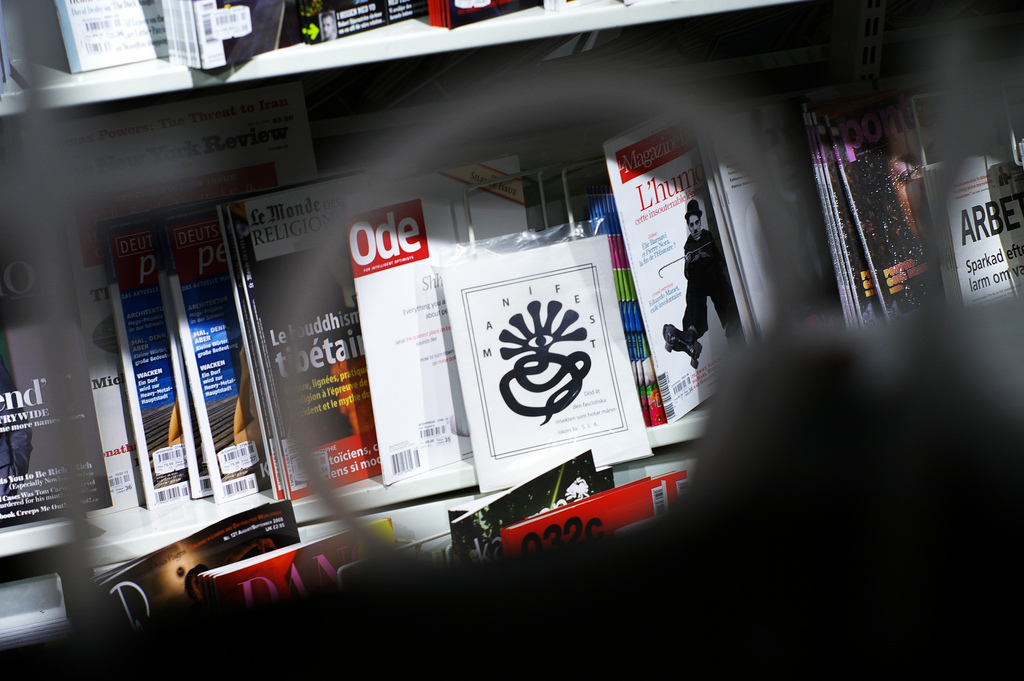
The SLA manifesto for sale in a magazine store in Stockholm in August 2008.

The SLA distributed photographs, news releases and radio-quality taped interviews in which they explained their activities to the press. The Bay Area Research Collective was formed as an above-ground support group for the SLA, and distributed a mimeographed newsletter, The Dragon.
