= Ed Lin =

American novelist

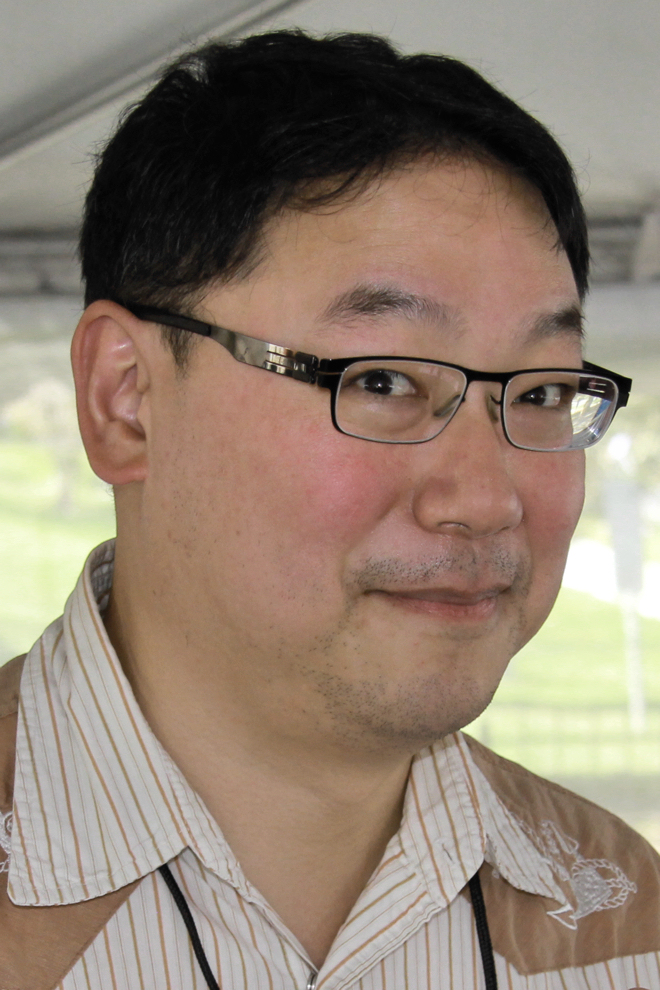
- Lin at the 2014 Texas Book Festival
- Education: Columbia University (BS)
- Occupations: Novelist; writer; actor
- Spouse: Cindy Cheung (m. 2002)
- Children: 1
- Website: http://www.edlinforpresident.com

Ed Lin is a Taiwanese-American writer and novelist. He is the first author to win three Asian American Literary Awards. His first novel, Waylaid (2002) won a Members' Choice Award at the Asian American Literary Awards and also a Booklist Editors' Choice Award in Fiction in 2002. Lin has written a series of crime novels revolving around Chinese-American cop Robert Chow and set in 1976 New York City Chinatown, beginning with This Is A Bust (2007) (Kaya Press), which won a Members' Choice Award at the Asian American Literary Awards. The sequel, Snakes Can't Run, was published in 2010, followed with One Red Bastard in 2012, both by Minotaur Books.

== Biography ==
Lin was born and raised in New York City to a Taiwanese American family. He graduated from Columbia University with a Bachelor of Science degree in mining engineering around 1991, and was one class short of graduating with a Bachelor of Arts degree in Literature writing, which he wanted to obtain in order to go to Journalism school, an aspiration of his.

In 2002, Lin married Cindy Cheung, an actress. They have one son and reside in Brooklyn.

== Novels ==
Waylaid (2002), Lin's first novel is described as the story of a Taiwanese/Chinese American boy “struggling to grow up amidst the drudgery and sexual innuendo of his parents' sleazy motel on the Jersey Shore" and was a 2002 Booklist Editors' Choice in Fiction and also won a Members' Choice Award at the Asian American Literary Awards. The film adaptation directed by Michael Kang was titled The Motel and won the Humanitas Prize at the Sundance Film Festival, along with being nominated for a Best First Feature Independent Spirit Award.

His trilogy of crime novels featuring Chinese-American police detective Robert Chow set in 1970s Chinatown has also won awards and garnered praise. The series comprises This Is A Bust (2007), which garnered the 2008 Asian American Literary Awards Members Choice Award, a Booklist Starred Review, and was listed in both Best American Last Sentences of Books of 2007 and The Best American Nonrequired Reading 2008 (edited by Dave Eggers). The subsequent books in the series Snakes Can't Run (2010) and One Red Bastard (2012) both earned a Publishers Weekly Starred Review.

In 2014, Lin published Ghost Month, the first novel in his Night Market crime series set in Taipei, Taiwan. It revolves around young protagonist Jing-nan, a cynical, Joy Division-obsessed UCLA dropout forced to return to Taipei to run his family's night market food stall in order to pay his late grandfather's old gambling debts. When he hears about the murder of a betel nut girl and finds out she happens to be his former girlfriend, he begins to investigate.

In 2016, Lin released the sequel, also starring the character of Jing-nan entitled Incensed, in which he gets summoned by his uncle, a ruthless gangster, and given an order he can't refuse: to watch over the gangster's rebellious 16-year-old daughter.

The third book in the series, 99 Ways to Die, was released in 2018 by Soho Crime, publisher of the previous Taipei Night Market novels.

In 2020, Lin wrote, published and released his first young adult novel, David Tung Can't Have a Girlfriend Unless He Gets into an Ivy League College (Kaya Press).

=== Short stories and serialized fiction ===
He also writes a serialized fiction series, or novel in installments, "Motherfuckerland" for Giant Robot Magazine. He also has published various short stories including "Dave" and "Chinese New Year" (published in The Asian American Literary Review) as well as "Man Vs." (published in Animal Farm) about the show Man v. Food.

== Film appearances ==
As an actor, Lin played the title character in Derek Nguyen's film The Potential Wives of Norman Mao, which screened at a variety of film festivals including the Los Angeles Asian Pacific Film Festival, the Hawaii International Film Festival, the NYC Asian American International Film Festival, The LA Shorts Fest, The Raindance Film Festival in London and the Cannes Film Festival Short Film Corner. He also starred alongside his wife Cindy Cheung in a music video for Magnetic North and Taiyo Na's "Home:Word" directed by Wong Fu Productions.

== Gaming ==
Lin wrote the story for AR geo-based detective game, Unforgivable: Eliza (Chinese: 鎮山).

== Bibliography ==
=== Standalone ===
- Waylaid (2002)

=== Robert Chow series ===
- This Is A Bust (2007)
- Snakes Can't Run (2010)
- One Red Bastard (2012)

=== Taipei Night Market series ===
- Ghost Month (2014)
- Incensed (2016)
- 99 Ways to Die (2018)
- Death Doesn't Forget (2022)

=== Young Adult fiction ===
- David Tung Can't Have a Girlfriend Until He Gets Into an Ivy League College (2020)
