= Rajiv Satyal =

American comedian (born 1976)

Rajiv Kumar Satyal
- Born: 1976 (age 49–50); Hamilton, Ohio, U.S.
- Notable work: No Man's Land; Rajiv... Left to His Own Devices; Indian Invasion
- Children: 1

Comedy career
- Years active: 2002–present
- Medium: Stand-up, television, film, radio, web
- Genres: Observational comedy, Improvisational comedy, Wit, Satire, Puns, Monologue, Corporate Comedy, Clean Comedy
- Subjects: Dating, Relationships, Politics, Race, Indian Culture, Office, College, Technology
- Website: RajivSatyal.com

Rajiv Satyal (born 1976) is an American comedian. He is the first person to perform standup comedy on all seven continents.

== Early life ==
Rajiv Satyal was born in Hamilton, Ohio to Indian parents. He graduated from Fairfield High School in 1994. Satyal earned a Bachelor of Science degree in materials engineering from the University of Cincinnati in 2000. During college, he interned on Capitol Hill in Washington, DC, for Rep. Steve Chabot (R-OH). Satyal did two co-op terms at Wright Patterson Air Force Base in Dayton, Ohio.

== Career ==
=== Procter & Gamble ===
Satyal worked at Procter & Gamble from 2000 to 2006. He started in purchasing at P&G but switched to marketing in 2004. Satyal began but did not finish an MBA at Xavier University in Cincinnati. He gained admission to New York University Stern School of Business after fewer than three years of full-time work but did not attend. Satyal co-led branded entertainment strategy for all brands in North America for Procter & Gamble, the world’s largest advertiser. While at P&G, Satyal created content for Home Made Simple, a site visited by 15 million people per month. He was named P&G’s Funniest Employee in 2005. Satyal performed stand-up routines at corporate events. Satyal left P&G and moved to Los Angeles in 2006 at the age of 30. He was the brand manager of FIJI Water for 12 weeks. He is the third comedian to come out of the Cincinnati offices of Procter & Gamble.

=== Comedy ===
Satyal started doing standup comedy in 2002 at Go Bananas Comedy Club in Montgomery, Ohio. He was a UC College of Engineering student when he started. His brother, Rakesh Satyal, saw an article about the Funniest Person in Cincinnati contest and encouraged him to enter. Rajiv had some material written for a book he was thinking about, but instead, used it at his tryout. He made it to the semifinals his first time around in 1998. The next year, he won. For the next three years, Satyal teetered on whether he wanted to do comedy. He would do a few shows one weekend, then shy away from it the next. He became serious about comedy in 2002.

In 2005, Satyal entered the Funniest Person in Cincinnati contest, this time in the semi-pro/professional division, and won. Satyal has worked with Dave Chappelle, Kevin James, Tim Allen, Kevin Nealon and Russell Peters. By April 2008, Satyal had opened for Peters over 15 times. Satyal and Nealon met in 2005 at the Cincinnati Funny Bone and saw Batman Begins together and had dinner. Since Satyal moved to Los Angeles, Nealon has asked Satyal to open for him often.

Along with fellow comedian Azhar Usman, he co-founded "Make Chai, Not War" in 2012, which was sponsored by the U.S. State Department. The tour visited seven cities in India. The tour was covered by NPR on their program All Things Considered, as well as being recognized on Capitol Hill. Sen. Rand Paul (R-KY) grilled U.S. Secretary of State Hillary Clinton about it. "I can understand that maybe you're not aware that your department spent $100,000 on three comedians who went to India on a promotional tour called ‘Make Chai, Not War’."”

Satyal was hired by Velvet Suite Marketing to speak to NFL players about personal branding. He spoke to the Green Bay Packers, Miami Dolphins and Buffalo Bills.

Satyal puts together comedy shows for corporate innovation sessions. He runs a consulting business called Standpoint Agency, an agency that helps marketers generate insights for their businesses. Brands such as Dannon, P&G's Herbal Essences and Gillette have signed up.

He hosts a podcast entitled, The TanGent Show, formerly known as The Funny Indian Show. He has interviewed Deepak Chopra, Kevin Nealon, Seth Godin, Russell Peters, Kumail Nanjiani and others.

He has been blogging on his website since 2002. Satyal has over 50 million views on YouTube. He has stated that his career goal is to host the Oscars.

Satyal developed a 90-minute one-person show, No Man's Land, which sold out shows in Los Angeles, New York, San Francisco and Cincinnati.

Satyal named University of Cincinnati's radio-station-turned-media group "BearCast".

== Comedic style ==
Satyal's TV-clean act resonates with Middle America. Satyal did not do any ethnic humor at all during his first few years.

It was Pete Sampras, then the World No. 1 men's tennis player, who told Satyal to start doing Indian jokes. Satyal has described his performance style as alternatingly self-aggrandizing and self-deprecating. "I feel like growing up in Ohio, it made me kind of more of an everyman being able to relate to people in the heartland of the country. I think people on the coast have their own sensibility, but it's hard to know what works inland. A lot of comedians are like hurricanes; they knock it out on the coast, but when they come inland they die." The actress Eva Longoria once told Satyal she thought he was "hilarious".

Satyal opened for the Indian prime minister Narendra Modi in front of 17,000 people in San Jose, California.

== Personal life ==
Satyal's mother migrated to the US in 1970 and his father in 1971 from India. They are naturalized citizens. He has two brothers who are fraternal twins - Vikas and Rakesh. Rakesh Satyal is the author of Blue Boy. Satyal is friends with the SNL and Weeds star Kevin Nealon. Satyal's favorite book is The Catcher in the Rye. He is a Hindu of Indian Punjabi descent.

Satyal proposed to Harsha Mistry, a Texas pharmacist, onstage at The Funny Bone in Newport, Kentucky, as he was opening for the former Saturday Night Live star Kevin Nealon. Satyal and Mistry were married in Austin, Texas, in July 2015. Several of Satyal's friends from the comedy world were in attendance, including the actor Ed Weeks from The Mindy Project and Russell Peters, who did a set, and even took over the turntables to DJ. Satyal joked during his wedding speech, "I finally got him to open for me."

== Works ==
=== Discography ===
Year	Title
2014	No Man's Land
2013	Rajiv... Left to His Own Devices
2007	Indian Invasion Comedy

=== Filmography ===
Film

Year	Title	Role	Notes
2007	Indian Invasion Comedy	Lead	

Television

Year	Title	Role	Notes
2007	Bollywood Fashion Awards	Host	
2007	Asian Variety Show	Host	
2008	Bill Bellamy's Who's Got Jokes?	Comedian	
2008	Desi States of America	Host	
2010	Last Comic Standing	Co-star	
2012	Actors Entertainment	Guest	
2013	Big Time Rush		

Web

Year	Title	Role	Notes
2008	Customer Service Sucks	Customer Service Rep, Lead	
2013	Top Guys	Lead	2 episodes
2013	Instacurity	Therapist Dr. Jeeves	

Radio

Year	Title	Role	Notes
2014	The Bob & Tom Show	Guest	

=== Comedy bits ===
Year	Title
2011	Fahim Anwar
2011	Neelu Sodhii
2011	Comedian KT Tatara part I of II
2011	Fahim Anwar part II
2011	Hasan Minhaj
2011	Hasan Minhaj part II
2024	Dumbest Thing I ever Heard
2024	Let Me Be Clear
2024	Bachelorhood
2024	All Over The Place
2024	Born Outside London

== Awards and recognitions ==
- Russell Peters called Satyal "one of two Indian Americans to watch".
- Satyal has generated a fair amount of press, being featured on/in NPR, The Wall Street Journal, The Washington Post, Advertising Age, The Huffington Post, India Abroad, The Cincinnati Enquirer and the Los Angeles Times. He won The Funniest Person in Cincinnati Contest in 2005.
- In 2008, Satyal was #35 on the Top 50 Coolest Desis in the world.
- Satyal has the distinction of opening Dave Chappelle's first show after he returned from Africa in 2005.
