= Rahul Mehta =

American author

- Born: West Virginia, U.S.
- Occupation: Novelist

Rahul Mehta is an American author. They were born and raised in West Virginia, and their work focuses on the experience of being queer and South Asian. Mehta is the winner of the Lambda Literary Award for Debut Gay Fiction and the Asian American Literary Award for Fiction for their short story collection Quarantine (2011). They teach Creative Writing at the University of the Arts.

== Bibliography ==
- No Other World: A Novel, Harper, 2017
- Quarantine: Stories, HarperPerrenial, 2011

== Recognition ==
Mehta's work has been reviewed in many publications, including the Iowa Review, Fiction Writers Review, Lambda Literary Review, Time Out, and Booklist. Brian Leung said of Mehta's short story collection, "Quarantine marks a turning of a corner, a representative flashpoint, at least, for LGBT and Asian-American writers who have felt obligated to center their creative work around savory dishes, coming out, the exotic customs of intervening relatives, protest, all the expected signifiers." Leung concludes, "Mehta's stories acknowledge that we can occupy more than one subject position." V. Jo Hsu writes that Mehta "artfully interweaves sexual and racial tensions without creating an antagonistic ‘other.’"

== Awards ==
- Out Magazine Out 100, 2011
- Lamba Literary Award for Gay Debut Fiction, 2012
- Asian American Literary Award for Fiction, 2012
- American Library Association, Over The Rainbow Citation
