= Susan Choi =

American novelist (born 1969)

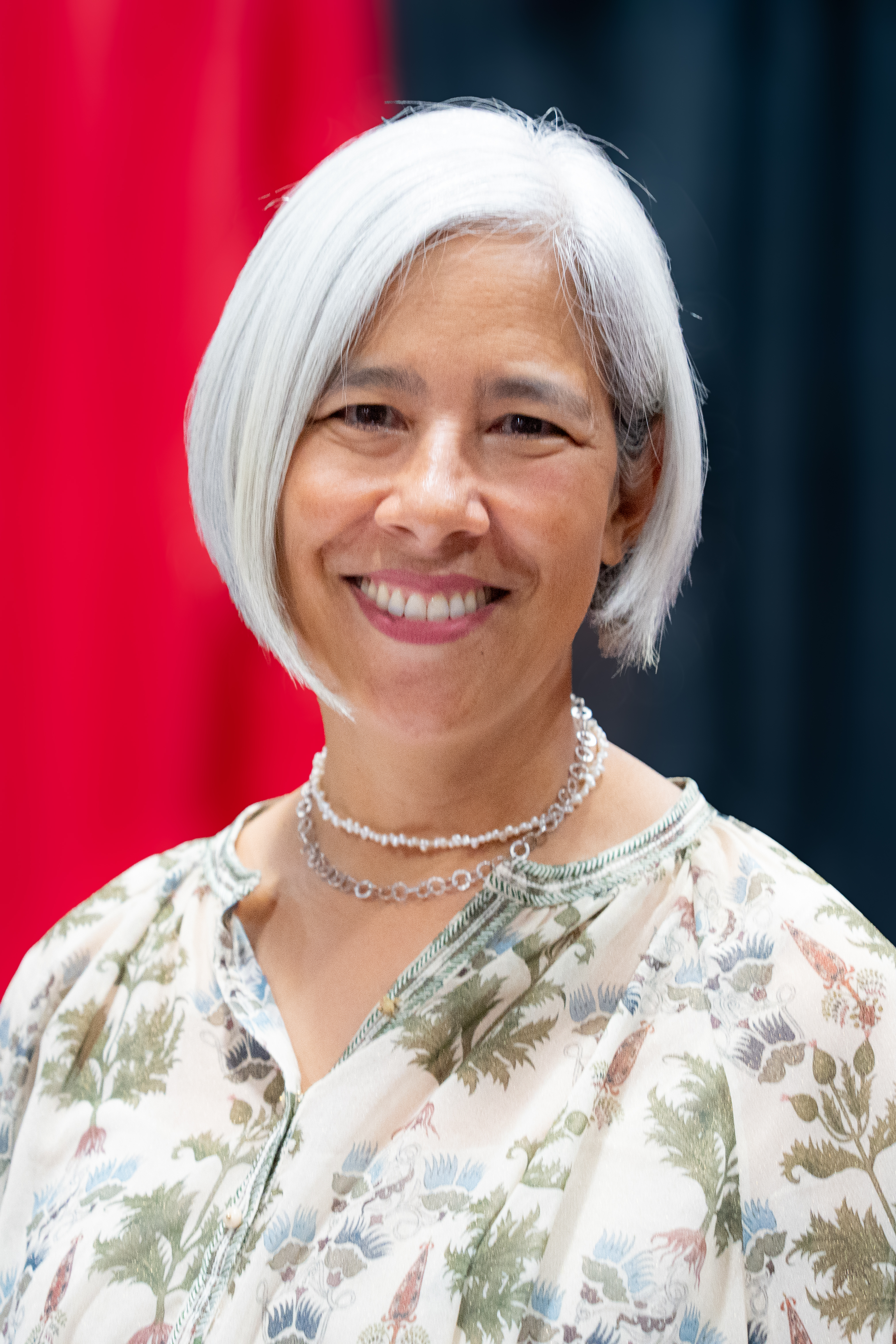
- Choi at the National Book Festival 2025
- Born: January 28, 1969 (age 57); South Bend, Indiana, U.S.
- Education: Yale University (BA); Cornell University (MFA)
- Occupation: Novelist
- Writing career
- Genre: Fiction
- Notable works: The Foreign Student (1998); A Person of Interest (2008); My Education (2013); Trust Exercise (2019); Flashlight (2025)
- Website: susanchoi.com

Susan Malka Choi (born January 28, 1969) is an American novelist. She is the author of several acclaimed novels, including The Foreign Student (1998), American Woman (2003), and Trust Exercise (2019), which won the National Book Award for Fiction. She was shortlisted for the 2025 Booker Prize, for her most recent novel Flashlight.

== Early life and education ==
Born in 1969 in South Bend, Indiana, United States, to a Korean father and an American Jewish mother, Choi attended public schools. When she was nine years old, her parents divorced. She and her mother moved to Houston, Texas, where she attended the High School for the Performing and Visual Arts. Choi earned a B.A. degree in Literature from Yale University (1990) and an M.F.A. from Cornell University.

== Career ==
Choi at the 2019 National Book Festival

After receiving her graduate degree, she worked for The New Yorker as a fact checker. At this job she met her husband, Pete Wells. They separated in 2016 but continue to share a house in Brooklyn and co-parent their two sons.

Choi published her first novel, The Foreign Student, in 1998. It won the Asian American Literary Award for Fiction and was a finalist for the Barnes & Noble Discover Great New Writers Award. In 2000, she edited (with David Remnick) Wonderful Town: New York Stories from The New Yorker, an anthology of short fiction.

Her second novel, American Woman (2003), was a finalist for the Pulitzer Prize in literature. In 2010, she won the PEN/W.G. Sebald Award for A Person of Interest, which was also a finalist for the PEN/Faulkner Award in 2009.

In 2014, her fourth novel, My Education, won the Lambda Literary Award for Bisexual Fiction.

As of May 2018, Choi was working on a novel employing conventions of memoir and reportage that "takes up the question of national identity, and the extent to which it coincides or does not coincide with ethnic and with cultural identity." In 2019, she published her fifth novel, Trust Exercise, which won the National Book Award for Fiction.

In 2025, Choi published her sixth novel, Flashlight. It was longlisted for the 2025 Booker Prize. In September 2025, Flashlight was selected for the shortlist. The novel was also longlisted for the 2025 National Book Award for Fiction.

Choi teaches creative writing at the Johns Hopkins Writing Seminars.

== Awards and grants ==
- Asian American Literary Award for Fiction for The Foreign Student
- Steven Turner Award for The Foreign Student
- National Endowment for the Arts Fellowship recipient (2001)
- Guggenheim Fellow (2004).
- PEN/W.G. Sebald Award (2010) for A Person of Interest
- Lambda Literary Award for Bisexual Fiction for My Education (2014)
- National Book Award for Fiction for Trust Exercise (2019)
- Sunday Times Short Story Award (2021) for Flashlight

== Bibliography ==
=== Novels ===
- The Foreign Student (1998), ISBN 0-06-019149-X
- American Woman (2003), ISBN 0-06-054221-7
- A Person of Interest (2008), ISBN 978-0-670-01846-8
- My Education (2013), ISBN 0670024902
- Trust Exercise (2019), ISBN 9781250222022
- Flashlight (2025), ISBN 9780374616373

=== Children's books ===
- Camp Tiger (picture book, illustrated by John Rocco) (2019), ISBN 9780399173295

=== Short fiction ===
Anthologies (edited)

- Wonderful Town: New York Stories from The New Yorker (2000), ISBN 0-375-50356-0 (ed. with David Remnick)

Stories

Title	Year	First published	Reprinted/collected	Notes
"Flashlight"	2020	Choi, Susan (September 7, 2020). "Flashlight". The New Yorker. Vol. 96, no. 26. pp. 60–66.		
"The Whale Mother"	2020	Choi, Susan (January 2020). "The Whale Mother". Harper's Magazine.		
