= Patty Hearst (film) =

1988 film by Paul Schrader

- Theatrical release poster
- Directed by: Paul Schrader
- Screenplay by: Nicholas Kazan
- Based on: Every Secret Thing by: Patty Hearst; with Alvin Moscow
- Produced by: Marvin Worth
- Starring: Natasha Richardson; William Forsythe; Ving Rhames; Frances Fisher; Jodi Long
- Cinematography: Bojan Bazelli
- Edited by: Michael R. Miller
- Music by: Scott Johnson
- Distributed by: Atlantic Releasing
- Release dates: May 13, 1988 (Cannes); September 23, 1988 (U.S.)
- Running time: 108 minutes
- Country: United States
- Language: English
- Budget: $4 million
- Box office: $1.2 million

Patty Hearst is a 1988 American biographical crime drama film directed by Paul Schrader. The film stars Natasha Richardson as Hearst Corporation heiress Patricia Hearst and Ving Rhames as Symbionese Liberation Army (SLA) leader Cinque. The film depicts Hearst's kidnapping, her transformation into an active follower of the SLA after a long-lasting imprisonment and process of purported brainwashing, and her final arrest after a series of armed robberies. It is based on Hearst's 1982 autobiography Every Secret Thing (co-written with Alvin Moscow), which was later rereleased as Patty Hearst – Her Own Story.

== Plot ==
Members of the Symbionese Liberation Army kidnap publishing magnate heiress Patty Hearst from her Berkeley apartment and take her to their safe house, where she is kept blindfolded in a closet. Her captivity is interrupted by brief lessons in the SLA's teachings and, eventually, offers of sex. She is told by the group's leader, "General Field Marshall" Cinque, that she is being used for bargaining for the release of two captive comrades, an offer eventually refused by the state. In its place, the SLA devise a program for the Hearsts to donate $70 to every poor Californian.

As negotiations begin to break down in this recent attempt, Cinque informs Patty that the War Council has to decide what to do with her. As she is slowly ingratiated in the group, she is given the choice to join or go home, though the latter option is reinforced with a bottle tapping on her leg, a reminder to "join or die".

After undergoing a series of tests, Patty is brought into the SLA as a member and given the name Tania. She poses for pictures with the group and records lines to give to the media while undergoing military drills. The group plans a bank robbery and pick the Hibernia Bank as the site. Though the robbery is successful, Patty is unable to recite her prepared speech.

The group acquires a vehicle from a family of Black Muslim neighbors and move to Los Angeles. While out with Teko and Yolanda, Teko is nearly arrested for stealing and Patty shoots at the police to enable their escape. Hiding out at a motel, the group learn that the SLA's main safe house has been raided and watch the subsequent shootout on television, in which all the members besides themselves are killed.

The trio move to Pennsylvania to stay at the home of SLA member Wendy, who is somewhat disillusioned with the cause following the arrest of a comrade. They meet up with an SLA chapter in San Francisco and continue performing bank robberies and bombing police cars. Teko and Yolanda split from the group in search of a black leader and the apartment is later raided by the FBI, leading to Patty and Wendy's arrest.

Patty's attorney has psychiatrists subject her to a range of probing questions about her captivity. Yolanda, situated in a cell adjacent to Patty's, tells her that they should have killed her a long time ago. In the subsequent trial, Patty is cross-examined and she is found guilty on the charges of bank robbery and using a firearm during the commission of a felony.

Later, Patty is visited by her father in prison, where she tells him of her plan to get her conviction commuted, with hope of a presidential pardon in future. She bitterly muses that, in the eyes of the public, the crime she was truly guilty of was surviving her ordeal.

== Cast ==
- Natasha Richardson as Patricia Hearst
- William Forsythe as William "Teko" Harris
- Ving Rhames as Donald "Cinque Mtume" DeFreeze
- Frances Fisher as Emily "Yolanda" Harris
- Jodi Long as Wendy Yoshimura
- Olivia Barash as Nancy "Fahizah" Ling Perry
- Dana Delany as Angela "Gelina" Atwood
- Marek Johnson as Patricia "Zoya" Soltysik
- Kitty Swink as Camilla "Gabi" Hall
- Peter Kowanko as Willie "Cujo" Wolfe (as Pete Kowanko)
- Tom O'Rourke as Jim Browning
- Scott Kraft as Steven Weed
- Jeff Imada as neighbor (Steven Suenaga)
- Ermal Williamson as Randolph A. Hearst
- Elaine Revard as Catherine Hearst
- Destiny Reyes Allstun as Vicky Hearst

== Production ==
=== Development ===
The screenplay was written by Nicholas Kazan (son of Oscar-winning director Elia Kazan), drawing narration from Hearst's memoir. The film was originally optioned by producer Marvin Worth to be produced by 20th Century-Fox, but the project was late sold to Atlantic Entertainment Group. Directors Hal Ashby and Bob Rafelson were considered to direct the project, but Paul Schrader was hired after expressing great enthusiasm over Kazan's screenplay.

The film was produced on a budget of approximately $4 million.

=== Filming ===
Principal photography took place largely in southern California in Santa Monica, San Pedro, and Anaheim. Additional photography took place in northern California in Daly City and on the University of California, Berkeley campus near Sather Gate. The bank robbery scene was staged at the Hibernia Bank Building in San Francisco.

== Release ==
Patty Hearst premiered at the 1988 Cannes Film Festival on May 13 in the feature film competition.

=== Home media ===
The MGM Limited Edition Collection released Patty Hearst on DVD in 2011. Vinegar Syndrome released a limited edition Blu-ray disc of the film on June 30, 2020.

== Reception ==
=== Box office ===
The film opened on September 23, 1988, in the United States and grossed $601,680 in its opening weekend. The film was a box-office bomb, grossing a total of $1,223,326 against its $4 million budget.

=== Critical response ===
The film garnered generally positive reviews, with Richardson's performance praised in particular. On the review aggregator website Rotten Tomatoes, 60% of 15 critics' reviews are positive. Metacritic, which uses a weighted average, assigned the film a score of 62 out of 100, based on 14 critics, indicating "generally favorable" reviews.

Upon the film's premiere at the Cannes Film Festival, European critics were "offended" by what was perceived as a comical portrayal of the SLA, and criticized Schrader's apparent "scorn for the revolution in general." Vincent Canby, reviewing the film for The New York Times, wrote that "Patty Hearst is a beautifully produced movie, seen entirely from Patty's limited point of view. It is stylized at times, utterly direct and both shocking and grimly funny." Roger Ebert writing for the Chicago Sun-Times praised Richardson's performance: "The entire film centers on the remarkable performance by Natasha Richardson as Hearst," but concluded that "This whole story seemed so much more exciting from the outside."

Pauline Kael called the film "a lean, impressive piece of work" and even suggested that it answered the longstanding mystery about Hearst: "Did Patty Hearst become part of the S.L.A. willingly, out of conviction, or was she simply trying to save her life? The movie shows you that, in the state she was in, there was no difference. Natasha Richardson, who plays Patty, has been handed a big unwritten role; she feels her way into it, and she fills it. We feel how alone and paralyzed Patty is — she retreats to being a hidden observer. Patty is a girl who is raped in mind and body, and no longer knows when it started."

== Sources ==
- Kouvaros, George (2008). Paul Schrader. Urbana, Illinois: University of Illinois. ISBN 978-0-252-07508-7.
