= Colston Westbrook =

American teacher and linguist (1937–1989)

- Born: Colston Richard Westbrook; September 14, 1937; Chambersburg, Pennsylvania
- Died: August 3, 1989 (aged 51); Oakland, California
- Education: Contra Costa College

Colston Richard Westbrook (September 14, 1937 – August 3, 1989) was an American teacher and linguist who worked in the fields of minority education and literacy. At the University of California, Berkeley, he established a program of prison outreach and approved students from the Bay Area to serve as volunteers. Some of the participants from Berkeley and two former prisoners at Vacaville Prison were among the founding members in 1973 of the radical leftist group known as the Symbionese Liberation Army.

Westbrook had previously served with a contractor in Vietnam for the US Army that provided services to the CIA. After returning to the United States, he worked for the Los Angeles Police Department in its Criminal Conspiracy Section and the State of California's Criminal Identification and Investigation Unit. In 1970 he started graduate work at University of California, Berkeley and taught at the university after completing it.

== Early life ==
Westbrook was born on September 14, 1937, in Chambersburg, Pennsylvania, where he was raised. He also grew up in this area. His father was Edward Cody Westbrook, who died in Germany while serving as a sergeant in the Army in World War II. His mother, Virginia Ruth (Colston) Westbrook, was first a housewife and then held various jobs while raising their five children. She stressed their education. His siblings were Cody, Naomi (married name Martinez), and Diane and Tanya Hill.

Westbrook attended Chambersburg primary and high schools, graduating with honors in 1955. After graduation he and his elder brother, Cody, traveled from Pennsylvania to Richmond, California to live with their maternal grandmother. Colston attended Contra Costa College, in San Pablo where he excelled, particularly at languages. He was an honors student. He was selected to travel to Rome, Italy to represent Contra Costa College under President Dwight D. Eisenhower's People to People Student Ambassador Program.

== Military and government contracting career ==
In an unusual path, Westbrook served in the Army, followed by the Air Force. After an assignment in South Korea, he was assigned in 1960 to Travis Air Force Base in California. Upon completion of military service in 1967, he taught English at the International Christian University in Tokyo. During that period he became friends with Steven Mbandi and later visited him in his home country of Cameroon.

While in Tokyo he was recruited for a civilian position in South Vietnam with Pacific Architects and Engineers, a US government contractor for the Central Intelligence Agency's Phoenix Program. He worked with PAE for five years there, as the United States became increasingly embroiled in warfare, in an effort to prevent South Vietnam from being overtaken by communists.

When a journalist asked Westbrook in 1974 why he had gone to Vietnam, he answered, "Money, why else? I was told by the American Embassy in Tokyo I could make $10,000 working in Vietnam. They said it pays to be black in Nam". PAE's services as a contractor included civilian cover for CIA operatives and constructing 44 Province Detention Centers. Westbrook later denied working for the CIA.

In 1968, Westbrook returned to the United States, where he began working with the Los Angeles Police Department's Criminal Conspiracy Section and the State of California's Criminal Identification and Investigation Unit. During that time radical black militant organizations were a top target of those units. According to writer Ward Churchill, circumstantial evidence suggests that Westbrook could have begun a working relationship at the time with Donald DeFreeze, an alleged informant for LAPD.

Years later Westbrook had contact with DeFreeze when the latter was in prison at the California Medical Facility in Vacaville. By then working as a teaching assistant and later professor at University of California, Berkeley, Westbrook had set up a program of prisoner outreach for student volunteers. They worked with members of the Black Cultural Association, an organization of black prisoners, to participate in discussion groups on politics and social justice, and assist in education. Westbrook organized student volunteers to work with prisoners, who included DeFreeze.

== Academic career ==
Westbrook enrolled in the Linguistics department at the University of California, Berkeley in September 1970. By this time, he had mastered several foreign languages — Korean, Japanese, Italian, German, and French. He also studied Swahili at Berkeley with Bwana Kaaya, from Tanzania. He understood and had a working knowledge of Bakweri.

He worked in the fields of minority education and literacy. While a student, he won a Fulbright Scholarship to study at the Sorbonne in Paris. In 1975, he completed his master's thesis on the dual linguistic heritage of African Americans, which he called "Black English dialectology." He focused on how many African-American students customarily code-switched between the General American dialect and their own dialect of English, which has some roots in West African languages. He told a journalist, "It's a brand new field, my own field. I made it up". As a teaching assistant, he taught African-American Linguistics in Berkeley's Department of Afro-American Studies. He continued to teach the class after completing his doctoral degree.

He established his own educational consulting company, Minority Consultants, located on San Pablo Avenue in Berkeley. It assisted African immigrants and African Americans with resources, to educate mainstream society about how African Americans learn, and to assist immigrants in adjusting to American society.

He served as dean of students at Contra Costa College in San Pablo, California from 1978 until 1989.

== Student activism and prison outreach ==
The Black Cultural Association was formed in 1968 at the California Medical Facility in Vacaville and became officially recognized by the prison system in 1971. At that time Westbrook was a graduate student at Berkeley and became the group's "outside visitors coordinator" for educational outreach from students at Bay Area colleges and universities. He reportedly was asked to work with this group (but it is unclear who asked). There were cultural meetings at the prison on Friday nights, which several hundred outsiders also attended. They opened with a pan African flag and black power salutes. Meeting programs included speeches, poetry readings, plays and debates. The program attracted radical students who saw militant black nationalism as a force that could launch a revolution. Westbrook's purported prior relationship with inmate Donald DeFreeze in Los Angeles has driven the contention that DeFreeze was recruited by Westbrook as an informant to keep tabs on black inmates with radical political sympathies, and on interactions with radical students in the outreach program.

Willie Wolfe, Russell Little and Mary Alice Siem, white students who attended Westbrook's African-American Linguistics class, were among those from Berkeley who joined the BCA outreach program. In 1972, DeFreeze invited these three to join his separate study group, Unisight. Another inmate, Thero Wheeler, a former Black Panther, was also in this group.

These individuals were among the founding members in 1973 of the Symbionese Liberation Army following DeFreeze's escape from Soledad prison, where he had been transferred. Wheeler later escaped from Vacaville and joined his associates in Berkeley.

Westbrook was involved in student politics on campus. He was President of the Pan African Student Union at UC Berkeley for two consecutive terms. In 1979, he hosted a question-answer session with noted author James Baldwin on campus. His views on equity and justice often created controversy.

== Symbionese Liberation Army ==
Questions about Westbrook's relationship to the Symbionese Liberation Army arise from his relationships with its key players, including DeFreeze and student participants in the BCA educational outreach project. DeFreeze had received favorable treatment while at Vacaville and Soledad prisons, which followed court approval of lenient probation and lack of prosecution earlier on weapons charges while in Los Angeles. Some reporters have suggested that DeFreeze's escape was arranged by law enforcement in an effort to launch intelligence-gathering and sting operations against Bay Area radicals.

After his escape, when DeFreeze met radicals in the Bay area, he was known for his eagerness to sell firearms, explosives, and related items. Some writers have raised suspicions that he was trying to set up sting operations. His means of acquiring weaponry has remained unexplained (it was theorized that the weapons cache was provided by law enforcement handlers). Westbrook may not have supervised or foreseen the role of his BCA/educational outreach contacts' in founding a radical group. But he may have had a role facilitating undercover operations with DeFreeze, in line with his purported earlier role facilitating LAPD undercover operations against black radicals.

After kidnapping Patty Hearst in February 1974, the SLA placed Westbrook on their death list by April. They claimed he was a CIA agent, and had worked as a "torturer" for the CIA in Vietnam. They classified him as "an enemy to be shot on sight". They also claimed he was an FBI informer.

Westbrook soon went into hiding, in fear for his life. Westbrook contended that he had fallen on the bad side of the SLA's founders because "lesbians" among them objected to his approval of miniskirt-clad black women attending BCA events, and bringing provocative images of women for BCA-affiliated inmates. Of those actions, he said, "Because if you want to dangle a carrot in front of the inmates to get 'em to learn and come to meetings, you don't dangle Communism. You dangle fine‐looking chicks they'll think maybe they can get next to."

BCA founder David Inua described DeFreeze as unintelligent, lacking leadership ability, and incapable of formulating the SLA communiques that he purportedly wrote. Inua said he thought Patricia "Mizmoon" Soltysik and Nancy Ling Perry, two gung-ho white upper middle-class radicals enthralled with violent revolution, were the driving force behind forming the SLA and the major theorizers. Both were involved in sexual relationships with DeFreeze. "Popeye" Jackson, a former inmate at Vacaville and prisoners' rights advocate also commented on the adulation of black prisoners as revolutionary fantasy objects by white female radicals. These perspectives affirm Westbrook's theory that sexual politics was more powerful than political ideology for inmates who embraced politics within the BCA, to wit: DeFreeze wanted to impress the fanatical ladies for whom he was a revolutionary fantasy object.

== Private investigation of the SLA ==
Not long after the SLA's denunciation of Westbrook, Willie Wolfe's father and another member's family contracted with private investigator Lake Headley to research the group. On May 4, 1974, Headley, along with writer Donald Freed, held a press conference in San Francisco to announce their findings.

They presented 400 pages of documentation, and detailed the following findings:

- A year before the kidnapping Patty Hearst had visited convict, Donald DeFreeze, who later became the SLA's figurehead.
- DeFreeze's arrest records and disposition of cases indicated unusually lenient treatment starting in 1967, when he informed on an accomplice who possessed nearly 200 stolen weapons. The detective on the case moved to a new unit focused on black dissidents.
- Westbrook's work with Los Angeles Police Department's CCS (Criminal Conspiracy Section) and the State of California's Sacramento-based CII (Criminal Identification and Investigation) unit was noted. During this time, DeFreeze was thought likely to have been an informant. (These conclusions were later supported by a 1988 book by Ward Churchill and Jim Vander Wall.)

On May 17, 1974, The New York Times ran an article about the relationship of DeFreeze and the Los Angeles Police Department and suggestions that he was an informant. But, this account was overshadowed by reports of the shootout with the LAPD in Los Angeles and burning of the house where DeFreeze and five other members of the SLA had holed up.

In Lake Headley's 1993 book Vegas P.I.: The Life and Times of America's Greatest Detective, co-written with William Hoffman, Headley presented evidence that DeFreeze had been a police informant and agent provocateur. Further, he said that the Black Cultural Association was used by law enforcement to monitor radicals among students and prison inmates.

Theories that the SLA was conceived of as a disguised CIA hit squad gained currency in some leftist circles. These were discussed in satirical and men's entertainment/storytelling publications.

Dick Russell suggested that inmates in California prisons were recruited with a combination of coercion and promises of favored treatment, and later withdrew their consent and faced consequences. Reportedly, DeFreeze was recruited and anointed as Field Marshall Cinque while in Soledad Prison, and was allowed to escape to do the government's bidding. Russell said that the main target of the SLA hit squad was the Black Panther Party, and that Oakland School Superintendent Marcus Foster was selected as a target by government forces because he was considered too friendly with the Black Panthers in Oakland. Joe Remiro and Russell Little were thought to compromise security after the assassination of Foster; they were the only two SLA members charged with the crimes and were sentenced to prison. Russell suggests they were to be executed by SLA recruits in prison. (Remiro is still in prison.) Further, he described the kidnapping of Patty Hearst as a decoy action to provide cover for the SLA hit squad before planned actions against the Black Panthers. Lastly, he said that the Los Angeles shootout in 1974, in which six SLA members died, was a planned elimination of the hit squad to silence them after their security had been too compromised.

== Personal life ==
Westbrook married Eposi Mary Ngomba, whom he met on a visit to Cameroon. They had four children and lived in California.

== Death ==
Westbrook died of cancer at Kaiser Oakland Medical Center on August 3, 1989. He was 51.
