= Mary Alice Siem =

Founding member of the Symbionese Liberation Army

Mary Alice Siem (born circa 1950; née Landles) was a student at the University of California, Berkeley when she became involved in 1973 with a prisoner outreach program at Vacaville Prison. She became the girlfriend of Thero Wheeler, an inmate who escaped in August 1973. He was a founding member of the Symbionese Liberation Army (SLA), an extremist group based in Oakland that was classified as terrorist by law enforcement. It was known for murders, armed robberies and the kidnapping of heiress Patty Hearst after Wheeler and Siem left the group in October 1973.

== Early life ==
Siem was the younger daughter of "wealthy realtor" Thomas Austin Landles (1917-2010) and his wife Alice (1918-2012), née Coggins, who taught music at Shasta College. Her older sister, Janet Landles Swift, wife of attorney Sam Swift, was also associated with the Black Cultural Association. Siem's parents founded a successful logging company at Redding, California, having moved there in the 1940s; they also helped found, and performed with, the Shasta Symphony Orchestra, both having music degrees from the University of Oregon. The Coggins family owned the Lamoine Lumber and Trading Company based at Dunsmuir, California. Mary Alice Siem was noted to be "a lumber and real estate heiress from Redding". She was married to psychologist Frederick Meyers Siem from 1971 to their divorce in 1973; they had a son, Jeremiah.

== Vacaville Prison and Symbionese Liberation Army ==
Siem participated in the prisoner outreach program organized for student volunteers by Berkeley professor Colston Westbrook at Vacaville Prison and other sites. At Vacaville, she met inmates Donald DeFreeze and Thero Wheeler through events of the Black Cultural Association. She became Wheeler's girlfriend and was a frequent visitor to him at the prison.

In 1973 DeFreeze was transferred to Soledad prison, from which he escaped in March 1973. He went to Oakland, seeking help from white associates from the BCA at Vacaville. Russell White put him in touch with Patricia Soltysik, and he started living at her apartment.

Wheeler escaped from Vacaville in August 1973. Siem joined him as they gathered with Soltysik (known as Mizmoon) and Nancy Ling Perry, another white upper middle-class radical. These were the founding members of the radical Symbionese Liberation Army.

Although Wheeler and another associate, Joe Remiro, taught the founding SLA members how to use weapons, he was increasingly at odds at the direction of the group. They were planning violent acts to gain attention and recruit more members.

According to Wheeler and Siem, they left the SLA in October 1973 after frequent arguments with DeFreeze and Soltysik. By early the next year, they separated. Wheeler had left the area and changed his name, and Siem returned to Redding, California. On February 18, 1974, police in Redding sought Siem as a "known acquaintance" of the two escaped convicts, DeFreeze and Wheeler. She was described in the press as a young heiress, 24 years of age.

On 4 May 1974, months after Patty Hearst had been kidnapped by the SLA and they had conducted an armed bank robbery in Southern California, an article was published in The Pittsburgh Courier quoting Siem. It carried material originally published in The San Francisco Examiner. She said that she had left the SLA due to death threats from DeFreeze:

Mary Alice Siem, 24, Redding, Calif., told authorities she and Thero Wheeler, 29, unofficially identified two months ago as a possible suspect in the Hearst kidnapping, left the terrorist organization last October because they disagreed with the SLA's violent tactics.
Miss Siem ... said she and Wheeler, who were living together, attended about 20 SLA meetings. ...
On one occasion she said she was threatened at gunpoint by DeFreeze, Miss Soltysik, and Miss Perry, but Wheeler intervened. When they left the SLA, she said she and Wheeler were robbed of $600 by the other members.
According to the Examiner, whose president and editor is Miss Hearst's father, Miss Siem told authorities that she and Wheeler left the SLA because Wheeler was opposed to the violence espoused by DeFreeze.
She said their departure took place in October, a month before the fatal shooting of Oakland Schools Superintendent Marcus Foster, for which the SLA claims responsibility, and four months before Miss Hearst was kidnapped.

== Sources ==
- Burrough, Bryan (7 April 2015). Days of Rage: America's Radical Underground, the FBI, and the Forgotten Age of Revolutionary Violence. Penguin Publishing Group. ISBN 978-0-698-17007-0.
