= Joe Remiro =

American murderer and founding member of the Symbionese Liberation Army (born 1947)

- Born: Joseph Michael Remiro; 1947 (age 78–79); San Francisco, California, U.S.
- Education: San Francisco City College (did not graduate)
- Known for: Member of the Symbionese Liberation Army (SLA)
- Criminal charges: Life imprisonment for murder and attempted murder

Joseph Michael Remiro (born 1947) is an American convicted murderer and one of the founding members of the Symbionese Liberation Army (SLA) in the early fall of 1973. It was an American leftist militant group based in the Bay Area of California. He used the pseudonym or nom de guerre "Bo" while he was a member of the group.

== Early life ==
Remiro was born in 1947 and raised in San Francisco in a lower-middle-class family of Italian and Mexican ancestry. He attended Roman Catholic schools and was raised in the faith.

He began to attend San Francisco City College, but dropped out in 1965. He enlisted in the US Army.

== Military service and Vietnam ==
Remiro was assigned to Long-range reconnaissance patrol (LRRP). He served two tours in Vietnam as a member of the 101st Airborne Division. He had training as an auto mechanic and in weaponry. He participated in search and destroy missions in Vietnam, where he became addicted to drugs.

== Return and VVAW ==
When Remiro returned from service, he joined Vietnam Veterans Against the War. He also joined the more radical organization Venceremos, which had many Chicano or Mexican-American members and was militating for civil rights for its people.

He also became involved with the Black Cultural Association, a prisoner outreach and education program for inmates at the Vacaville psychiatric prison in California. Lastly, Remiro became involved at Peking House, a Maoist collective where he became best friends with Russ Little. Through these connections he also became friendly with Willie Wolfe and Angela Atwood.

This small group became founding members of the Symbionese Liberation Army, along with Donald DeFreeze, Patricia Soltysik, Nancy Ling Perry, Thero Wheeler, Mary Alice Siem, Camilla Hall, and married couple Bill and Emily Harris. All but DeFreeze, Wheeler, and Remiro were white, and many from middle-class or upper-middle-class backgrounds. They had been radicalized at University of California, Berkeley, or by associates in northern California.

== Symbionese Liberation Army ==
In the spring of 1973 Donald DeFreeze escaped from Soledad Prison and made his way to Oakland. He sought shelter at Peking House with white contacts from the Black Cultural Association. Concerned about surveillance at their high-profile, Maoist radical commune, they moved DeFreeze to a less well-known house in Concord, which was rented by Nancy Ling Perry. Patricia Soltysik was also living there. DeFreeze, who may have been an informant setting up sting operations, offered guns, explosives, and related supplies for sale to radicals he came into contact with.

Veteran Remiro used his knowledge of weaponry to train the small group of affiliated radicals into an armed force. He trained the other members in target practice, as well as the use, maintenance and dismantling of weaponry.

During that period the group was joined by Thero Wheeler, a former Black Panther who knew DeFreeze from the BCA in Vacaville. He had escaped from prison in August 1973. The group seemed increasingly committed to armed violence and preparing for action, which Wheeler opposed.

With the internal opposition cleared out of the way after Wheeler left, the SLA prepared for its first action, the assassination of Marcus Foster, Superintendent of Oakland Public Schools. Purportedly DeFreeze urged the action to gain attention and reduce competition in the city. (SLA members later testified that DeFreeze, Perry and Soltysik were responsible for the shooting of Foster and his deputy.)

Remiro and Russell Little were arrested in January 1974 after an unrelated confrontation with police. They were convicted of charges of murder in the shootings: Foster was killed and his deputy wounded.

== Assassination of Marcus Foster ==
The SLA selected Superintendent of Oakland Schools Marcus Foster and his deputy Robert Blackburn as their first assassination targets, denouncing them as "fascist" for supporting issuance of ID cards for Oakland students to keep non-student drug dealers off of campuses. Foster's proposal was a compromise offered in response to more intrusive proposals supported by more conservative players in Oakland city and school politics. The assassination was carried out on November 6, 1973, as Foster and Blackburn left an Oakland School Board meeting. Foster was killed by five cyanide-packed bullets and Blackburn was badly wounded by a shotgun blast. Although there were no eyewitnesses who could identify the assailants, circumstantial evidence discovered in January 1974 implicated Joe Remiro and Russ Little in the murder.

The killing of Oakland's first black school superintendent outraged many people, namely people of color, and other leftists.

“Black folks have never been given enough power in this country to be No. 1 on anybody's hit list. Why Foster? Why not the head of Standard Oil of California, or Union Oil or Bank of America? By what standards do you kill one of the few black superintendents of schools in the country? You go down on East 14th Street in Oakland and explain it to the people, because the SLA hasn't bothered!” said Carolyn Craven, a black reporter with strong leftist sympathies.

Speculation circulated through leftist publications that the previously unknown group who assassinated a popular liberal figure was a right-wing false flag operation.

== Arrest ==
On January 10, 1974, Remiro and Russell Little were apprehended by police, as they were driving suspiciously in a quiet neighborhood in Concord, California, at 1:30 a.m. in a battered van. Little showed the officer a fake license and claimed he was looking for the "Devoto" home. However, Little had been staying there for several weeks with Nancy Ling Perry, who had rented the house under the assumed name. When the officer asked the passenger to identify himself, Remiro grabbed a holstered pistol. The officer took cover behind his car. When the officer peered out from cover, Remiro fired two rounds at the policeman, who fired two shots back at him. Remiro took cover and then emerged again, firing three more rounds at the officer, who again fired twice at Remiro. Although neither Remiro or the officer were hit, Little was wounded during the shootout. Remiro fled the scene as police arrested Little.

Four hours later, Remiro surrendered a block from the SLA hideout. Officers found the Walther automatic pistol that had been used in the murder of Marcus Foster. Since Little had mentioned the name Devoto, it was presumed by the SLA that it was only a matter of time before police would discover their hideout. That evening the house was doused with gasoline and sprinkled with gunpowder. Nancy Ling Perry was seen driving rapidly away.

== Detention ==
As soon as Remiro and Little were booked into Concord City Jail, an extra shift of guards was called in to surround the building. No one got in or out without being thoroughly checked. The two were transferred almost immediately to Contra Costa County Jail, where armed guards on the roof were joined by extra street patrols. New and more serious charges were filed against the pair, bringing their bail to almost $750,000 each. Not wanting to allow any chance for escape or for an assisted breakout, it was decided that Remiro and Little would be transferred to California's most secure penitentiary, San Quentin prison. This move was unprecedented, as suspects are presumed innocent until proven guilty, and only the guilty are housed in penitentiaries.

On February 17, 1974, Little and Remiro attempted to release a statement to the public with some of their grievances. This was seized by prison authorities but found its way to the media in March. They said that they were being held in isolation, "the hole" on Death Row, were not adequately fed, and other claims of harassment, intimidation and violence. They claimed that this was by direction of the FBI.

In late February 1974, Little's father, O. Jack Little, made a statement to the media and to other SLA members. He offered to take Patty Hearst's place as a kidnap victim. Part of his statement read:

If Russ Little and Joe Remiro are innocent in the Foster murder and are in fact victims of a police state, then how in heaven's name can the kidnapping and threatened execution of Patricia Hearst have any significance to Russ and Joe but to sustain their indictment? ... Seeing as Russ is the only son I have, at least you could have the satisfaction of knowing that you had been instrumental in the destruction of not only Russell but of his whole family. I beg you to think about it, and please agree to release that child unharmed.

== Sentencing ==
In February 1975, the jury in the murder and attempted murder trial of Remiro and Little sent a note to the judge that it had been unable to reach a verdict in the case. A new jury was selected. It convicted both men.

On June 27, 1975, Little and Remiro were sentenced to life imprisonment for murder and the attempted murder of Foster's assistant, Robert Blackburn. There was no positive eyewitness identifications of either man at the murder scene, and considerable circumstantial evidence, including possession of the murder weapon, was relied upon. The pair was also sentenced for the shooting incident that occurred on their apprehension, as well as an assault that occurred on a prison officer in January 1974.

== Personal life ==
Remiro has one son, Joshua Poole. Poole has married three times and has a daughter by each wife.

== 1975 trial for Foster and Blackburn ==
Rudy Henderson, a former boss of Nancy Ling Perry, testified at the 1975 trial that Ling Perry had confessed to him prior to her death in 1974 that she, DeFreeze, Wolfe, and two other members who were killed in the Los Angeles shootout had shot Foster.

On February 18, 1976, Patty Hearst at her armed robbery trial testified that she had been told that Little and Remiro were waiting in the car while Foster was killed by other members. But Bill Harris said that neither had been at the ambush. Little and Remiro released a statement through their attorney saying that Hearst was "lying" about their involvement.

On February 28, 1979, Little's conviction was overturned by the California Court of Appeal. The three-judge panel on the Appeal Court said one of their reasons for overturning his conviction was that Superior Court judge Elvin Sheehy had issued a "dynamite charge" to a deadlocked jury. This charge asks holdout jurors to reevaluate their decision and urges them to reach a conclusion. In 1977, the California Supreme Court ruled that this dynamite charge prejudiced the right to a fair jury trial. One of the Justices at Little's appeal argued that Remiro's conviction should also be overturned. In June 1981, Little was acquitted in a retrial of the Foster/Blackburn case in Monterey County.

After winning his freedom, Little said, "Who actually pulled the trigger that killed Foster was Mizmoon [Note: Patricia Soltysik]. Nancy [Ling Perry] was supposed to shoot Blackburn, she kind of botched that and DeFreeze ended up shooting him with a shotgun."

In 1988, Bill Harris said that he continued to believe in the innocence of both Little and Remiro for the Foster/Blackburn attack.

Remiro was sentenced to life at Pelican Bay State Prison. By 2004, he had been denied parole a dozen times. However, in 2024, author Roger Rappaport said that Remiro had been paroled in 2018, though this was not publicized at the time.
