= Black Cultural Association =

- Leader: Colston Westbrook
- Dates active: 1968-1973
- Headquarters: California Medical Facility
- Active regions: Vacaville, California

The Black Cultural Association (BCA) was an African-American inmate group founded in 1968 at the California Medical Facility at Vacaville, a California state prison, and formally recognized by prison officials in 1969. The primary purpose of the BCA was to provide educational tutoring to inmates, which it did in conjunction with graduate college students from the nearby San Francisco Bay Area. Outsiders were allowed to attend meetings of the BCA, and tutors provided remedial and advanced courses in mathematics, reading, writing, art, history, political science, and sociology. In time, radical political organizations such as Venceremos infiltrated the BCA, giving rise to BCA factions such as Unisight, which eventually gave birth to the Symbionese Liberation Army.

== Origins ==
The 1960s were famous for numerous social movements, including the Black Panther Party in California. This increase in racial tension across the nation fed to rising concerns about the African-American population. The Black Panther Party was created to watch the actions of police forces in Los Angeles making sure that they were protecting the public as a whole, not a specific race. In Oakland, the number of arrests dramatically increased, which led to an increase in prison populations. In the State of California's prisoners statistics it states that the populations of inmates on December 31, 1960, was 21,660 persons. 8 years later on December 31, 1968 the population had increased to a high of 28,462. During the 1960s the black distribution in California prisons was 20.8 percent but gradually increased to 34.1 percent by the 1980s. The same people who were demanding social reforms found themselves in jail demanding prison reforms for those of color. From this rise in black inmate population came the Black Cultural Association, or the BCA. Their goal was to educate black inmates on basic educational skills as well as foster an environment for black empowerment.

== Timeline ==
- 1954: The Civil Rights Movement Begins
- 1968: Civil Rights Act of 1968, which prevented "by force or by threat of force, injure, intimidate, or interfere with anyone…by reason of their race, color, religion, or national origin."
- 1968: The Black Cultural Association is founded.
- 1971: The Black Cultural Association becomes an officially recognized prison group under the tutoring system put in place by linguistic professor Colston Westbrook.
- 1972: The BCA gains popularity with white radicals through the help of William Wolfe. White activists begin to attend BCA meetings with the approval of Colston Westbrook.
- 1972: The Maximum Psychiatric Diagnostic Unit at the Vacaville prison begins doing illegal experimentation on inmates, sparking controversy over fair treatment.
- December 1972: Rumors spread within the BCA that Westbrook was connected to the Central Intelligence Agency, therefore part of administering drug tests to black inmates.
- 1973: The group gains peak attendance, with about 100 inmates part of the BCA.

== Education, tutors, and members ==
=== Educational tutoring and politics ===
The main purpose of the BCA was to provide educational tutoring for inmates. For two years the BCA operated without much direction. However, in 1971 the BCA was officially recognized by the California Medical Facility. University of California-Berkeley linguistic professor, Colston Westbrook was recruited to organize an educational tutoring system for the group. Westbrook's goal was to instill racial pride in the prisoners and provide self-help. Westbrook brought in a group of tutors to teach math, reading, writing, art, political science, black sociology, and African heritage. A majority of the BCA tutors were white students from the University of California at Berkeley that held leftist and radical beliefs. BCA tutors included Russell Little and William Wolfe. As well as Patricia Soltysik, Nancy Ling Perry, and Patty Hearst (who used a fake ID with the name Mary Alice Siem), according to Lake Headley, a private investigator. The group began to grow and started to meet two to three times a week. Over time, the BCA evolved from an educational group into more of a political group that focused on radical ideals and black empowerment. Because the focus of the group shifted away from the conventional educational group, no statistics could be found on how successful the program was at improving the education of prisoners.

=== Donald DeFreeze ===
One notable member of the BCA was a black prisoner named Donald DeFreeze. Defreeze became close with Westbrook and quickly embraced the revolutionary fantasy that was fostered in the BCA. Eventually, DeFreeze was transferred to Soledad State Prison where he then escaped. Following his escape he teamed up with fellow BCA members Russell Little and William Wolfe, as well as Bill and Emily Harris and Angela Atwood, to create the Symbionese Liberation Army.

== List of tutors and members ==
BCA Coordinator: Colston Westbrook

Member and Inmate: Donald DeFreeze

BCA Visitor/Tutor: William Wolfe

BCA Visitor/Tutor: Russell Little

BCA Visitor/Tutor: Patricia Soltysik

BCA Visitor/Tutor: Nancy Ling Perry

BCA Visitor/Tutor: Patty Hearst aka Mary Alice Siem

== Group evolution ==
The Black Cultural Association met regularly with outside volunteers, some of which did not teach basic educational skills. Tutors and prisoners tended to have discussions on radical ideas, often influencing inmates to join their way of thinking. Donald DeFreeze was one inmate who converted his political ideas after attending BCA meetings. Soon after, DeFreeze broke off from the Black Cultural Association and created his own group within the prison. Willie Wolfe and Russ Little were two white volunteers that joined the small group DeFreeze set up, as well as ex-Black panther and inmate Thero Wheeler. This small group of radical-left's is considered the beginning of the Symbionese Liberation Army, or the SLA. Other volunteers at Vacaville prison were members of the Venceremos, a radical Chicano political organization. When the Venceremos political group became inactive, it joined forces with DeFreeze and the SLA to fight for prison reforms and black rights.

== Conspiracy ==
Because the BCA operated with major political overtones under the pretense of education, many feared the group as a means to control the inmates and fuel the social unrest of the time. Various conspiracy theories involved the accusations that the group was transformed into an assassin group rather than one based purely for education. With inmates cut off from the outside world and their only information being fed to them by the radical tutors, it is believed by some that the group plotted revolution and other drastic means for social change. Louis Nelson, warden at San Quentin stated in a memo:

We are reading in the public press, and hearing via television and radio, that the best breeding and/or recruiting ground for neo-revolutionaries is in the prison system…. I am witnessing the deterioration of our ethnic organizations, which were once dedicated to the educational improvement of our men inside San Quentin, to para-military organizations with revolutionary overtones…. I do not believe that as the propagation of revolutionary acts or material. In fact, I believe it to be the exact opposite of my duty…. I intend to draw the line at revolutionary education.

Suspicions gained truth when radical groups calling for revolution such as the SLA branched off from and eventually took over the BCA. It abandoned education as its purpose and focused instead on political revolution.

== See also ==
- Symbionese Liberation Army
- Black Panther Party
- Black Power Movement
- Black Liberation Army
- Venceremos Organization
- Weather Underground
