= Sara Jane Olson =

American bank robber (born 1947)

- Born: Kathleen Ann Soliah; January 16, 1947 (age 79); Fargo, North Dakota, U.S.
- Education: University of California, Santa Barbara (B.A.)
- Movement: Symbionese Liberation Army

Sara Jane Olson (born Kathleen Ann Soliah, January 16, 1947) is an American far-left activist who was a member of the Symbionese Liberation Army (SLA) in 1975. The group disbanded and she was a fugitive for decades before being arrested. In 2001, she pleaded guilty to attempted murder related to a failed bombing plot. In 2003 she pleaded guilty to second-degree murder related to the death of a customer during a botched bank robbery the SLA committed in California. Known then as Soliah, she was also accused of helping a group hide Patty Hearst, a kidnapped newspaper heiress, in 1974. After being federally indicted in 1976, Soliah was a wanted fugitive for several decades. She lived for periods in Zimbabwe and the U.S. states of Washington and Minnesota.

While in Minnesota, she legally changed her name to Sara Jane Olson, married, and had a family. Arrested in 1999, she pleaded guilty in 2001 to two counts of possessing explosives with intent to murder, and in 2003 to second-degree murder, both stemming from her SLA activities in the 1970s. She was sentenced to 14 years in prison. She was mistakenly released for five days in March 2008 due to an error made in calculating her parole and was rearrested. She was released on parole on March 17, 2009.

On November 4, 2020, Olson was arrested along with several others for blocking Interstate 94 in Minneapolis during a protest.

== Early life and education ==
Kathleen Soliah was born on January 16, 1947, in Fargo, North Dakota, the daughter of Elsie Soliah (née Engstrøm) and Martin Soliah, while her family was living in Barnesville, Minnesota. When she was eight, her conservative Norwegian Lutheran family moved to Palmdale, California, where her father worked as an English teacher and coach at Palmdale High School. Soliah attended the University of California, Santa Barbara, where she initially majored in English. In college, she participated in theater and was cast in a production of J.B.

== Symbionese Liberation Army ==
1976 fugitive alert for Soliah

After graduating with a bachelor of arts degree in theater, Soliah moved to Berkeley, California, with her boyfriend, James Kilgore.

She met Angela Atwood at an acting audition where they both won lead roles. They became inseparable during the play's run. Atwood tried to sponsor Soliah as a member of the Symbionese Liberation Army (SLA), a leftist group she had joined. Soliah, Kilgore, and Soliah's brother Steve and sister Josephine followed the SLA closely without joining.

Atwood and five other core members of the SLA, including leader Donald DeFreeze, were killed in May 1974 during a standoff and shootout with police at a house near Watts, Los Angeles. They were being pursued for armed robbery of banks, the November 1973 murder of Oakland school superintendent Marcus Foster, and the 1974 kidnapping of heiress Patty Hearst.

The Soliahs organized memorial rallies for the SLA victims, including one in Berkeley's Willard Park (called Ho Chi Minh park by activists), where Soliah spoke in support of Atwood and was covertly filmed by the FBI.

She said that SLA members had been:

viciously attacked and murdered by 500 pigs in L.A. while the whole nation watched. Well, I believe that Gelina [Atwood] and her comrades fought until the last minutes, and though I would like to have her with me here right now, I know that she lived happy and she died happy. And in that sense, I'm so very proud of her. SLA soldiers – I know it is not necessary to say; but keep on fighting. I'm with you and we are with you!

Soliah asserted that Atwood "was a truly revolutionary woman ... among the first white women to fight so righteously for their beliefs and to die for what they believed in".

Founding SLA member and fugitive Emily Harris visited Soliah, who was working at a bookstore. Soliah later recalled, "I was glad she was alive. I expected them to be killed at any time." She felt sorry for the group and agreed to help the remaining members hide from the police and FBI. She assisted them by procuring supplies for their San Francisco hideout, and birth certificates of dead infants that could be reused for false identification.

=== Crocker National Bank robbery and Myrna Opsahl murder ===
On April 21, 1975, SLA members robbed the Crocker National Bank in Carmichael, California. In the process they killed Myrna Opsahl, a mother of four depositing money for her church.

Patty Hearst, who had acted as getaway driver during the crime, later provided the information that led police to implicate the SLA in the robbery and murder. She identified Soliah as one of the robbers. According to Hearst, Soliah kicked a pregnant teller in the abdomen, leading to her suffering a miscarriage.

Police later searched Soliah's room at the SLA safehouse on Precita Avenue in San Francisco. They found several rounds of 9 mm ammunition on the floor and in a 9 mm Browning Hi-Power semi-automatic pistol in Soliah's dresser drawer. Manufacturing marks appeared to match similar cartridges found in Opsahl's body during the autopsy. In 2002, new forensics technology allowed police to link these shells definitively to those found at Crocker Bank; they charged former members of SLA, including Soliah, with the crime. Prosecutor Michael Latin said that Soliah was tied to the crime through fingerprints, a palm print, and handwriting evidence. The palm print was found on a garage door where the SLA kept a getaway car.

=== Los Angeles Police Department bombs ===
1978 FBI wanted poster

On August 21, 1975, a bomb that came close to detonating was discovered where a Los Angeles Police Department patrol car had been parked earlier in front of an International House of Pancakes restaurant. After the bomb was discovered, all Los Angeles police were ordered to search under their cars and another bomb was found in front of a police station about a mile away. Soliah was accused of planting the bombs in an attempt to avenge the SLA members who had died in 1974 in the shootout with LA police.

The pipe bombs were rigged to detonate as the patrol cars drove away. One police officer present that day described the first bomb as one of "the most dangerous pipe bombs he had ever seen" and said:

This device was designed to go off when that car was moved, and the only way you move a car is to get in and drive it. This bomb wasn't directed against property. It wasn't directed against the car. You could have thrown a device under the car and lit a fuse and then ran. It was directed at whoever got in the car and moved it, however, it would have also taken out anybody in the vicinity.

Soliah and five other SLA members were indicted in 1976 for setting the police bombs. She vanished before the trial could start. When Soliah was brought to trial at the turn of the century, prosecutors did not believe the evidence against her was a "slam dunk" but did believe it was enough to convince a jury of her guilt. Two witnesses who testified in the 1976 grand jury indictment had died by the time Soliah (now known as Sara Jane Olson) was tried. At the grand jury, a plumber who had sold materials used in the bomb had picked Soliah out of a lineup as one of the buyers. A bomb expert had said the explosive could have been built in Soliah's apartment. Police could not identify any fingerprints on the devices other than those of the officers who had disarmed them. But Soliah's fingerprint, handwriting, and signature were identified on a letter sent to order a fuse that could only be used for bomb-making. Components matching those used in the police car bombs were found in a locked closet at the Precita Avenue house where Soliah lived with the other remaining members of the SLA.

== Underground life, capture, and prosecution ==
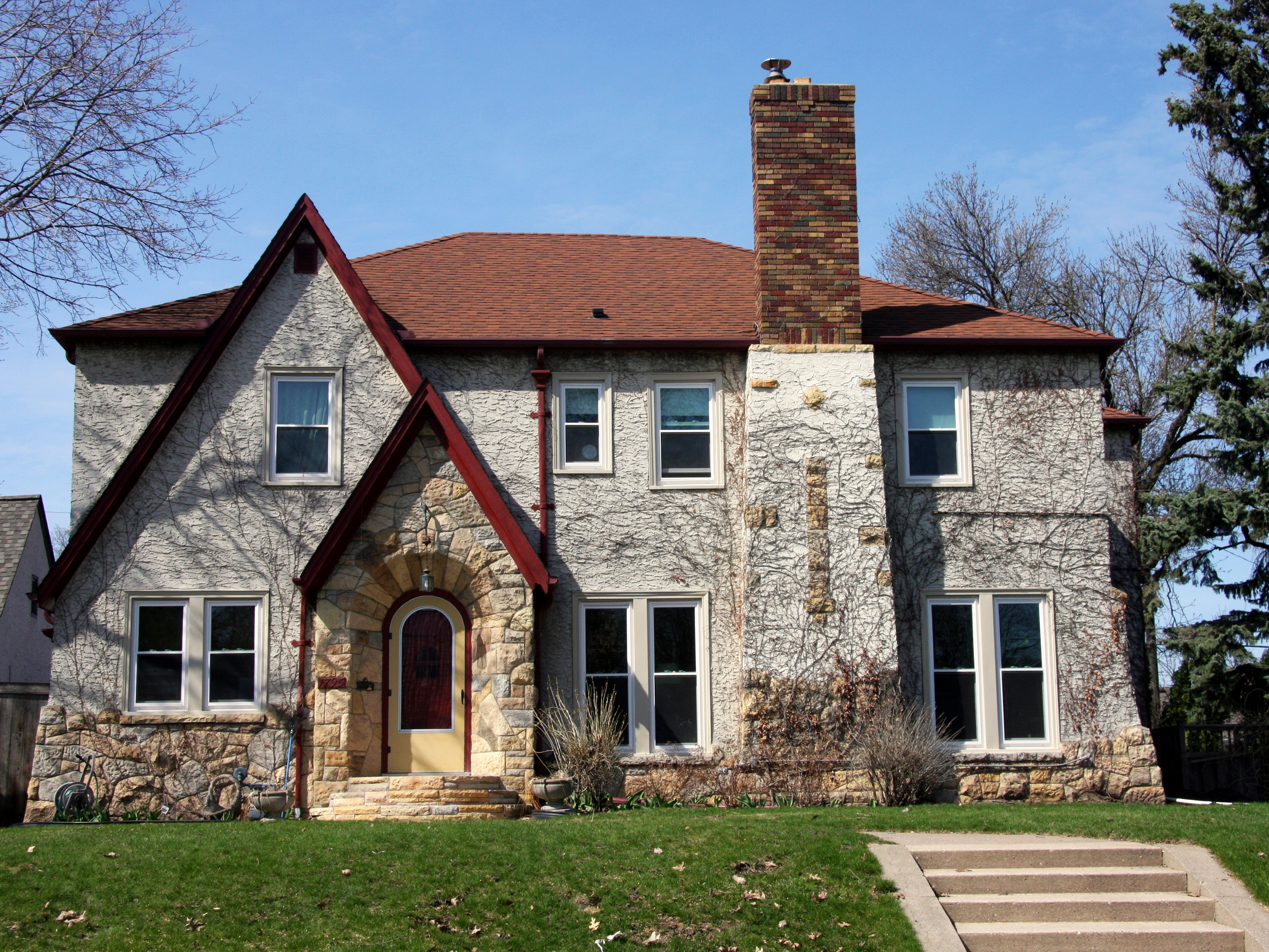
The house where Soliah lived under an assumed name in St. Paul, Minnesota

In February 1976, a grand jury indicted Soliah in the bombing case. She went underground and became a fugitive for 23 years, during which she moved to Minnesota and assumed the alias Sara Jane Olson. Olson is a common surname in the state because of the large Scandinavian-American population.

In 1980, Soliah married physician Gerald Frederick "Fred" Peterson, with whom she had three daughters. She and Peterson also lived in Zimbabwe, where Peterson worked for a British medical missionary group. After their return, they settled in Saint Paul, Minnesota, where Soliah picked up her acting career. She was active in Saint Paul community issues. Her husband described the family as interested in progressive social causes.

On March 3, 1999, and again on May 15, 1999, Soliah was profiled on the America's Most Wanted television program. After a tip generated by the show, she was arrested on June 16, 1999. Soliah was charged in the police bomb case with conspiracy to commit murder, possession of explosives, explosion, and attempt to ignite an explosive with intent to murder.

Shortly after her arrest, Soliah legally changed her name to Sara Jane Olson. She also published a cookbook, Serving Time: America's Most Wanted Recipes.

On October 31, 2001, she accepted a plea bargain and pleaded guilty to two counts of possessing explosives with intent to murder. As part of a plea bargain, the other charges were dropped.

=== Plea controversy ===
Immediately after entering the plea, Olson told reporters that she was innocent. She said that she had taken a plea bargain because, due to the political climate after the September 11 attacks, she believed that an accused bomber could not receive a fair jury trial:

It became clear to me that the incident would have a remarkable effect on the outcome of this trial ... the effect was probably going to be negative. That's really what governed this decision, not the truth or honesty, but what was probably in my best interests and the interests of my family.

Angered by Olson's announcement that she had lied in court, Superior Court Judge Larry Fidler ordered another hearing on November 6. There he asked her several times if she was guilty of the charges. Olson replied, "I want to make it clear, Your Honor, that I did not make that bomb. I did not possess that bomb. I did not plant that bomb. But under the concept of aiding and abetting, I plead guilty."

On November 13, Olson filed a motion requesting to withdraw her guilty plea, acknowledging that she understood the judge when he read the charges against her. Rather, she said:

I realize I cannot plead guilty when I know I am not. ... Cowardice prevented me from doing what I knew I should: Throw caution aside and move forward to trial. ... I am not second-guessing my decision as much as I have found the courage to take what I know is the honest course. Please, Judge Fidler, grant my request to go to trial.

=== Sentencing in explosives charges ===
On December 3, 2001, Judge Fidler offered to let Olson testify under oath about her role in the case. She refused. He said, "I took those pleas twice... were you lying to me then or are you lying to me now?" and denied her request to withdraw her plea.

Observers expected her to serve three to five years, but on January 18, 2002, she was sentenced to two consecutive 10-years-to-life terms. At Soliah's 2002 sentencing hearing on the bombing, police officer John Hall, who had been in the car parked over the bomb, talked about a little girl who stood feet away with her family:

Your honor, it horrifies me to think that the lives of dozens of innocent people, like that child in the window [would have ended] in an instant had the defendant and her co conspirators successfully carried out their terrorist acts.

Fidler said that under California law, the Board of Prison Terms could later reduce the sentence. Olson's lawyers asserted that due to discrepancies between 1970s laws and current California laws, Olson would most likely serve five years, which could be reduced to two years for good behavior. The Board of Prison Terms did later change the sentence.

At Olson's sentencing hearing, her teenage daughter Leila, her pastor, and her husband spoke in her defense. Her mother testified on the stand that Olson had never been part of the SLA. She criticized prosecutors and police, who she asserted had harassed the family.

=== Sentencing in Opsahl murder ===
On January 16, 2002, first-degree murder charges for the killing of Myrna Opsahl were filed against Olson and four other SLA members: Emily Harris, Bill Harris, Michael Bortin (who had married Olson's sister Josephine), and James Kilgore, who remained a fugitive. Judge Fidler arraigned Olson on the murder charges immediately following her sentencing hearing on January 18 for the explosives case. Olson pleaded not guilty to that charge at the time.

On November 7, 2002, along with the other three defendants, Olson pleaded guilty to a reduced charge of second-degree murder. On February 14, 2003, she was sentenced to the maximum term allowed under her plea bargain, six years, to be served concurrently with the 14-year sentence she was already serving.

== Incarceration and release ==
The state Board of Prison Terms had scrapped Olson's original sentence in October 2002 in exchange for a longer 14-year sentence, saying Olson's crimes had the potential for great violence and targeted multiple victims. She appealed, and in July 2004, a judge said there was "no analysis" of how the state Board of Prison Terms had decided 14 years was appropriate and threw the sentence out. Her sentence was converted to five years and four months.

The State appealed and an appeals court panel restored her full 14-year sentence as of April 12, 2007. It ruled that a lower court did not follow procedure when it allowed Olson to appeal.

Olson served her time at the Central California Women's Facility in Chowchilla. Her custody status was "Close A", which is reserved for inmates requiring the most supervision. This status limited her privileges and required that she be counted seven times a day. It also prevented her from seeking relocation to a facility closer to her home. David Nickerson, Olson's attorney, said that her status reflected the Department of Corrections' view that she was a potential flight risk.

Olson's husband and three daughters continued to support her during her imprisonment; they took turns visiting her frequently in Chowchilla.

In a 2007 interview with Marie Claire magazine (published by Hearst Corporation), Olson's 23-year-old daughter Emily Peterson dismissed her mother's radical past with the SLA. She said of her mother, "She lived in Berkeley. It was kind of normal... I always tell people she wasn't a terrorist. She was an urban guerrilla." Olson never publicly expressed remorse or regret for her actions.

=== Release from prison and rearrest ===
Olson was released on parole from the Central California Women's Facility in Chowchilla on March 17, 2008. For five days, she stayed at her mother's home in Palmdale and spent some time hiking with her husband.

On March 21, 2008, she was rearrested when it was decided that she had been mistakenly released a year early from prison due to a miscalculation by the parole board. Her attorney claimed that the action was politically motivated. Olson was taken back into custody by the California Department of Corrections and placed in the California Institution for Women in Corona for another year.

=== Release and parole ===
After serving seven years in prison, about half her sentence, Olson was released on March 17, 2009, to serve her parole in Minnesota. Police unions in both Minnesota and California protested the arrangement, saying that they believed her parole should be served in California, where her crimes were committed.

In a letter to California Governor Arnold Schwarzenegger, Minnesota Governor Tim Pawlenty also protested Olson being allowed to return to Minnesota.

== Interstate 94 protest ==
Years after her return to Minnesota, on November 4, 2020, Olson participated in a protest in Minneapolis called by the National Alliance Against Racist and Political Repression after the U.S. presidential election. Olson and several others marched onto Interstate 94, where they were met with a response from the Minneapolis Police Department and Minnesota State Patrol. Several hundred protesters were arrested.

Olson was originally charged with creating a public nuisance, but the charge was lowered to a petty misdemeanor. She rejected a plea deal offered to most of the demonstrators. On December 3, 2021, after a trial by a judge, she was convicted and fined $378. Olson appealed the conviction on the grounds that the state lacked evidence to find her guilty of using a controlled-access highway as a pedestrian. On November 21, 2022, the judge in the appeal case said that the circumstances of the events did not support Olson's innocence and denied the appeal.
