= Camilla Hall =

Symbionese Liberation Army member (1945–1974)

- Born: March 24, 1945; St. Peter, Minnesota, U.S.
- Died: May 17, 1974 (aged 29); Los Angeles, California, U.S.
- Cause of death: Gunshot wound to the head
- Other name: Gabi
- Education: Gustavus Adolphus College; Univ. of Minnesota (B.A., 1967)
- Movement: Symbionese Liberation Army

Camilla Christine Hall (March 24, 1945 – May 17, 1974) was a member of the Symbionese Liberation Army (SLA), a small, far-left militant group that committed violent acts between 1973 and 1975. They assassinated Marcus Foster, Superintendent of the Oakland Public Schools and the first black superintendent of any major school system, kidnapped heiress Patty Hearst, and committed armed robbery of banks.

Hall, one of the majority of white members in the group, died on May 17, 1974, with five other SLA members in a shootout with the Los Angeles Police Department in that city. During this, the house where the SLA members were making their stand caught fire. Police fatally shot both Hall and Nancy Ling Perry as they left the house.

== Early life ==
On March 24, 1945, Camilla Christine Hall was born in Saint Peter, Minnesota. Both her parents, George Fridolph Hall (1908–2000) and Lorena (Daeschner) Hall (1911–1995), were academics with positions at Gustavus Adolphus College in Saint Peter from 1938 to 1952. In addition, her father was a minister in the Augustana Evangelical Lutheran Church and later the Evangelical Lutheran Church in America. Her mother helped found Gustavus Adolphus College's Art Department and served as the department head.

Camilla Hall was the only surviving child of four. Firstborn son Terry died of congenital heart disease in 1948; Peter died in 1951, and Nan died in 1962, both of a congenital kidney disease. The family seemed burdened by grief.

In 1952, the Hall family moved to what is now Tanzania in East Africa. George and Lorena Hall taught in schools and did mission work, while Camilla and Nan played with the native children. In 1954, when Camilla was nine, the family returned to Saint Peter because of seven-year-old Nan's poor health. While Camilla attended elementary school in Minnesota and lived with relatives, her birth family moved to Montclair, New Jersey.

In Minnesota, Hall attended Washburn High School in Minneapolis, where she was involved in many activities. The 1963 Washburn Yearbook states, "Candy was a member of Blue Tri, Class Play, Poplars Staff, Quill Club, Forensics, Pep Club, and Hall of Fame". Blue Tri club was an organization that encouraged Christian ideals and put together service projects. In addition, Camilla Hall was voted class clown in high school. In 1963, she graduated from Washburn High School.

== Education ==
Hall attended Gustavus Adolphus College in St. Peter, Minnesota. She transferred to the University of Minnesota after her freshman year. On June 10, 1967, Hall graduated with a humanities degree.

== Post-college ==
After graduation, Hall moved to Duluth, Minnesota, where she started as a caseworker for social services in St. Louis County. She also began to participate in Democratic Party activities. In early 1968, she was elected to carry the Eugene McCarthy banner for the St. Louis County precinct, in support of McCarthy's presidential campaign that year.

Although Hall enjoyed helping people in her work, she found it difficult to keep distance from some of their problems while being a caseworker. For her job in Duluth, Hall used her musical and poetic talents in an advertising campaign.

In June 1968, Hall returned to Minneapolis, where she was a caseworker for the Hennepin County, Minnesota welfare office. Co-workers and friends of Hall described her as witty, sympathetic, helpful, and compassionate. She had an outgoing personality and had a passion for literature. At the same time, Hall frequently talked with family and friends about philosophy and how she was disappointed with the state of welfare. In 1968, Hall was 23 years old. She carefully monitored the political situation in America, including the 1968 Democratic National Convention in Chicago where there was so much violence. She was active in the peace movement and food boycotts, including the Mobilization Committee to End the War in Vietnam. Despite Hall's participating in political activities, urging social change, and working to aid individuals and families, her mother could see that Camilla became dissatisfied with her work.

== Move to California ==
In November 1969, Hall moved to Topanga, a northern suburb of Los Angeles, California. In March, she moved into Los Angeles proper in west Los Angeles. According to Rachael Hanel, "She lived off her savings, interest income from a trust, money from her parents, and selling her simple, Rubenesque line drawings." Although Hall didn't express dissatisfaction at being an artist, she decided to move again.

Hall moved to Berkeley in northern California in February 1971, which had become a center of political activism and social movements. In May 1971, Hall moved into an apartment complex on Channing Way where she met Patricia Soltysik. The two women began a lesbian relationship, which was the first time Hall had done so publicly. Hall wrote about Soltysik in a love poem named "Mizmoon", and nicknamed her that.

In Berkeley, Hall continued being politically active. She participated in the People's Park reoccupation during the summer of 1972, following the shootings there the year before. She and Soltysik became involved with the Venceremos prison outreach project, through which they became associates of two white men, Russ Little and Willie Wolfe, who were also assisting in prisoner outreach.

In October 1972, Hall traveled to Europe. She stayed with friends while she traveled for three months. Once she returned to California, she continued being politically active. Through her association with Soltysik, Little, and Wolfe, she became a founding member of the Symbionese Liberation Army, a small, radical leftist group. Joe Remiro and Thero Wheeler trained the other members in handling weapons and explosives. Remiro was a veteran of Vietnam.

The SLA gained notoriety in November 1973 by claiming credit for the assassination of Marcus Foster, Superintendent of the Oakland Public Schools and the first black to be superintendent of any major city's school district. Three "soldiers" also wounded his deputy. In January 1974 the SLA base was moved to Concord, California, where Nancy Ling Perry rented a house under an assumed name. Russ Little and Joe Remiro were arrested after a police stop and confrontation, convicted and sentenced to prison.

In February 1974 the SLA kidnapped heiress Patty Hearst. They indoctrinated her and she said she chose to join them. Hall and Hearst were identified from security camera images as participants in the April 15, 1974, armed robbery of the Hibernia Bank in San Francisco. Two civilians were shot during the robbery.

== LA shootout ==
The police kept up pressure on the group, which moved to a house in Los Angeles. There Hall died in a shootout (May 17, 1974) with police in which five other SLA members also died. As their hideout burned, Hall and Nancy Ling Perry exited from the back door. Police claimed that Perry came out firing a revolver and Hall was firing an automatic pistol. Police shot them immediately, killing both. Perry was shot twice. One shot hit her right lung, the other shot severed her spine. Hall was shot once in the forehead. Angela Atwood, another SLA member, pulled Hall's body back into the burning house. Atwood died in the fire.

Investigators working for Hall's parents claimed that Perry had walked out of the house intending to surrender.

== Funeral ==
Hall's parents held a funeral for their daughter on May 23, 1974, at St. John's Lutheran Church, in Lincolnwood, Illinois, a Chicago suburb, where he was pastor. Seven of his fellow Lutheran ministers conducted the service. Camilla Hall's name was not mentioned. Her ashes were buried on August 19, 1974, in a small country graveyard where her late siblings were buried, who each died before she was 16. Her parents also have plots there.
