= Emily Harris =

SLA member (born 1947)

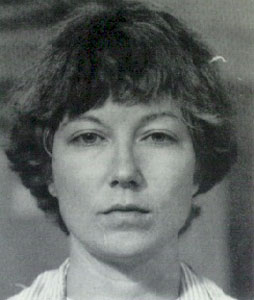
- Emily Harris's 1975 mugshot
- Born: February 11, 1947 (age 79); Baltimore, Maryland
- Other names: Yolanda; Emily Montague Schwartz
- Movement: Symbionese Liberation Army

Emily Harris (born February 11, 1947, as Emily Montague Schwartz) was, along with her husband William Harris (b. 1945), a member of the Symbionese Liberation Army (SLA), an American left-wing group involved in murder, kidnapping, and bank robberies. In the 1970s, she was convicted of kidnapping Patty Hearst.

In 2003, she was convicted of murder in the second degree for being the shooter in a 1975 slaying that occurred while she and other SLA members were robbing a bank in California. She was sentenced to eight years in prison for the murder.

== Early life ==
Born in Baltimore, Maryland, and raised in Clarendon Hills, Illinois, Emily Montague Schwartz was the daughter of Frederick Schwartz, an engineer, and his wife, and had a middle-class upbringing. She graduated from Indiana University Bloomington with a bachelor's degree in language arts.

== Founding the Symbionese Liberation Army ==
She married William Harris, whom she had met at Indiana University in Bloomington. They moved to Berkeley, California, in 1973, traveling with friends Gary Atwood and Angela Atwood. They soon joined a left-wing group organized through the university in Berkeley that, among other things, visited inmates in prisons in northern California to tutor them and prepare them for life outside. Late that year the Harrises met an escaped prisoner, Donald DeFreeze, who was staying with white leftist activists in Berkeley.

He and Patricia Soltysik, a white woman also called Mizmoon, co-founded what became the Symbionese Liberation Army, a leftist group that promoted joining all the progressive causes. Other founding members were Nancy Ling Perry, Joe Remiro, Russ Little, Willie Wolfe, Angela Atwood, Thero Wheeler, and Camilla Hall. Rejecting the group's plans for armed confrontations, Wheeler left in the fall. DeFreeze was the only remaining Black member. Remiro was Latino; all the others were white. The Harrises, also white, joined the group.

Emily Harris and the others took noms de guerre as SLA soldiers: hers was 'Yolanda'. On November 6, the SLA committed its first public act, the assassination of Marcus Foster, Oakland, California, school superintendent and the first black superintendent of any major public school system. SLA activists mistakenly thought Foster had approved a plan to require student identification cards for Oakland high schools, which they denounced as fascist, thinking they could recruit followers by their action. But Foster was popular in the black community, and people were outraged at his murder.

In February 1974 SLA members kidnapped Patty Hearst, a college student and one of the heirs to the Hearst newspaper empire. This action attracted much more media attention, as did the group's demands that Hearst's family provide compensation to the poor in California as a kind of ransom.

== Later SLA and Opsahl murder ==
Emily and Bill Harris and Hearst, who had joined the SLA, were involved in other activities on May 17, 1974, when six core SLA members were confronted at their safe house in South Central Los Angeles. In the shootout with police that followed and a subsequent house fire, all six were killed, including erstwhile leader DeFreeze.

Emily and Bill Harris claimed the leadership of the SLA, and fled the city with Hearst. They spent more than a year eluding the authorities with Hearst, including some time in hiding on the East Coast. After their return to California, they acquired new members Wendy Yoshimura, a California radical who had assisted the trio in the East, and several Soliah family members and relations: Kathleen Soliah and her boyfriend Jim Kilgore, her sister Josephine and her husband Mike Bortin, and their brother Steven Soliah.

Hearst had become a participant in SLA crimes. Yoshimura, Patty's closest friend while underground, was a fugitive because explosives had been stored in a garage she rented. During that year on the run the SLA committed a string of crimes, including an April 21, 1975, armed robbery of Crocker National Bank in Carmichael, California.

During the robbery, customer 42-year-old Myrna Opsahl, a mother of four, was fatally shot. Opsahl was depositing a church collection at the time. Hearst stated in her autobiography Every Secret Thing (1982) that Emily Harris was the shooter. Hearst wrote that Harris had said, "Oh, she's dead, but it doesn't really matter. She was a bourgeois pig anyway. Her husband is a doctor." Reportedly other SLA members had urged Harris against bringing the shotgun to the robbery, as it had accidentally discharged twice during preparations.

The Harrises were eventually arrested, convicted of their part in the Hearst kidnapping, and served eight years in prison. They were represented by attorney Leonard Weinglass. Imprisoned at the California Institution for Women in Corona, California, Emily Harris spent the first half of her term in solitary confinement. Emily learned computer programming in prison.

== Life after first prison term ==
After her release from prison in 1983, Harris became a computer programmer. She began a successful computer consulting company. She worked at MGM Studios (and The Walt Disney Company) until her second conviction. She and her husband divorced.

== Opsahl murder charges ==
For over 25 years no one was charged in the Opsahl murder. The SLA wore wigs and masks during the Crocker Bank robbery, and left little evidence behind.

However, with new forensics techniques, the FBI was eventually able to link shotgun pellets removed from Opsahl's body to shotgun shells found in an SLA hideout. Additional evidence mounted. In January 2002 Harris and three other SLA members were charged with the Opsahl murder. Harris's bail was set at $1,000,000, which her supporters quickly gathered.

Three former SLA members who had been granted immunity – Hearst, Steven Soliah, and Wendy Yoshimura – were set to testify for the prosecution in the Opsahl case.

Facing a possible conviction, Harris and the others pleaded guilty to second-degree murder in November 2002. Emily Harris was sentenced to eight additional years in prison; Bill Harris was sentenced to seven years, and Kathleen Soliah and Michael Bortin were each sentenced to six years for their roles.

Emily Harris was paroled in February 2007 after having served four years in prison.
