= Nancy Ling Perry =

Member of the Symbionese Liberation Army (1947–1974)

- Born: September 19, 1947; San Francisco, United States
- Died: May 17, 1974 (aged 26); Los Angeles, United States
- Cause of death: Gunshot wound
- Other names: Nancy Devoto, Lynn Ledworth, Fahizah
- Organization: Symbionese Liberation Army

Nancy Ling Perry (September 19, 1947 – May 17, 1974, born Nancy Ling) was also known as Nancy Devoto, Lynn Ledworth, and Fahizah while a founding member of the Symbionese Liberation Army (SLA), a small leftist militant group based in northern California. Considered one of its chief theorists and activists, she died in a shootout with the Los Angeles Police Department at an SLA safehouse in that city.

== Background ==
Nancy Ling was born in San Francisco in 1947 to an upper-middle-class family. She attended Montgomery High School in Santa Rosa, where she was a cheerleader. She also served as a Sunday school teacher at her church. In 1964, while in high school, she was a campaign worker for Barry Goldwater. While in high school, Ling was also involved in Job's Daughters (Bethel #16) and served as their Honored Queen.

She began university at Whittier College. After a few semesters at Whittier, however, she transferred to the University of California, Berkeley. At Berkeley she majored in English.

Ling met Black jazz musician Gilbert Perry when he was working for a state employment office, and the couple were married December 26, 1967. Married for six years, they had a relationship described as a "love-hate affair". It ended when Gilbert left Nancy, but she remained deeply interested in black culture.

Retaining her married name, Ling Perry worked as a topless blackjack dealer in San Francisco. During this period, she was deeply involved in using psychedelic drugs and amphetamines.

== Symbionese Liberation Army ==
Perry became politically active and joined other students serving in a university-sponsored prisoner outreach program through the Black Cultural Association (BCA) at Vacaville Prison. The program was organized by Colston Westbrook, a professor at University of California, Berkeley. At Vacaville, Perry formed a relationship with black inmate Donald DeFreeze, who was active at the prison. He was given permission to see her in conjugal visits. This was unusual, as authorities generally authorized such visits only for married couples.

DeFreeze was transferred to Soledad Prison for good behavior. He escaped from there in March 1973 and made his way to Oakland, where he contacted Russ Little and some other white associates he had met through the BCA at Vacaville. Little put him in touch with Patricia Soltysik, and he started living at her apartment. They formed a sexual relationship and were co-founders of what became the Symbionese Liberation Army. Perry is also considered a co-founder.

Others in the small group were Thero Wheeler, a black convict who escaped from Vacaville in August 1973; Chicano Joe Remiro (classified as white by the New York Times), and Angela Atwood, another white woman. They were soon joined by a white married couple, Emily Harris and her husband William. All but DeFreeze, Wheeler and Remiro were white and mostly educated, from middle and upper-class families.

With Soltysik, Perry is considered to have been a chief theorist and driver of the SLA. She was the only one to identify publicly as SLA, and wrote a five-page letter to The San Francisco Chronicle in 1974 affirming this.

Initially Wheeler and Remiro, a veteran, began training the whites in the use of weapons. None had any experience with them. Wheeler was increasingly opposed to the radical plans for violence formed by SLA leaders. He believed it was the wrong direction, and withdrew in October 1973 with his heiress girlfriend Mary Alice Siem. After the two separated, he lived as a fugitive for two years before being apprehended.

The SLA first made headlines by claiming credit for the murder on November 6, 1973, of Marcus Foster, Superintendent of Oakland Public Schools. He was the first black superintendent of any major urban school system. This act outraged the black community, which had strongly admired him. In a public statement, the unknown group SLA claimed that the bullets used were tipped with the poison cyanide. This was confirmed by the city coroner and the police realized they had a new group to monitor.

Perry narrowly avoided arrest a few days later on November 11. A serial rapist appeared at the front door of her house and attempted to assault her. She stopped this and talked to police on the front lawn after they were alerted by neighbors. She managed to prevent the police from entering her house and finding the many SLA materials inside. The rapist was later apprehended.

In an effort to evade police attention after the attack on Foster and his deputy, Perry rented a house for the SLA under a false name in Concord, California, east of the Berkeley hills. Little and Remiro were stopped in that area in early January 1974 by police and exchanged shots with them. They were both arrested.

In an effort to destroy evidence linked to the SLA, Perry set the house on fire and fled. But the fire was discovered and put out, and police found numerous documents, illegal weapons, lists of target public figures, and other materials connected to the SLA. Little and Remiro were both charged and convicted of the murder of Foster and wounding of his deputy. They were sentenced to prison and assigned to San Quentin. Little's conviction was overturned on appeal, but Remiro remained in prison in 2023, the only member of the SLA still incarcerated. Parole has been repeatedly denied.

During the next several months, the SLA undertook increasingly risky actions, including kidnapping heiress Patty Hearst in February. In April they conducted an armed robbery of a bank. By this time Hearst had publicly declared she had joined the SLA; she was filmed in videos at the bank brandishing an assault weapon.

In May 1974 Nancy Ling Perry, DeFreeze, Patricia Soltysik and two other founding members of the SLA had taken refuge at a safe house in south central Los Angeles, at 1466 East 54th Street. On May 17, 1974, the Los Angeles Police Department surrounded the house with a SWAT team and a shootout began. The house accidentally caught on fire and the group hid in a crawlspace.

As the hideout burned, Perry and SLA member Camilla Hall exited the house. Police claimed that Perry was the first to come out. When police ordered her to freeze, Perry turned and began firing a revolver; police fatally shot her in response. Perry was shot twice; one shot hit her right lung, the other shot severed her spine. Camilla Hall emerged after Perry, and police said she was brandishing a pistol. She was fatally shot once in the forehead. Angela Atwood pulled Hall's body back inside the house. Investigators working for Perry's parents later claimed that Perry had left the house intending to surrender. DeFreeze died by self-inflicted gunshot in the house as the fire raged. Soltysik and Atwood also died in the house.
