= Thero Wheeler =

American domestic terrorist (1945–2009)

- Born: Thero Lavon Wheeler; January 28, 1945; Schulenburg, Texas, U.S.
- Died: March 2, 2009 (aged 64); San Francisco, California, U.S.
- Known for: Founding member of the Symbionese Liberation Army
- Children: 1

Thero Lavon Wheeler (January 28, 1945 – March 2, 2009), aka Bruce Bradley while a fugitive (1973–1975), was a founding member of the Symbionese Liberation Army, an American left-wing organization in the San Francisco Bay area. He left the group in October 1973 as he objected to its plans to undertake violent acts. Law enforcement later classified the SLA as a terrorist group.

In the following several months, SLA soldiers committed two murders, kidnapped heiress Patty Hearst, and conducted armed robberies of banks. Believed to be a member of the group, Wheeler was put on the FBI's Most Wanted List. Six of the founding members died in a shootout and fire in a house in Los Angeles in May 1974, and Wheeler was thought possibly to be among them.

But by late 1973, Wheeler was living as Bruce Bradley in Houston, Texas. He worked there as an electronics technician. He had a girlfriend and their daughter was born in early 1975. Wheeler was apprehended by the FBI in July 1975. After reviewing the case, the FBI said Wheeler was "not wanted in connection with any SLA crimes". He was returned to California to serve time for the escape and complete his previous sentence.

== Early life ==
Wheeler was born into an African-American family in Schulenburg, Texas, on January 28, 1945. His mother was Ethel Mae Anderson and his father was John Henry Wheeler. The family moved to California after World War II, in the second part of the Great Migration. He grew up in San Francisco's Fillmore and Western Addition areas. He had two brothers, one of whom became a police officer.

== Imprisonment and radicalization ==
Wheeler was convicted of assault and robbery at age 17. He was sentenced to one-year-to-life and sent to Vacaville Prison. There he began studying politics and history. He became a convict organizer, known as a "jailhouse lawyer." He read Engels, Marx and Lenin, socialist and communist theorists. He had joined the Black Panthers and a Maoist group, but resigned from both after critiquing their approaches. He also was involved for a time with Venceremos, a Chicano political group based in Palo Alto, California.

While held at Vacaville, Wheeler met some student activists from University of California, Berkeley, including Willie Wolfe and Russ Little. They were participating in a prisoner outreach program organized in part by professor Colston Westbrook and associated with the Black Cultural Association in prison. They sponsored many programs, including discussions devoted to social justice and correcting wrongs in United States society. For a time Wheeler was involved in a small prison group, Unisight, organized by Donald DeFreeze, whom he had met through the BCA. In this period, Wheeler also met Mary Alice Siem, a white Berkeley student and heiress, and they began a relationship.

== Escape ==
In August 1973, Thero Wheeler escaped from Vacaville; friends, perhaps from the nascent SLA, provided transportation and a change of clothes after he walked away from the complex. In a later prison interview, Wheeler said friends who aided his escape were "well-connected".

That fall he joined ex-con Donald DeFreeze, whom he knew from the Black Cultural Association at Vacaville, and "a curious group of upper middle-class whites, most college-educated but menially employed", at a small house in Oakland. These were the founders of the Symbionese Liberation Army (SLA).

Close friends say Wheeler split with the SLA in October 1973 because of their plans for violent tactics (as in the Marcus Foster murder) and he argued with DeFreeze and others competing for leadership. He called DeFreeze a "drunken fool" and was threatened with death. Wheeler was not impressed with the blind charge toward gratuitous violence. He was staying at the Concord house with Mary Alice Siem. On occasion DeFreeze, Soltysik, and Perry aimed guns at Siem, and Wheeler interceded on her behalf. When Wheeler and Siem decided to leave in October, their ex-comrades robbed her of $600 at gunpoint.

The couple separated: Wheeler moved to Houston, Texas, where he assumed a new name. Siem moved to Redding, California. Reported but mistaken sightings of Wheeler around the time of the Hearst kidnapping led to speculation that he was still involved, and to the notion that he was one of those killed in the Los Angeles shootout and fire.

On 4 May 1974, an article in The Pittsburgh Courier quoted Wheeler's former girlfriend Mary Alice Siem. It reported material published in The San Francisco Examiner. She said that they had left the SLA due to death threats from DeFreeze.

Mary Alice Siem, 24, Redding, Calif., told authorities she and Thero Wheeler, 29, unofficially identified two months ago as a possible suspect in the Hearst kidnapping, left the terrorist organization last October because they disagreed with the SLA's plans for violent tactics.
Miss Siem ... said she and Wheeler, who were living together, attended about 20 SLA meetings. ...
On one occasion she said she was threatened at gunpoint by DeFreeze, Miss Soltysik, and Miss Perry, but Wheeler intervened. When they left the SLA, she said she and Wheeler were robbed of $600 by the other members.
According to the Examiner, whose president and editor is Miss Hearst's father, Miss Siem told authorities that she and Wheeler left the SLA because Wheeler was opposed to the violence espoused by DeFreeze.
She said their departure took place in October, a month before the fatal shooting of Oakland Schools Superintendent Marcus Foster, for which the SLA claims responsibility, and four months before Miss Hearst was kidnapped.

But after Patty Hearst was kidnapped, a number of eyewitnesses contributed to identikit composite sketches of the men they had seen. The drawings appeared to resemble DeFreeze and Wheeler so closely that police soon attached names to these sketches. They mistakenly identified Wheeler as a suspect in the kidnapping.

== Later life ==
Wheeler moved to Texas and changed his name to Bradley Bruce. He relied on electronics skills learned in prison to gain employment. He formed a relationship with a woman and they had a daughter. His cover was blown while interceding in a dispute. When he sought hospital treatment, his alias was fed into a computer and the FBI arrested him. He was returned to California to face escape charges and continue serving his previous term. In 1976, he married Cynthia Spencer.

Wheeler died on March 2, 2009, in San Francisco.
