= James Kilgore =

American novelist, felon, and former fugitive (born 1947)

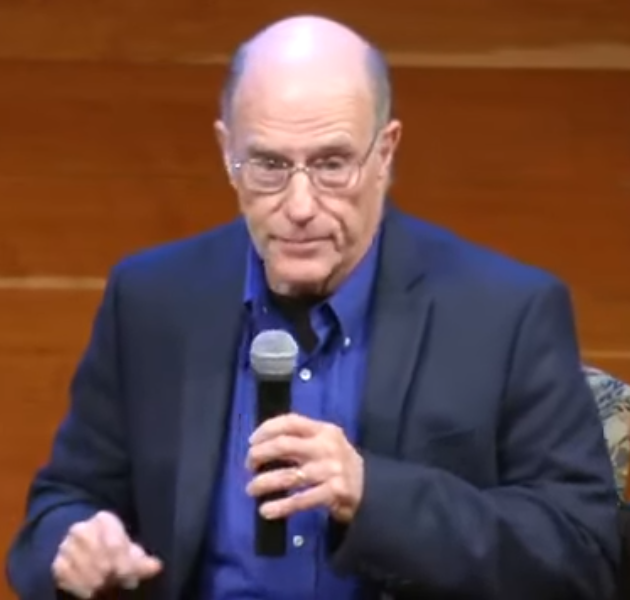
- At a National Book Foundation event in 2019
- Born: James William Kilgore; July 30, 1947 (age 79); Portland, Oregon, U.S.
- Other names: John Pape; Charles William Pape
- Education: University of California, Santa Barbara (BA); Deakin University (MA, PhD)
- Occupations: Research scholar; social justice activist; author
- Employer: University of Illinois Urbana-Champaign
- Known for: Involvement with Symbionese Liberation Army
- Criminal charges: Second degree murder Passport fraud Possession of an explosive device
- Criminal penalty: 6 year state term in High Desert State Prison--later paroled 4 year 6 month federal term in USP Lompoc
- Criminal status: Released and served

James William Kilgore (born July 30, 1947, aka John Pape) is a convicted American murderer, felon and former fugitive for his activities in the 1970s with the Symbionese Liberation Army, a left-wing terrorist organization in California. After years of research and writing, he later became a research scholar and ultimately worked at the University of Illinois' Center for African Studies in Champaign–Urbana.

After the arrest of the core SLA members in 1975, Kilgore fled a criminal indictment. He lived as a fugitive for 27 years, working in Zimbabwe, Australia, and South Africa. During his time as a fugitive, Kilgore wrote a number of books and articles under the pseudonym John Pape. He developed a career as an educator, researcher, and far-left radical activist, before being arrested in Cape Town, South Africa, in November 2002. He was extradited to the United States, where he was convicted and subsequently served six and a half years in prison in California for second degree murder.During his incarceration, he wrote several novels. The first of these, We Are All Zimbabweans Now (2009), was published a month after his release by Umuzi Publishers of Cape Town. In 2015, he published a non-fiction book, Understanding Mass Incarceration: A People's Guide to the Key Civil Rights Struggle of Our Time.

== Early years ==
Kilgore grew up in California, graduating from San Rafael High School in 1965. He attended University of California, Santa Barbara. He played on the college volleyball team and subsequently became active in politics during the anti-war protests of 1969 and 1970. During these years, he met Kathleen Soliah, and they developed a relationship. He graduated from UC Santa Barbara in 1969.

== Involvement with the Symbionese Liberation Army ==
After graduating from college, Kilgore and Olson moved to Oakland, California, where he became involved in various political activities. He also visited a number of political activists who were in prison, including Willie Brandt, convicted for his role in anti-war bombings in the San Francisco Bay Area.

In 1974, Kilgore joined the Symbionese Liberation Army, the group that kidnapped heiress Patricia Hearst in February of that year. According to Hearst's memoir, Every Secret Thing, Kilgore, Soliah, and other friends of theirs assisted Hearst and her compatriots, William and Emily Harris (née Montague), to escape the FBI after six members of the group were killed in a shootout in Los Angeles with police on May 17, 1974. Hearst also said that Kilgore took part in a number of crimes in the San Francisco Bay Area in 1974 and 1975, including a bank robbery in Carmichael, California. Hearst, Harris, and Montague were arrested in September 1975, but Kilgore remained at large.

In 2002, Kilgore, along with Harris, Montague and Olson, was indicted for participation in the Carmichael bank robbery, in which a customer was killed. The defendants, including Kilgore, subsequently pled guilty to second-degree murder in a plea deal, and all served time in California state prisons for this offense. Kilgore was released in 2009, the last of the defendants in the case to leave prison.

== Underground years ==
After the arrest of Hearst and the others, federal authorities charged Kilgore with possession of an explosive device and he went underground. He remained on the run for 27 years until November 2002, when he was arrested in Cape Town, South Africa.

According to reports by British journalist Gavin Evans, during his time as a fugitive, Kilgore constructed an alternative identity as Charles "John" Pape and worked as a teacher in Zimbabwe and South Africa. During that period he married Teresa Barnes and the couple had two children. He also lived in Australia for two years where he enrolled in Deakin University and eventually earned a Ph.D. using a false name, writing a dissertation on the history of domestic workers in Zimbabwe. There is no independent verification, however. Evans reported that Kilgore moved in 1991 to South Africa, where he became the director of Khanya College in Johannesburg, a small institution that prepared youth for university. In 1997, he and his family moved to Cape Town, where he took a position as co-director of the International Labour Research and Information Group (ILRIG), a unit affiliated with the University of Cape Town that specialized in education for union members.

Upon his arrest, a number of people in South Africa came forward to claim that Kilgore was a changed man; others said that Kilgore had murdered innocents and should stand trial. South African activist Trevor Ngwane noted that everything Kilgore

did in South Africa showed that he had broken with terrorism as a method of struggle, preferring the hard patient slog of building among ordinary workers, in the trade unions and among working-class youth. He exchanged his guns and masks for pen and paper. He stopped living between the cracks and in the night; he built a new life, took care of his family and contributed to the struggle of the workers.

Statements of support for Kilgore were also made by representatives of the South African Municipal Workers' Union, Khanya College, the University of Cape Town, the Nelson Mandela Foundation, and by Nobel Peace Prize laureate Archbishop Desmond Tutu.

US authorities had a very different perspective. US Attorney General John Ashcroft noted that the arrest of Kilgore proved that "terrorists can run and they can try to hide overseas, but in the end we will find them and bring them to justice."

Kevin Ryan, US Attorney in the San Francisco Federal Court, where Kilgore was wanted for almost three decades, said, "The arrest and prosecution of James Kilgore, the last of the fugitive SLA members, represents the Department of Justice's commitment to bringing terrorists, be they domestic or foreign, to justice. We will never forget their acts, and the passage of time will not diminish our resolve or our vigilance."

After being extradited to the United States, Kilgore eventually pleaded guilty to both the possession of explosives charge and his deadly role in the bank robbery in Carmichael, during which unarmed mother of four, Myrna Opsahl, was killed while making a church deposit. He was sentenced to ten years in prison in California. After six and a half years, he was released on parole.

== Post-release ==
Since his release from prison in 2009, Kilgore has lived with his family in Champaign-Urbana, Illinois, where he has worked at the University of Illinois. He has also become active in local social justice campaigns such as Build Programs Not Jails. He has written a number of articles for online and print platforms such as The Chronicle of Higher Education, Truthout, Counterpunch, Dissent, Radical Teacher, and Critical Criminology.

He has carried out a research project on electronic monitoring in the criminal justice system, and was a keynote speaker on this topic at the 2014 Confederation of European Probation conference in Germany. His first non-fiction book, Understanding Mass Incarceration: A People's Guide to the Key Civil Rights Struggle of Our Time, was released by The New Press in August 2015.

Kilgore's employment status hit the headlines in the spring of 2014, when his criminal background was reported. The withdrawal of his employment offer prompted a protest from faculty members and beyond, while victims' advocates said Kilgore was never qualified to teach at the college level and forged his doctorate degree. More than 300 faculty members at the university signed a petition to have Kilgore's employment restored, and the American Association of University Professors wrote a letter of protest. In November 2014, the university's board of trustees again hired Kilgore. He began working after his wife hired him in January 2015 as a research scholar at the University of Illinois at Urbana-Champaign Center for African Studies.
