= Justine Wilkinson Washington =

American educator

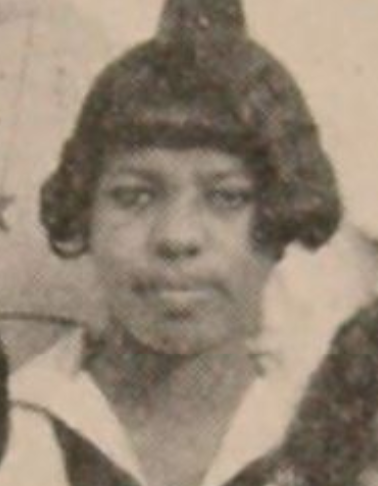
- Justine Wilkinson, from a 1928 Spelman College campus newspaper
- Born: Justine Wilkinson; May 8, 1908; Atlanta, Georgia
- Died: November 20, 2004 (age 96); Augusta, Georgia
- Occupation: Educator

Justine Wilkinson Washington (May 8, 1908 – November 20, 2004) was an American educator based in Augusta, Georgia. She was on the faculty of Paine College, was the first Black woman elected to the Richmond County Board of Education, and was appointed to the Georgia Human Relations Commission.

== Early life and education ==
Justine E. Wilkinson was born in Atlanta and raised in Athens, Georgia, the daughter of Charles Wilkinson and Julia Foster Wilkinson. Her father was a clergyman. Her first cousin, Marcus A. Foster, was a school superintendent in Oakland, California, where he was killed by the Symbionese Liberation Army in 1973.

Wilkinson earned a bachelor's degree from Spelman College in 1930; at Spelman, she was in the glee club, and was social editor of the campus newspaper. She earned a master's degree in 1948 from Atlanta University with a master's thesis titled "A Study of Some Personality Traits, Adjustments, and Educational Aptitudes of 168 Negro Teachers in Aiken County, South Carolina". In 1965, she completed a D.Ed. degree at the University of Oklahoma. Her dissertation was titled "Self-concepts and socio-economic status of Negroes enrolled in grade six in public schools of Richmond County, Georgia".

== Career ==
Wilkinson taught school and conducted choirs in her hometown, at Union Institute, after college. She also taught in Belton, South Carolina and Pendleton, South Carolina, and at summer institutes for teachers. She was appointed a Jeanes Supervisor of Teachers in Aiken County, in charge of 84 segregated rural schools. She encouraged teachers to become involved in improving the communities where they taught, and to keep their classrooms orderly as an example to their students.

She taught education and psychology courses at Paine College in Augusta, Georgia, from 1961 to 1963, and from 1965 until her retirement in 1981. In 1972, after an unsuccessful campaign in 1964, Washington became the first Black woman elected to the Richmond County Board of Education, and she remained a board member for 21 years, and served as the board's president. In 1986 she was appointed to Georgia's State Job Training Coordinating Council. She also served on the Georgia Human Relations Commission from 1992 to 1994. In 1995, she was honored with a Lifetime Achievement Award in Education by the Metro Augusta Chamber of Commerce.

== Personal life ==
Wilkinson married fellow educator Isaiah Edward "Ike" Washington on Christmas Day in 1940; as they later explained, for two teachers, Christmas Day was their best chance for a day off work. The Washingtons were executors of the estate of their friend, actress Butterfly McQueen, when she died in 1995. Ike Washington died in 2000, and she died in 2004, at the age of 96, in Augusta. Washington Hall at Augusta University was named for her and her husband in 1997.
