= Angela Atwood =

American criminal (1949–1974)

- Born: Angela DeAngelis Atwood; February 6, 1949; North Haledon, New Jersey, U.S.
- Died: May 17, 1974 (aged 25); Los Angeles, California, U.S.
- Other names: Angel; General Gelina; Anne Lindberg
- Education: Indiana University Bloomington
- Movement: Symbionese Liberation Army (SLA)
- Spouse: Gary Atwood

Angela DeAngelis Atwood (February 6, 1949 – May 17, 1974), also known as General Gelina, was a founding member of the Symbionese Liberation Army (SLA), an American far-left urban guerrilla group which kidnapped Patty Hearst and robbed banks. She was killed, along with five other SLA members, in a nationally televised shootout with the Los Angeles Police Department (LAPD).

== Background ==
Angela DeAngelis Atwood was born on February 6, 1949, and grew up in the small New Jersey suburb of North Haledon near Paterson. The daughter of a local Teamsters official, DeAngelis was active in many student leadership groups and was captain of the cheerleading squad. She starred in many school musicals and quietly tutored and befriended classmates others ignored. She was voted Most School Spirit by her peers while attending Manchester Regional High School.

At Indiana University Bloomington, she met leftwing activist, theatre student and future husband Gary Atwood. While at school she sang in the Kappa Pickers (a musical group in the Kappa Kappa Gamma sorority) with Jane Pauley, was involved in theater, and majored in education.

She helped fellow theater student Kevin Kline organize and run a guerrilla theatre group in town. She married Atwood while still an undergraduate, and they befriended William Harris, another Indiana University actor, and his wife Emily. She graduated in 1970 and began student teaching in Indianapolis.

== Symbionese Liberation Army (SLA) ==
The Atwoods moved to San Francisco, where Angela became friends with Kathleen Soliah (now known as Sara Jane Olson). The two women acted together in a local production of Henrik Ibsen's Hedda Gabler and Angela got Kathy a job waiting tables. They quit the job together when the manager told them to wear revealing outfits to build up the lunch crowd.

Angela and Gary Atwood separated in June 1973. She moved in with the Harrises in early December 1973. She then joined the Symbionese Liberation Army (SLA) along with the Harrises. Atwood was described as well dressed, with a preference for hippie attire, particularly Indian silk shirts and batik. Atwood liked such feminine accessories as earrings, jewelry, and rings. A friend described her as "the prima donna of the whole thing", and likened her to the woman depicted by Bob Dylan in "Just Like a Woman".

Atwood (speaking as "Gelina") was often the voice of the SLA, in the form of tape-recorded press releases. In Patty Hearst's account of her time with the SLA, she writes that Gelina would spend hours, and sometimes days, perfecting communiques. SLA members held an anti-bourgeois ideology of popular rule partly based on the idea that the most oppressed members of society, often blacks, must be the ones to lead a revolution against The Establishment. Patty Hearst testified that Atwood, William Harris, and Nancy Ling Perry were given to bemoaning their white skin and wishing they were black. According to Hearst's testimony, SLA members also envied persons like their black leader Field Marshal Cinque (pronounced sin-q) (Donald DeFreeze), who had served time in prison. This partly explained their allegiance to Cinque. Atwood, however, many times disagreed with his directives, as when she argued against his issuing a death warrant for two imprisoned SLA members.

Atwood was assigned the task of surveillance in the potential kidnapping of John E. Countryman, former chairman of the board of Del Monte Corporation. The surveillance plan gave Countryman's age as 70. Atwood was apparently unaware that Countryman had died in July 1972 at the age of 69.

Atwood used the name Anne Lindberg when she visited inmate James Harold ("Doc") Holiday on January 10, 1974. This encounter alerted Holiday to the capture of Joe Remiro and Russ Little, who were both linked through strong circumstantial evidence to the murder of Marcus Foster, Superintendent of the Oakland Unified School District in Oakland, California. They were arrested following a shootout with policemen in Concord, California. Quickly after Atwood's approach of Holiday, she fled the Oakland home with the Harrises. They left behind clothes, a stereo, personal papers, and three pistol boxes.

== Prominent role in Hearst kidnapping ==
In her trial for armed robbery, Hearst testified that she was kidnapped from her Berkeley, California apartment by Atwood, Donald DeFreeze, and William Harris, on the night of February 4, 1974.

Hearst's insistence that she was forced by the SLA to make a series of self-incriminating statements was supported by Dr. Margaret Thaler-Singer, a UC Berkeley clinical psychologist. As an expert on speech patterns who studied the tapes released by the SLA, Thaler-Singer stated that the speech patterns did not fit the style of Hearst. Rather they resembled the styles of Atwood and Emily Harris.

Atwood's voice is heard on a taped message of March 9, 1974, used in negotiations with Randolph Hearst for the return of Patty Hearst. Atwood assumed the voice of a black woman and said, "The dream - and indeed it is a dream - that the enemy corporate state will willingly give the stolen riches of the earth back to the people and that this will be accomplished through compromising talk and empty words . . . to this, our bullets scream loudly. The enemy's bloodthirsty greed will be destroyed by the growing spirit of the people and their thirst for freedom. We call upon the people to judge for themselves whether our tactics of waging struggle are correct or incorrect in fighting the enemy by any means necessary."

Prosecution witness Dr. Joel Fort identified Atwood, Perry, and Willie Wolfe as the SLA members Hearst developed the "most affectionate bonds" with.

== Death in Los Angeles safehouse shootout ==
Atwood, along with five other founding members of the SLA, including Donald DeFreeze, was killed in Los Angeles on May 17, 1974, in a shootout with police that was broadcast live on television. Atwood died of burns and smoke inhalation when the SLA's safehouse caught fire during the gun battle and burned to the ground. It was Atwood's death that prompted Kathleen Soliah to hold a memorial service for her and the other deceased members of the SLA; Soliah and a few others became part of the "second team", giving the SLA life for about two more years.

== Eulogy ==
Atwood was eulogized by the Rev. Joseph Citro, a 25-year-old priest, at her funeral mass in Prospect Park, New Jersey, on May 26, 1974. They grew up blocks from each other and knew each other through the local Catholic Youth Organization. In an interview the day after the mass, Citro stated that "we must enable these young people to make basic changes in society or more girls like Angela will have to suffer." Atwood is buried in Holy Sepulchre Cemetery in Totowa, New Jersey.

== Sources ==
- Hearst, Patricia; Moscow, Alvin (1982). Every Secret Thing. Doubleday.
- McClellan, Vin; Avery, Paul (1977). The Voices of Guns. G.P. Putnam's Sons. ISBN 9780399117381.
- Toobin, Jeffrey (2016). American Heiress: The Wild Saga of the Kidnapping, Crimes and Trial of Patty Hearst. Knopf Doubleday Publishing Group. ISBN 978-0385536714.
