= Patricia Soltysik =

American criminal (1950–1974)

- Born: May 17, 1950; Goleta, California, United States
- Died: May 17, 1974 (aged 24); Los Angeles, California, United States
- Other names: Mizmoon, Zoya, Pat
- Movement: Symbionese Liberation Army

Patricia Monique Soltysik (May 17, 1950 – May 17, 1974) was an American woman who was best known as a co-founder and activist in the Symbionese Liberation Army, a far-left militant group based in Berkeley and Oakland, California. She participated in the group's violent activities, including armed bank robbery.

She was one of six SLA members who died in Los Angeles in May 1974, during a shootout with the Los Angeles Police Department. The house where the members had gone to ground accidentally caught fire. Donald DeFreeze committed suicide by gunshot before the fire engulfed him. Camilla Hall and Nancy Ling Perry were fatally shot by police while leaving the house and brandishing pistols.

According to later testimony by Patty Hearst, who had been kidnapped by the SLA in 1974 and later joined them, Soltysik was responsible for killing Marcus Foster, the Black Superintendent of Oakland Public Schools, in November 1973.

== Early life and education ==
Patricia's father was a pharmacist. She had two older brothers and was the third of seven children, and the eldest of five girls. She grew up in Goleta, California. Soltysik graduated from Dos Pueblos High School in 1968 in the top 10 percent of her class, where she was elected student body treasurer.

In 1968 she gained a state scholarship and enrolled in the University of California, Berkeley. While at Berkeley she became embittered by the "Bloody Thursday" incident in 1971 in which police killed a protester. Drifting into leftist groups, she became a radical feminist and self-avowed revolutionary.

In 1971 Soltysik attached herself to the radical ex-convict group United Prisoners Union and dropped out of college. She and her neighbor, Camilla Hall, a former social worker and painter, became lovers in what was Hall's first lesbian relationship. Hall nicknamed Soltysik as "Mizmoon."

== Founding of SLA ==
On March 5, 1973, Donald DeFreeze escaped from Soledad prison. He sought refuge in Oakland with white friends from the Black Cultural Association (BCA), whom he had met earlier while incarcerated at Vacaville Prison. Russ Little and Willie Wolfe took him to Soltysik's house in Oakland. She had not been part of the prisoner outreach program conducted at Vacaville by UC Berkeley volunteers, so they thought that law enforcement would not look there for DeFreeze. DeFreeze lived with Soltysik for several months, and the two became lovers.

Soltysik and DeFreeze are thought to have co-written the first SLA literature. Soltysik and Nancy Ling Perry, another white woman, are considered by some analysts and reporters to have been the main theorists and drivers of the SLA. As noted, Soltysik and DeFreeze co-wrote SLA literature. DeFreeze has been described as a simple man, and may have been a figurehead.

Researchers have strongly suggested that he started working as an informant for the Los Angeles Police Department in 1967. They believe this is why his probation was extended, although he had been picked up on weapons charges well before he was sentenced to Vacaville prison for 5 years to life. He was later transferred to Soledad for good behavior. Evidence suggests that DeFreeze acted as an agent provocateur for the LAPD, and had been encouraged to join or catalyze radical activists in the Berkeley area. While living in Oakland, he seemed to have ready access to illegal weapons and explosives, and would sell them to radical groups.

Most of the early SLA members were drawn from a group that encountered DeFreeze at Vacaville, where they first met as Berkeley volunteers to the Black Cultural Association. Most of the SLA members were white, but Joe Remiro was Chicano, and Thero Wheeler was Black and a former member of the Black Panthers. The relationships were complex, as DeFreeze was sexually involved with three of the women. Wheeler left the group as he disagreed with its plans to embrace violent tactics.

On November 6, 1973, in Oakland, California, three SLA "soldiers" fatally shot Dr. Marcus Foster, Superintendent of Public Schools, and badly wounded his deputy Robert Blackburn. The men were attacked as they left an Oakland school board meeting. Mistakenly believing that Foster supported the introduction of identification cards into Oakland schools, the SLA condemned him as "fascist", but he had opposed this measure and gotten agreement from the school board not to do it.

Patty Hearst, who joined the group after being kidnapped by them in early 1974, testified later that Soltysik and Emily Harris, another white woman who had joined the SLA and became sexually involved with DeFreeze, were the two assailants who had shot Foster and Blackburn. Another account says that DeFreeze shot and wounded Blackburn.

Joe Remiro and Russ Little were arrested in January 1974 after an armed confrontation with police in Concord, California, near where other members were staying at a house rented under a false name by Nancy Ling Perry. They were convicted and sentenced to prison on charges related to the Foster killing.

== L.A. shootout and death ==
Soltysik was one of the six SLA members killed in Los Angeles in a shootout with the Los Angeles Police Department on May 17, 1974. It was her 24th birthday. In the armed confrontation the house was accidentally set on fire. The SLA members initially took shelter beneath the floor of the house in a crawl space. She died from smoke inhalation, burn injuries, and several LAPD gunshot wounds as the house burned down around her.
