= Lake Headley =

American private detective and writer

Lake Wellington Headley (August 31, 1930 – May 15, 1992) was an American private detective and writer who made a name for himself by being hired to investigate high-profile crimes. Crimes included the Wounded Knee incident, Patty Hearst kidnapping, court-martial of Clayton Lonetree, the murder of Vicki Morgan, and the Don Bolles car bombing. In a series of true crime books, Headley wrote about his investigations.

== Early life and career ==
Lake Headley was born in Indiana. He attended Goshen High School in Indiana. In the yearbook for 1948, at around age 16, he stated that he wished to be a lawyer.

He began his career as a police officer in Las Vegas, but his killing of a suspect when a young officer prompted him to quit policing and become a p.i. In 1962, he left the force, where he was a detective, to become one of the first private detectives in Las Vegas. He went on to work for thirty years in the field, and was considered one of the best. Los Angeles prosecutor Vincent Bugliosi called Headley "the best private investigator on earth."

== Patty Hearst and the SLA ==
During the Patty Hearst kidnapping saga, two of the families of SLA members, including Willie Wolfe's father, contracted Headley to investigate the matter.

Headley concluded his investigation, and filed a sworn affidavit of his findings. Among these included:

That Patricia Campbell Hearst and her parents disagreed bitterly over Patricia's political and personal relations. That a love affair between a black man and Patricia Hearst did take place prior to her relationship with her fiancé Steven Weed. That Mrs. Randolph A. Hearst subjected her daughter to extreme pressure to change her personal and political relationships.

On May 4, 1974, Headley, along with freelance writer Donald Freed, held a press conference in San Francisco. They presented 400 pages of documentation of their findings, some of which included:

- a year before the kidnapping Patty Hearst had visited convict, Donald DeFreeze, who later became the SLA's figurehead.
- DeFreeze's arrest records;
- the work of Colston Westbrook with Los Angeles Police Department's CCS (Criminal Conspiracy Section) and the State of California's Sacramento-based CII (Criminal Identification and Investigation) unit.; and
- evidence of links of the CIA to Police Departments.

On May 17, 1974, The New York Times ran the story of DeFreeze and the Los Angeles Police Department. However, the story was largely overlooked due to this being the day of the shoot out and conflagration that killed DeFreeze and five other members of the SLA.

In a book he co-wrote with freelance writer, William Hoffman, Vegas P.I.: The Life and Times of America's Greatest Detective, he presented well-documented evidence that Donald DeFreeze, was a police informant and an agent provocateur.

Headley also uncovered evidence that, in the house fire in LA that killed six members of the SLA, at least one of the suspects was shot in the back while trying to surrender.

== Family life ==
Headley's wife was Terri Lee Yoder. She was originally his assistant and they married in 1981.

== Death ==
Headley died of amyotrophic lateral sclerosis in 1992.

== See also ==
- Clayton J. Lonetree
- Don Bolles

== Bibliography ==
- 1994 Contract Killer (published posthumously)
- 1993 Vegas P.I.: The Life and Times of America's Greatest Detective, with William Hoffman (published posthumously)
- 1990 Loud and Clear, with William Hoffman.
- 1989 The Court-Martial of Clayton Lonetree, with William Hoffman.
