= Donald DeFreeze =

Leader of the Symbionese Liberation Army (1943–1974)

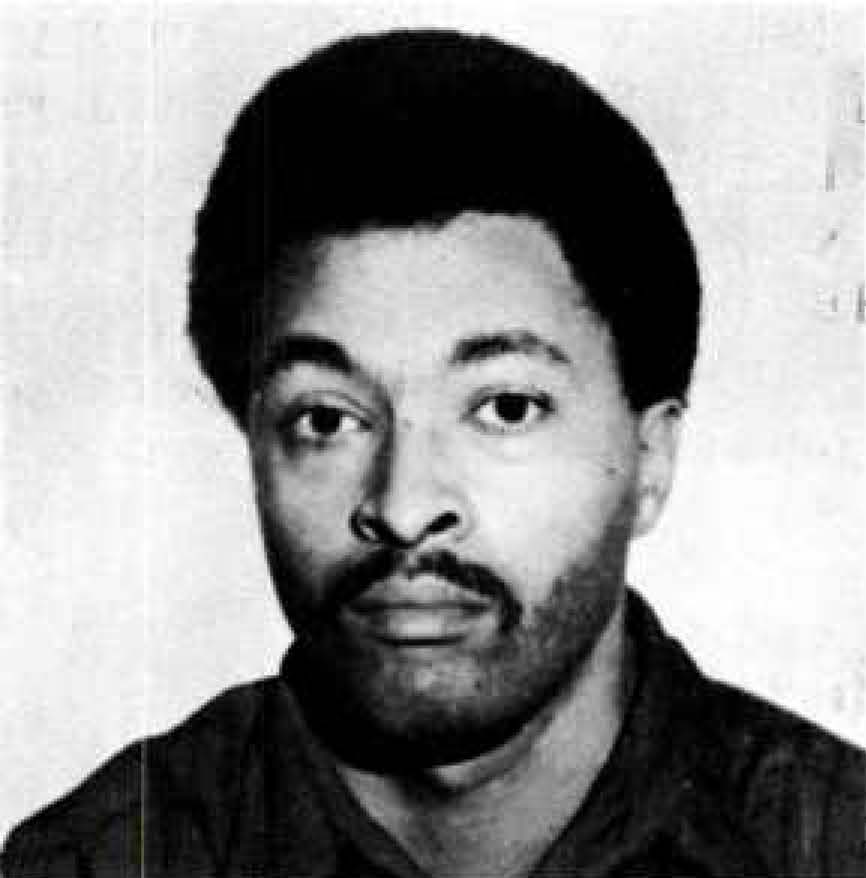
- Mugshot from 1973
- Born: Donald David DeFreeze; November 16, 1943; Cleveland, Ohio, U.S.
- Died: May 17, 1974 (aged 30); Los Angeles, California, U.S.
- Cause of death: Suicide by gunshot
- Other names: Field Marshal Cinque, Cinque Mtume
- Movement: Symbionese Liberation Army (SLA)

Donald David DeFreeze (November 16, 1943 – May 17, 1974), also known as Cinque Mtume and using the nom de guerre "General Field Marshal Cinque", was an American man involved with the far-left radical group Symbionese Liberation Army (SLA) and convicted criminal.

DeFreeze's exact role within the Symbionese Liberation Army is unclear, but analysts have suggested he was either a figurehead or an indirect leader. Born and raised in Cleveland, Ohio, DeFreeze dropped out of high school and had a criminal record from the age of fourteen. He received probation in the late 1960s, leading some sources to suggest he was serving as a police informant to the Los Angeles Police Department (LAPD).

He and several associates began to make plans for armed action that they believed would rouse the African-American community and attract more recruits. Three SLA soldiers fatally shot Marcus Foster, the superintendent of public schools in Oakland, California, the first African-American superintendent of any major public school system, and wounded his deputy. They mistakenly believed he supported a program of student IDs. Two members of the SLA were arrested in January 1974, convicted and sentenced to prison for the crimes.

DeFreeze and co-conspirators next kidnapped heiress Patty Hearst in February 1974, seeking a ransom and media attention for their cause. Three months later, during a shootout with law enforcement in Los Angeles, DeFreeze committed suicide by gunshot when he and five SLA members resisted a police raid in a burning house.

A private investigation before the raid suggested that DeFreeze may have been a police informant and agent provocateur from before the founding days of the SLA. His remains were returned to his native Cleveland, where the funeral was organized at his family's request.

== Early life ==
DeFreeze was born in Cleveland, Ohio, to Louis and Mary DeFreeze; he was the oldest of eight children. His mother was a registered nurse at a convalescent home. His father was a violent man who punished DeFreeze frequently; he broke both of the boy's arms three times when he was a child.

DeFreeze dropped out of school in the ninth grade at age 14 and ran away from home. He moved to Buffalo, New York, where he lived with the Rev. William L. Foster, a fundamentalist minister, and his family. He became a street gang member in Buffalo. The Rev. Foster would say of him later:

He was a get up and go kid... he had a heart that was as big as a house. But some of the boys he used to hang around with, I didn't care for. You just knew they were 99 and 44/100 percent bad.

In his first brush with the law, DeFreeze was arrested for stealing from parking meters and stealing a car. He was sent to the state reformatory in Elmira, New York, which later became Elmira Correctional Facility. In 1970, DeFreeze wrote of his time there, which he called a prison or a mental institution:

Life in the prison, as we called it, was nothing, but fear and hate, day in and day out... I would not be part of any of the gangs, black or white... I didn't hate anyone, black or white, and they hated me for it.

Following his release, DeFreeze moved to the Newark, New Jersey area. In 1963, at the age of 20, he married Gloria Thomas, who had three children from a previous marriage. DeFreeze and Thomas had a total of three children together. In 1964 his wife had him arrested for desertion.

They reconciled. After having some gun charges dropped, in 1965 DeFreeze moved with his family from the Northeast to California, where they settled in Los Angeles. He said that the worries of trying to support the children engulfed him. He wrote, "I just couldn't take it anymore. I was slowly becoming a nothing".

== Prior arrests, warnings and probations ==
During his period away from his family, in 1964, police stopped DeFreeze while he was hitchhiking on the San Bernardino Freeway near West Covina, California. They found him carrying a tear-gas pencil bomb, a sharpened butter knife, and a sawed-off rifle in his suitcase.

In 1965, having returned to Newark, DeFreeze was arrested for firing a gun in the basement of his home. "I started playing with guns and fireworks," he would later write. "Just anything to get away from life and how unhappy I was." The charges were dropped and DeFreeze took his family to California.

In 1967, the police stopped DeFreeze for running a red light on his bicycle. The police said that when they searched him, they found a homemade bomb in his pocket. The bicycle basket held another bomb and a pistol. DeFreeze said he had found them and was trying to sell them because of his family's needs. He was given three years of probation. The probation officer who interviewed DeFreeze wrote that the youth was "deeply troubled by this case."

In recommending probation, the officer said:

...The difficulties which the defendant has encountered in his life are real and serious. He feels his responsibilities deeply and is overcome when he cannot meet them. He appears to have a warm relationship with his wife and children... The type of behavior encountered in the present offense appears to be the defendant's way of compensating for feelings of inadequacy and powerlessness... The defendant is potentially dangerous if he again encounters such severely threatening circumstances as he was encountering at the time of the offense.

An early probation report described DeFreeze as, "a schizoid personality with strong schizophrenic potential" who had "a fascination with firearms and explosives." Psychiatric officials at the prison testing center where he was briefly sent recommended that he be jailed "because his fascination with firearms and explosives made him dangerous." Despite these recommendations, he was given a further five years probation.

In 1969, DeFreeze and an accomplice were arrested in New Jersey for the kidnapping of a caretaker of a synagogue. His accomplice was tried and acquitted. A memorandum from the prosecutor's office said that they decided to drop charges against DeFreeze since by the time of trial, he was jailed in California.

On October 11, 1969, Cleveland, Ohio, police spotted DeFreeze on the roof of a bank carrying two pistols and an 8-inch dagger. Police said they found a burglar's tool kit and a hand grenade nearby. He paid the $5,000 bond money and then left for Los Angeles.

== Imprisonment and the Black Cultural Association ==
On November 17, 1969, DeFreeze was injured in a gun battle with police outside a bank in Los Angeles. He was convicted in 1970 of having stolen a $1,000 negotiable cashier's check and was sentenced to 6-to-14 years; he was sent to Vacaville Prison.

While incarcerated at Vacaville Prison, DeFreeze joined the Black Cultural Association (BCA), intended as an educational group to help prepare prisoners for return to general society. He became known as a dynamic member. Started in 1968, the group began to operate at Vacaville in 1969. Colston Westbrook, a grad student and later professor who taught African-American studies at the University of California, Berkeley, became involved in recruiting Berkeley students to visit Vacaville as volunteers to BCA. They helped lead educational and political discussions. People from outside the university also attended BCA events, especially related cultural programs.

Through this organization, DeFreeze met with Willie Wolfe, a white Berkeley student who was taking Westbrook's course. Wolfe also persuaded white friends Russ Little and Robyn Steiner to volunteer through the BCA. Wolfe, Little, and DeFreeze are thought to have introduced more political radicalism to the group.

DeFreeze set up a separate small group, called Unisight. He invited radicals Wolfe and Little to join. In addition, inmate Thero Wheeler, a former Black Panther, jailhouse lawyer, and self-taught Marxist, also joined the group. Willie Wolfe has been credited in some accounts as the catalyst for forming the Symbionese Liberation Army.

In December 1972 DeFreeze was transferred to Soledad Prison in Soledad, California for good behavior.

== Escape ==
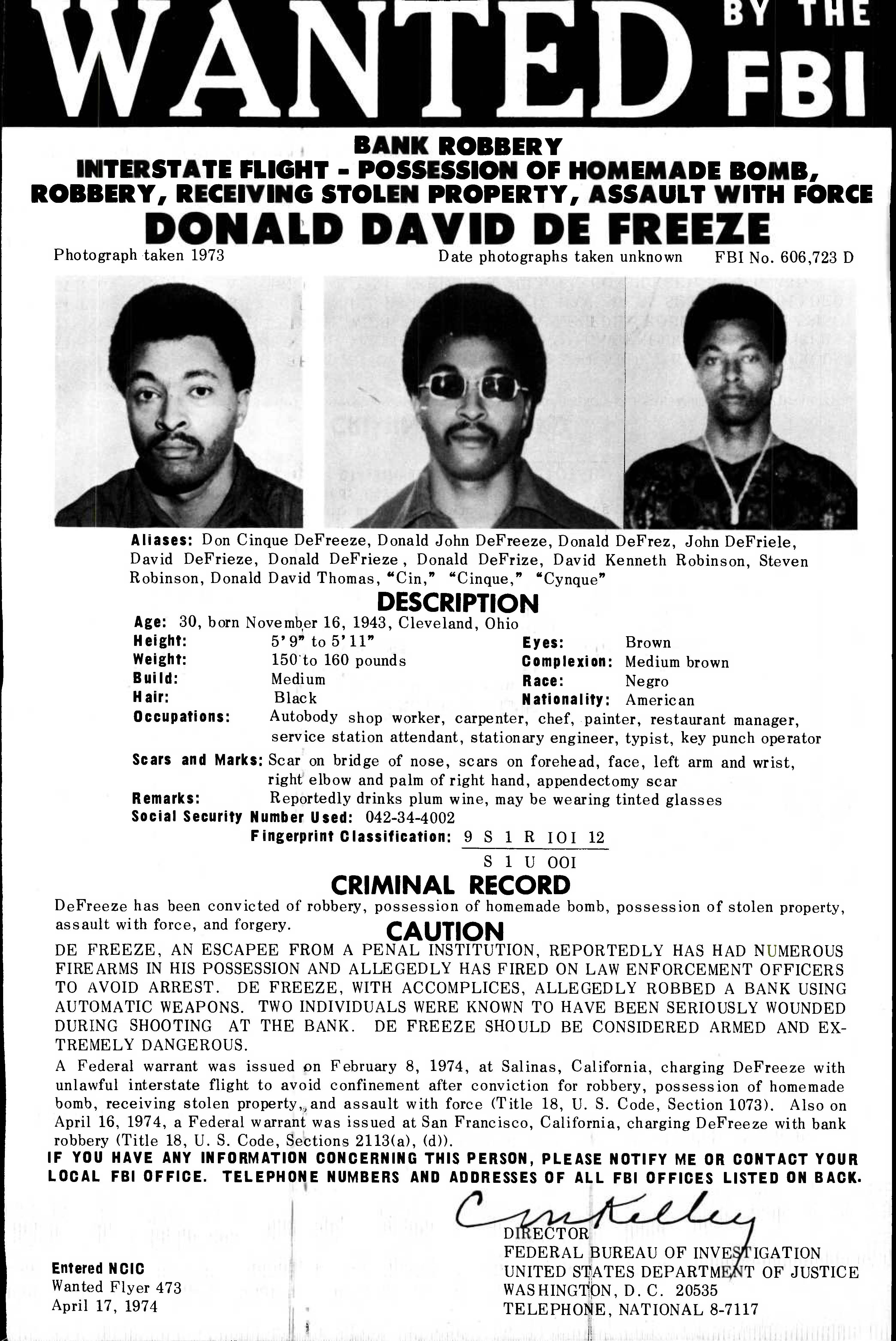
An FBI wanted poster for DeFreeze from April 1974

DeFreeze escaped from Soledad Prison on March 5, 1973. He made his way over to Oakland, California, where he was hidden by white friends from the Vacaville BCA. He was taken to the house of Patricia "Mizmoon" Soltysik, with whom he lived for several months. Through Soltysik, DeFreeze met Camilla Hall, a white Berkeley artist and former social worker. The two women had an established lesbian relationship, and DeFreeze eventually had relations with each of them. Later he was also sexually involved with SLA member Emily Harris, after she and her husband William decided to have an open marriage.

== SLA ==
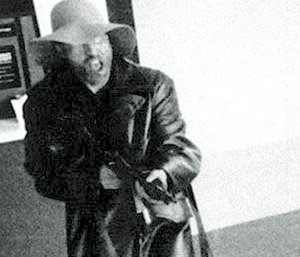
FBI file photo showing DeFreeze robbing the Hibernia bank in San Francisco on April 15, 1974

DeFreeze and Soltysik co-founded the Symbionese Liberation Army, and soon recruited members for the group. DeFreeze adopted the name General Field Marshal Cinque (which he pronounced "SINK-you", though this is not how the name is historically pronounced). He took the name from Joseph Cinqué, a captive Mende who reportedly led the slave rebellion that took over the Spanish slave ship Amistad in 1839; the Africans regained their freedom following a United States Supreme Court case. He adopted the surname Mtume from the Swahili word for "prophet".

By late summer SLA members included Joe Remiro, a Vietnam veteran and activist who was a friend of Little and Wolfe. As DeFreeze's circle of acquaintances widened, he also came to know Angela Atwood, 25. She and her husband had moved to the Bay Area from Indiana along with William and Emily Harris. All had moved from Bloomington, where they knew each other at university. The Atwoods separated that year, and Angela lived with the Harrises.

After acquiring arms, the group perpetrated a number of crimes, the most infamous being the November 1973 murder of Oakland Schools Superintendent Marcus Foster, a black candidate for mayor of the city. DeFreeze was a suspect in the shooting of Foster's deputy, Assistant Superintendent Robert Blackburn, who was seriously wounded in the attack. The SLA provoked outrage in the black community by their assassination of Foster, an admired public figure who was the first black superintendent of any major public school system.

In February 1974 they kidnapped newspaper heiress Patty Hearst in Berkeley. They first sought an exchange and release of political prisoners. When that was refused, they told her to ask her father for a ransom enough to feed the poor people.

On April 15, 1974 they robbed the Hibernia Bank in San Francisco of $10,000. Both Hearst and DeFreeze were captured on security videos that showed them brandishing weapons.

== Informant allegations ==
At an earlier probation hearing, defense attorney Morgan M. Morten said that it had been "indicated that [DeFreeze] had been cooperating with the police".

When Willie Wolfe's father, Dr. Wolfe, learned of his son's involvement in the SLA, he hired private detective Lake Headley, to provide him with more information. On May 4, 1974, thirteen days before the younger Wolfe's death with DeFreeze and others in a shootout and fire, Headley and freelance writer Donald Freed held a press conference in San Francisco. They presented 400 pages of documentation of their findings, some of which included evidence that, a year before the kidnapping, Patty Hearst had visited DeFreeze in prison.

Lake Headley also provided evidence for the following:

=== DeFreeze's arrest records ===
Records showed that DeFreeze had set up the arrest of an associate in a case involving a stolen gun. The Los Angeles Police Department officer who handled the case became a key intelligence officer who handled informants related to black militants.

According to Headley's research, police records showed that between 1967 and 1969, DeFreeze was given probation despite a series of adverse encounters with the police, which related to charges for illegal possession of weapons and explosives. These included arrest for possession of weapons, a kidnapping charge in New Jersey, an attempted bank robbery in Cleveland, and a gunfight with Los Angeles police and bank guards.

On March 10, 1968, DeFreeze was charged with burglary in Inglewood, California. There was no disposition of the charges. On August 16, 1968, he was charged with stealing a motorcycle. There was no disposition. His probation was modified, on December 13, 1968, to forbid possession of firearms or bombs. On March 20, 1969, he was picked up with a loaded 9-millimeter semiautomatic rifle with 32 rounds in the magazine. There was no disposition.

=== BCA contact worked with LAPD unit targeting radicals/DeFreeze a possible LAPD informant ===
Evidence showed that Colston Westbrook, a professor and the BCA's main contact at UC Berkeley, had worked closely with the Los Angeles Police Department's Criminal Conspiracy Section (CCS) and the State of California's Sacramento-based CII (Criminal Identification and Investigation) unit. This was during the same period when DeFreeze was receiving unusually lenient treatment and extended probation from the Los Angeles County criminal justice system. Headley suggested this implied that DeFreeze was working as an informant.

On May 17, 1974, The New York Times ran the story about Dr. Wolfe's investigation and Headley's report with some of this information. But the major story that day was the LAPD shootout at the SLA house, which was engulfed by an accidental fire. DeFreeze was found to have committed suicide by gunshot; two SLA members were fatally shot by police when they left the house; two others died of smoke and fire.

Investigator Lake Headley presented additional evidence that Donald DeFreeze was a police informant and an agent provocateur in his book Vegas P.I.: The Life and Times of America's Greatest Detective (1993), co-written with freelance writer William Hoffman. He also concluded that the Black Cultural Association was used by law enforcement to monitor radicals among both Berkeley students and prison inmates. Upon meeting radicals after his prison escape, DeFreeze was known for his eagerness to sell them firearms, explosives, and related items. Some of his contacts were suspicious that he was trying to set up sting operations. His means of acquiring weaponry has remained unexplained.

=== CIA assassination squad theories ===
Headley's work has been interpreted to suggest that the Symbionese Liberation Army (SLA) was a CIA-controlled assassination squad, with the Black Panther Party as its main target. The theory states that the SLA originated within California prisons and was actively recruited by authorities. It also claims that the assassination of Oakland Schools Superintendent Marcus Foster was approved by the squad's handlers, and that the squad was eliminated in the 1974 Los Angeles shootout because their operation security had been compromised.

== Death ==
On May 17, 1974, the Los Angeles Police Department tracked DeFreeze and five other SLA members to a house at 1466 East 54th Street; they surrounded it and demanded that occupants surrender. An elderly man and a child were allowed out of the house. Following that, police fired a tear gas canister through a window, which the SLA answered with bursts of automatic weapons fire. During the shootout the police were outgunned by the SLA's automatic weapons, and the SLA's gas masks rendered the tear gas ineffective. But the house caught fire during the shootout, possibly from an outdoor-type combusting tear gas canister or due to ignition by the officers.

DeFreeze and five others made their way into a crawlspace beneath the house, where they continued to fire at police. A canister exploded and the house caught fire. As it burned, Nancy Ling Perry and Camilla Hall left the house, brandishing pistols according to police, and were fatally shot. DeFreeze was found to have committed suicide by shooting himself in the right side of his head with a pistol before succumbing to the fire. Angela Atwood, Willie Wolfe and Patricia Soltysik, still in the crawlspace, may have died of smoke inhalation before the flames reached them.

== Funeral and burial ==
DeFreeze's body was returned to family in Cleveland. They asked members of the Sunni Muslim sect to organize and conduct the funeral, which was held in the chapel of a funeral home. Some 500 attended, with another 1500 persons gathered outside. His younger brother Delano DeFreeze said that his brother had "lived for the people" and "died for the people". The family had appealed to revolutionaries to come to the funeral, but none were observed there.

DeFreeze was buried in Highland Park Cemetery in Highland Hills, Ohio.

== References in media ==
Stephen King said in notes to his book Danse Macabre (1981), that DeFreeze was one of the inspirations for his recurring character Randall Flagg:

I sat there for another fifteen minutes or so, listening to the Eagles on my little cassette player, and then I wrote: Donald DeFreeze is a dark man." He first referred to him in his book The Stand.

DeFreeze is mentioned in King's post-apocalyptic novel The Stand as an acquaintance of Randall Flagg, the book's main antagonist; it is implied that Flagg was involved in Hearst's kidnapping.

DeFreeze and the SLA are referred to in the 1976 film Network. A television show is purportedly created that uses members of a fictional version of the SLA as the stars.

Paul Schrader's 1988 film Patty Hearst features DeFreeze played by Ving Rhames.

The Camper Van Beethoven song "Tania" from Our Beloved Revolutionary Sweetheart refers to DeFreeze by his nom de guerre "Field Marshal Cinque" in the lyrics "A Polaroid of you, Cinque/With a seven-headed dragon/In a house in Daly City".

DeFreeze and the SLA are discussed in David Talbot's 2012 book about San Francisco in the 1960s and 1970s, "Season of the Witch", which treats as credible the theory that DeFreeze was secretly working with the authorities.
