= Venceremos (political organization) =

American far-left political organization

- Flag used by Venceremos in their statements
- Founder: Aaron Manganiello
- Dates active: 1969–1973
- Headquarters: Palo Alto, California
- Ideology: Chicanismo; Marxism-Leninism-Maoism; Anti-racism; Anti-fascism; Anti-imperialism; Anti-capitalism; New Communism
- Political position: Far-left
- Part of: The New Communist and Chicano Movements

Venceremos (pronounced [benseˈɾemos]; Spanish for 'We shall win') was an American far-left political group active in the Palo Alto, California area from 1969 to 1973. It has been described as being part of the New Communist movement. Stanford professor H. Bruce Franklin was one of its leaders. Its membership was initially largely Latino, but came to include more White people after Franklin joined in 1971.

Venceremos engaged in a number of different activities, including prison outreach, running for office, holding weekly rallies, and speaking at local government meetings. Militant in outlook, they viewed revolution through protracted guerrilla warfare as their long-term goal. They were monitored by the House Internal Security Committee and the FBI. In 1972 members of Venceremos killed a federal prison guard while helping an inmate escape from custody. Some members were convicted of murder, and the group dissolved shortly thereafter.

== Beginnings ==
The organization was founded in 1966 by Aaron Manganiello (a former Brown Beret) as a largely Latino left-wing group; it evolved to an increasingly Maoist/Communist group. In 1971 they were joined by a faction of the Maoist Revolutionary Union (RU), led by H. Bruce Franklin, a Stanford University English professor. More White people joined the organization during this period. Franklin was fired in 1972 on charges of violating his commitment to the university by "inciting to riot."

== Activities ==
Venceremos and Franklin favored a militant strategy based on protracted urban guerrilla warfare. According to Franklin, "... these collectives had been heavily involved in youth organizing within white proletarian communities, in factory organizing and in anti-imperialist struggles on the campuses. [...] The new combined organization was multi-national, extremely diversified in its activities and base, and quite militant."

Venceremos publicly advocated armed self-defense by the citizenry, community control of the police, and reform of the prison system. To these ends, the group's members engaged in a number of legal activities, such as working to educate prisoners and defend Vietnam War protesters. The organization's ultimate stated goal was the overthrow of the government. In 1970, Venceremos opened its own community college in a Redwood City storefront; it operated for two years before running out of money. The House Committee on Internal Security considered Venceremos a serious political threat, as described in its 202-page report America's Maoists: the Revolutionary Union, the Venceremos Organization (1972). They were also a target of the FBI's COINTELPRO program.

Venceremos members often participated in City Council and School Board meetings in Palo Alto with a verbal aggressiveness rarely seen before in the city's politics. Member Jeffrey Youdelman was known for offensive shouting down of council members and presenting petitions for radical left causes. Venceremos members ran for local office in Palo Alto, including Jean Hobson and Youdelman who unsuccessfully ran for City Council in 1971 and 1973, respectively. Doug Garrett ran for the School Board.

During this period, Venceremos held weekly rallies at Lytton Plaza in Palo Alto, which they dubbed "The People's Plaza." In May 1971, Venceremos's Easter Division drifted away from the center and began organizing through the United Farm Workers union.

== Beaty escape and aftermath ==
On October 6, 1972 a small group of Venceremos members assisted in the escape of a federal prisoner, resulting in the death of a prison guard. Member Jean Hobson had been romantically linked to federal prison inmate Ronald Beaty, who was incarcerated at Chino Prison. She and other Venceremos members made a plan to achieve Beaty's escape. According to police and Beaty, who became the prosecution's star witness, two unarmed prison guards were taking Beaty to a court appearance in San Bernardino when their vehicle was ambushed near Chino. 23-year-old Venceremos member Robert Seabok shot both guards at point blank range, killing Jesus Sanchez and wounding his partner George Fitzgerald.

After the police captured Beaty and Hobson nearly a month later, Beaty named Venceremos members Hobson, Seabok, Andrea Holman Burt, and Benton Burt as the perpetrators of the fatal assault on the prison guards. Former professor H. Bruce Franklin, four Venceremos members, and three Arizona residents were arrested in this case in late December 1972. A total of fourteen people were arrested; twelve were charged either with murder or, as was Franklin, with harboring Beaty, classified as a federal fugitive. Venceremos' leadership defended the killing while denying direct involvement, telling the media, "the people freed Beaty and Venceremos is the people.”

While charges were dropped against some, the chief perpetrators were prosecuted. Jean Hobson, 19 year-old Andrea Holman Burt, and her husband 31-year-old Douglas Burt were all convicted of second-degree murder in 1973 and 1974. Seabok was convicted of first-degree murder and sentenced to life imprisonment. Beaty had become a prosecution witness; he pled guilty to murder and was sentenced to life as well.

Venceremos disintegrated under the duress of legal troubles, recriminations over the Beaty incident, and general factionalism. By September 1973 the group had officially disbanded. Some members went on to other leftist groups, such as Joe Remiro, who joined the small Symbionese Liberation Army (SLA) in its early days. Donald DeFreeze, who co-founded the SLA, found shelter with members and associates of Venceremos after his escape from prison in March 1973. The Communist Party USA (Provisional) also claims to trace its origins to Venceremos. Seabok was granted parole in 2018.

== See also ==
- Chicano Movement
