= Willie Wolfe =

Founding member of the Symbionese Liberation Army

William Lawton Wolfe (February 17, 1951 – May 17, 1974) was one of the founding members in 1972 of the Symbionese Liberation Army (SLA), an American radical group based near Oakland, California. While in the group, he adopted the name "Kahjoh", though the media misspelled this as "Cujo".

Born and raised in an upper middle-class family in Connecticut, Wolfe had come west and enrolled at University of California, Berkeley, studying anthropology. He got involved with a prisoner outreach project, through which he was recruited by inmate Donald DeFreeze to the group that formed the SLA. He and six other members died in Los Angeles during a law enforcement shootout and fire in the house where they were staying. His father had commissioned an investigation of the SLA. Discussed at a press conference shortly before the fire and Wolfe's death, it suggested from strong evidence that DeFreeze was a police informant and agent provocateur.

== Early life ==
William Lawton Wolfe was born on February 17, 1951, and raised in Connecticut in an upper-middle class family. His father was L.S. Wolfe Jr, a prominent anesthetist. His parents divorced when he was 15. Wolfe boarded at Northfield Mount Hermon School, a Massachusetts prep school, but his father later said he did not thrive there. After graduating from Mount Hermon, Willie chose to delay college, and took a year-long trek to the Arctic Circle. "He asked me for $200 when he left," his father recalled with pride, "and that kid came back with $60 change."

== Move to California and political involvement ==
In 1971 Wolfe moved to San Francisco, where he enrolled in the University of California, Berkeley and studied anthropology. He took African-American Linguistics through the Department of Afro-American Studies, and was taught by Colston Westbrook. Through this class, Wolfe became involved in prisoners' rights, as Westbrook was associated with a prison outreach project. It had been organized by Venceremos, a largely Chicano leftist group, and a small group of Berkeley students (mostly white) became involved as volunteers as well. They started visiting the prisons to discuss politics and social justice issues with inmates, particularly at Vacaville prison, located about 50 miles away. There African-American prisoners had formed the Black Cultural Association.

In 1972, African-American prisoner Donald DeFreeze (Cinque) invited Wolfe and Russ Little, both white, to join his separate study group, Unisight. Inmate Thero Wheeler, a former Black Panther, was also in the clique.

In Robert Stone's 2005 documentary, Guerrilla: The Taking of Patty Hearst, Russ Little said of Wolfe:

Willie was kind of like the catalyst. Willie was the one that all these different people met. Willie was like the common denominator. Willie studied anthropology at Berkeley, and it was actually through Berkeley that he got into going to prisons. Through some class, some anthropology class.

Wolfe dropped out of college in 1972 as he became more involved in radical activism.

== Private investigation by Willie's father ==
When Willie's father learned of his son's involvement in the SLA, he hired private detective Lake Headley to provide him with more information. On May 4, 1974, Headley concluded his investigation and filed a sworn affidavit of his findings. He also held a press conference to discuss them. These included:

That Patricia Campbell Hearst and her parents disagreed bitterly over Patricia's political and personal relations. That a love affair between a black man and Patricia Hearst did take place prior to her relationship with her fiancé Steven Weed. That Mrs. Randolph A. Hearst subjected her daughter to extreme pressure to change her personal and political relationships.

On May 4, 1974, Headley, along with freelance writer Donald Freed, held a press conference in San Francisco. They presented 400 pages of documentation of their findings, some of which included:

- A year before being kidnapped, Patty Hearst had visited black convict Donald DeFreeze, who later became the SLA's figurehead.
- DeFreeze's extensive arrest records and generous probation periods;
- Berkeley professor Colston Westbrook, associated with student outreach at California prisons, had worked for the federal government in Vietnam. He also worked with the Los Angeles Police Department's CCS (Criminal Conspiracy Section) and the State of California's Sacramento-based CII (Criminal Identification and Investigation) unit.; and
- Evidence of links between the CIA and municipal police departments.

On May 17, 1974, The New York Times ran an article about the suggestions that DeFreeze was an informant for the Los Angeles Police Department, based on numerous charges against him being dropped, including some for possession of weapons and bombs.

But the major story of the day was the LAPD shootout with DeFreeze and five others in the house where they were staying. It caught on fire, and they took shelter in a crawlspace. DeFreeze committed suicide by gunshot; the five other SLA members were overcome by smoke and flames. Wolfe was one of the members who died in this fire.

More than 20 years later, Lake Headley co-wrote a book with freelance writer William Hoffman: Vegas P.I.: The Life and Times of America's Greatest Detective (1993). In it he presented well-documented evidence that Donald DeFreeze was a police informant and agent provocateur from the period when he was organizing the SLA.

== Death ==
Wolfe was burned to death after a gunfight with the Los Angeles Police Department and an ensuing house fire in south-central Los Angeles. His charred remains were found in the crawl space of the house, along with those of DeFreeze and Mizmoon, whose gas masks melted to their faces. Wolfe, who was not wearing a gas mask, had died from smoke inhalation during the fire. He was the first fatality during the shootout.

Not long after, Patty Hearst, who was still at large, released another SLA recording to the media. On it, she said of Wolfe:

Cujo was the gentlest, most beautiful man I've ever known. We loved each other so much, and his love for people was so deep that he was willing to give his life for them. Neither Cujo nor I had ever loved an individual the way we loved each other. Probably this was because our relationship wasn't based on bourgeois ... values.

But when Hearst was captured and charged, she alleged that Wolfe was among the SLA men who had raped her in the early days of her kidnapping.

After the fire in LA, three FBI agents knocked on the door of Willie's father at midnight, seeking his son's dental records. They would not confirm if Willie had been in the house during the siege. Two days later, Dr. Wolfe received a call from the Los Angeles County Coroner's office informing him that his son was dead.

== In popular culture ==
Writer Stephen King gave Wolfe's nickname to the title character (a mad dog) of the novel Cujo (1981).
