= Vacaville Prison =

Two prisons in California, United States

Two prisons are located in Vacaville, California, United States:

- California Medical Facility (CMF) ()
- California State Prison, Solano ()

These two prisons are located together at the base of several hills on the outskirts of Vacaville. These prisons are also located fairly close to Travis Air Force Base.

== See also ==
- List of California state prisons
