= Marcus Foster =

Educator murdered by the Symbionese Liberation Army (1923–1973)

- Born: Marcus Albert Foster; March 31, 1923; Athens, Georgia, US
- Died: November 6, 1973 (aged 50); Oakland, California, US
- Cause of death: Assassination by shooting
- Resting place: Mountain View Cemetery
- Education: B.A., Cheyney State College, 1947; Ed.D., University of Pennsylvania, 1971
- Occupation: Educator
- Years active: 1957–1973
- Employer: Oakland Unified School District
- Known for: Oakland's first African American Superintendent; founder of the Marcus A. Foster Educational Institute; murdered by SLA
- Title: Superintendent
- Term: 1970–1973
- Spouse: Albertine Ramseur
- Children: 1

Marcus Albert Foster (March 31, 1923 – November 6, 1973) was an American educator who gained a national reputation for educational excellence while serving as principal of Simon Gratz High School in Philadelphia, Pennsylvania (1966–1969), as Associate Superintendent of Schools in Philadelphia (1969–1970), and as the first black superintendent of a large city school district. He was appointed in 1970 as Superintendent of the Oakland Unified School District in Oakland, California. Foster was assassinated in 1973 by members of the Symbionese Liberation Army (SLA), a then newly founded domestic terrorist group.

== Early life and education ==
Marcus Albert Foster was born in Athens, Georgia, the youngest of five children. When he was three, his family moved to Philadelphia, joining the Great Migration of African Americans out of the South. Raised by a single mother, he attended public schools in Philadelphia, graduating from South Philadelphia High School. One of his grandfathers, Rev. W.D Johnson, was a minister in the African Methodist Episcopal Church (AME), and Foster's mother Alice stressed education for all her children. She encouraged his mastery of Standard English. She highlighted its importance as the dominant syntax.

As a young man, Foster was both exceptionally scholastic and rebellious, opting to frequent the Club Ziger where one had to "smoke a stogie and drink a lot of wine to get in." Furthermore, as a member of the Trojans, a neighborhood men's club, his comrade Frye noted Foster "could hold his hands up". This broad range of youth experience aided Foster throughout his life, and he had an ability to connect with and inspire students of myriad backgrounds, while drawing together disparate adult groups advocating for alternative, at times oppositional, visions of social reform. He graduated in 1947 from Cheyney State College, a historically black university. He earned a Doctor of Education (Ed.D.) from the University of Pennsylvania, an Ivy League institution.

His first cousin, Justine Wilkinson Washington, also became a noted educator.

== Career ==
From 1957 to 1970 Foster taught in the Philadelphia public schools, and served as Principal of Dunbar Elementary School, O.V. Catto School for Boys, and Gratz High School. He was noted for his work at Gratz, where he was more successful than predecessors in inspiring the students. He also served as Associate Superintendent for Community Relations.

Foster moved to Oakland in 1970 when he was appointed Superintendent of Oakland Public Schools. He was the first Black superintendent of a major urban school system. Robert Blackburn, a white colleague in Philadelphia, followed him and was appointed as a deputy superintendent.

Foster became highly respected in Oakland, negotiating in a volatile environment with numerous groups and people of various political orientations. He worked to raise the success of students in the minority-majority schools, where many families struggled with poverty.

There had been a record voter turnout in the May 1973 election for mayor, a part-time position. Republican incumbent John H. Reading won a third four-year term by defeating Democrat Bobby Seale, a co-founder of the Black Panthers and advocate of social programs. Foster worked with the groups they represented and also within the environment of a state governed by conservative Republican Ronald Reagan.

== Death ==
On November 6, 1973, as Foster was leaving a school board meeting, he was ambushed by several gunmen, and shot dead. He was hit eight times with hollow-point bullets that had been packed with cyanide, a detail that the police did not initially publicize so it could be used as a calling card if necessary. His Deputy Superintendent, Robert Blackburn, was critically wounded in the attack, but eventually recovered.

Members of an unknown group calling itself the Symbionese Liberation Army claimed responsibility. The SLA sent letters to media claiming that they killed Foster because of his alleged support of a plan to require a student identification card system in Oakland, which they called "fascist". The proposed program was intended to reduce vagrancy and keep non-student drug-dealers off campus, and Foster had already gained support from the board to modify it to meet community concerns. Police originally discounted the flyers from the unknown SLA, but when the group noted the cyanide in the bullets, law enforcement realized they had a claim. The group was later classified as terrorist based on actions including kidnapping and armed robberies.

Foster and his wife are buried in Mountain View Cemetery in Oakland. His widow, Albertine Ramseur Foster, died on December 27, 2011. Their daughter, Marsha Foster, is President Emerita of Ecumenical Theological Seminary in Detroit, Michigan.

== Honors and tributes ==
Foster received the prestigious Philadelphia Award in 1969, which recognizes individuals who have made positive contributions to the city of Philadelphia. After his death, several sites were named in his honor. These included the athletic fields at Gratz High School and the Marcus Foster Indoor Pool in Philadelphia, and the Student Union building at Cheyney University, his alma mater.

In 1973 Foster had founded the Oakland Education Institute, to raise discretionary funds to promote excellence in Oakland schools through the collaborative efforts of Oakland's diverse communities. After his death, the Institute was renamed the Marcus A. Foster Education Institute in his honor. In conjunction with Oakland-area businesses, the Institute awards 60 yearly scholarships ranging from $1000 to $2000 to Oakland high school students. Over 1,500 students have received these scholarships. The Fund also regularly awards up to $2000 to Oakland public school teachers who develop innovative educational projects.

In 1975, the Association of California School Administrators (ACSA) established the Marcus Foster Memorial Award for Administrator Excellence, which is given annually to an ACSA member who personifies the ideals of Marcus Foster. Recipients of this award receive a $5,000 grant for a designated high school senior or seniors.

The School District of Philadelphia in 2005 established the Marcus A. Foster Award, which is given annually to a School District administrator for noteworthy contributions in curriculum, instruction, school improvement or administration.

Both the University of Pennsylvania and University of California, Berkeley Graduate Schools of Education established Marcus Foster Fellowships.

During the state-mandated program to retrofit all schools for earthquake safety in the 1970s (and replace some that needed it), the Oakland portion was named the Marcus Foster Earthquake Safe program.

== Aftermath ==
After deputy Robert Blackburn recovered from the shooting, he was appointed as Acting Superintendent of Oakland Schools. Beginning in 1981, he taught Educational Leadership at California State University, Hayward, in the East Bay, and later also at University of California, Berkeley.

Escaped convict Donald DeFreeze became known as the SLA spokesman as the group gained notoriety. Patricia Soltysik and Nancy Ling Perry were founding members with him and shared leadership; they were posited as the group's main theorists. By November 1973 and this killing, DeFreeze was the only black member of the small group; the remainder were younger white radicals, most of whom were middle or upper-class, and many of whom had college degrees.

Arrested in January 1974 and convicted of being involved in the killing of Foster, founding SLA members Joe Remiro and Russ Little were sentenced to life in prison. Little was released after being acquitted on a new trial gained on appeal; he had served five years in prison, subsequently being released on that technicality. However, Remiro remained incarcerated until he was paroled in 2019 after serving 47 years behind bars.

Later Little said that Soltysik had fatally shot Foster, and Perry had fired at Blackburn but "botched that". DeFreeze wounded Blackburn with a shotgun.

In May 1974, six SLA members sought refuge in Los Angeles. There was an SLA shootout with the LAPD at a house there. DeFreeze committed suicide as the structure burned down around them. Soltysik, Perry and three other founding members of the SLA also died that day.
