= Captive Audience: A Real American Horror Story =

- Genre: True crime; Documentary
- Country of origin: United States
- Original language: English
- No. of episodes: 3

Production
- Executive producer: The Russo brothers
- Cinematography: Joe Rivera
- Production companies: High Five Content; Wonderburst

Original release
- Network: Hulu
- Release: April 21, 2022

Captive Audience: A Real American Horror Story is a 2022 three-part true crime docuseries directed by Jessica Dimmock and executive produced by The Russo brothers, which premiered on Hulu April 21, about the 1972 kidnapping and eventual 1980 return of Steven Stayner and the impact it had on the Stayner family (especially older brother Cary, who would later commit murder in 1999).

== Summary ==
Steven Stayner, then 7 years old, was kidnapped and molested by serial predator Kenneth Parnell to the point of changing the boy's name to Dennis (which became the premise to the 1989 Emmy Award-nominated miniseries I Know My First Name is Steven).

== Reception ==
Rotten Tomatoes gave the docuseries a 92% rating based on reviews from 13 critics.

The program was nominated for Outstanding Crime and Justice Documentary at the 44th News and Documentary Emmy Awards.

== See also ==
- American Horror Story
- Timmy White - rescued by Steven in 1980
- "I Got a Name " - Jim Croce song used in the trailer
