= Cary Stayner =

American serial killer (born 1961)

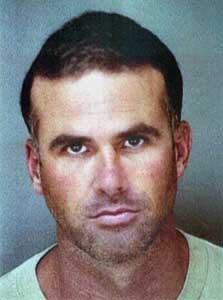
- Stayner in 1999
- Born: Cary Anthony Stayner; August 13, 1961 (age 65); Merced, California, U.S.
- Other names: The Yosemite Park Killer; The Yosemite Killer
- Status: Incarcerated
- Convictions: Federal; First degree murder (18 U.S.C. § 1111); Kidnapping resulting in death (18 U.S.C. § 1201); Attempted aggravated sexual abuse resulting in death (18 U.S.C. § 2241); California; First degree murder with special circumstances (3 counts); Kidnapping
- Penalty: Federal; Life imprisonment (no parole); California; Death

Details
- Victims: 4+
- Span of crimes: February 15 – July 21, 1999 (confirmed)
- Country: United States
- State: California
- Date apprehended: July 24, 1999

Cary Anthony Stayner (born August 13, 1961) is an American serial killer and the older brother of kidnapping victim Steven Stayner. He worked as a mechanic in Mariposa County, California, and murdered four women between February and July 1999, dumping their bodies near Yosemite National Park, leading to him being dubbed the Yosemite Park Killer or simply the Yosemite Killer. Stayner was found guilty and received a death sentence in 2002. As of May 2026, he is awaiting execution at Pelican Bay State Prison in Crescent City, California.

== Early life ==
Cary Stayner was born on August 13, 1961, the first of five children born to Delbert Foy and Kay Stayner in Merced, California. He had three sisters and a younger brother, Steven Gregory Stayner. On December 4, 1972, 7-year-old Steven was abducted by child molester Kenneth Parnell. He was held by his abductor 38 miles (61 km) away in Mariposa County, and later in Mendocino County, until he was aged 14, when he managed to escape with another of Parnell's victims, Timothy White.

Stayner later stated that he felt neglected while his parents grieved over the loss of Steven. When Steven escaped and returned home, he received massive media attention, which resulted in the 1989 release of a television miniseries based on his experience, I Know My First Name Is Steven, based on the true crime book of the same name; Cary once again felt overshadowed by the attention his brother got. Steven, who later married and had two children, died in a motorcycle accident in 1989.

Although it is believed that his brother's kidnapping contributed to Stayner's homicidal pathology, he claimed to authorities after his arrest that he had begun fantasizing about abducting and murdering women when he was seven years old, prior to the abduction of his brother. While a friend of his sister was staying over at his house, he exposed himself to her.

At the age of three, Stayner was diagnosed with trichotillomania and put on medication, though the condition continued to affect him during his high school years; the resulting bald spots led to him being severely bullied and having to perpetually wear a baseball cap. He exhibited intelligence that was noted by classmates and teachers, and he was put in accelerated classes as a result. Due to his cartoon contributions to the school newspaper, he was named the "most creative" student in his graduating class at the age of 18 at Merced High School.

After graduating, he worked as a window installer at a glass company, where he developed a fantasy about ramming a truck into the workplace, killing everyone there and setting the business on fire. In 1991, he tried to kill himself with carbon monoxide. In 1995, he was admitted to a psychiatric hospital after claiming to have had a nervous breakdown and was released after receiving treatment. He was also arrested in 1997 for possession of marijuana and methamphetamines, although these charges were eventually dropped.

== Victims ==
=== Confirmed ===
In 1997, Stayner was hired as a handyman at the Cedar Lodge motel in El Portal, California, just outside the Highway 140 entrance to Yosemite National Park. Stayner found all of his confirmed victims at the Cedar Lodge motel. Between February and July 1999, he murdered at least two women and two teenagers.

On March 18, 1999, 42-year-old Carole Evon Sund and 16-year-old Argentine exchange student Silvina Pelosso were found in the trunk of the charred remains of Sund's Pontiac rental car. The bodies were burned beyond recognition and were identified using dental records. Sund had been strangled with rope and shot but was not raped, while Pelosso had been raped and shot. A week later, the police received an anonymous note with a hand-drawn map indicating the location of the third victim, Sund's 15-year-old daughter Juliana. The top of the note read, "We had fun with this one." Investigators went to the location depicted on the map and found the remains of Juli, who had been raped and whose throat had been cut. Detectives began interviewing employees of the motel where the three victims had been staying just before their deaths on February 15. One of those employees was Stayner, but he was not considered a suspect at that point because he had no criminal history and remained calm during the police interview.

Several months later, on July 22, 1999, the decapitated body of Yosemite Institute employee Joie Ruth Armstrong, a 26-year-old naturalist, was found. Eyewitnesses reported seeing a blue 1972 International Scout parked outside the cabin where she was staying one day prior, on July 21. Detectives traced this vehicle to Stayner, which led to him becoming the prime suspect in the case. FBI agents John Boles and Jeff Rinek found Stayner staying at the Laguna del Sol nudist resort in Wilton, where he was arrested and taken to Sacramento for questioning. During his interrogation, Stayner shocked the agents when he confessed not only to Armstrong's murder but to the killings of Pelosso and the Sunds. His vehicle yielded evidence proving his link to Armstrong.

=== Suspected ===
Following his arrest, Stayner was suspected of being responsible for other homicides and disappearances in addition to his four known victims. Given that similar offenders started their killing sprees at far younger ages, investigators have stated that they think Stayner may have additional victims.

- Patricia Marie Hicks Dahlstrom, 28, last contacted family in September 1982 after relocating to Merced from Washington State. Hicks was a member of the San Anda Apostolic Church, founded by cult leader Donald Gibson, which was discovered to have carried out acts of sexual assault under religious pretenses. After Gibson was convicted of four sex offenses in 1981, Hicks left the cult and was last seen by her roommate taking public transportation to Yosemite National Park. A severed arm and hand were recovered from the park in June 1983. A skull was discovered nearby in 1988. In April 2021, genetic genealogy identified the remains as being those of Hicks. Stayner is known to have been acquainted with Gibson at the time of his 1981 trial, which he attended. Authorities believe Stayner may have chosen to kill Hicks in retaliation for testifying against Gibson.
- On December 26, 1990, Stayner's paternal uncle, 42-year-old Jesse Jerrold Stayner, was shot to death inside his Merced residence with his own shotgun. The murder was never solved and Cary, who had lived with his uncle at the time of the shooting, became a suspect after his arrest. Stayner later claimed that his uncle had molested him around the same time of Steven's kidnapping.
- In October 1994, severed human hands were found near the New Melones Reservoir. On December 13, 1994, a headless and handless torso was found in a cluster of trees off Camp 9 Road near Vallecito. A forensic pathologist determined that the detached hands belonged to the body. In December 1995, the remains were identified as belonging to 24-year-old Sharalyn Mavonne Murphy. Her head has never been found. The FBI investigated Murphy's death to determine a link to Stayner due to similarities between her death and the murder of Joie Armstrong.
- Authorities also reviewed the case of 34-year-old Denise Smith, whose decomposed body was discovered in a 50-gallon burn barrel off Jacksonville Road near Don Pedro Reservoir in December 1994.
- Michael Larry Madden, age 20, planned to meet friends at Sand Bar Flat Campground in the Stanislaus National Forest near Sonora on August 10, 1996, for camping and fishing. Madden left his family's home at around 5:00 a.m. and was never seen again. At 2:00 a.m. on August 12, his companions showed up to the predetermined spot but found no sign of him. Authorities have considered that Madden may have been a victim of Stayner.

== Trial and conviction ==
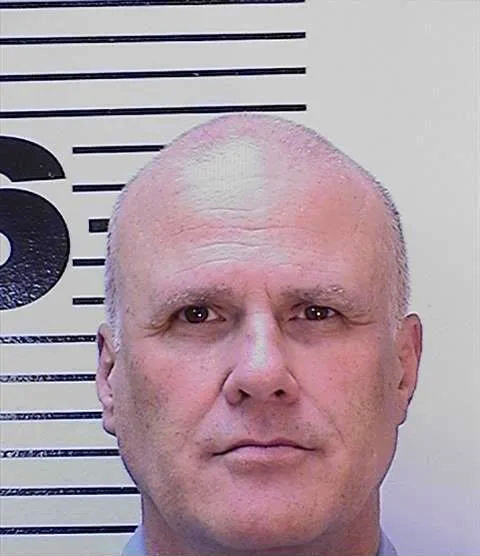
Stayner in 2018

Stayner was tried in federal court for Armstrong's murder, since it occurred on federal land. To avoid a possible death sentence, he pleaded guilty to premeditated first-degree murder, felony first-degree murder, kidnapping resulting in death and attempted aggravated sexual abuse resulting in death. During the sentencing hearing, Stayner stunned the courtroom when he suddenly broke down in tears and apologized. "I wish I could take it back, but I can't", he said. "I wish I could tell you why I did such a thing, but I don't even know myself. I'm so sorry. I wish there was a reason. But there isn't. It's senseless." Armstrong's mother started crying as she listened to Stayner, and said afterward that she believed his apology was genuine. Stayner was sentenced to life in prison without parole.

Stayner pleaded not guilty by reason of insanity to the other murders in state court. His lawyers claimed that the Stayner family had a history of sexual abuse and mental illness, manifesting itself not only in the murders, but also his obsessive–compulsive disorder and his request to be provided with child pornography in return for his confession. Dr. Jose Arturo Silva testified that Stayner had obsessive–compulsive disorder, mild autism and paraphilia. He was nevertheless found sane and convicted of three counts of first-degree murder with special circumstances and one count of kidnapping by a jury on August 27, 2002. Stayner was housed at San Quentin State Prison from 2002 to 2023.

In April 2026, the California Supreme Court denied Stayner's appeal of his death sentence. As of May 2026, Stayner remains on death row at Pelican Bay State Prison in Crescent City, California, but there have been no executions in California since a 2006 court ruling over flaws in the administration of capital punishment in the state. In November 2026, California Governor Gavin Newsom commuted the death sentences of all 548 people on death row in California, including Stayner.

== Media portrayals ==
- Stayner's case was featured in an episode of American Justice produced in 2002.
- In 2011, Stayner's investigation and arrest were featured in an episode of FBI: Criminal Pursuit, titled "Trail of Terror", airing on Investigation Discovery.
- In 2013, the history of Stayner's progress from student to the convicted murderer was told in an episode of the U.K. television series Born to Kill? titled, "Yosemite Park Slayer."
- The American Court TV (now TruTV) television series Mugshots released an episode on the Stayner case titled "Cary Stayner – The Cedar Lodge Killings".
- In 2018, the Reelz channel aired an hour-long documentary about the murders titled Yosemite Park Killer.
- On January 26, 2019, ABC News broadcast a 20/20 episode covering the Stayner brothers, titled "Evil in Eden".
- On August 30, 2020, HLN aired "The Yosemite Murders: The Missing Women (Part 1)" and "The Yosemite Murders: The Evil Side (Part 2)", from the documentary series How It Really Happened.
- On October 31, 2020, Casefile, an Australian true crime podcast, released the first of two episodes on Stayner with the title "The Yosemite Sightseer Murders." The second episode was released on November 7, 2020. The podcast released an episode on Steven Stayner's kidnapping earlier in 2020.
- In April 2022, a Hulu three-part documentary Captive Audience: A Real American Horror Story focused on the lives of Steven and Cary Stayner.
- In Season 5, Episode 19 of Criminal Minds, Cary Stayner is mentioned by Dr. Spencer Reid.

== See also ==
- List of serial killers in the United States
- List of serial killers by number of victims
- List of homicides in California
- List of death row inmates in the United States
- History of the Yosemite area
