= Montecalvo =

Montecalvo may refer to:

== Places in Italy ==
- Montecalvo in Foglia, province of Pesaro and Urbino, Marche
- Montecalvo Irpino, province of Avellino, Campania
- Montecalvo Versiggia, province of Pavia, Lombardy

== People ==
- Dan Montecalvo (1941–2013), American murderer
- Frankie Montecalvo (b. 1990), American racing driver

== Other uses ==
- Montecalvo (grape), another name for the Italian wine grape Falanghina

== See also ==
- Moncalvo, province of Alessandria, Piedmont
