= Kenneth Parnell =

American sex offender, child rapist and kidnapper (1931–2008)

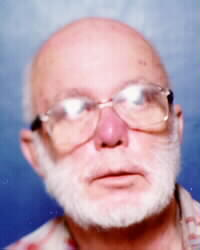
- Mug shot of Parnell from the California state sex offender registry
- Born: Kenneth Eugene Parnell; September 26, 1931; Amarillo, Texas, U.S.
- Died: January 21, 2008 (aged 76); Vacaville, California, U.S.
- Known for: Kidnappings; child molestation; rape
- Spouse: Patsy Jo Dorton (m. 1949; div. 1957)

Kenneth Eugene Parnell (September 26, 1931 – January 21, 2008) was an American sex offender, child rapist, and kidnapper who abducted 7-year-old Steven Stayner in Merced, California, in 1972 and 5-year-old Timothy White in Ukiah, California, in 1980. He was convicted in 2004 for attempting to purchase a child for sex and died in prison.

== Early life ==
Kenneth Eugene Parnell was born in Amarillo, Texas, to Cecil Frederick and Mary Olive (née Pollard) Parnell, during the region's Dust Bowl era during the Great Depression. He later moved with his mother, his two half-sisters, and a half-brother to Bakersfield, California, where his mother operated a boarding lodge. Parnell was raised mostly without his father, who abandoned the family when Parnell was six. After that time, he was in and out of juvenile custody for car theft and arson.

In March 1951, Parnell was arrested for raping a young boy and impersonating a police officer; he was sentenced to four years in prison. Parnell had lured the child through use of a deputy sheriff's badge he bought at an army-navy surplus store. He escaped from a state institution in Norwalk but was recaptured.

In a 2000 interview about his 1951 crime, Parnell said he kidnapped and molested the boy because his wife was pregnant and that he "had to find another outlet." He claimed to have had three wives, but records could only show two marriages. Parnell married 15-year-old Patsy Jo Dorton (1935–2018) in 1949, had a daughter in 1951, and divorced in 1957. Later that year he married again and had another daughter. Parnell denied in that same interview having been sexually abused himself, although Mike Echols' book I Know My First Name Is Steven claims that he was molested at the age of 13 by a boarder in a rooming house that his mother owned in Bakersfield.

More than a decade after the sodomy case, Parnell was convicted of armed robbery in Utah. While imprisoned for this charge, his second wife filed for divorce. Parnell claimed to have married a third and final time in 1968, but no records have ever been found to substantiate this. Parnell’s father, Cecil Frederick, died July 31, 1972, in Denver.

== Child abductions ==
On December 4, 1972, Parnell abducted seven-year-old Merced resident Steven Stayner with the help of Edward Ervin Murphy, a co-worker at the Yosemite Lodge, where Parnell worked as a night auditor. Stayner was taken to Cathey's Valley. (Parnell's cabin was, unbeknownst to Stayner, located only several hundred feet from his maternal grandfather's residence.) Parnell went on to tell Stayner that his parents could not afford to keep him anymore, that a judge had given Parnell legal custody of him, and that his new name was "Dennis Gregory Parnell", retaining Steven's true second name.

Stayner lived as Parnell's "son" for seven years, during which he was repeatedly sexually abused and brainwashed by Parnell and Barbara Mathias. In addition to the molestation, Stayner later claimed that Parnell's attitude altered from severe beatings to sometimes "spoiling" him. As Steven got older and entered puberty, Parnell's sexual interest in Stayner waned, and Parnell sought a new boy to "build his family". He had attempted another kidnapping with his mistress Barbara Mathias, but that failed to go to plan. He also conscripted Stayner into aiding him in kidnappings, but Stayner had always failed to grab the targeted child to the point Parnell stopped using Stayner as an accomplice, berating him for being an "incompetent". Years later in interviews, Stayner revealed he intentionally sabotaged the kidnappings.

=== Arrest ===
On February 14, 1980, Parnell abducted five-year-old Timothy White from Ukiah with the help of Sean Poorman, a minor and an acquaintance of Stayner. Weeks afterward, Stayner escaped Parnell's house with White; he later said he did not want the boy to suffer the abuse that he had endured. Stayner waited until Parnell had gone to his night shift job as a clerk at a local motel on March 1, 1980, and, carrying White on his back, hitchhiked 40 miles to Ukiah. Unfamiliar with the city, Stayner decided the best option was to seek out the local police, who originally considered him a delinquent, until an exhaustive search of missing child posters and a piecemeal interrogation confirmed he was a missing child as well. By daybreak the following morning, Parnell had been arrested. While investigators were checking into Parnell's past, the 1951 sodomy and 1962 escape convictions came to light, although at the time Stayner insisted that Parnell had not sexually abused him.

=== 1981 trials ===
Parnell was tried for kidnapping Stayner and White, but not for sexual abuse. He was convicted of both kidnappings and served five years of his seven-year prison sentence. Edward Murphy, Parnell's accomplice from the Stayner kidnapping, was sentenced to five years imprisonment and paroled after two years. Sean Poorman, Stayner's schoolfriend who abetted Parnell in the White kidnapping, was sentenced to a term in a juvenile work camp. Barbara Mathias, Parnell's girlfriend who lived with him and Stayner for some time, was never charged with any violation and cooperated with authorities in Parnell's trials.

Stayner died in 1989 of injuries sustained in a motorcycle accident.

=== 2004 convictions ===
In January 2003, Parnell was arrested again after trying to coerce his caregiver's sister, Diane Stevens, into buying him a four-year-old boy for $500. Parnell was, by this time, 71 years old and suffering from diabetes and emphysema, as well as other ailments brought on by an earlier stroke, requiring near 24-hour-a-day nursing care in his cluttered apartment in the 2600 block of Mathews Street in Berkeley.

Stevens was aware of Parnell's past and cooperated with police in setting up a sting operation that would lead to his arrest. According to Diane Stevens' testimony, Parnell requested that the child have a "clean" rectum, indicating sexual intentions. He paid $100 for a birth certificate and had $400 on his person for the completion of the transaction when he was to receive the child on January 3, 2003. Parnell was arrested that day, subsequently telling authorities, "I wanted a family".

Parnell was convicted on February 9, 2004, on the charges of attempting to purchase a child and attempted child molestation, even though no child had been targeted. The prosecution successfully argued that sexual aids and pornography found in the apartment, along with Stevens’s testimony, were enough to prove that Parnell's intentions were criminal in nature. Parnell was sentenced to 25 years to life under California's "three strikes" law.

Prosecutor Tim Wellman had largely argued his case before the jury by showing a slideshow of Stayner marked "1", then of White marked "2", and a blank screen marked "3" to show the nonexistent child that would have been abducted had police not been notified. Wellman said Parnell "was looking for one last hurrah. One last Steven Stayner, one last Timmy White."

== Death ==
Parnell remained incarcerated until his death, at age 76, on January 21, 2008, at the California Medical Facility in Vacaville, California. According to prison officials, Parnell died of natural causes. He had been under hospice care for some time.

== Media adaptations ==
Stayner's account of his time with Parnell formed the basis of a 1991 book by Mike Echols. Prior to publication, the manuscript served as the basis for the 1989 TV miniseries I Know My First Name Is Steven with Arliss Howard as Parnell.

Captive Audience: A Real American Horror Story aired on Hulu with all three episodes available immediately on the release date of April 21, 2022.

== See also ==
- List of long-term false imprisonment cases
- Cary Stayner, brother of Steven and serial killer
