= Steven Stayner =

American child kidnapping victim (1965–1989)

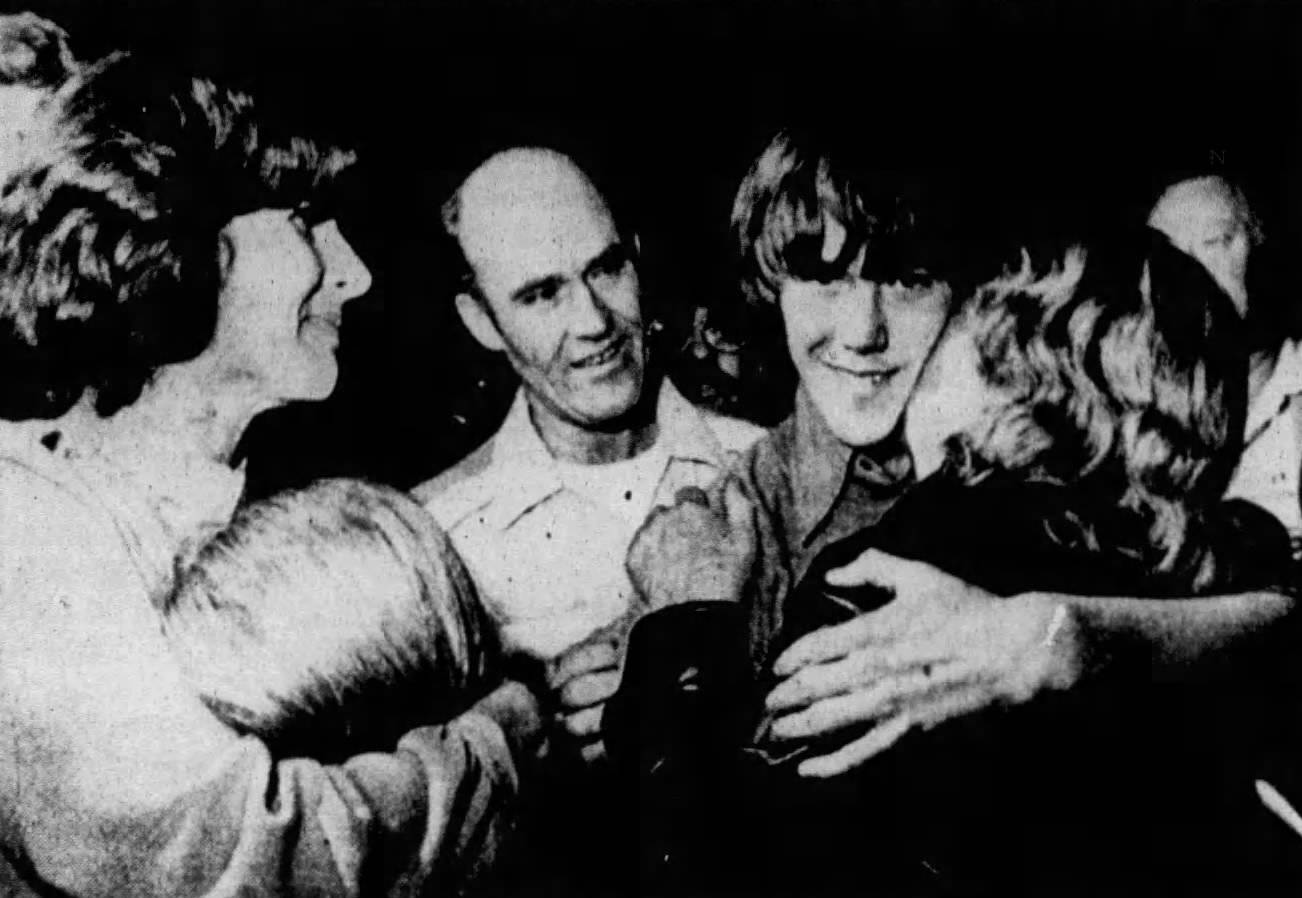
- Stayner reuniting with family
- Born: Steven Gregory Stayner; April 18, 1965; Merced, California, U.S.
- Disappeared: December 4, 1972 (aged 7); Merced, California, U.S.
- Died: September 16, 1989 (aged 24); Merced, California, U.S.
- Resting place: Merced Cemetery District
- Spouse: Jody Edmondson (m. 1985)
- Children: 2
- Relatives: Cary Stayner (brother)

Steven Gregory Stayner (April 18, 1965 – September 16, 1989) was an American kidnapping victim. On December 4, 1972, seven-year-old Stayner was abducted in Merced, California, by child molester Kenneth Parnell. He was held by his abductor 38 miles (60 km) away in Mariposa County, and later in Mendocino County, until he was aged 14, when he managed to escape with another of Parnell's victims, five-year-old Timothy White. His brother, Cary Stayner, later became a serial killer.

== Birth and family ==
Steven Stayner was the third of five children born to Delbert and Kay Stayner in Merced, California. He had three sisters and an older brother, Cary. In 2002 Cary was convicted and sentenced to death for the murders of four women near Yosemite National Park.

== Kidnapping ==
On the afternoon of December 4, 1972, Stayner was approached on his way home from school by Ervin Edward Murphy, who had become acquainted with convicted child molester Kenneth Parnell when they worked at a resort in Yosemite National Park. Murphy, described by those who knew him as a trusting, naïve and simple-minded man, had been enlisted by Parnell (who had passed himself off to Murphy as an aspiring minister) into helping him abduct a young boy so that Parnell could "raise him in a religious-type deal", as Murphy later stated.

Acting on instructions from Parnell, Murphy passed out religious tracts to boys walking home from school that day and, after spotting Stayner, claimed to be a church representative seeking donations. Stayner later claimed that Murphy asked him if his mother would be willing to give any items to the church. When the boy replied that she would, Murphy asked Stayner where he lived and if he would be willing to take him to his home.

After Stayner had agreed, a white Buick driven by Parnell pulled up and Stayner willingly climbed into the car with Murphy. Parnell then drove a confused Stayner to his cabin in nearby Catheys Valley instead. Unbeknownst to Stayner, Parnell's cabin was only a few hundred feet from his maternal grandfather's home.

Parnell molested Stayner during the first night at the cabin. He began raping the boy 13 days later, on December 17. After Stayner had told Parnell many times during that first week that he wanted to go home, Parnell told Stayner that he had been granted legal custody of the boy because his parents could not afford so many children and that they did not want him any more.

Parnell began calling the boy "Dennis Gregory Parnell", retaining Stayner's real middle name and his real birth date when enrolling him in various schools over the next several years. Parnell passed himself off as Stayner's father, and the two moved frequently around California, living in locations including Santa Rosa and Comptche. Parnell allowed Stayner to begin drinking at a young age and to come and go virtually as he pleased. As he frequently moved from one menial job to another, some of his work required travel and leaving Stayner unguarded. An adult Stayner later remarked that he could have easily used these absences as opportunities to flee, but was unaware how to summon help.

Parnell gave Stayner a Manchester Terrier that he named Queenie. This dog had been given to Parnell by his mother, who was not aware of Stayner's existence during the period when he was being held by Parnell.

For a period of 18 months, Barbara Mathias lived with Parnell and Stayner. According to Stayner, Mathias, along with Parnell, raped him on nine occasions at age 9. In 1975, on Parnell's instruction, Mathias tried to lure another young boy, who was in the Santa Rosa Boys' Club with Stayner, into Parnell's car. The attempt was unsuccessful. Mathias later claimed to have been completely unaware that "Dennis" had been kidnapped.

=== Escape ===
As Stayner entered puberty, Parnell began to look for a younger child to kidnap. Parnell had used Stayner to attempt to kidnap children on prior occasions, but all the kidnapping attempts were unsuccessful. This caused Parnell to believe Stayner lacked the means to be an accomplice. Stayner revealed later that he had intentionally sabotaged these failed kidnappings. On February 14, 1980, Parnell and Randall Sean Poorman, a teenage friend of Stayner, kidnapped five-year-old Timothy White in Ukiah. Motivated in part by the young boy's distress, Stayner decided to return the boy to his parents.

On March 1, 1980, while Parnell was away at his night security job, Stayner left the house with White and hitchhiked into Ukiah, California. After they were unable to locate White's residence, they went to a police station. By daybreak on March 2, Parnell had been arrested on suspicion of abducting both boys. When the police checked into his background, they found a previous sodomy conviction from 1951. Both children were reunited with their families that day. Parnell was tried and convicted in 1981 of kidnapping White and Stayner in two trials. He was sentenced to seven years, but was paroled after serving five.

Parnell was not charged with the numerous sexual assaults on Stayner and other boys because most of them occurred outside the jurisdiction of the Merced County prosecutor or were by then outside the statute of limitations. The Mendocino County prosecutors, acting almost entirely alone, decided not to prosecute Parnell for the sexual assaults that occurred in their jurisdiction.

Murphy, for helping kidnap Stayner, and Poorman, for helping kidnap White, were convicted of lesser charges. Both claimed they knew nothing of the sexual assaults on Stayner. Mathias was never arrested. Stayner remembered the kindness "Uncle" Murphy had shown him in his first week of captivity while they were both under the influence of Parnell's manipulation, and he believed that Murphy was as much Parnell's victim as he and White were. Stayner's kidnapping and its aftermath prompted California lawmakers to change state laws "to allow consecutive prison terms in similar abduction cases."

== Later life and death ==
After returning to his family, Stayner had trouble adjusting to a more structured household as he had been allowed to smoke, drink and do as he pleased when he lived with Parnell. In an interview with Newsweek shortly after his escape, Stayner said, "I returned almost a grown man and yet my parents saw me at first as their 7-year-old. After they stopped trying to teach me the fundamentals all over again, it got better. But why doesn't my dad hug me anymore? [...] Everything has changed. Sometimes I blame myself. I don't know sometimes if I should have come home. Would I have been better off if I didn't?"

Stayner underwent brief counseling but never sought additional treatment. He also refused to disclose all the details of sexual abuse he endured from Parnell. In a 2007 interview, Stayner's sister said that her brother did not seek counseling because their father said Stayner "didn't need any". She added, "He [Steven] got on with his life but he was pretty messed up." Stayner was bullied by other children at school for being molested and eventually dropped out. He began to drink frequently and was eventually kicked out of the family home; his relationship with his father would remain strained.

In 1985, Stayner married 17-year-old Jody Edmondson, with whom he had two children: a daughter Ashley and a son Steven Jr. He also worked with child abduction groups, spoke to children about personal safety and gave interviews about his kidnapping. Stayner joined the Church of Jesus Christ of Latter-day Saints shortly before his death. At the time of his death, Stayner was living in Merced and working at a pizza shop.

On September 16, 1989, Stayner was killed on his way home from work when a car turned in front of his motorcycle in a hit and run accident. Five hundred people attended Stayner's funeral, at which 14-year-old Timothy White was a pallbearer.

== Media adaptations ==
In early 1989, a two-part television miniseries based on Stayner's experience, I Know My First Name Is Steven (also known as The Missing Years), was produced. Stayner, taking a leave of absence from his job, acted as an advisor for Lorimar-Telepictures and had a non-speaking part, playing one of the two policemen who escort 14-year-old Steven (played by Corin Nemec) through the crowds to his waiting family. Although pleased with the dramatization, Stayner did complain that it depicted him as a somewhat "obnoxious, rude" person, especially toward his parents, something he refuted while publicizing the miniseries in the spring of 1989. The miniseries was first broadcast by NBC on May 21–22, 1989. Screening rights were sold to a number of international television companies including the BBC, which screened the miniseries in mid-July of the following year; later still, it was released as a feature-length movie.

The production, which received four Emmy Award nominations, including one for Nemec, was based on a manuscript by Mike Echols, who had researched the story and interviewed Stayner and Parnell, among others. After the premiere, Echols published his book, also titled I Know My First Name is Steven, in 1991. In the epilogue to his book, Echols describes how he infiltrated NAMBLA. In 1999, against the wishes of the Stayner family, Echols wrote an additional chapter about Steven's older brother Cary at the request of his publisher, which then re-published the book.

The title of the film and book are taken from the first paragraph of Steven's written police statement, given during the early hours of March 2, 1980, in Ukiah. It reads:

"My name is Steven Stainer [sic]. I am fourteen years of age. I don't know my true birthdate, but I use April 18, 1965. I know my first name is Steven, I'm pretty sure my last is Stainer [sic], and if I have a middle name, I don't know it."

Stayner's story was also included in the book Against Their Will by Nigel Cawthorne, a compilation of stories of kidnappings.

A 2019 episode of the TV show 9-1-1 featured a storyline adapted from Stayner's experience, featuring a man named Eric Parnell as the abductor and a character named Stevie as the 13-year-old abductee. In the episode Stevie had been living with Parnell since his abduction seven years before at the age of six and was able to save a second boy abducted by Parnell.

In April 2022, Hulu released a limited true-crime docuseries Captive Audience: A Real American Horror Story following the life of Stayner and his family and how the kidnapping affected their lives. Particular attention was paid to how the events affected the life of Cary Stayner. The docuseries focused heavily on the miniseries and featured appearances by both Corin Nemec and Todd Eric Andrews.

== Aftermath ==
Ten years after Stayner's death, the city of Merced asked its residents to propose names for city parks honoring Merced's notable citizens. Stayner's parents proposed that one be named "Stayner Park". This idea was eventually rejected and the honor was instead given to another Merced resident because Stayner's brother Cary confessed to, and was convicted of, killing four women in 1999; Merced city officials feared that the name "Stayner Park" would be associated with Cary rather than Steven.

In 2004, Parnell, then 72 years old, was convicted of trying the previous year to persuade his caretaker's sister to procure for him a young boy for five hundred US dollars. Aware of Parnell's past, she reported this to local police. White, then a grown man, was subpoenaed to testify in Parnell's criminal trial. Although Stayner was dead, his testimony at Parnell's earlier trial was read to jurors as evidence in Parnell's 2004 trial. Parnell died of natural causes on January 21, 2008, at the California Medical Facility in Vacaville, while serving a sentence of 25 years to life.

White later became a deputy in the Los Angeles County Sheriff's Department. He died on April 1, 2010, at age 35 from pulmonary embolism. Nearly five months later, on August 28, a statue of Stayner and White was dedicated in Applegate Park in Merced. Residents of Ukiah, White's hometown, carved a statue showing a teenage Stayner with young White in hand while escaping their captivity. Fundraisers for the statue have stated that it is meant to honor Stayner and give families of missing and kidnapped children hope that they are still alive.

== See also ==
- List of long-term false imprisonment cases
