= Rottentail =

2019 film

- Directed by: Brian Skiba
- Based on: Rottentail by: David C. Hayes; Kevin Moyers
- Produced by: Omid Zader; Mitchell Welch; Brenton Earley
- Starring: Dominique Swain; Corin Nemec; Gianni Capaldi; William McNamara
- Cinematography: Patrice Lucien Cochet
- Edited by: Brian Skiba
- Music by: David Findlay
- Distributed by: Ammo Content
- Release date: April 12, 2019
- Running time: 106 minutes
- Country: United States
- Language: English
- Box office: $3,383

Rottentail is a 2019 American comedy horror film directed by Brian Skiba and starring Dominique Swain, Corin Nemec and Gianni Capaldi. The film is based on the graphic novel of the same name by Kevin Moyers and David C. Hayes. The film focuses on researcher Peter Cotton (Corin Nemec) who gets bitten by a mutant rabbit, and then transforms into half-man/half-bunny who kills the local town.

== Plot ==
Peter Cotton is a meek fertility researcher. The military believes his genetic work can be used to create super-soldiers. When one of his genetically-engineered rabbits bites him, Cotton is transformed into Rottentail. He returns to his home town, Easter Falls, on Holy Saturday and begins to take revenge on everyone who bullied and wronged him. He eventually starts pursuing the girl who rejected him as a teen.

== Cast ==
- Corin Nemec as Peter Cotten / Rottentail
- Dominique Swain as Anna Banana
- William McNamara as Jake Mulligan
- Gianni Capaldi as Dr. Serius Stanley
- Tank Jones as General Phelps
- Vincent De Paul as Principal Meyers
- Brian Skiba as Billy
- Mark Speno as Dr. Major Donelly
- Elizabeth Isaacson as Church Parishioner
- Laurie Love as Mayor Riggs

== Reception ==
The film has received mostly negative reviews from critics. On review aggregator website Rotten Tomatoes, the film holds an approval rating of 17% based on six reviews, and an average rating of 3.8/10.

Noel Murray from the Los Angeles Times noted that the film is "as goofy as it is gory" and that it is "overlong and the humor’s too broad"

== Awards ==
Award	Ceremony	Category	Recipient(s)	Result	Ref.
Fixion Fest	5th Fixion Fest	Best Actor	Corin Nemec	Won	
Fixion Fest	5th Fixion Fest	Best feature-length film		Nominated	
