= S.S. Doomtrooper =

2006 television film

- Written by: Berkeley Anderson
- Directed by: David Flores
- Starring: Corin Nemec; Ben Cross; James Pomichter
- Theme music composer: Jamie Christopherson
- Country of origin: United States
- Original languages: English; German; French

Production
- Producers: Jeffery Beach; Phillip J. Roth; T.J. Sakasegawa
- Cinematography: Lorenzo Senatore
- Editor: Max Stone

Original release
- Network: Sci Fi Channel
- Release: April 1, 2006

S.S. Doomtrooper is a 2006 television science fiction film starring Corin Nemec, in which a mutated Nazi supersoldier, who can generate electrical charges as a weapon, and has greatly enhanced strength, fights against Allied troops during World War II. It was aired from Sci Fi Channel on April 1, 2006.

The character of Private Parker Lewis is an homage to Corin Nemec's character from the Fox comedy series Parker Lewis Can't Lose.

== Plot ==
During World War II, SS Lieutenant Reinhardt arrives at the Citadel, a French castle being used as a German laboratory. He meets Dr. Ullman (Ben Cross), whom he relieves of command. He finds three caged dogs who are horribly mutated; they are extremely muscled and their bodies glow. Ullman reveals that this is his latest experiment and requests one of Reinhardt's men for a demonstration.

A soldier is strapped into a capsule and injected with a chemical, then exposed to an unknown type of radiation. Moments later, he collapses and begins to transform: his skin turns blue, and he becomes hugely muscled and sprouts claws.

In the United States, Captain Pete Malloy (Corin Nemec), is tasked with locating and destroying the Citadel. He forms a team of British and American prisoners who are offered their freedom in exchange for participation. He also enlists his friend, Sergeant Digger of the Royal Marines. They prematurely parachute into German territory under heavy anti-aircraft fire. Two soldiers (Corporal Johnson and Private Andy Papadakis) are separated from the team and continue to the meeting point.

Lieutenant Reinhardt, after learning of the team's arrival, gives Dr. Ullman permission to test the Doomtrooper.

Johnson and Papadakis encounter the Doomtrooper in a local village. They try to kill it but the Doomtrooper just shrugs off the bullets. Johnson is shot by a machine gun attached to the creature's arm. Papadakis prepares to fight but the team arrives and fires at the Doomtrooper. They repel it long enough for Papadakis to escape. The group throw grenades at the Doomtrooper and assume it is dead.

Reinhardt is pleased with the report about the Doomtrooper engaging the Allied soldiers. He orders a team to recover the Doomtrooper. Ullman tells his assistant that the soldiers will be killed by it. This comes true when the Doomtrooper slaughters the German team and then grabs the team leader and electrocutes him.

The Allied soldiers search for a place to hide. They enter an empty building, but stumble upon a French Resistance hideout, led by Mariette Martinet. They decide to team up to kill the monster. The soldiers and resistance fighters plan to take and raid an ammunition dump, and use the explosives to destroy the Citadel.

That night, the Doomtrooper attacks the hideout, killing most of the French Resistance. Corporal Potter briefly disables the Doomtrooper with a grenade launcher, but after it recovers, Potter punches it in the face. This surprisingly harms the Doomtrooper, but it quickly recovers, picks up Potter, and shoots him in half. Private Lewis twists his ankle as he flees and is nearly killed, but the Doomtrooper runs out of ammunition. The Doomtrooper fails to notice the soldiers hiding from it and walks off.

Back at the Citadel, Reinhardt orders Ullman back to Berlin after ending the Doomtrooper project. Enraged, Ullman shoots Reinhardt and his adjutant, then orders his assistant to gather more men so he can grow new Doomtroopers.

On their way to the ammo dump, the team comes across a German panzer out hunting for the Doomtrooper. Papadakis kills the tank commander and they steal the tank. Just then the Doomtrooper attacks, having been attracted by the gunshots. They fire a tank round at the Doomtrooper at point blank range, but that only stuns it.

Jones disguises himself as the tank commander and they proceed to the ammo dump. Jones distracts the Germans while the team takes control of a guard post with a machine gun, which they use to shoot the distracted Germans. They decide to detonate the entire munitions dump to destroy the Doomtrooper.

Captain Malloy and Mariette lure the Doomtrooper into an ammunition bunker by using a flamethrower. They escape by elevator while the rest of the team close the bunker door, trapping the Doomtrooper inside. After forgetting to lock the door, Jean-Claude attempts to bar it to prevent the Doomtrooper from escaping, but the creature electrocutes him through the iron door. The rest of the team escapes to a safe distance and detonates the munitions.

The team makes their way to the Citadel, but the Germans are ready and plan to stop them. On the way, they encounter a sniper. Jones is ordered to distract the sniper so that Papadakis can take him out. Papadakis is about to fire, but is shot through his scope. Enraged because he could not distract the German sniper, Jones runs out into an open field and is also shot, though it buys Captain Malloy time to kill the German sniper. They decide that they must leave the wounded Jones behind because he will slow them down. Once alone, Jones discovers that his family medallion blocked the bullet, saving his life.

Meanwhile, the team steals a Kubelwagen full of wine and gets into the castle by disguising themselves. Their cover is almost blown, but Jones shows up with a rocket launcher and leads the guards into the forest, where he is eventually killed. Taking advantage of the distraction, the Allied team kills the remaining Germans, but the ones who chased Jones into the forest return. During the ensuing fight, Digger blows himself up, destroying most of the remaining Germans. The team is captured by Doctor Ullman's assistant, who takes them into his lab. While the doctor is explaining his plans, Captain Malloy, Mariette and Private Lewis, break free. Malloy and Mariette overpower the guards and hold Ullman at gunpoint while they examine the lab. They then kill the German soldier in the capsule transforming into a Doomtrooper.

Lewis realizes he can short circuit the lab's power by hotwiring the controls of the Doomtrooper capsule. However, Ullman strikes Mariette down and wounds Lewis before being wounded by Malloy. His assistant tries to escape but runs into the original Doomtrooper, who survived the ammo dump and killed all the guards. Ullman orders it to kill everyone in the room, so it begins with his assistant.

In order to buy Lewis time, Malloy fights the Doomtrooper, cutting off its hand, even though the Doomtrooper was uninjured by bullets and missiles. Meanwhile, Lewis short circuits the power but is electrocuted. After being thrown by the Doomtrooper, Malloy picks up two electrical cables and jams them under the creature's helmet, killing it. Malloy, Mariette and an injured, but alive, Digger barely escapes the castle as it crumbles down around them.

Back in America, Captain Malloy reports to General Carmichael and when the general asks for any experimental records or data, Malloy says that it only killed his friends and should never be recreated again. Outside, Malloy says that the General wouldn't mind if they borrow his car. He rigs the car and drives away with Digger and Mariette.

== Super-soldier ==
The CGI super-soldier, is a Nazi that was mutated into a monstrous creature after being exposed to an unknown type of radiation. Transformed by a mad scientist (played by Ben Cross), it is meant to battle the invading Allied troops, but instead turns on its creators. The Doomtrooper is loyal only to his creator, Dr. Ullman. It is equipped with an arm-mounted auto-cannon and can electrocute its victims. The creature also has self-regenerative powers and is nearly indestructible. After killing nearly everybody that gets in its path, the Doomtrooper is killed after being injected with an overdose of the radioactive material.

== Cast ==
- Corin Nemec as Capt. Pete Malloy
- James Pomichter as Pvt. Parker Lewis
- Marianne Filali as Mariette Martinet
- Ben Cross as Dr. Ullman
- Kirk B.R. Woller as Lt. Reinhardt
- Harry Van Gorkum as Sgt. Digger
- Asen Blatechki as Pvt. Andy Papadakis
- Raicho Vasilev as Corporal Potter
- John Newton as Pvt. Rhys-Jones
- Boris Pankin as General Carmichael
- Julian Bailey as Jean-Michele
- Jonas Talkington as Corporal Johnson
- Lee Williams as Mr. Dougherty
- Ivo Simeonov as Mr. Smith
- Linda Russeva as Eva
- Yulian Vergov as Nazi Guard # 1
- Daniel Tzochev as SS Commander
- Evgeni Gospodinov as Citadel Guard
- Georgi Zlatarev as Radio Operator
- Georgi Spasov as Ammo Depot Guard
- Maxim Genchev as Nazi Officer
- Ivo Naidenov as Nazi SS Trooper
- Johan Benét as Drunk Nazi (uncredited)
