= Costa Mesa school car attack =

1999 murder in California, United States

Coordinates: 33.636°N 117.912°W

- Location: Southcoast Early Childhood Learning Center, Costa Mesa, California
- Date: May 3, 1999
- Deaths: 2
- Injuries: 5
- Perpetrator: Steven Allen Abrams
- Charges: Two counts of murder; Five counts of attempted murder; Two counts of attempted voluntary manslaughter

On May 3, 1999, a Santa Ana man drove into a preschool playground in Costa Mesa, California, killing two students and injuring four others as well as a teacher's aide.

== Incident ==
The driver, Steven Allen Abrams, drove his 1967 Cadillac into the playground of the Southcoast Early Childhood Learning Center on May 3, 1999. He drove the vehicle through the chain link fence around the playground and aimed for those in the playground. Witnesses stated Abrams drove past the playground and then U-turned back towards the playground before he accelerated into the schoolyard at a speed of 60 to 75 miles per hour (97 to 121 km/h). He continued through the playground, before he crashed into a tree, and trapped two boys and one girl underneath his vehicle.

=== Victims ===
The two deceased victims were Brandon Wiener, 3 years old and Sierra Soto, 4 years old. Another four students and teacher's aid Danielle Diaz were injured in the crash.

== Perpetrator ==
Steven Allen Abrams was arrested and initially charged with assault with a deadly weapon. He was convicted of two counts of murder, five counts of attempted murder and two counts of attempted voluntary manslaughter; which also include a couple that were rammed by Abrams prior to the playground being targeted. In a taped confession that was played for jurors during the trial Abrams stated; "I was executing them....as many as I could get. [...] I was aiming for as many children as I could kill." On December 15, 2000, Abrams was sentenced to life in prison without parole. Previously on November 1, 2000, jurors had steered clear of the prosecution's request of the death penalty, but decided to give him life without parole instead. Since December 26, 2000, Abrams is currently at the California Medical Facility in Vacaville.

=== Mental Health ===
Prior to the killings, Abrams had reported to have heard voices in his head which he labelled "the brainwave police" which urged him to kill people. He had been hospitalised for 72 hours after hearing the voices telling him to kill innocent people. On another occasion, Abrams was admitted to jail psychiatrists after stalking an ex-girlfriend but was promptly released after little treatment.

== Aftermath ==
The mother of Soto, Cindy Soto Beckett founded Sierra's Light Foundation to advocate for improved safety at preschools, and the mother of Wiener later founded the Brandon Cody Wiener Scholarship Fund in 2002, which sends young children victims of violent crimes to a week long summer camp in Bonsall.

== See also ==
- List of homicides in California
