= California Medical Facility =

Prison medical facility in Vacaville, California

California Medical Facility (CMF)
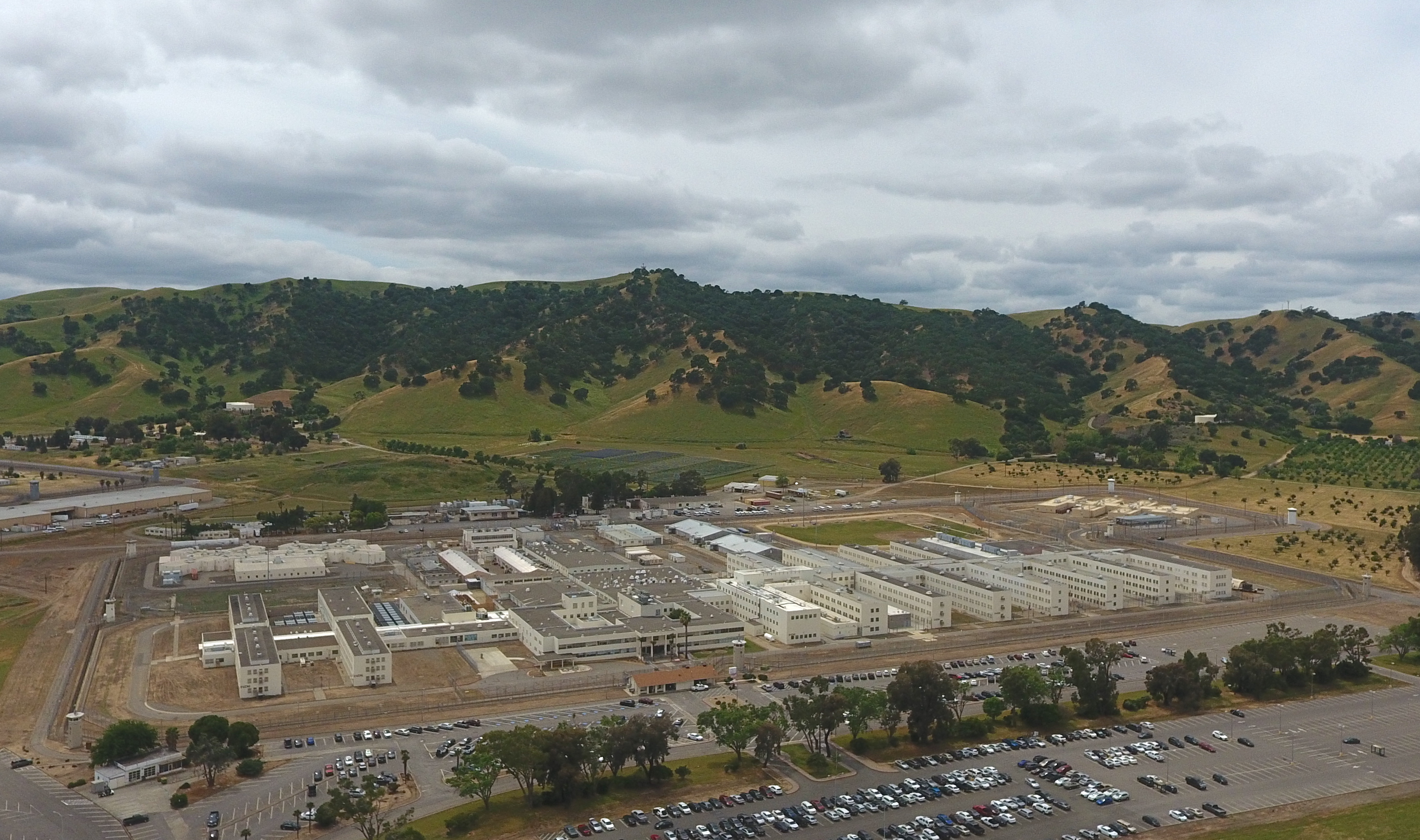
- Interactive map of California Medical Facility (CMF)
- Location: Vacaville, California; 38.329°N 121.980°W
- Status: Operational
- Security class: Minimum to Maximum
- Capacity: 2,316
- Population: 2,170 (93.7% capacity) (March 4, 2026)
- Opened: 1955
- Managed by: California Department of Corrections and Rehabilitation
- Warden: Sircoya M. Williams

California Medical Facility (CMF) is a male-only state prison medical facility located in the city of Vacaville in Solano County, California. It is older than California State Prison, Solano, the other state prison in Vacaville.

== Facilities ==
CMF's facilities include Level I ("Open dormitories without a secure perimeter") housing, Level II ("Open dormitories with secure perimeter fences and armed coverage") housing, Level III and IV ("Individual cells, fenced perimeters and armed coverage") housing.

With a "general acute care hospital, correctional treatment center (CTC), licensed elderly care unit, in-patient and out-patient psychiatric facilities, a hospice unit for terminally ill inmates, housing and treatment for inmates identified with AIDS/HIV, general population, and other special inmate housing," it is known as "the [California] prison system's health care flagship" and "has many of its best clinical programs." CMF has the largest hospital among California prisons.

In 2005, CMF had 506 medical staff positions (many of which were not filled) and a health care budget of $72.3 million. As of Fiscal Year 2006/2007, CMF had a total of 1,853 staff and an annual budget of $180 million. As of September 2007, it had a design capacity of 2,179 but a total institution population of 3,047, for an occupancy rate of 139.9 percent.

As of April 30, 2020, CMF was incarcerating people at 101.5% of its design capacity, with 2,396 occupants.

== History ==
Location of Vacaville within Solano County, and location of Solano County within California

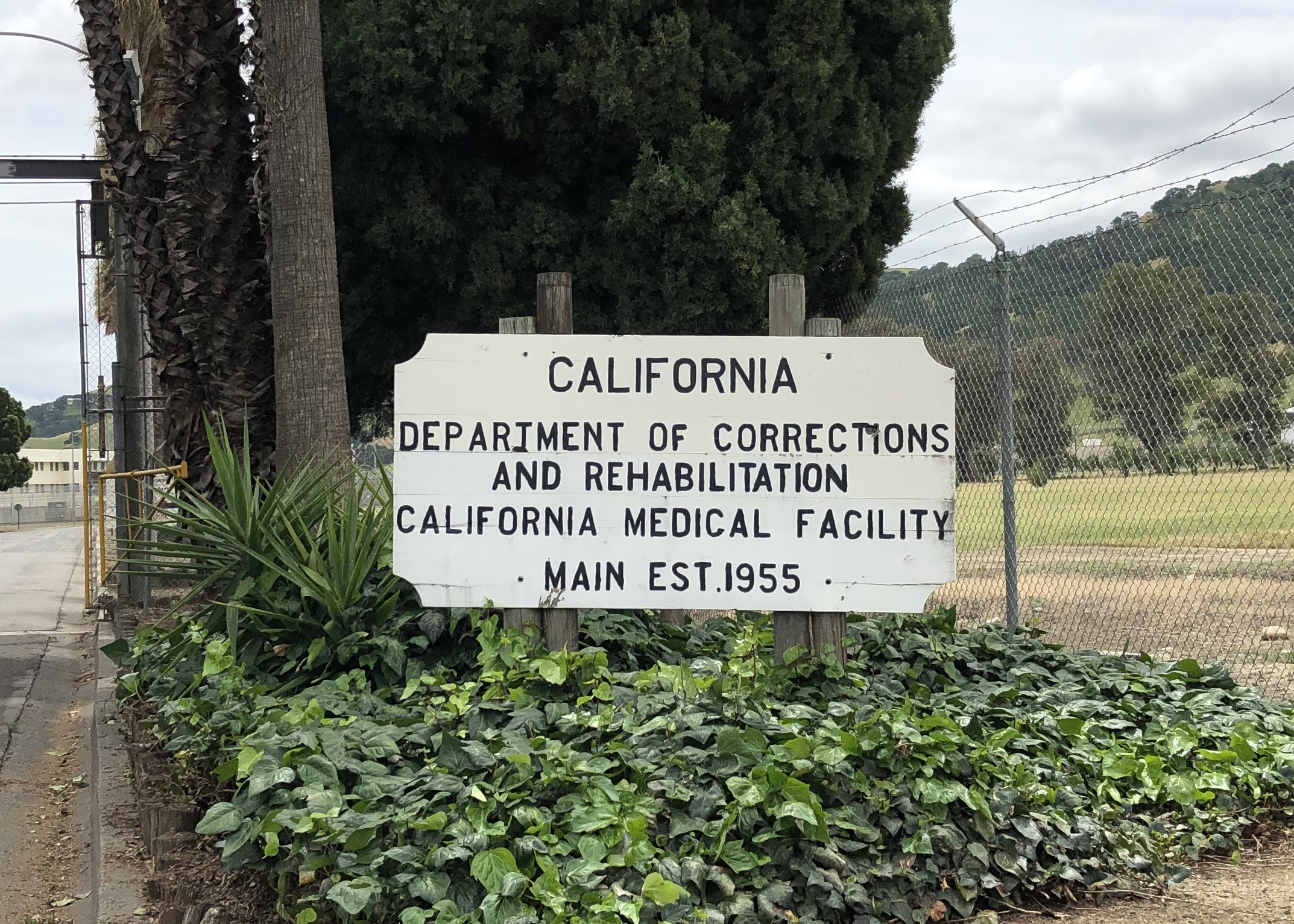
California Medical Facility entrance sign

CMF opened in 1955.

Among other programs at CMF, the Volunteers of Vacaville began in 1960 as a cooperative effort between the community, staff, and inmates. Inmates who participate in the Volunteers of Vacaville's Blind Project create audiobooks, transcribe books into braille, clean and repair Perkins Brailler machines, and resurface eyeglasses. The initial goal of this organization was to transcribe books onto audiotape for the blind community outside of the prison. The Blind Project has since grown into a nationally and internationally recognized leader in blind services.

In 1984, the California prison system's first AIDS case was treated at CMF, and later the system's first specialized AIDS facilities were developed there.

In the late 1980s and early 1990s, the quality of medical care at CMF was found to be lacking, as evidenced by the following:

- After an investigation, the United States Department of Justice sent a January 1987 letter to then-Governor George Deukmejian stating that CMF "deprive[s] inmates of their right to be free from deliberate indifference to their serious medical needs."
- A 1988 lawsuit charged that CMF was "a filthy, vermin-infested, overcrowded prison," and that medical care there was "grossly inadequate." Although at the time "all inmates in California prisons" with HIV/AIDS were sent to CMF, the suit claimed that "overcrowded housing and medical conditions in the AIDS wing are worse than in the main prison." A 1990 consent decree caused CMF's healthcare to "operat[e] under a separate set of rules and with supervision by a court-appointed expert," but a 1998 agreement "plac[ed] the medical and psychiatric care at the facility under the same rules and guidelines as those affecting the rest of the state prison system."
- A 1989 lawsuit by HIV-infected inmates at CMF claimed that separate housing limited their access to prison services (such as recreation, visitation, and jobs) and subjected them to "unnecessary mental anguish." A consent decree led to a pilot program to integrate up to 30 of the 140 HIV-infected inmates at Vacaville [i.e., CMF] into the prison's general population.
- In spring 1992, the two top HIV specialists at the prison resigned, frustrated by limited resources and what they described as "institutionalized apathy" toward AIDS among inmates." The California State Assembly's Public Safety Committee wrote a 1992 report criticizing the care of inmates with HIV or disabilities at CMF. By January 1993, CMF had embarked on a $5.8 million plan to improve the care of AIDS patients, including "a renovated housing unit, a hospice, an enlarged staff, an ombudsman to hear complaints, warmer clothes and nutritional supplements and sensitivity training for guards.

In 1996 at CMF, a 17-bed, state-licensed hospice began caring for dying inmates which was the first hospice among California prisons. Due to an increasing population of elderly at CMF, a nursing home with 21 beds opened in September 2005 as a pilot program.

== Notable inmates ==
Inmate Name	Register Number	Status	Details
Bobby Beausoleil	B28302	Serving a life sentence; denied parole multiple times.	An associate of the Manson Family who was convicted of the 1969 murder of Gary Hinman.
Edmund Kemper	B52453	Serving a life sentence.	Convicted of murdering 8 people, including his own mother, in the early 1970s.

- Rodney Alcala - Serial killer known as the Dating Game Killer. Convicted in 1971 for child molestation. Paroled in 1974.
- Richard Chase – Serial killer known as The Vampire of Sacramento. Chase was transferred from San Quentin State Prison in December of 1979. In April 1980 he was transferred from CMF back to San Quentin.
- David Carpenter – Serial killer known as the Trailside Killer. Spent time at CMF in the 70s for rape, kidnap, and robbery.
- Charles Ng – Serial killer convicted of killing 11 people, sentenced to death in 1999. Transferred from San Quentin State Prison to CMF due to death row being dismantled and a moratorium being in place
- Steven Allen Abrams (born 1961) – perpetrator of the Costa Mesa school car attack
- William R. Bradford (1946–2008) – Murderer and suspected serial killer; died at CMF in 2008
- Juan Corona (1934–2019) – Serial killer; spent "part of his time" after his first 1973 conviction at CMF.
- John Lee Cowell, murderer of Nia Wilson
- Richard Allen Davis (born 1954) – Career criminal and murderer of Polly Klaas; was at CMF twice. In 1974, after being arrested for burglary, he was sent to CMF "for a 90-day diagnostic study." He was also sentenced to spend six years in CMF for a separate burglary beginning August 1975, but was "paroled a year later."
- Donald DeFreeze (1943–1974) – Leader of the Symbionese Liberation Army (SLA), was incarcerated at CMF from 1969 until he was transferred to Soledad State Prison in 1972.
- Jim B. Gordon (1945–2023) – Musician, member of Derek and the Dominos; murdered his mother in 1983. Died in March 2023.
- Eric Ronald Holder Jr. (born 1989) – Holder was sentenced in July 2022 to at least 60 years in prison for the killing of rapper Nipsey Hussle. On March 31, 2019, Holder approached Hussle in a parking lot near the Marathon Clothing store in south Los Angeles. After a brief conversation, Holder left but returned minutes later with two handguns, opening fire and killing Hussle, and injuring two others. Holder fled the scene but was later captured attempting to check into a mental health facility. The California Department of Corrections and Rehabilitation set a November 2039 parole date for Holder.
- Timothy Leary (1920–1996) – Psychologist; served time at CMF in 1973–1974 "for possession of marijuana and escape from a minimum-security prison at San Luis Obispo i.e. California Men's Colony.
- Charles Manson (1934–2017) – Leader of the Manson family cult; was transferred from Folsom State Prison to CMF in March 1974 based on "deterioration of his mental condition"; he was returned to Folsom in October 1974. He was again transferred to CMF in May 1976 where he stayed for over nine years, which was noted as a special favor by prison counselor and friend Edward George. While at CMF, Manson gave his first notable interview on June 13, 1981, to Tom Snyder for NBC's The Tomorrow Show. In September 1984, "following a dispute about ... Hare Krishna religious chanting," a fellow inmate "doused [Manson] with paint thinner and set [him] afire," causing "second-and third-degree burns on the head, face and hands." Manson was transferred to San Quentin State Prison in July 1985. Recordings made by Manson at the facility during 1983–84 were released on a vinyl LP by Ben Gurecki in 2013.
- Dan Montecalvo (1941–2013) – Murdered his wife in 1988; died in 2013
- Roy Norris (1948–2020) – Serial killer and one of the two "Toolbox Killers"; died at CMF in 2020 a week after his transfer.
- Kenneth Parnell (1931–2008) – Convicted of the 1972 kidnapping of seven-year-old Steven Stayner, died there in 2008.
- Edgar H. Smith (1934–2017) – Murderer who once convinced William F. Buckley into championing his cause, was incarcerated at CMF for the last few years of his life, dying there in 2017.
- Theodore Streleski (born 1936) – Murderer; was released unconditionally from CMF in September 1985 after 7 years and 20 days there.
- Brandon Tholmer (born 1949) – Serial killer
- Erwin Walker – WW2 veteran convicted of murder and several shootouts; paroled in 1974
- Karl F. Werner (born 1952) – Serial killer
- Thero Wheeler (1945–2009) – Member of the SLA; escaped in 1973
- Herbert Mullin (1947–2022) – Serial Killer who operated around the same time as Edmund Kemper
- Bruce M. Davis (1942-2026) - member of the Manson Family who participated in the murders of Gary Hinman and Donald “Shorty” Shea. Was in several prisons over his 50-year-plus incarceration; died at Vacaville.
