= Star-ving =

Web series

- Genre: Comedy
- Created by: Todd Bringewatt; David Faustino; Corin Nemec
- Directed by: Sam Kass
- Starring: David Faustino; Corin Nemec
- Country of origin: United States
- Original language: English
- No. of seasons: 1
- No. of episodes: 12

Production
- Executive producers: Todd Bringewatt; David Faustino; Sam Kass; Corin Nemec
- Running time: 8 to 10 minutes
- Production companies: F.N.B. Entertainment; Sony Pictures Television

Original release
- Network: Crackle
- Release: January 16 – March 13, 2009

Star-ving is a comedy web series of episodes running eight to ten minutes, based very loosely on the life of David Faustino. His co-star is Corin Nemec, who played the title character in Parker Lewis Can't Lose. The start date for the episodes was January 16, 2009. The series is a production of FNB Entertainment LLC in association with Sony Pictures Television, webcast on Crackle.

== History ==
In 2006, Faustino and his writing partners, Corin Nemec and Todd Bringewatt, started a production company called F.N.B. Entertainment. In 2007, they wrote a two-page treatment for Star-ving, which they took to director Sam Kass, a former writer and producer on Seinfeld. After shooting the pilot, they took it to Crackle, where twelve webisodes were ordered. In the series, "Faustino plays an exaggerated version of himself — he's broke, can't find a job and his wife has left him for Coolio." Faustino has said of the show, "We don't push the envelope, we're shredding it."

== Cast ==
- David Faustino: The star. It's been ten years since Married... with Children ended and he is frustrated with his lot in life. He is "freakishly short" and his only source of income is from a porn shop left to him by a crazed, deceased fan.
- Corin Nemec: Faustino's sidekick. He is also broke, despite his three seasons as star of Parker Lewis Can't Lose. He helps Faustino run the porn shop.

Faustino's Married... with Children co-stars, Katey Sagal, Christina Applegate and Ed O'Neill, make cameo appearances in the series as themselves.

== Episodes ==
No.	Title	Original release date
1	"Begging Ed"	January 16, 2009
David Faustino tries to solicit money from former co-star Ed O'Neill, with no help from Corin.
2	"Gilbert's Kid"	January 16, 2009
David babysits Sparky, Gilbert Gottfried's 34-year-old mentally challenged adopted son.
3	"Straight Outta Compton"	January 16, 2009
Coolio saves Dave from an angry black mob that Corin knows well.
4	""Married with Children"..The Movie"	January 23, 2009
Dave's big chance to play his old role is usurped by Seth Green. The rest of the 'family' likes the idea.
5	"The Scheize Flick"	January 23, 2009
Dave gets an offer to make a film in Germany. After celebrating with Ron Jeremy, he arrives to find he'll be doing more than 'brown-nosing' on the set.
6	"Just One Drink"	January 30, 2009
Executives from 'The Network' including Ahmed Best (Jar Jar Binks from Star Wars) offer Dave a show. But then Dave downs a beer to commemorate the occasion, and things go south.
7	"Starving…Literally"	February 6, 2009
Dave and Corin run into all kinds of trouble trying to find something to eat, some involving Kato Kaelin.
8	"Going O.J."	February 13, 2009
When the porn shop needs cash to survive, Dave, his mom, and Corin travel to Las Vegas to steal back some unusual memorabilia.
9	"Stealing Alan Thicke"	February 20, 2009
Kidnapping Alan Thicke to extort money from his pop star son does not turn out like Dave and Corin thought it would.
10	"El Al-Qaeda"	February 27, 2009
Ed Asner plays twins in the episode, one a therapist, the other the head of a major foreign studio. Things are looking up for Dave and Corin until a misunderstanding takes place.
11	"Getting Huge"	March 6, 2009
After an ill-fated trip to the gym, during which Dave happens upon his ex-wife and Coolio doing some inappropriate stretching, a locker room encounter turns ugly.
12	"Deliverance"	March 13, 2009
Corin decides that he and Dave need a vacation, so they visit Corin's cousins in Kentucky and somehow wind up working in a meth lab.
