= Corin Nemec =

American actor

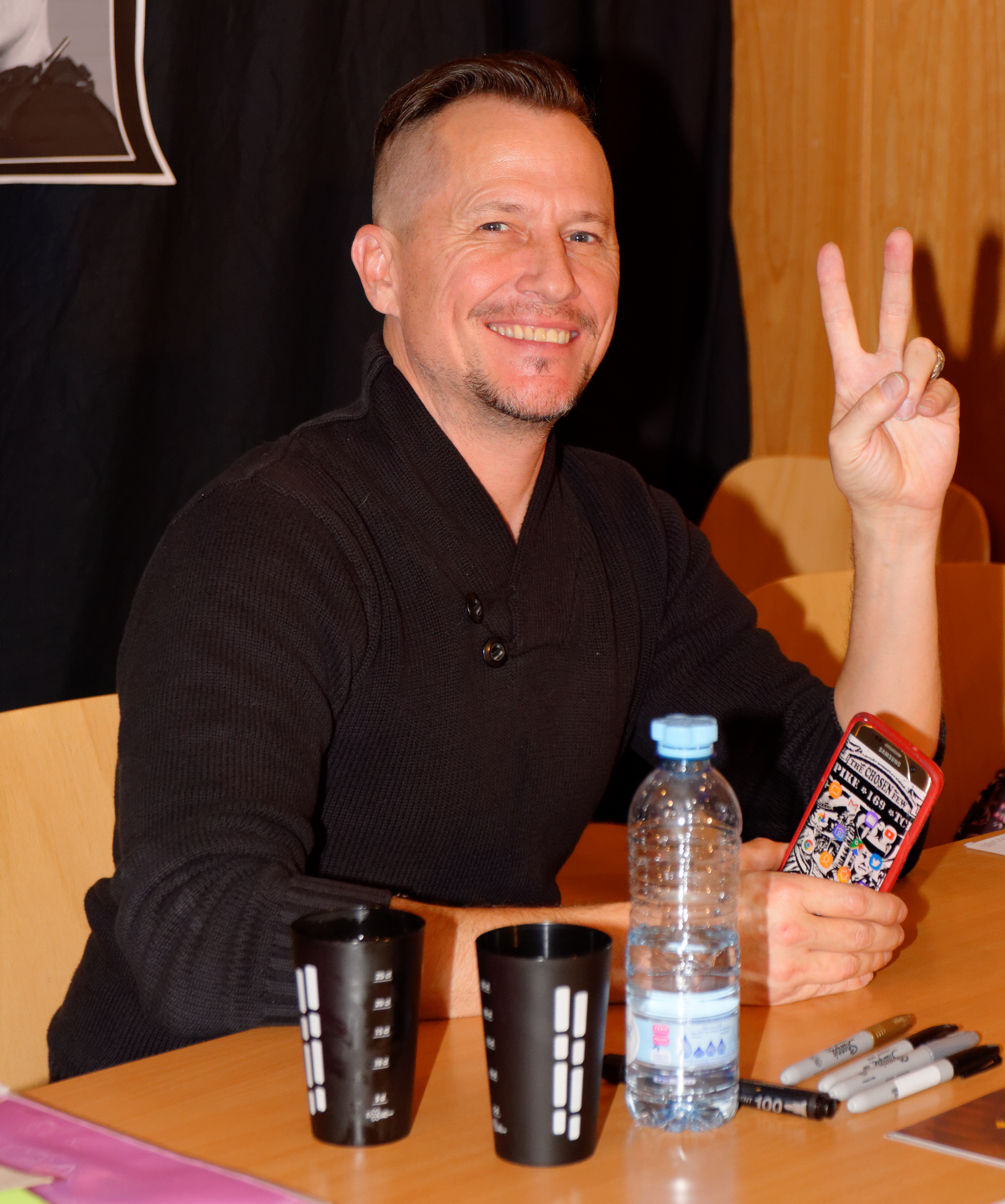
- Nemec at the SF-Connexion, 2018
- Born: Joseph Charles Nemec IV; November 5, 1971 (age 54); Little Rock, Arkansas, U.S.
- Other name: Corky
- Occupation: Actor
- Years active: 1983–present
- Known for: Parker Lewis Can't Lose; What's Alan Watching?
- Height: 6 ft 0 in (183 cm)
- Spouses: Jami Beth Schahn (m. 2002; div. 2009) Sabrina Nova Tropf (m. 2023)
- Children: 2

Joseph Charles Nemec IV (/ˈnɛmɛk/; born November 5, 1971), known professionally as Corin Nemec, is an American actor, producer, screenwriter and graffiti artist. He was billed as Corin "Corky" Nemec or Corky Nemec until 1990. His most prominent roles were the television movie playing Steven Stayner in I Know My First Name is Steven (1989), as the title character in the sitcom Parker Lewis Can't Lose (1990–1993), Jonas Quinn in the science fiction series Stargate SG-1, and Harold Lauder in Stephen King’s miniseries The Stand. He is known in India for his role as Allan in 2007 film Parzania.

== Early life ==
Nemec was born on November 5, 1971 in Arkansas. His mother Janis was a graphic artist, painter, poet and writer. His father, Joseph Charles Nemec III, is of Czech descent, and has worked in the film industry as a set designer and production designer. His older sister, Anastacia C. Nemec, has worked as an assistant director.

Nemec was inspired to become an actor after watching the children's film The Goonies at the age of 13, for which his father had done the art direction. He also cites his parents' artistic professions as a major influence, and that acting "seemed the right thing to do".

As a teenager, Nemec became involved in the graffiti scene as well with street gangs.

== Career ==
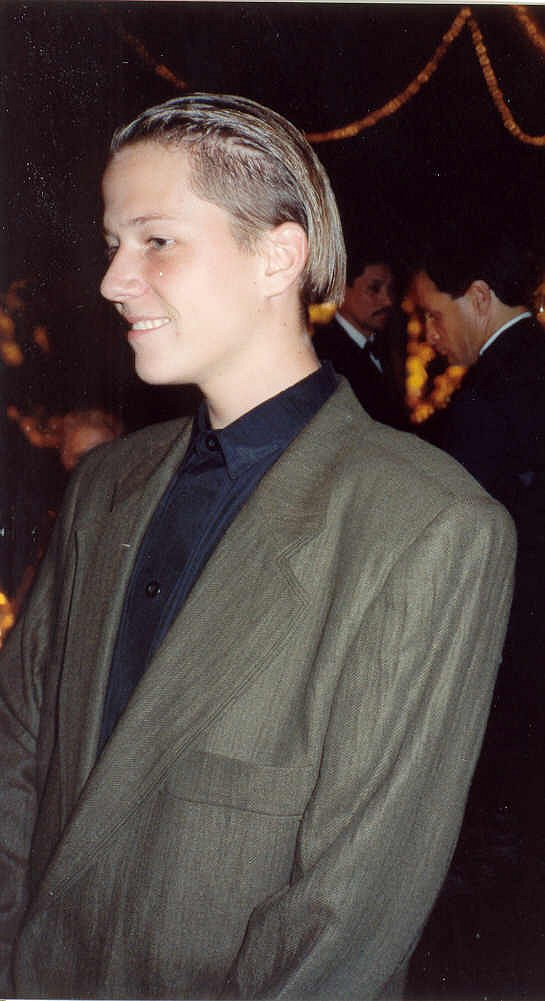
Nemec at the 41st Primetime Emmy Awards in 1989

Nemec began training with the Centre Stage LA theater company and signed on with an agent after performing in one of its talent showcases. He was booked for several commercials, such as Suzuki, and landed a guest-spot on the TV show Sidekicks starring Ernie Reyes Jr., with whom Nemec remained friends. His first major film role was Tucker: The Man and His Dream in 1988. He appeared in several TV shows, earning an Emmy nomination for his portrayal of Steven Stayner in the NBC miniseries I Know My First Name Is Steven. He starred alongside Jack Palance, Peter Boyle, and Charlton Heston in the 1990 feature film Solar Crisis.

Nemec played the lead in the TV series Parker Lewis Can't Lose from 1990 to 1993. Also, in 1993, Nemec was cast as Harold Lauder in a TV adaptation of Stephen King's The Stand. In 1997, he played a notable role in the movie Goodbye, America. He also starred in the TV movies My Brother's Keeper alongside Jeanne Tripplehorn and Blackout with Jane Seymour.

Nemec made appearances on several TV shows, including Tales from the Crypt, Smallville, CSI: NY, CSI: Miami, Supernatural, and Ghost Whisperer. He also portrayed the serial killers Richard Speck and Ted Bundy. He played leading parts in some original Sci Fi Channel (United States) made-for-TV movies such as Sea Beast, Mansquito, SS Doomtrooper, Dragon Wasps, and Lake Placid vs. Anaconda and some original movies for Lifetime (TV network).

During the 1990s, Nemec had a brief foray into hip hop, recording an entire album with the group Starship of Foolz, developed by Matt Robinson and Dedra Tate, and produced by actor Balthazar Getty. Nemec produced a new comedy series that starred comedian Paul Mooney, father of fellow Starship of Foolz member Shane Mooney, as the President of the United States. He appeared in the music video "Beer for My Horses" by Toby Keith and Willie Nelson.

In 2002, Nemec made a guest appearance in season 5 of Stargate SG-1 playing Jonas Quinn, a human scientist from Kelowna. During that season Michael Shanks, then playing Daniel Jackson, had grown tired of his character being sidelined, and was killed off late in the season, with his role being replaced by Quinn and Nemec. Shanks’ departure saw outrage from fans of the show, and as such Nemec was poorly received. Shanks and the studio eventually made a deal, and Jackson was resurrected in season 7 to re-replace Quinn. Nemec as Quinn made a guest appearance teaming up with Jackson in season 7, but the character wasn’t seen again after that episode in 2004.

With his close friend, actor David Faustino of television sitcom Married... with Children, he has a production company that co-produced the debut album from Austin-based band Hollow, featuring Jon Dishongh. Nemec and Faustino co-starred in Star-ving, a web series that spoofs HBO's Entourage.

== Other pursuits ==
Nemec is a well-known graffiti artist, helping to pioneer graffiti writing styles and practices in the San Fernando Valley, starting in the late 1980s.

Nemec has authored a novel, Venice High (2018, ISBN 9781387530656), self-published through Lulu Publishing and its website.

== Personal life ==
Corin married Jami Beth Schahn in 2002. They first dated as teenagers. In 1993, their first child Sadie Joy was born. Their second child Lucas Manu was born in 2005. Although they divorced in 2009, they share custody of their children.

In January 2013, while working on the film Poseidon Rex, Nemec was involved in a boating accident in Belize. While he was being transported to set aboard a Belize Coast Guard vessel, the boat ran into a semi-submerged barge. The entire right side of his body was shattered. He required multiple blood transfusions to save his life, and he underwent five surgeries.

On September 22, 2022, the Tampa Bay Times reported Corin was moving to the Tampa Bay area to begin production on a series of independent films with Scatter Brothers Productions, and met his girlfriend Sabrina Nova Tropf on set. Nemec and Tropf were married in July 2023 in St. Petersburg, Florida. Former pro wrestler, actor and media personality Hulk Hogan attended the wedding, where he proposed to his girlfriend, the bride's best friend, Sky Daily.

== Filmography ==
=== Film ===
Year	Title	Role	Notes
1988	Tucker: The Man and His Dream	Noble Tucker	
1990	Solar Crisis	Mike Kelso	
1991	For the Very First Time	Michael	TV movie
1991	My Son Johnny	Anthony Cortino	TV movie
1994	The Lifeforce Experiment	Ken Ryan	TV movie
1994	Drop Zone	Selkirk 'Selly' Power	
1994	In the Living Years	Teen Dan Donahue	
1995	Operation Dumbo Drop	Specialist 5 Lawrence Farley	
1996	White Wolves II: Legend of the Wild	Ben Harris	
1996	Summer of Fear	Simon	TV movie
1996	The War at Home	Donald	
1996	Mojave Moon	Car Thief	
1997	Goodbye America	John Stryzack	
1997	The First to Go	Danny Ames	
1998	Silencing Mary	David MacPherson	TV movie
1998	Blade Squad	Cully	TV movie
1998	Legacy	Black	
1998	The Process	Hitler	
1999	Foreign Correspondents	Trevor	
2000	Shadow Hours	Vincent	
2000	Hussy: Life Is Nice 2000	Booker	Short
2001	Blackout	Eric Sessions	TV movie
2001	Killer Bud	Waylon Smythe	
2001	Free	Mark	
2002	Brother's Keeper	Ellis Pond	TV movie
2002	Sit and Spin	Mike Gordan	Short
2005	Raging Sharks	Dr. Mike Olsen	Video
2005	Mansquito	Lieutenant Thomas Randall	TV movie
2005	McBride: Murder Past Midnight	Tom Manning	TV movie
2005	Parzania	Allan	
2006	High Hopes	Tom Murphy	
2006	S.S. Doomtrooper	Captain Pete Malloy	TV movie
2006	Hidden Secrets	Micheal Stover	
2007	Chicago Massacre: Richard Speck	Richard Speck	Video
2008	My Apocalypse	Stewart Savage	
2008	Sea Beast	Will McKenna	TV movie
2008	The Boston Strangler	Stuart Whitmore	Video
2008	Marlowe	Clint	
2008	The American Standards	Doc Jennings	
2008	Shattered!	Jordan	
2009	Bundy: A Legacy of Evil	Ted Bundy	Video
2009	RoboDoc	Dr. Callaby	
2009	Privateer	Andrew Jackson	Short
2010	House of Bones	Quentin French	
2010	Exhibit B-5	Doug	Short
2012	Sand Sharks	Jimmy Green	
2012	Besties	Danny	
2012	Nuclear Family	John	TV movie
2012	Dragon Wasps	John Hammond	TV movie
2013	Jurassic Attack	Colonel Carter	
2013	Dracno	Simon Lowell	
2013	This Magic Moment	Jack	TV movie
2013	Robocroc	Jim Duffy	TV movie
2014	Extinction: Patient Zero	Simmons	
2015	Lake Placid vs. Anaconda	Will 'Tully' Tull	TV movie
2016	Drone Wars	Elias	
2016	Marriage of Lies	Detective Gus	
2017	Girlfriend Killer	Detective Baker	TV movie
2017	Doomsday Device	FBI Agent Cole	TV movie
2017	A Christmas Cruise	Gil	TV movie
2017	This is Christmas	-	TV movie
2018	Snatched	Matt Lewis	TV movie
2018	Rottentail	Peter Cotten/Rottentail	
2018	A Woman's Nightmare	Kevin Peterson	TV movie
2019	Deadly Excursion	David McCarthy	TV movie
2019	The Circuit	-	
2019	The Wrong Stepmother	Michael	TV movie
2019	Puppy Swap: Love Unleashed	Powers	
2019	All Roads to Pearla	Cowboy Loy	
2020	The Wrong Stepfather	Craig	TV movie
2020	Run Hide Fight	Beat Cop	
2020	The Wrong Cheerleader Coach	Jon	TV movie
2021	Deadly Excursion: Kidnapped from the Beach	David McCarthy	TV movie
2021	My True Fairytale	Terry Knight	
2021	Haunted: 333	Robbie Ratcliffe	
2022	Blackwater Blues	Pollux Bennington	Short
2022	EnterFear: The Next Wave	Sea Bass	
2022	Le défi de Noël	Matthew Anderson	
2023	Half Dead Fred	Freddy Nash	
2023	Dead Man's Hand	Red	
2023	Out of Hand	Detective Barnes	
2024	Deadly Justice	Theo	
2024	I Feel Fine.	Donnie Taylor	
2024	Day Labor	Floyd Bernard	
2024	Place of Bones	Calhoun	
Upcoming	Chicken Head	Skip Peterson	

=== Television ===
Year	Title	Role	Notes
1987	Sidekicks	Kyle	Episode: "Just for Kicks"
1987–1988	Webster	Nicky Papadopolis	Recurring Cast: Season 5
1989	I Know My First Name Is Steven	Steven Gregory Stayner/Dennis Parnell	Episode: "Part 1 & 2"
1989	Island Son	Greg Caldwell	Episode: "Role Models"
1990–1993	Parker Lewis Can't Lose	Parker Lloyd Lewis	Main Cast
1991	1991 Kids' Choice Awards	Himself/Host	Main Host
1994	The Stand	Harold Lauder	Main Cast
1994	Tales from the Crypt	Hal	Episode: "Whirlpool"
1995	NYPD Blue	Howie	Episode: "Dirty Laundry"
1997	Beverly Hills, 90210	Derrick Driscoll	Recurring Cast: Season 7
1999	L.A. Doctors	Dr. Dennis DiMayo	Episode: "Immaculate Deception"
2002	Smallville	Jude Royce	Episode: "Zero"
2002–2004	Stargate SG-1	Jonas Quinn	Guest: Season 5, Main Cast: Season 6, Recurring Cast: Season 7
2004	CSI: NY	Todd Camden	Episode: "Night, Mother"
2006	Three Moons Over Milford	Roark	Episode: "Wrestlemoonia"
2007	NCIS	Len Grady	Episode: "Skeletons"
2008	Ghost Whisperer	Masked Man/Paul Eastman	Recurring Cast: Season 3
2008	CSI: Miami	Carl Reston	Episode: "The DeLuca Motel"
2009	Star-ving	Faustino's Sidekick	Main Cast
2010	Supernatural	Christian Campbell	Recurring Cast: Season 6
2013	NCIS: Los Angeles	Anwar Amurov	Episode: "The Chosen One"
2015	Kirby Buckets	Future Kirby	Episode: "The Kirbinator"
2015–2017	Star Trek: Renegades	Captain Alvarez	Guest Cast: Season 1-2
2017	Shooter	Border Patrol Agent	Episode: "That'll Be the Day"

=== Web series ===
Year	Title	Role	Notes
2018-2020	Noob	Tom Pix / Spark	Seasons 9, 10, and 11

=== Music video ===
Year	Artist	Song	Role
2003	Toby Keith & Willie Nelson	"Beer for My Horses"	Detective

== Awards and nominations ==
Organizations	Year	Category	Work	Result	Ref.
Primetime Emmy Awards	1989	Outstanding Supporting Actor in a Limited Series or Special	I Know My First Name Is Steven	Nominated	
