= Montalvo Arts Center =

Historic house in California, United States

- Villa Montalvo
- U.S. National Register of Historic Places
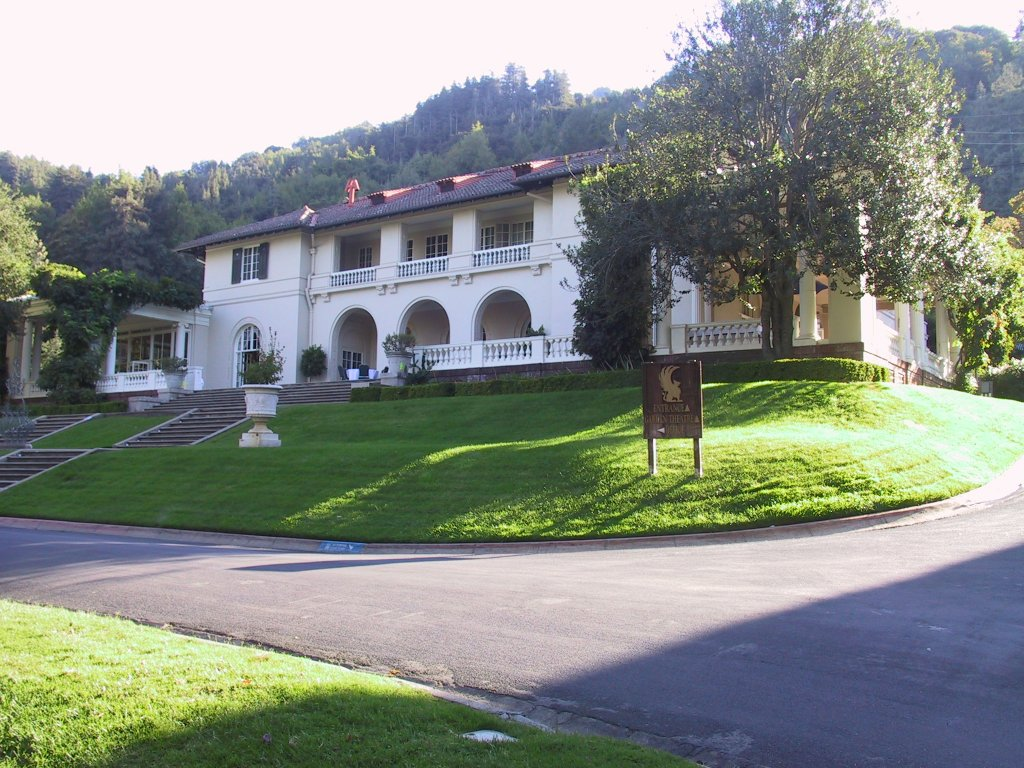
- Villa Montalvo
- Location: 15400 Montalvo Rd., Saratoga, California
- Coordinates: 37°14′26″N 122°1′49″W
- Area: 177 acres (72 ha)
- Built: 1912–14
- Architect: William Curlett; Charles Gottschalk
- Architectural style: Late 19th And 20th Century Mediterranean Revival, Italian-style villa
- Website: montalvoarts.org
- NRHP reference No.: 78000784
- Added to NRHP: May 1, 1978

The Montalvo Arts Center is a non-profit center for the arts in Saratoga, California, United States. Open to the public, Montalvo comprises a cultural and arts center, a park, hiking trails and the historic Villa Montalvo, an Italian Mediterranean Revival mansion nestled in the foothills of the Santa Cruz Mountains. The mansion and estate were constructed from 1912 to 1914 by California statesman and businessman James Duval Phelan. After Phelan's death, the entire estate was donated to California as a park and then a cultural and arts center as it exists today. The arts center maintains the estate in partnership with Santa Clara County. The mansion is a historic landmark, and in 1978 it was awarded inclusion in the National Register of Historic Places.

== Mansion and grounds ==
The grounds of the villa now encompass 175 acres (71 ha), more than the original 160 acres (65 ha) purchased by Phelan. The estate boasts several large structures as well as gardens and untouched natural areas. Montalvo includes two theaters, an art gallery, the historic Villa Montalvo, an artist residency complex called The Sally and Don Lucas Artists Residency Program, hiking trails and gardens.

The mansion itself boasts 19 rooms and two stories. The first floor of the mansion used to host art exhibits, but is now open only for the many weddings and other occasions that are held there.

The grounds include several gardens embellished with marble sculptures and garden structures. The Front Lawn is sometimes used as a theater for some of Montalvo's dramatic presentations, and the woods behind are open to the public. Since its bequest to the people of California, hiking trails through the surrounding Redwood-speckled hills have been added.

== History ==
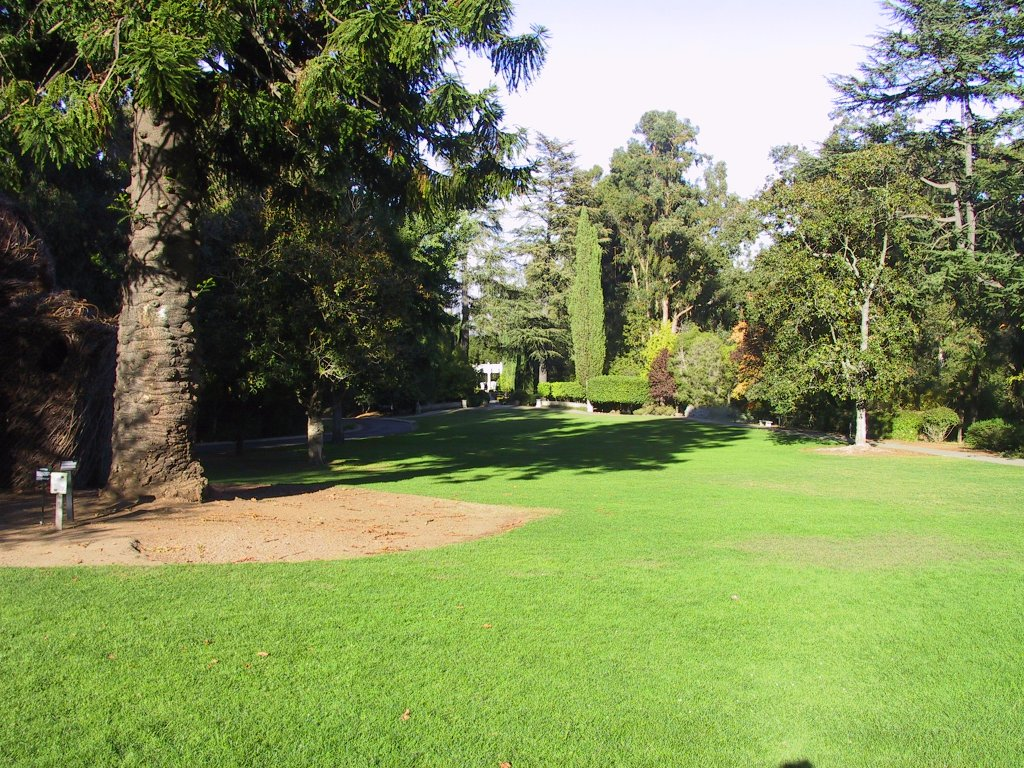
Front lawn of the mansion looking towards the garden. On the left is an artistic display, a hut made from twisted tree branches.

In 1911, James D. Phelan, a three-term mayor of San Francisco who would go on to be California's first popularly elected US Senator, purchased 160 acres (65 ha) in the Saratoga countryside and foothills.

Phelan began construction of the mansion in 1912. The initial supervising architect was William Curlett. When he died in 1914, his son, Alex Curlett, took over supervision along with partner Charles E. Gottschalk. The construction of the building was completed that same year.

During his lifetime, Phelan hosted many celebrities and notables of the era as guests at Montalvo. Jack London, Ethel Barrymore, Mary Pickford, Douglas Fairbanks, and Edwin Markham were among Phelan's many guests. Though not his only home, Villa Montalvo was one of Phelan's favorites and is where he died. Some photographs, correspondence, and other mementos of his life are displayed in cases in the mansion's library and can be viewed if one happens to be attending an event for which the mansion is open.

Upon his death, Phelan bequeathed Montalvo thus:

I would like the property at Saratoga, California, known as Villa Montalvo, to be maintained as a public park open under reasonable restrictions, the buildings and grounds immediately surrounding the same to be used as far as possible for the development of art, literature, music, and architecture by promising students.

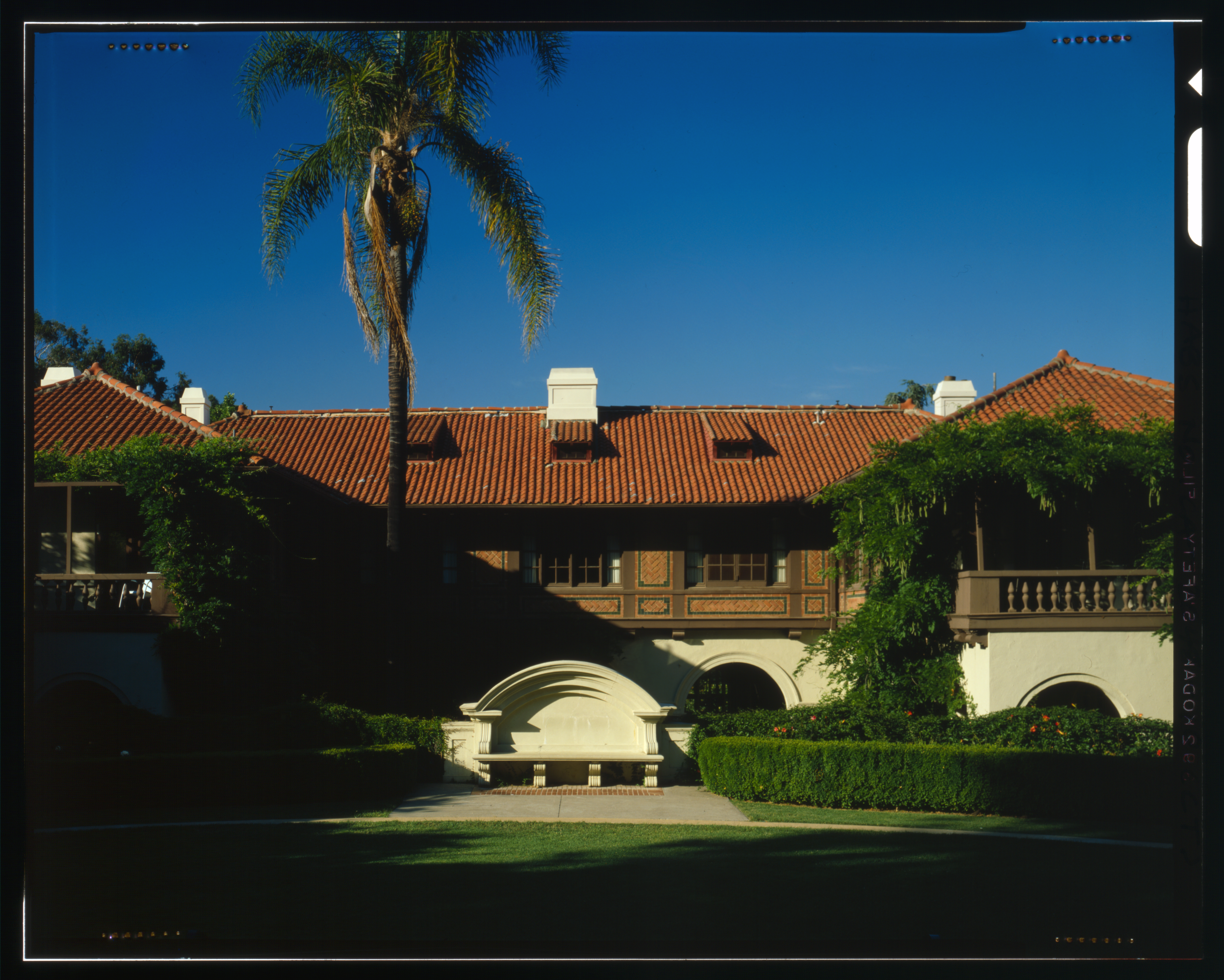
South front from oval garden at Villa Montalvo

The San Francisco Art Association (SFAA) assumed trusteeship of the estate in 1930. Within a year the association announced the intention to launch an artist residency program, the third program of its kind in the United States. The program began in 1939 with ten artists in residence. In 2004 it became the Montalvo Art Center's Sally and Don Lucas Artists Residency Program with 10 newly designed discipline specific live/work studios and a commons building.

After World War II, a shift in priorities for the SFAA left many people concerned about the future of Villa Montalvo. These citizens together formed the Montalvo Association. Trusteeship was transferred to the organization in October 1953. In 2024, the organization website uses the name Montalvo Arts Center.

On April 11, 1971, serial killer Karl F. Werner murdered his third and final victim, Kathy Bilek, 18, on the grounds of Villa Montalvo. It was the investigation into the Bilek slaying which led to his arrest and conviction for his string of three slayings of teenage girls throughout the southern Santa Clara Valley.

== Montalvo Association ==
Today, the Montalvo Arts Center is a private non-profit cultural center maintained by the Montalvo Association through a partnership with Santa Clara County. The park and arts center are open to the public. Funding support is provided by the Friends of Montalvo memberships, as well as foundation grants, other private donations, and earned income via ticket sales and rental fees. More than 600 volunteers donate thousands of hours annually to support the arts programs and maintenance of the villa and grounds.

Since 1939, the estate has hosted "artists-in-residence" who live and work on the property. Artists range from musicians, painters, actors, writers and architects. While in residence, the participants produce works and give performances. Since Montalvo started its artists-in-residence program, more than 600 artists from 20 countries have participated, including Karla Diaz. In 2003 the residency program's board found Gordon Knox, who had initiated and run a remarkable arts residency for 11 years, the Civitella Ranieri Foundation at a castle in Umbria, Italy. Knox envisioned and established a new international iteration of the Montalvo artist residency program designed for a new purpose-built residency campus. In the fall of 2004, Montalvo opened the Sally and Don Lucas Artists Programs, which offer facilities and staff that are supportive of the creative process as well as state-of-the-art technology.

A small gallery, called the Project Space Gallery, as well as the box office, are located in the building between the mansion and the Carriage House Theatre. Montalvo and its arts programs serve nearly 200,000 visitors each year.

== Arboretum ==
Still called "Villa Montalvo" by local area residents, the Montalvo Arts Center hosts a 137-acre (55 ha) arboretum and botanical garden, located behind the center. It is free and open to the public during daylight hours and run as part of a non-profit organization for art, artists, and the local community.

The arboretum is adjacent to the villa and is an Audubon Society bird sanctuary. There are dirt paths leading out of a redwood canyon to Lookout Point at altitude 1,200 feet (370 m). A number of forest types are represented, including chaparral, evergreen, and redwood. Trees native to the Santa Cruz Mountains include bay, California nutmeg, Douglas fir, big-leaf maple, tanoak, and coast live oak. Other plants common in the area are broom, mountain mahogany, chamise, coyote brush (Baccharis pilularis), madrone, manzanita, monkey flower, pitcher sage, poison oak, and toyon.

== Name ==
Phelan named Villa Montalvo in honor of the popular 16th-century Spanish writer Garci Ordonez de Montalvo. Montalvo coined the name "California" in one of his fables. In it he described an island rich with gold and jewels, peopled by Amazons ruled by a queen named Calafia. The Amazons in the fable employed griffins in battle. Images of griffins can be found throughout the arts center grounds, "standing guard".
