= Karl F. Werner =

American serial killer

- Born: Karl Francis Werner; May 12, 1952; Marlborough, Massachusetts, U.S.
- Died: May 5, 2015 (aged 62); Vacaville, California, U.S.
- Conviction: First degree murder (3 counts)
- Penalty: Life Imprisonment

Details
- Victims: 3
- Span of crimes: 1969–1971
- Country: United States
- State: California
- Imprisoned at: California Medical Facility, Vacaville, California

Karl Francis Werner (May 12, 1952 – May 5, 2015) was an American serial killer who was active in Santa Clara County in Northern California. He was convicted of the murder of three teenage girls during his period of activity from 1969 to 1971.

== Furlong/Snoozy slayings ==
On August 3, 1969, the bodies of 14-year-old Debra Gaye Furlong and 15-year-old Kathie Reyne Snoozy were found on a hillside in southern Almaden Valley. Both girls had left their San Jose homes earlier that day to picnic at this location; their fully clothed bodies were found the same evening in a wooded knoll overlooking their homes. Neither girl had been sexually assaulted, and investigators initially theorized they had been killed at a separate location due to the lack of blood at the crime scene.

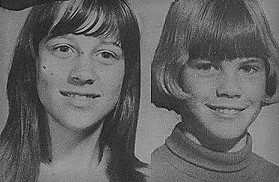
Debra Gaye Furlong (left) and Kathie Reyne Snoozy.

According to Santa Clara County Medical Examiner Dr. John E. Hauser, the girls had died in a "frenzied flurry of knife wounds," with more than 200 wounds found upon Kathie Snoozy, and more than 100 found upon Furlong. All the wounds found on each girl had been inflicted above the waist, and neither girl's body bore evidence of resistance to her assailant. Dr. Hauser would further remark that despite his having been a coroner for many years, he had never encountered a case in which so many knife wounds had been inflicted.

== Bilek slaying ==
On Sunday, April 11, 1971, Kathy Bilek, 18, visited Villa Montalvo, in Saratoga, with the intent to read and engage in birdwatching in the seclusion of a remote, wooded portion of the park, near a small stream. Her body was found the next day by her father, Charles, while Santa Clara County Sheriff's deputies searched nearby. She had been stabbed 17 times in the back, and 32 times in her chest and stomach, although her killer had taken care to avoid stabbing her breasts.

== Aftermath ==
Bilek was murdered in the Villa Montalvo park in Saratoga. A park maintenance man who had seen the assailant and knew him to be "a little odd" was able to give police the name of Oak Grove High School graduate and San Jose City College student Karl F. Werner of San Jose. Werner was a student and classmate of the first two victims. According to a girl who dated him, he was "accomplished in mathematics" and not a "weird, skulking guy that we picture as a serial killer."

Werner had previously been a suspect in an unsolved knife assault on another woman. A search warrant was obtained, and the knife used in the Bilek murder was located on the premises of the Werner residence. The local authorities had already drawn a connection between the 1969 Furlong/Snoozy slayings and the Bilek murder, calling the latter "a carbon-copy killing." In September, Karl F. Werner confessed to the murders of Furlong, Snoozy, and Bilek, and received a life sentence.

Initially, San Francisco police Inspector Dave Toschi suspected the Zodiac Killer may have perpetrated the Furlong/Snoozy murders. At the time of his arrest, it was considered that Karl F. Werner was the infamous Zodiac; however, it was subsequently determined that Werner had been residing in Marlborough, Massachusetts, at the time of some of the earlier Zodiac slayings. Werner was incarcerated at California Medical Facility in Vacaville. He died in 2015.

== See also ==
- List of serial killers in the United States
