= William Bradford (murderer) =

American serial killer

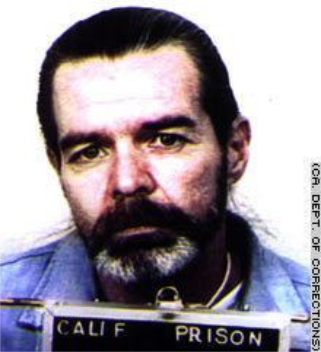
- Inmate mugshot
- Born: William Richard Bradford; May 18, 1946; Pleasanton, California, U.S.
- Died: March 10, 2008 (aged 61); California Medical Facility, Vacaville, California, U.S.
- Other name: The Death Row Poet
- Conviction: First degree murder with special circumstances (2 counts)
- Penalty: Death

Details
- Victims: 2 convictions, 28+ suspected
- Country: United States
- State: California

William Richard Bradford (May 18, 1946 – March 10, 2008) was an American convicted murderer and suspected serial killer and serial rapist who was incarcerated in San Quentin State Prison for the 1984 murders of his 15-year-old neighbor Tracey Campbell and barmaid Shari Miller. In July 2006, the Los Angeles County Sheriff's Department released a compilation of photos found in Bradford's apartment in the 1980s, depicting 54 different women in modelling poses. As Bradford had used the promise of a modelling career to lure his known victims, and taken pictures of Miller before murdering her, police believe many of the photos depict Bradford's other victims in the moments before their deaths. Bradford died at the Vacaville prison medical facility on March 10, 2008, of natural causes.

== Crimes ==
In July 1984, while out on bail and awaiting trial for rape, Bradford met Shari Miller, a barmaid at a Los Angeles establishment called "The Meet Market". Bradford told her that he was a professional photographer and offered to help her build a modeling portfolio. He took her to a remote campsite in the deserts north of Los Angeles (the site of the alleged rape for which Bradford was awaiting trial), photographed her in a variety of modelling poses, and then strangled her.

After killing Miller, Bradford sliced off her tattoos and removed her blouse. He then transported her body to a Hollywood parking lot, where he dumped the corpse in an adjoining alley. When the body was found, it had no identification, leading Miller to be labeled "Jane Doe #60".

Shortly thereafter, Bradford convinced his 15-year-old neighbor Tracey Campbell that she could be a model and took her to the desert campsite, where he likewise photographed and strangled her. Bradford left her body there, covering her face with Shari Miller's blouse.

== Arrest ==
Bradford came under suspicion when investigators learned that he had been the last person to see Tracey Campbell. This, coupled with his pending rape trial, compelled police to obtain a search warrant for Bradford's apartment; inside, they found the photos of Miller and Campbell, along with an assortment of 54 other photos of unidentified women. Police recognized the photos of Miller as "Jane Doe #60" and arrested Bradford on suspicion of murder; using a rock formation visible in one of the photos of Miller, police were able to locate the camp site in the desert where the murders had occurred. Upon searching the site, police found Campbell's decomposed body behind the rock formation. Shortly thereafter, Bradford pleaded no contest to the rape charge he was awaiting trial for and was sentenced to eight years in prison.

== Trial and conviction ==
Bradford was put on trial for the murders of Miller and Campbell in 1988, during which he fired his lawyer, opting to act as his own counsel. During the phase of the trial in which Bradford acted as his own attorney, he offered no evidence or arguments as to his innocence. The prosecution identified Bradford as a serial killer during the course of the trial, but offered no information on murders other than Miller and Campbell. In his closing statement, Bradford implied that he had murdered several other women in addition to Campbell and Miller: "Think of how many you don't even know about. You are so right. That's it."

The jury found Bradford guilty of both murders and sentenced him to death.

== Time on death row ==
In 1998, Bradford dropped all of his appeals, claiming that life in San Quentin had become unbearable. Having no legal representation for the past 10 years, Bradford hired a lawyer to help speed the process of his execution, and began writing poems about life in San Quentin. His poetry attracted attention from the press, who dubbed him "Death Row Poet".

Five days before his scheduled execution, Bradford said that he had changed his mind, professing his innocence and declaring that he wanted the execution process to be halted.

== 2006 events ==
In 2006, Los Angeles police suddenly voiced new interest in the Bradford case, releasing a data sheet depicting head shots taken from the photos in Bradford's apartment. Detectives claimed that they believed the women could all be Bradford's victims; since the photos' release, at least one woman, "#28", has been identified, as Donnalee Campbell Duhamel, a woman whose decapitated corpse was found in a canyon in Malibu in 1978. It has been determined that Duhamel met Bradford in a Culver City bar, "The Frigate", a few days before her body was found.

Investigators have also revealed that several of the women have since been identified as Bradford's ex-wives, though no indication has been given that they are dead, or that Bradford is suspected of murdering them.

Another identified photograph is that of Nika LaRue, the sister of actress Eva LaRue. Nika LaRue is number three in the series of released pictures. Both sisters spoke with the Sheriff's Department and were able to give additional information. An episode of Eva LaRue's series CSI: Miami' ("Darkroom") is based on this case.

The "vast majority" of the women in the photos remain unidentified, and are all viewed as possible rape and/or murder victims. Police are encouraging that the photos be distributed nationwide, as Bradford spent time in Michigan, Florida, Texas, Oregon, Illinois, Kansas and Louisiana, and faced criminal charges in several of those states. In 1978 he faced criminal charges for sexually assaulting his wife in Michigan, and in 1980 was accused of sexual assault in Valparaiso, Florida.

Bradford was also linked to the murder of a 23-year-old man named Mischa Stewart, who was last seen leaving a gay bar in Santa Monica on the night of October 8, 1982. Stewart's body was found in an alley the following morning, and his cause of death was determined to be ligature strangulation.

== See also ==
- List of serial killers in the United States
