= I Know My First Name Is Steven =

1989 television miniseries

- Genre: Drama
- Written by: Mike Echols; J.P. Miller; Cynthia Whitcomb
- Directed by: Larry Elikann
- Starring: Cindy Pickett; John Ashton; Corin "Corky" Nemec
- Composer: David Shire
- Country of origin: United States
- Original language: English
- No. of episodes: 2

Production
- Executive producer: Andrew Adelson
- Producer: Kim C. Friese
- Editors: David Ramirez; Peter V. White
- Running time: 91–94 minutes
- Production companies: Andrew Adelson Company; Lorimar Television

Original release
- Network: NBC
- Release: May 22 – May 23, 1989

I Know My First Name Is Steven is a 1989 American television miniseries about kidnapping victim Steven Stayner. The two-part miniseries was first broadcast by NBC on May 22 and 23, 1989. Screening rights were sold to a number of international television companies including the BBC, which screened the miniseries in mid-July of the following year; later still, it was released as a feature-length movie.

It was nominated as Best Miniseries or Television Film at the 47th Golden Globe Awards and received four Emmy Award nominations.

== Plot ==
Steven Stayner, a seven-year-old boy, is kidnapped by Kenneth Parnell, with the help of his partner in crime, Irving Murphy. Parnell continues to molest and produce pornographic images of Steven for seven years.

When Steven is 14, Parnell kidnaps a boy named Timmy. As a result, Steven builds up the courage to prevent Timmy from going through the same thing that he went through when he was Timmy's age. He brings Timmy to the police and confesses that he was the victim of a kidnapping by his "dad", Parnell.

Steven later testifies in court on Timmy's behalf, and then later, in a hearing for the crimes Parnell committed against Steven. Parnell spends five years of a seven-year sentence in prison for the kidnapping and sexual abuse against Steven, while his accomplice Murphy spends less than two years in prison.

== Cast ==
=== Main ===
- Cindy Pickett as Kay Stayner
- John Ashton as Del Stayner
- Cory "Corky" Nemec as Steven Stayner / Dennis Parnell

=== Supporting ===
- Luke Edwards as Steven Stayner (age 7)
- Pruitt Taylor Vince as Irving Murphy
- Ray Walston as Bob Augustine
- Gregg Henry as Officer Kean
- Jim Haynie as Officer Scott
- Amy O'Neill as Jodie
- Barry Corbin as Officer Warner

=== Guest ===
- Peter Michael Goetz as Pat Halford
- Alan Fudge as Chief Johnson
- Todd Eric Andrews as Cary Stayner (age 18)
- Hilary Morse as Cindy Stayner (age 16)
- Shantee Stebins as Jody Stayner (age 12)
- Marice Leeds as Cory Stayner (age 11)
- Harold P. Pruitt as Birch
- Jonathan Perpich as Officer Severeid
- William Frankfather as Judge Sabraw
- John Vickery as George McLure
- James Ingersoll as Joe Allen
- John DeMita as Dan Smith
- Billy Ray Sharkey as Sheriff Suggs
- Shannon Holt as Angela White
- Mark Tymchyshyn as Jim White
- Jason Presson as Deke
- Michael Chieffo as Don
- Whitney Rydbeck as Mr. Craft
- Jacob Gelman as Timmy White
- Natvido Vacio as Vicente
- Scott Reeves as Bruce
- Pamela McMyler as Rosanna
- Ron Tank as TV Journalist
- Andrew Amadore as TV Reporter
- Jeremy McCollum as Kleekie
- David Glasser as Boots
- Robert Balderson as P.E. Teacher
- Gregory "Mars" Martin as Victor (Age 14)
- Wendy Gordon as TV Newscaster
- Darcy DeMoss as Debbie
- Dave Adams as Cashier
- Annie O'Donnell as Official
- Dan Kelpie as Court Officer
- Tiu Leek as Reporter #1
- Kim Maxwell as Reporter #2
- Jeff Olson as Reporter #3
- Bryan Cranston as Officer Dickinson (uncredited)
- Barbara Tarbuck as School Counselor
- Arliss Howard as Kenneth Parnell (uncredited)
- Stephen Dorff as Pete (uncredited)
- Beth Grant as Mrs. Beta (uncredited)

== Ratings ==
Viewership and ratings per episode of I Know My First Name Is Steven
No.	Title	Air date	Timeslot (ET)	Rating/share (households)	Viewers (millions)	Ref(s)
1	"Part 1"	May 22, 1989	Monday 9:00 p.m.	21.6/35	31.3	
2	"Part 2"	May 23, 1989	Tuesday 9:00 p.m.	27.3/42	40.3	

== Accolades ==
Award	Year	Category	Resipian(s)	Result
Casting Society	1989	Mini-Series Casting	Alice Cassidy	Nominated
Golden Globes	1990	Best Miniseries or Television Film		Nominated
Parents' Choice Award	1989	Tv miniseries	Andrew Adelson	Won
Primetime Emmy Awards	1989	Outstanding Miniseries		Nominated
Primetime Emmy Awards	1989	Outstanding Supporting Actor in a Miniseries or a Special	Corin Nemec	Nominated
Primetime Emmy Awards	1989	Outstanding Directing in a Miniseries or a Special	Larry Elikann	Nominated
Primetime Emmy Awards	1989	Outstanding Writing in a Drama Series	"His Suit Is Hirsute" (Note: Written by Steven Bochco, David E. Kelley, Michele Gallery and William M. Finkelstein)	Nominated
Young Artist Award	1990	Best Family TV Movie Pilot or Special		Won
Young Artist Award	1990	Best Young Performer in a TV Movie, Pilot or Special	Corin Nemec	Nominated
