= Brother Tony Leyva =

Tony Leyva
- Born: Mario Ivan "Tony" Leyva Jr. March 1, 1946; Fletcher, North Carolina, United States
- Died: March 3, 2005
- Occupation: Pentecostal preacher

Mario Ivan "Tony" Leyva Jr. (May 1946 – March 3, 2005), most commonly known as Brother Tony Leyva, was a Pentecostal preacher and convicted pederast and child molester.

== Early life ==
Mario Ivan Leyva, Jr., of Cuban descent, was born in Fletcher, North Carolina, in May 1946. "Tony", as he came to be called, was a victim of child molestation himself. As publicly stated, he was molested once during kindergarten and again when he was 14 on a baseball field near his high school. As a child, he enjoyed visiting his grandparents in Flat Rock, North Carolina, and came to live there in his late childhood. He became a Pentecostal preacher at age 17, and married his childhood girlfriend, Tammy Sue.

== Sexual abuse ==
During his teen years and early adult years as a Pentecostal preacher, he found himself attracted to younger boys in his church congregation. He would lure boys aged 10 to 14 years to the back roads of Henderson County, North Carolina, with the promise of teaching them how to drive, but instead perform oral sex on them, calling it "God's special way for his people to love each other." "Brother Tony", as he came to be called, violated dozens of young boys in the area in this way.

During the later 1960s and early 1970s, Leyva turned his attention to religious revivals and traveled across the South. He would invite young boys from both his hometown and towns along his travels to come with him, promising to teach them the ways of the Bible. The boys would earn their way by setting up lights, playing music, or driving tent trucks for Leyva's revival tent. Then, during the night at his motel room in that city, he would molest the boys. The boys' parents were often deceived by his charm, and the boys who were victimized never spoke out of embarrassment. Those who did speak out were often hushed up by disbelief.

== Book ==
Leyva's life as an evangelist and molester are recorded in Mike Echols' book Brother Tony's Boys: The Largest Case of Child Prostitution in U.S. History: The True Story.

== Arrest ==
Along with several other known pederasts, Leyva was arrested several times in 1988 on child molestation, sodomy, and interstate transport of minors charges.

== Life after release ==
After Leyva was released from prison in 2002, he apparently fled to Haiti using forged papers. In August 2003 he was caught and held at the United States Embassy in Port-au-Prince. He was later deported back to the United States.

== Death ==
Leyva died from skin cancer on March 3, 2005, in the infirmary of Powhatan Correctional Center in Virginia. The state medical examiner's office determined he had metastatic melanoma, a form of skin cancer.
