= Mike Echols =

American writer (1944–2003)

- Born: Walter Harlan Echols; April 1, 1944
- Died: January 10, 2003 (aged 58); Monterey County, California, U.S.
- Occupation: Author

Walter Harlan "Mike" Echols (April 1, 1944 – January 10, 2003) was an American author who wrote several books, mainly dealing with child sexual abuse. These include I Know My First Name Is Steven, which chronicles the kidnap of Steven Stayner, and Brother Tony's Boys, which tells the story of Brother Tony Leyva, a Pentecostal revivalist preacher and pederast.

Echols infiltrated NAMBLA and wrote of his experience in I Know My First Name is Steven.

Echols was known for researching the Internet for pedophile chat rooms and forums. In 1998, Echols created Better a Millstone (BAM), a child-safety advocacy group, that identified and reported pedophiles to authorities. BAM's website also listed child porn sites, including web addresses, in an effort to publicly pressure sites' hosts.

Echols died in 2003 at age 58 in the Monterey County Jail in California from an apparent heart attack. He was in jail for failing to appear in court after being charged with indecent exposure for exposing himself to police, among other misdemeanors.
