= NatureBridge =

Nonprofit organization

- Established: 1971
- Purpose: Environmental education
- Headquarters: Sausalito, California, United States
- Region served: California; Washington; Virginia
- President and CEO: Phillip Kilbridge
- Website: https://www.naturebridge.org/

NatureBridge, formerly Yosemite Institute and later Yosemite National Institutes, is an American nonprofit organization founded in 1971 that provides environmental education through field studies. It has programs for elementary, middle, and high school students in four national park locations: Yosemite National Park, Golden Gate National Recreation Area, Olympic National Park, and Prince William Forest Park.

The organization is estimated to serve 30,000 students each year. Its lessons include hiking, laboratory-style experiments, and excursions in the backcountry.

== History ==
The organization was founded in Yosemite National Park in 1971, under the name Yosemite Institute. Its founding was inspired by a student trip to Yosemite led by high school teacher Don Rees in the same year. He consequently became the organization's first Executive Director. Its first board chair was Jack H. Walston, who also served as vice president and director of the Los Angeles-based company Walston and Co. Initial funding was provided by Curry Co. and Yosemite Park itself.

In 1973 Yosemite Institute acquired a special use permit for a blister rust facility in Crane Flat, which it used for longer than was envisioned. This aging facility was replaced with a new building in Henness Ridge in 2002. To reflect its growth beyond Yosemite, the organization changed its name to Yosemite National Institutes in 1984.

NatureBridge partnered with Stanford University, the S.D. Betchel Jr. Foundation, and the Pisces Foundation in 2010 to form the ChangeScale initiative, intended to improve environmental education. In 2012, it merged with the Headlands and Olympic Park Institutes. In August 2020, the organization was forced to terminate 21 already-furloughed employees and shut down its Seattle office due to the COVID-19 pandemic. In an attempt to counter these losses, it subsequently established an online learning program and has since resumed normal programs.

== Awards ==
On Outside magazine's list of best employers for 2011, NatureBridge was ranked at #30.
