= Dan Montecalvo case =

Court case

Daniel John Montecalvo (December 27, 1941 – September 25, 2013) was an American man who was convicted of murdering his wife in March 1988 in Burbank, California, despite a long-standing claim of innocence.

== Conviction ==
On the evening of March 31, 1988, 9-1-1 operators received a call from Dan Montecalvo, an ex-convict in Burbank, California, claiming that he and his wife, Carol, were shot by unknown burglars in their home. Soon after, police arrived; Carol was found dead as result of two gunshot wounds to the neck; Montecalvo was shot once in the lower back. Initially, the authorities believed Montecalvo's story, however, they would later suspect him of being involved due to gambling debts and $600,000 of life insurance he had on his wife.

Although there were no eyewitnesses, and no murder weapon, police brought charges against Montecalvo in March 1990 for first-degree murder. The authorities believed that he shot himself so it would corroborate his story. In November 1990, Montecalvo was convicted of the murder, and was sentenced to 27 years to life in prison.

In 1991, a neighbor named Suzan Brown confessed to burglarizing the home that resulted in the murder of Carol Montecalvo. According to Brown, she and several of her friends spent all of their money on speed and decided to burglarize the Montecalvo residence, assuming that they had gone to a vacation that was planned. However, her confession did not result in any further developments.

== Death ==
On September 25, 2013, Montecalvo died at California Medical Facility due to sepsis.

== Coverage ==
This case was the subject of a book in 1992, entitled Final Vows: Murder, Madness and Twisted Justice in California by author Karen Kingsbury. In 2013, it was re-released.

In 2016, television series The Perfect Murder on Investigation Discovery featured this case, which was entitled "Murder by the Book". In addition, the case was also featured on Unsolved Mysteries.
