= Timothy White (abduction victim) =

American child kidnapping victim (1974–2010)

- Born: Timothy James White; November 1, 1974; Merced, California, U.S.
- Disappeared: February 13, 1980 (aged 5); Ukiah, California, U.S.
- Died: April 1, 2010 (aged 35); Santa Clarita, California, U.S.
- Spouse: Dena
- Children: 2

Timothy James White (November 1, 1974 – April 1, 2010) was an American boy who was abducted in 1980 by pedophile Kenneth Parnell and held for several weeks before he was rescued by fellow child captive 14-year-old Steven Stayner, who escaped and guided the 5-year-old to safety.

== Kidnapping ==
Seven years prior to White's kidnapping, Parnell kidnapped seven-year-old Steven Stayner as he walked home from school. As Stayner aged, Parnell lost interest in him and was motivated to kidnap another younger boy. Parnell enlisted Stayner as an accomplice in a few earlier kidnappings which failed due to Stayner failing to follow directions (Stayner later admitted he intentionally sabotaged the aborted kidnappings in order to spare other children his fate). Thinking Stayner was an incompetent criminal, Parnell cajoled one of Stayner's teenage friends, a local boy named Sean Poorman, into being an accomplice, promising him drugs and money.

On February 13, 1980, Poorman noticed 5-year-old White, who was playing outside his parents' house in Ukiah, California. and ushered him into Parnell's getaway car. When White refused and attempted to run indoors, Poorman shoved the boy against a chain link fence, forced him to loosen his grip, then dragged him kicking and screaming into the car. Parnell made quick work in grooming White, as he had done with Stayner's abduction, repeatedly trying to get White to think his new name was "Tommy". Parnell paid off Poorman with the promised cash and marijuana, then ordered him to leave and never speak of the incident. Parnell also dyed White's blond hair dark brown in order to mask his appearance from the forthcoming missing child posters. Ultimately, Parnell would pass White off as his younger son and Stayner's brother. White forged a bond with Stayner during the 16 days he was held captive and spoke favorably of how the older boy took care of him. Stayner, determined to not see another child suffer the systematic sexual abuse that he endured, sought to return White to his parents.

== Escape ==
On March 1, 1980, Stayner and White escaped while Parnell was at work. Parnell lived in remote backcountry; they walked a quarter of a mile down a road until a passing truck driver took them to Ukiah, California. White was able to direct the driver to a babysitter's house, but no one was home. Since White could not recall where his parents lived, Stayner went to a phone booth and found the address of the Ukiah police station. At the station, Stayner told White to walk inside and tell them who he was. White approached the door, but got scared and ran back to Stayner. Officers observed this, stopped the boys from leaving, and soon learned their identities.

Parnell was convicted of abducting Stayner and White in separate trials. He was sentenced to seven years for the kidnapping of White, and seven months for kidnapping Stayner, and was paroled after five years. Parnell was not charged with sexually assaulting Stayner because those offenses had occurred in another county and were outside the jurisdiction of the Merced County prosecutor. Authorities were satisfied that White had not been sexually assaulted.

The White family maintained contact with the Stayners, and when Stayner died in a motorcycle accident in 1989, a then 14-year-old White was a pallbearer.

== Death ==
White died on April 1, 2010, from a pulmonary embolism, at the age of 35.

On August 28, 2010, a statue of White and Stayner escaping hand in hand was dedicated in Applegate Park in Merced.

== See also ==
- List of long-term false imprisonment cases
