= Capalbo =

Capalbo is an Italian surname. Notable people with the surname include:

- Carla Capalbo, English-American food writer, journalist, and author
- Carmen Capalbo (1925–2010), American theater director
- Marcelo Capalbo (born 1970), Uruguayan basketball coach and former player
- Pablo Miguel Lombroni Capalbo (born 1980), known as Shablo, Argentine-Italian DJ and producer
