= Max Lowenthal =

American political figure (1888–1971)

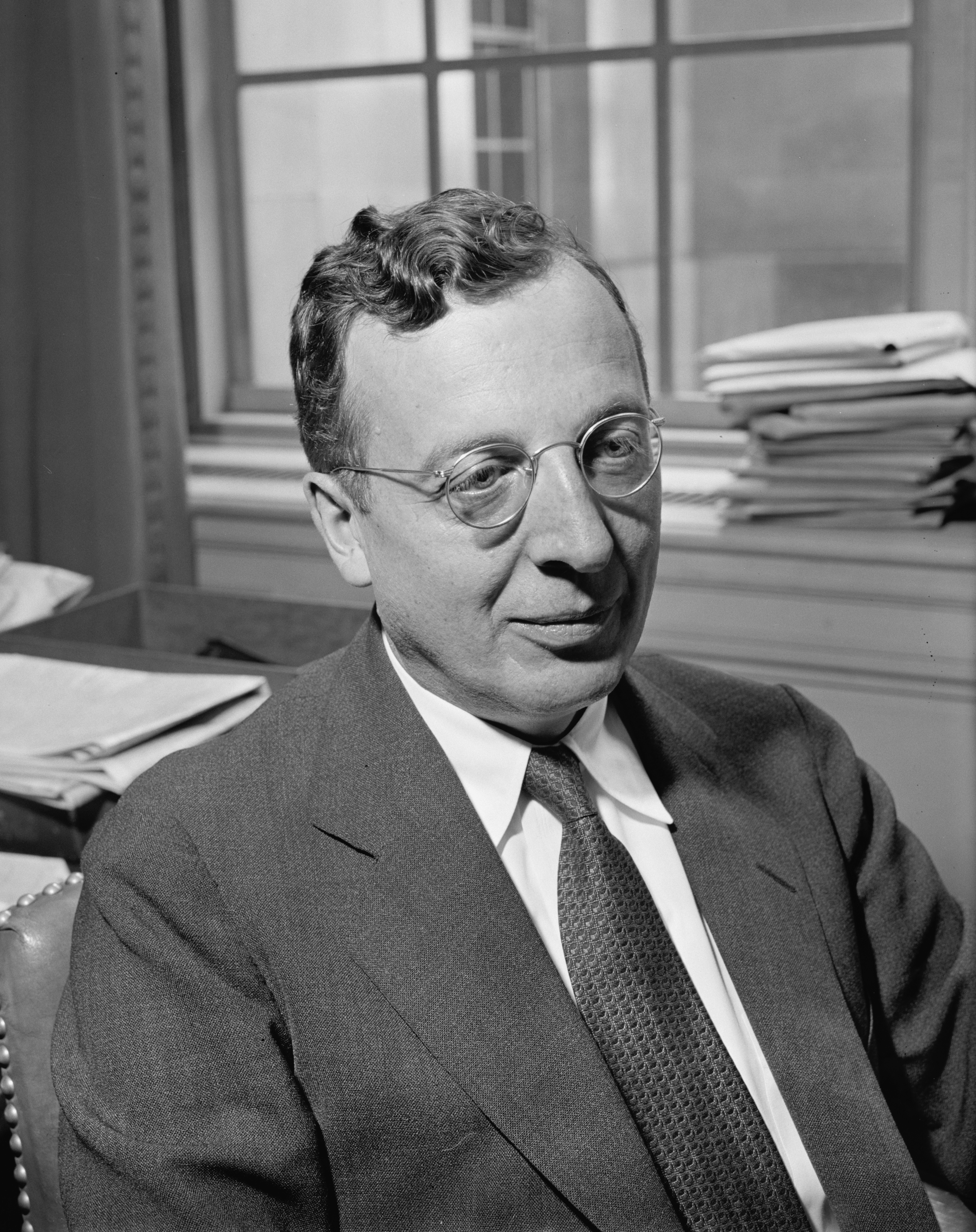
- Max Lowenthal in his Washington office (1939)
- Born: Mordechai Lowenthal; February 26, 1888; Minneapolis, Minnesota, US
- Died: May 18, 1971 (aged 83); New York City, US
- Education: University of Minnesota
- Alma mater: Harvard Law School
- Occupations: Lawyer, government legal counselor
- Years active: 1923–1967
- Known for: Friendship with Harry S. Truman, mentorship of Carol Weiss King
- Notable work: The Federal Bureau of Investigation (1950) (book)
- Children: David Lowenthal, John Lowenthal, Elizabeth Lowenthal
- Relatives: Julian Mack (wife's uncle)
- Family: David Lowenthal and John Lowenthal (sons); Betty Levin (daughter)

Max Lowenthal (February 26, 1888 – May 18, 1971) was a Washington, DC, political figure in all three branches of the federal government in the 1930s and 1940s, during which time he was closely associated with the rising career of Harry S. Truman; he served under Oscar R. Ewing on an "unofficial policy group" within the Truman administration (1947–1952).

== Background ==
Mordechai Lowenthal was born on February 26, 1888, in Minneapolis, Minnesota. In 1870s, his parents Nathan (Naphtali) Lowenthal and Gertrude (Nahamah) Gitel, both Orthodox Jewish, emigrated from Kovno (now Kaunas), Lithuania, to Minnesota. At a young age, he started using the more "American" name of Max. He had two older siblings, of whom only one survived childhood.

He graduated from North High School in 1905, first in his class. He also attended Talmud Torah, where he learned Hebrew. He received a BA in 1909 from the University of Minnesota and graduated in 1912 from Harvard Law School, where he began a lifelong friendship with Felix Frankfurter.

== Career ==
Many of Lowenthal's accomplishments remain unknown, as some continue to be uncovered through historical research. Lowenthal was notably private and often refused to take credit for his accomplishments.

A memo in Lowenthal's FBI file reveals the following chronology (supplemented):

- 1907–1909: Reporter at Minneapolis Journal
- 1912–1913: Law clerk for Judge Julian Mack at $1,800 per annum
- 1913–1914: Law clerk for Cadwalader, Wickersham & Taft (AKA Strong & Cadwalader) at $1,800 per annum
- 1915: Starts own law firm in New York City
- 1917: Clerk or assistant at U.S. Department of State
- 1917–1918: Assistant secretary to U.S. President Woodrow Wilson's Mediation Commission (Morgenthau Mission, recommended by Felix Frankfurter))
- 1918: Informal aid at U.S. Department of War
- 1918–1919: Assistant chairman for War Labor Policies Board to Felix Frankfurter
- 1919–1920: Returns to private practice; defends Sidney Hillman and Amalgamated Clothing Workers in "landmark injunction case"
- 1920–1921: Assistant secretary to Second President's Industrial Congress
- 1920–1929: Partners in Szold Branwen [sic] law firm and becomes a "very wealthy New York lawyer" in Lowenthal, Szold and Brandwen of 43 Exchange Place, New York City. (FTC commissioner John J. Carson later mistakenly recalled one partner as "Max Bramblin" of "Lowenthal & Bramblin")

Lowenthal knew Walter Weyl (father of Ware Group member Nathaniel Weyl), who recommended Adelaide Hasse as a researcher for the War Labor Policies Board.

=== Private law practice ===
Logo of the Russian-American Industrial Corporation, brainchild of Sidney Hillman.

Lowenthal ran a private law practice from 1912 to 1932. Cases involved workers rights, defense of right-to-strike legislation and shareholder rights in receivership cases.

In the early 1920s, Lowenthal seems to have had a law office in New York City. While Ann Fagan Ginger does not mention him as a mentor of Carol Weiss King in her biography of King, Ginger does say that King formed a "loose partnership" with radical attorneys, who included Joseph Brodsky, Swinburne Hale, Walter Nelles, and Isaac Shorr as well as a long-term association with Walter Pollak (once partner of Benjamin Cardozo), whom she met through her brother-in-law Carl Stern. Nevertheless, newspaper accounts of King (in the 1950s) mention Lowenthal as not only an associate but her employer. The Saturday Evening Post went even further in 1951 in a long article on Carol Weiss King:

Lowenthal is of special interest. A product of Harvard Law, he has been described by a New Deal associate as "self-effacing and ubiquitous." Shuttling between New York and Washington, he has maintained a New York office while holding a variety of Government posts dating back to World War I. On one hand, he has been an assiduous cultivator of high-level friendships, including Presidents Roosevelt and Truman and Supreme Court Justices Felix Frankfurter and Louis Brandeis. On the other, he has been an equally assiduous collector of proteges for whom he has found many Government jobs. Alger Hiss and Lee Pressman benefited by his friendship, and, for a time, did one George Shaw Wheeler, a young lawyer who became so carried away by communism that he denounced his United States citizenship to make a new career bebind the Iron Curtain. Back in 1920, at the time of her admission to the New York bar, Carol also was a Lowenthal protégée, and it was in his office that she served her first and only legal clerkship.

Another important protege of Lowenthal's (and his partner Robert Szold) was Benjamin V. Cohen, later known as one of Felix Frankfurter's Hotdogs in the New Deal. Lowenthal and Cohen both knew Judge Julian W. Mack, who was one of Cohen's professor at Harvard (and was uncle of Lowenthal's wife). In October 1920, Cohen first worked for Lowenthal on a bankruptcy case involving E.F. Drew & Company.

In 1923, Lowenthal was general counsel for the Russian-American Industrial Corporation (RAIC) of 31 Union Square, New York City, launched by the Amalgamated Clothing Workers union in 1922, following a 1921 visit to the Soviet Union by union president Sidney Hillman. He was also one of the original directors of the Amalgamated Bank of New York, as advertised in the Liberator magazine. The ad mentions that the bank is owned and operated by the Amalgamated Clothing Workers. It lists chairman Hyman Blumberg, president R. L. Redheffer, vice president Jacob S. Potofsky, cashier Leroy Peterson, and other directors: Hillman, August Bellanca, Joseph Gold, Fiorello H. La Guardia, Abraham Miller, Joseph Schlossberg, Murray Weinstein, Max Zaritzky, and Peter Monat.

The Amalgamated relationship seems to have started when Lowenthal defended Hillman in 1920 in a labor dispute in Rochester, New York. As late as 1929, Lowenthal still had a close relationship with the Amalgamated Bank, as after the Wall Street Crash of 1929 he recommended that the bank sell its securities for cash; throughout the Great Depression, the bank held its assets in cash or cash-equivalents. "It was the advice of Max Lowenthal that helped more than anything else to keep our banks open during the Hoover banking collapse," Hillman later noted. Advising Lowenthal in this period was Benjamin V. Cohen.

=== Government service ===
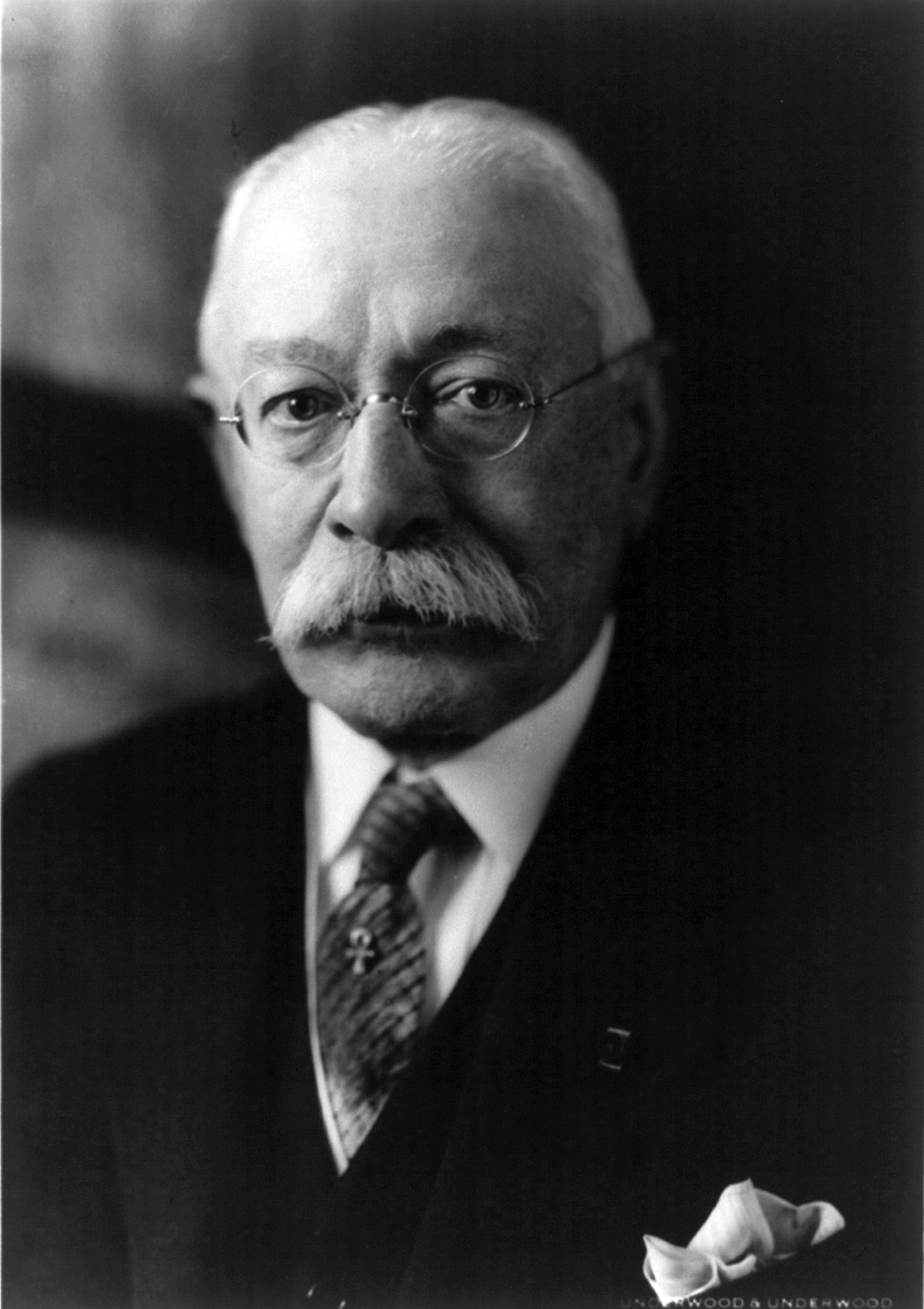
George Woodward Wickersham.

During his early days in politics, Lowenthal served as advisor to several United States senators. In 1929, he served as pro bono secretary on U.S. President Herbert Hoover's National Commission on Law Observance and Enforcement (later called the Wickersham Commission) to investigate gang-related crimes and Prohibition enforcement through July 1930, when he resigned. He assisted Ferdinand Pecora with Senate committee hearings investigating the causes of the Wall Street Crash of 1929. The hearings launched a major reform of the American financial system. Around 1930, "another job that I was given in connection with the charge that in the Government that men were taking positions in the Government who had private investments," connected (unclearly recounted later by Lowenthal) to his Harvard Law School friend, U.S. Solicitor General Charles Hughes, Jr. (1929–1930), son of 11th Chief Justice Charles Evans Hughes, Sr. In 1933–1934, he consulted for the U.S. Senate Banking and Currency Committee. "I can't remember that I had worked for any congressional committee before that, but this I would not want to affirm categorically."

==== Railroad reorganization ====
In 1933, Lowenthal began advocating railroad reform by republishing his original Harvard Law Review argument The Railroad Reorganization Act in book form along with a second book, The Investor Pays (1933) (Felix Frankfurter attributed much of the work on The Investor Pays to Benjamin V. Cohen.) Abuses he cited included: control of receivership and of reorganization by owners prior to acknowledgement of insolvency, inadequate administration of properties prior to reorganization, inadequate regulatory supervision, and conflicts of interest. While making the rounds "as agents of the President" with Tommy Corcoran (one of Felix Frankfurter's "Happy Hotdogs"), Lowenthal told any and all that nothing would happen "without the help of railway labor." On July 5, 1935 Federal Coordinator Joseph Bartlett Eastman wrote to Senator Wheeler (committee chair), with Lowenthal as committee counsel, to recommend 18 railroads (including Van Sweringen Lines, Pennsylvania Railroad, Wabash Railway, and Delaware & Hudson Company) plus financiers (J.P. Morgan & Company, and Kuhn, Loeb & Company) for investigation, as reported in the New York Times and Railway Age. Only in December 1936 did Lowenthal manage to obtain enough subpoenaed documentation to begin actual investigation, according to Railway Age. By 1939, the Senate had introduced a "Lowenthal Bi|ll" to create a special "Railroad Reorganization Court" for bankrupt railroads and downsizing of capitalization and reduction of fixed charges. In April 1939, ICC commissioner Walter M. W. Splawn and committee counsel Lowenthal testified. Lowenthal explained changes in the new Reorganization Act of 1939 (passed and signed into law on April 3, 1939). Its special court would make for "sounder reorganizations" thanks to judges trained in railroads.

==== Truman ====
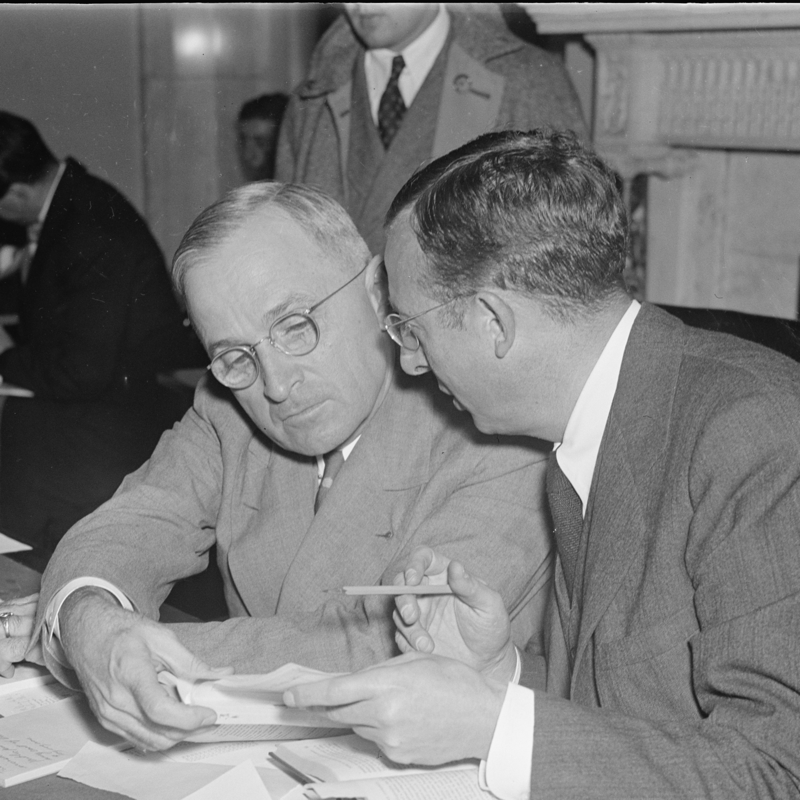
Counsel and chief investigator Max Lowenthal huddles with U.S. Senator and acting chairman Harry S. Truman on the Senate Committee investigating railroad financing, as it resumed its open hearings today, when Senator Truman was presiding for Senator Burton K. Wheeler.

In 1935, Lowenthal met Harry S. Truman, after Truman joined a subcommittee of the U.S. Senate Interstate Commerce Committee, investigating railroads and holding companies, which resulted in U.S. Senate Resolution 71 on February 4, 1935. Senator Robert F. Wagner had to withdraw from the subcommittee, and Senator Burton K. Wheeler filled his place with Truman. Senators on that subcommittee included: Wheeler (chair), Truman, Alben Barkley, Victor Donahey, Wallace White, and Henrik Shipstead. Heading the legal counselors for that subcommittee was Telford Taylor, assisted by Lowenthal and Sidney J. Kaplan, who later headed the Claims Division in the Solicitor General's office of the U.S. Department of Justice during World War II, George Rosier, Lucien Hilmer, and John Davis. According to close Truman's Appointments Secretary Matthew J. Connelly, "Lowenthal served as counsel for Senator Truman during the hearings on the setting up of the Civil Aeronautics Board." According to daughter Margaret Truman, Truman relied on Lowenthal to keep up pressure on the Missouri Pacific Railroad and Alleghany Corporation over the "Alleghany-Missouri Pacific matter."

Lowenthal later recollected, "Until we went into World War II, I may have been doing some work for the Interstate Commerce Committee. I was for a number of years, in that category which was referred to as dollar-a-year men, but, when we went into the war, I had a talk with Senator Wheeler and suggested that probably I ought to be available on some wartime work, and Chairman Wheeler thought that was right." Thus, Lowenthal did not serve with Truman on the so-called "Truman Committee" (1941-1944) (formally, the Senate Special Committee to Investigate the National Defense Program, 1941-1948, from 1948 the Permanent Subcommittee on Investigations or "PSI," and current the "United States Senate Homeland Security Permanent Subcommittee on Investigations"). "I attended one or two hearings out of interest, but I was completing work for the Interstate Commerce Committee at that time and then I was involved in some work in the war effort which was pretty absorbing -- it was day and night work," he later recalled.

From 1944 to 1946, Lowenthal left official government service. In 1944, Lowenthal attended the 1944 Democratic National Convention in Chicago. In 1944, Truman wrote to his daughter that Lowenthal, William M. Boyle, and Leslie Biffle "were on my trail... Yes, they are plotting against your dad" along with many others "trying to make him VP against his will." Truman told Lowenthal that FDR had included him on his shortlist of candidates for vice president. Lowenthal went with Truman to meet with Philip Murray, head of the Congress of Industrial Organizations (CIO) union federation, for support. "I think that someone in his organization had been urging another name on Phil Murray, but I believe in time he swung behind Mr. Truman."

In Fall 1946, Lowenthal had lunch with Bob Patterson, newly promoted from Assistant Secretary of War to Secretary of War, whom he had known "for many years": Patterson told Lowenthal he was sending him to Berlin for a "war job, or a wartime-produced task... I think that was the last official position I held in government." The job was restitution of property stolen by Nazis. Lowenthal spent six weeks in Germany to collect evidence so he could draw up a report, reporting to the U.S. High Commissioner of Germany, General Lucius D. Clay.

Upon his return to the States, Lowenthal "had a good deal of work" on Nazi-related cases of "heirless" property. In that period, the U.S. Attorney General (Tom C. Clark at that time) made recommendations that included "relaxing the universal ban on wire tapping"–at which time, Lowenthal "noticed that that was in the list."

In 1948, Truman felt (according to Lowenthal in 1967) that the Mundt-Nixon Bill that year was "to punish sedition."

=== FBI and HUAC investigations ===
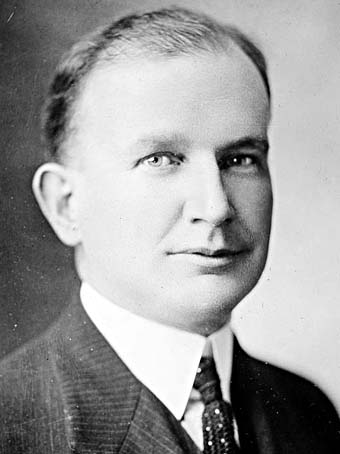
Former U.S. Senator Burton K. Wheeler served as Lowenthal's counsel before HUAC in 1950

During 1947-1948, the FBI investigated Lowenthal. They used wiretaps, as evidenced in later-FOIA-ed FBI files. FBI files on Lowenthal also include draft versions of his 1948 book on the FBI.

In 1950, Lowenthal published a book critical of the Federal Bureau of Investigation (see Works, below), which led to him being called before the House Un-American Activities Committee, where he denied he had "aided and abetted" Communist in government service . The book and negative press helped end a 38-year career in public service.

On August 28, 1950, Lee Pressman testified that he had not recommended Lowenthal for a job at the War Production Board.

On September 1, 1950, Charles Kramer refused to answer questions as to whether he was acquainted with Lowenthal.

That same day, U.S. Representative George A. Dondero called Lowenthal a "menace to the best interests of America." Dondero said that his government career was "replete with incidents where he aided and abetted Communists" starting in 1917.

On September 15, 1950, Lowenthal appeared before the House Un-American Activities Committee AKA "HUAC" (two of whose members were Mundt and Nixon–of the Mundt-Nixon Bill). Already in August 1950, HUAC had re-subpoenaed four witness who had been part of Whittaker Chambers's Ware Group: Lee Pressman, Nathan Witt, Charles Kramer and John Abt. The committee had asked both Pressman and Kramer whether they knew Lowenthal; both confirmed. Lowenthal brought former U.S. Senator Burton K. Wheeler as counsel. After reviewing his curriculum vitae, the committee tried to link him with known or alleged Communist Party members and organizations, some of which he confirmed, others not, all without admitting any wrongdoing. Names mentioned included: Alger Hiss, Donald Hiss, David Wahl, Bartley Crum, Martin Popper, Allan Rosenberg, Lee Pressman, the Russian-American Industrial Corporation, the Twentieth Century Fund, and the International Juridical Association.

On November 19, 1950, the government published Lowenthal's closed-session testimony from September 15, 1950. During testimony, Lowenthal had denied aiding or abetting Communists in government service. Specifically, he denied any involvement in the employment or sponsoring of George Shaw Wheeler, a former US government employee who had defected to Czechoslovakia in 1947 and publicly requested political asylum there in 1950. He noted that Wheeler had been transferred to his division on the Board of Economic Warfare from the War Production Board "toward the end of my service with the board" He also said that Wheeler had not worked with him in Germany." He also claimed to have advised Lee Pressman in 1944 against naming Henry A. Wallace as Democratic candidate for vice president.

On November 27, 1950, Senator Bourke B. Hickenlooper noted, "In the Washington Post of November 26, 1950, there are published two reviews of a recent book entitled The Federal Bureau of Investigation, by Max Lowenthal, New Deal mystery man of Washington." The first ("A Lawyer's Indictment in Mood of Prosecutor") was by Rev. Edmund A. Walsh S.J., of Georgetown University, which Hickenlooper read into the record. The second by Joseph L. Rauh Jr., a former civil servant, whom Hickenlooper denounced for criticizing the FBI, for chairing the National Committee for Democratic Action, and for affiliations with Alger Hiss, Donald Hiss, Felix Frankfurter, William Remington, and James L. Fly of Americans for Democratic Action. Hickenlooper stated "I have the greatest admiration and respect for the integrity of the director, Mr. J. Edgar Hoover, and his staff personnel" at the FBI.

=== Unofficial policy group member ===
During the 1950s, Lowenthal supervised "an operation... conducted... to prepare answers to the charges that Senator McCarthy was making." This followed McCarthy's claim that he possessed "a list" of Communists within the State Department. Lowenthal was later unable to recall clearly the names of anyone who helped him: Truman Library oral historian Jerry N. Hess suggested that they might have included Herbert N. Maletz, Lowell Mellett, and Franklin N. Parks. The White House was supportive: when Lowenthal came to Washington to work, sometimes he would be provided office space there.

In May 1951, White House Appointments Secretary Matthew J. Connelly asked Lowenthal to help General Harry H. Vaughan in "setting up testimony", after Vaughan admitted repeated episodes of trading access to the White House for expensive gifts. Later, he also helped Connelly himself (who was convicted of bribery charges in 1956). (When asked whether Lowenthal served on that counter-McCarthy committee, Connelly, however, said, "Not that I recall. He had nothing to do with the White House.")

In mid-summer 1951, Truman wrote Lowenthal to thank him for a letter and respond regarding Senator Joseph McCarthy's speech of Jun 14, 1951, attacking George Marshall. They discussed the need for the U.S. government to support international security. "I certainly did appreciate your good letter," Truman ended.

In 1952, when Truman announced he would not seek re-election, Vice President Alben Barkley could not secure the presidential nomination from the Democratic Party due to a lack of endorsement from labor leaders. Connelly later recalled:

Hess: Do you recall the difficulty that Mr. Barkley had at the 1952 convention with the labor delegates?
Connelly: I remember it very well because I had Max Lowenthal–I believe you know Max Lowenthal–I had him out there and Max was very close to the labor boys. I had a room at the Mayflower Hotel with two TV sets watching the convention, and I used to get calls from Max, from Chicago, and the day Barkley arrived–unfortunately he had very bad eyes–and he walked through the lobby of the hotel and he didn't recognize the labor boys who were there. So they thought they were snubbed. So I then got Les Biffle on the phone and Les had always been very close to Barkley and he was out there at the convention, as a matter of fact, he was sergeant at arms of the convention, and I told Les what happened. So then they made a strategic mistake, because labor leaders are all prima donnas, and I suggested to Les that Barkley set up a meeting with these fellows and talk to them individually. So instead of that they set up a breakfast the next morning and invited all the labor leaders. Well, they are very jealous of each other. So, all that achieved was one more snubbing for the prima donnas, so they sat on their hands as far as Barkley was concerned.

Lowenthal introduced Truman to U.S. Supreme Justice Louis Brandeis.

In 1953, Lowenthal was "member" of the Truman Administration, according to the papers of American evangelist Billy James Hargis (who also lists him among "Alleged Reds" 1950–1954).

Lowenthal's best known accomplishment occurred during his term as the chief adviser on Palestine to Clark Clifford, an advisor to President Truman, from 1947-1952. President Truman credited Lowenthal as being the primary force behind the United States recognition of Israel. On the other hand, Matthew J. Connelly pointed to David Niles, an associate of Harry Hopkins from the WPA, as "very effective in the problems we had in connection with the recognition of Israel" because of his contacts in the Jewish community: "David Dubinsky, Abraham Feinberg. You name any leader in the Jewish faction, and he had intimate contacts with him." Connelly denoted Lowenthal as one of contacts–"oh, very much so, very much so." When Niles died in 1951, Connelly chose Feinberg to succeed him in that liaison role.) Historian Michael J. Cohen argues that Clark Clifford relied on Lowenthal for advice on Israel, and Lowenthal in turn on Benjamin V. Cohen.

In the late 1950s, Norman Thomas criticized Bertrand Russell for citing Lowenthal and Cedric Belfrage as authorities on wrongdoings by the FBI. Russell responded in "The State of Civil Liberties" in The New Leader, published on February 18, 1957. Russell retorted, "You seem to imply that criticisms of the FBI can be ignored if they come from Communists or Fellow-travellers. In particular, you point out that Mr. Lowenthal had a grievance against the FBI. It is, however, an almost invariable fact that protests against injustice originate with those who suffer from them." Russell recommended that Thomas go buy and read Lowenthal's book.

As late as 1967, Lowenthal denied ever even discussing Israel with President Truman and claimed to have only heard of the partition of Palestine through a secondhand source in the White House.

== Personal life and death ==
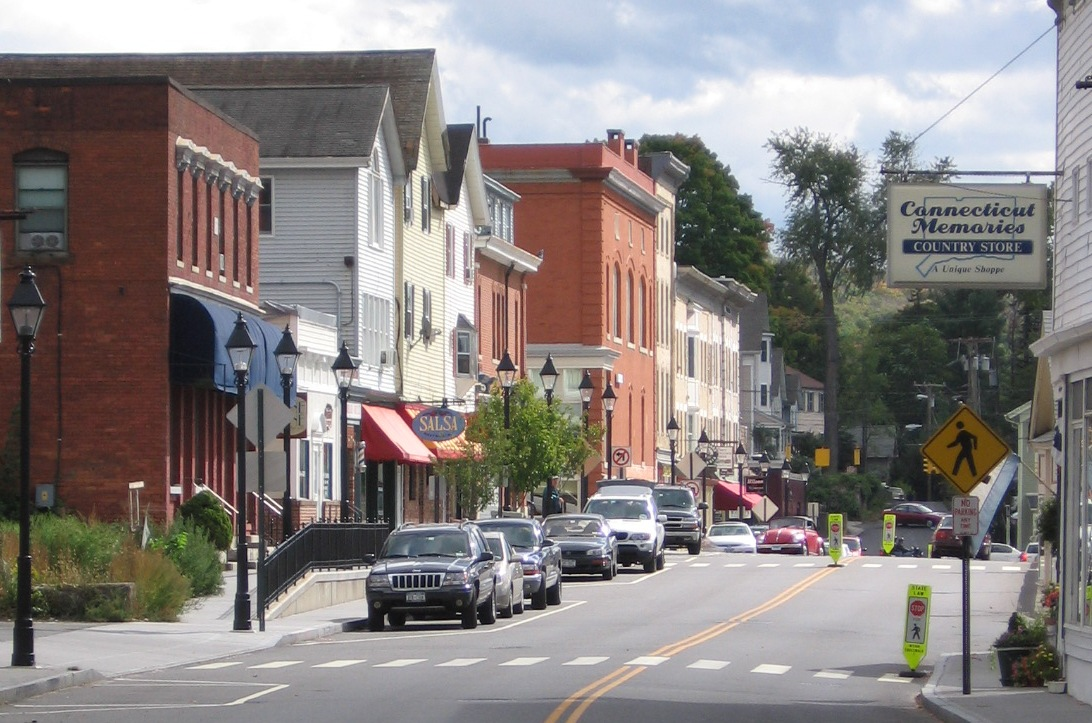
New Milford (2007), where Lowenthal maintained a home for many years

Lowenthal was married to Eleanor Mack, niece of Judge Julian Mack. They had three children: David (1923–2018), John (1925–2003) and Elizabeth (Betty) (1927–2022).

On September 15, 1950, Lowenthal told HUAC that he kept homes at 467 West Central Park in Manhattan and in New Milford, Connecticut. During World War II, he resided at 1 West Irving Street, Chevy Chase, Maryland.

Regarding Truman overall, late in life Lowenthal told Truman Library oral historian Jerry N. Hess:

I was deeply sold on Mr. Truman's usefulness to America. I haven't been a hero worshipper but I have had deep affection for some men in public affairs whom I got to know, and that was certainly true in the case of Mr. Truman.

During the same interview, however, Lowenthal remembered only one Truman staff member by name (Victor Messall).

Regarding Truman's views on red scares in the United States, Lowenthal commented:

When he came back from service in the Army in the First World War, he was disgusted with the hysteria that prevailed in some quarters in 1919 and 1920, and I think he never forgot that -- that disgust that he had acquired. You may remember -- I don't mean to say that Mr. Truman mentioned this specifically -- there was a magazine published by a man named Guy Empey.... A good many people were greatly excited and there was a good deal of "treat them rough stuff" during World War I and for a year or two or three afterward. I think that burned into Mr. Truman, who had been engaged in active fighting in France during the war, that such things should go on... You know, there was during World War I bitterness against the Socialists and against the IWW, not against, to any extent, the Bolsheviks; that came later. You read about that period. They threw Victor Berger, the Socialist, out of the Congress. Mr. Truman was disgusted with such excitement, and I think that may have been part of his make-up from childhood onward, but I'm only guessing.

He died age 83 on May 18, 1971, at home (444 Central Park West) of heart ailment.

Lowenthal was a trustee of the Twentieth Century Fund from 1924 to 1933.

== Recollections about him ==
Recollections of Lowenthal from Truman Library oral histories are mixed.

Some are favorable:

- "Disciple of Louis Brandeis": Margaret Truman
- "A famous investigator" in 1935: Roswell L. Gilpatric, Deputy Secretary of Defense (1961–64)

Others are less favorable:

- "(Truman said)... I have two Jewish assistants on my staff, Dave Niles and Max Lowenthal. Whenever I try to talk to them about Palestine they soon burst into tears because they are so emotionally involved in the subject.": Oscar R. Ewing, organizer and member of unofficial political policy group during Truman administration (1947–52)
- " I know they thought he was a Communist. And I never could figure that out. They came around to me about it. Max was a far-out liberal. He was a very good investigator on the railroads.": Raymond P. Brandt, St. Louis Post-Dispatch Washington Bureau Chief (1934–1961)

Stephen J. Spingarn, Federal Trade Commission Commissioner (1950–1953), recalled,

Max Lowenthal was a good friend of the President's from the days in the '30s... They became friends at that time, and he had total access to the White House. During the McCarthy period he was there all the time, almost daily; he used to hang out in Matt Connelly's rear office. I had had an encounter early in my White House career with Max Lowenthal. Clark Clifford told me that Max was worried about an Internal Security bill (of 1950).

However, Spingarn also suspected that Lowenthal (and Connelly) "stuck the knife in me." Phileo Nash told Spingarn it was Connelly, influenced by Lowenthal:

I mentioned that Max Lowenthal had once told Niles, and possibly others that I was a Fascist, that was in 1949, because I told Lowenthal I favored wiretapping under proper controls... Nash said it was quite possible that Max Lowenthal was very vindictive, and he mentioned that Max Lowenthal is currently spending much time in Matt's office with L's son.

Spingarn further recalled:

There was an operation run, more or less, under the supervision of Max Lowenthal in the basement of the White House which was to prepare answers to the charges that McCarthy was hurling so freely during all that period and get them ready in a hurry, not wait until the lie had gone around the world before the truth has gotten its pants on. I remember Herb Maletz–good man–worked in that thing and one or two others whose names I can't remember at the moment. Max Lowenthal was very much involved in that, and in his book The Truman Presidency, Cabell Phillips has me teamed up with Max Lowenthal in running that operation, which is not correct. I did an awful lot of work on the McCarthy stuff, but I did it in terms of trying to devise some machinery, or system, or operation.

After the FBI book came out, Westbrook Pegler, a right‐wing columnist, called Lowenthal "the mysterious New York lawyer, who now appears to have picked Harry Truman for President."

In the early 1930s, claimed Whittaker Chambers in his 1952 memoir Witness, Lowenthal (Max "Loewenthal" in Witness) was a member of the International Juridical Association (IJA), along with Carol Weiss King, Abraham Isserman, and Lee Pressman. In the inaugural issue of the Monthly Bulletin of the International Juridical Association (May 1932), "Max Lowenthal, member of the New York bar" appears in an article called "Protest Meeting." During his 1950 HUAC testimony, Lowenthal admitted that he had helped organize the "National Lawyers Guild" in the 1930s. He was also a member of the American Bar Association and the New York Bar Association.

Lowenthal's correspondents included fellow Minnesotan George B. Leonard.

== Works ==
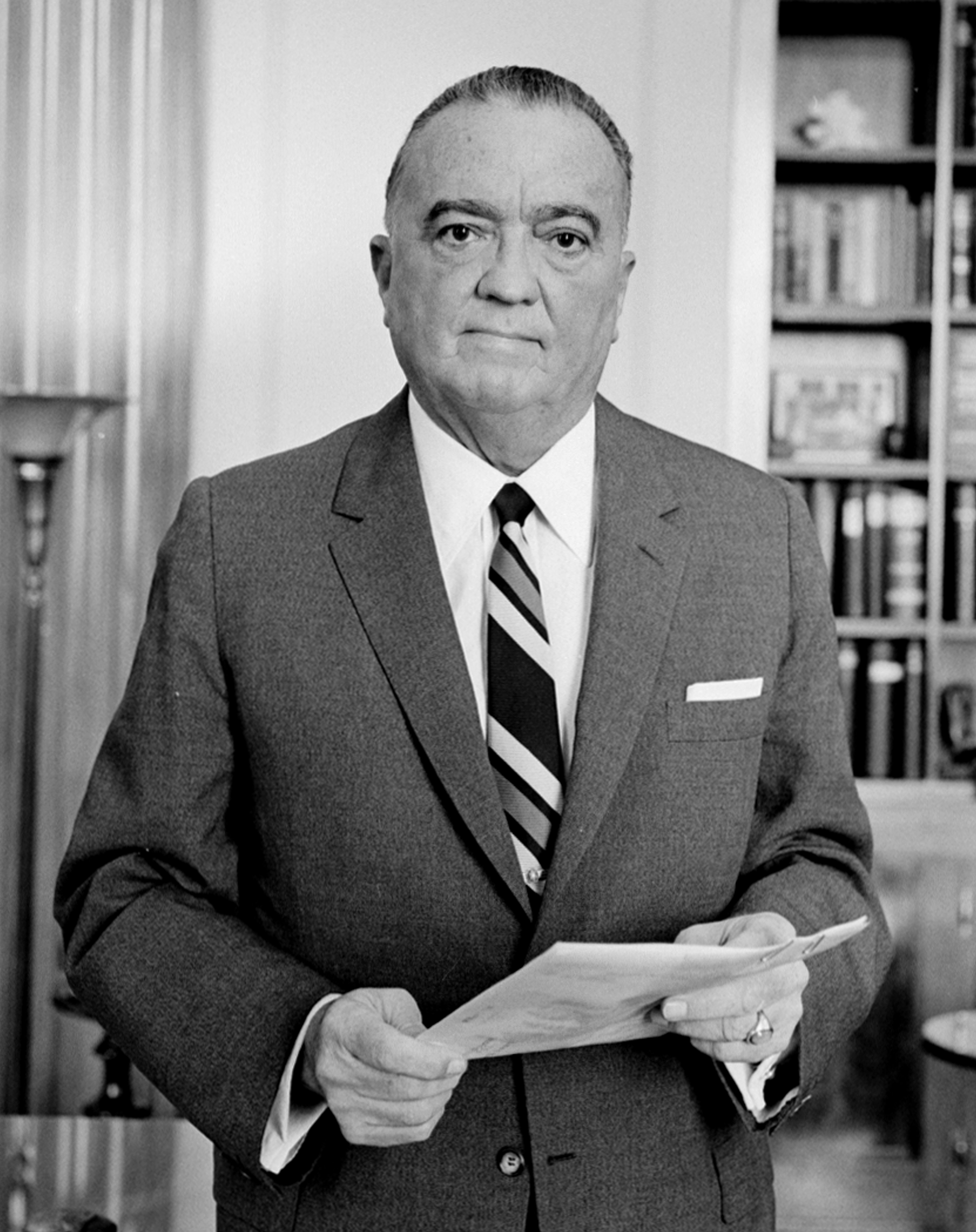
J. Edgar Hoover, FBI director (1924–1972)

In 1950 he wrote a book about the FBI, in which he dealt with issues he felt were still unresolved "although they were brought to light and discussed by statesmen in 1908 and 1909 when the police force now known as the FBI was created." The New York Times announced the book a day in advance of its publication on November 21, 1947, with a subtitle that read "Lawyer Says Hoover Policies Set Up Secret Police." In New York Times Sunday Book Review, Cabell Phillips said the book showed "immense research and careful documentation" and "almost for the first time... it pulled aside the self‐righteous cloak in which the FBI has wrapped itself." Writing for the University of Chicago Law Review in 1952, however, T. Henry Walnut (member of the Pennsylvania Bar) noted "From Mr. Lowenthal's review of the FBI's political activities they would appear negligible between the years 1924 and 1946, when the Bureau picked up the trail of the Communist. This period, however, was not a political vacuum. It was filled with differences as bitter as any the country has ever known... If Mr. Lowenthal is still looking for evidence as to what can be done through the FBI, under its present centralized direction from Washington, to oppress dissenting individuals and groups, it would be well for him to study the period from December 8, 1941 to the end of 1945. George M. Elsey, Administrative Assistant to the President (1949–1951) felt that "Lowenthal had a passionate dislike of the FBI and J. Edgar Hoover in particular." Asked to read galley proofs for his book on the FBI, he later commented, "The book was so unfair, so grossly biased, so sloppily done in every respect that it couldn't possibly influence anybody about the FBI. Any serious reader would just lay the thing aside in disgust... The President was just tolerant, shrugged his shoulder, tended to laugh it off and say, 'Oh, Max is that way'."

Books:

- The Investor Pays (1933) (1936)
- The Railroad Reorganization Act (1933)
- Uncredited speeches for Harry S. Truman
- The Federal Bureau of Investigation (1950) (1971)
- Police methods in crime detection and counter-espionage (1951) (paper)

== See also ==
- Felix Frankfurter
- Julian W. Mack
- Carol Weiss King
- Benjamin V. Cohen
- Sidney Hillman
- Harry S. Truman
- Oscar R. Ewing
- Robert Szold
- John Lowenthal
- David Lowenthal

== External sources ==
- "Max Lowenthal papers, 1910-1971". University of Minnesota.
- "Max Lowenthal. Papers, 1929-1931". Harvard Law School Library. February 2006.
- "Collection of Max Lowenthal (1945–1947)". EHRI Consortium. 4 April 2013.
- Truman Library - Max Lowenthal Papers
- Michael J. Cohen, Truman and Israel, (Berkeley, CA: University of California Press, 1990.)
- Ronald Radosh and Allis Radosh, A Safe Haven: Harry S. Truman and the Founding of Israel (HarperCollins, 2009)
- Library of Congress: Donald S Dawson papers, 1944-1993
- Library of Congress: Felix Frankfurter papers, 1846–1966
- Library of Congress: Photo of Truman and Lowenthal (October 20, 1937)
- Yad Vashem: Max Lowenthal Collection
- EHRI Collection of Max Lowenthal
- Duke University - Max Lowenthal box
