= Betty Levin =

American writer (1927–2022)

- Betty Levin, from a 2003 publication, photographed by Jill Paton Walsh
- Born: Elizabeth Lowenthal; September 10, 1927; New York City
- Died: July 4, 2022 (aged 94); Lincoln, Massachusetts
- Occupations: College professor, writer
- Father: Max Lowenthal
- Relatives: David Lowenthal (brother), John Lowenthal (brother), Julian Mack (great-uncle)

Elizabeth "Betty" Lowenthal Levin (September 10, 1927 – July 4, 2022) was an American college professor and a writer who specialized in fiction for young readers. She was co-founder of the Simmons College Center for the Study of Children's Literature, and of Children's Literature New England. She was also a sheep farmer, and bred border collies.

== Early life and education ==
Betty Lowenthal was born in New York City, the daughter of Max Lowenthal and Eleanor Mack Lowenthal. Her father was an attorney; her mother was a music educator who worked on refugee resettlement during and after World War II. Her older brothers were attorney John Lowenthal and historian and geographer David Lowenthal. Their great-uncle was judge Julian Mack.

Lowenthal attended the National Cathedral School and graduated from Horace Mann Lincoln School in 1945. She earned a bachelor's degree from the University of Rochester in 1949, and a master's degree from Harvard Graduate School of Education in 1951.

== Career ==
Levin was a member of the faculty at Simmons College, and co-founded the Center for the Study of Children's Literature there. She also helped to found Children's Literature New England, a non-profit organization. Levin ran a sheep farm in Lincoln, Massachusetts, and was a founding member of the New England Border Collie Association. She was an active member of the Society of Children's Book Writers and Illustrators.

== Publications ==
=== Books by Levin ===
Levin began writing children's books after a creative writing fellowship at the Bunting Institute of Radcliffe College from 1968 to 1970. She published more than two dozen books for children, often set in New England, and sometimes with time-travel themes. She received the Hope Sweetser Dean Award in 2001, and the Judy Lopez Memorial Children's Book Award in 1989. She said, "Literature can only continue to grow from the roots of our collective experience if children understand that they are born creative and that all humans are myth users and storytellers." "Levin combines several genres popular with the middle school reader," noted a Chicago Tribune reviewer in 1997, "and the mixture will draw in even a reluctant reader."

- The Zoo Conspiracy (1973)
- The Sword of Culann (1973)
- A Griffon's Nest (1975)
- The Forespoken (1976)
- Landfall (1979)
- Beast on the Brink (1980)
- The Keeping-Room (1981)
- A Binding Spell (1984)
- Put on my Crown (1985)
- The Ice Bear (1986)
- The Trouble with Gramary (1988)
- Brother Moose (1990)
- Mercy's Mill (1992)
- Away to Me, Moss (1994)
- Starshine and Sunglow (1994)
- Fire in the Wind (1995)
- Island Bound (1997)
- Look Back, Moss (1998)
- The Banished (1999)
- Creature Crossing (1999)
- Shadow Catcher (2000)
- That'll Do, Moss (2002)
- Shoddy Cove (2003)
- Thorn (2005)
- The Unmaking of Duncan Veerick (2007)
- The Forbidden Land (2010)
- Gift Horse (2010)
- A Realm of Their Own

=== Academic publication by Levin ===
- "Peppers' Progress: One Hundred Years of the Five Little Peppers" (The Horn Book Magazine, 1981)

== Personal life ==
Betty Lowenthal married lawyer and publisher Alvin Leon Levin (1924–1987, who was not the author Alvin Levin) in 1947, while they were both students at the University of Rochester. They had three daughters. She and her husband both survived polio in the 1950s; he used a wheelchair afterward. Her husband died in 1987, and one of her daughters died in 2016. She died in July 2022, at the age of 94, in Lincoln, Massachusetts.
