= John Lowenthal =

American lawyer (1925–2003)

- Born: May 14, 1925; New York City
- Died: September 9, 2003 (aged 78); London
- Occupation: Academic
- Known for: Lifelong defense of Alger Hiss
- Parent(s): Max Lowenthal, Eleanor Mack (niece of Julian Mack)

Academic background
- Education: Columbia University
- Alma mater: Columbia Law School

Academic work
- Discipline: Law

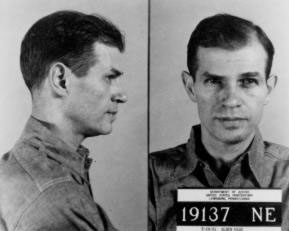
Lowenthal helped defend Alger Hiss (here at Lewisburg Federal Penitentiary, courtesy of the Federal Bureau of Prisons)

John Lowenthal (1925–2003) was a 20th-century American lawyer, civil servant, law professor, and documentary filmmaker, who defended the name and reputation of family friend Alger Hiss almost all his life.

== Background ==
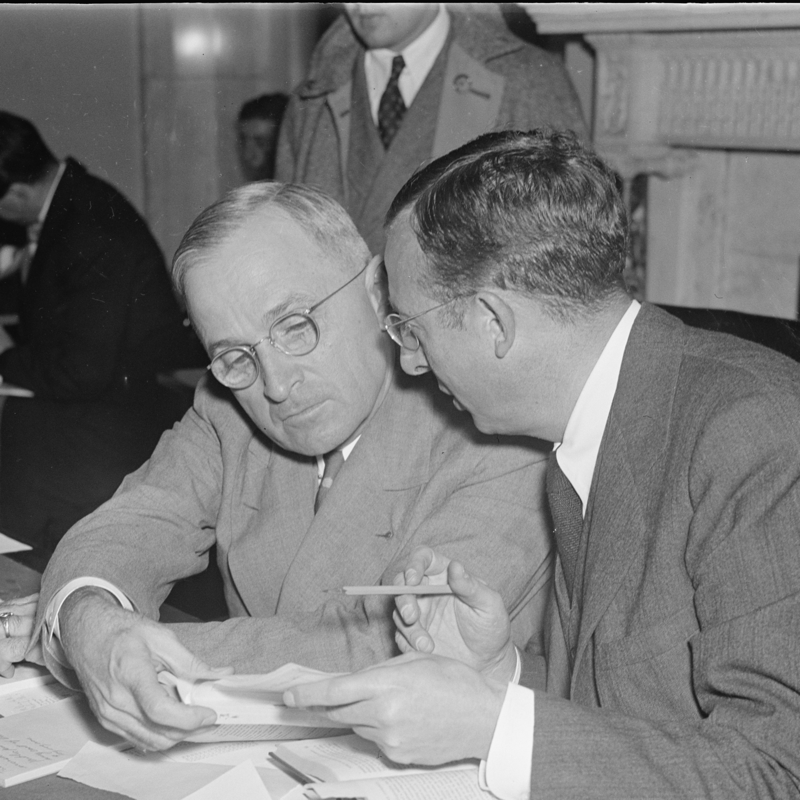
Father Max Lowenthal counsels Senator Harry S. Truman (October 20, 1937)

John Lowenthal was born on May 14, 1925, in New York City. His father was Max Lowenthal and mother Eleanor Mack, niece of Judge Julian Mack (for whom his father had clerked). He had two siblings David Lowenthal and Elizabeth (Betty) Lowenthal Levin.

Lowenthal studied at Columbia College and Columbia Law School, where he obtained his law degree in 1950.

== Career ==
=== Government service ===
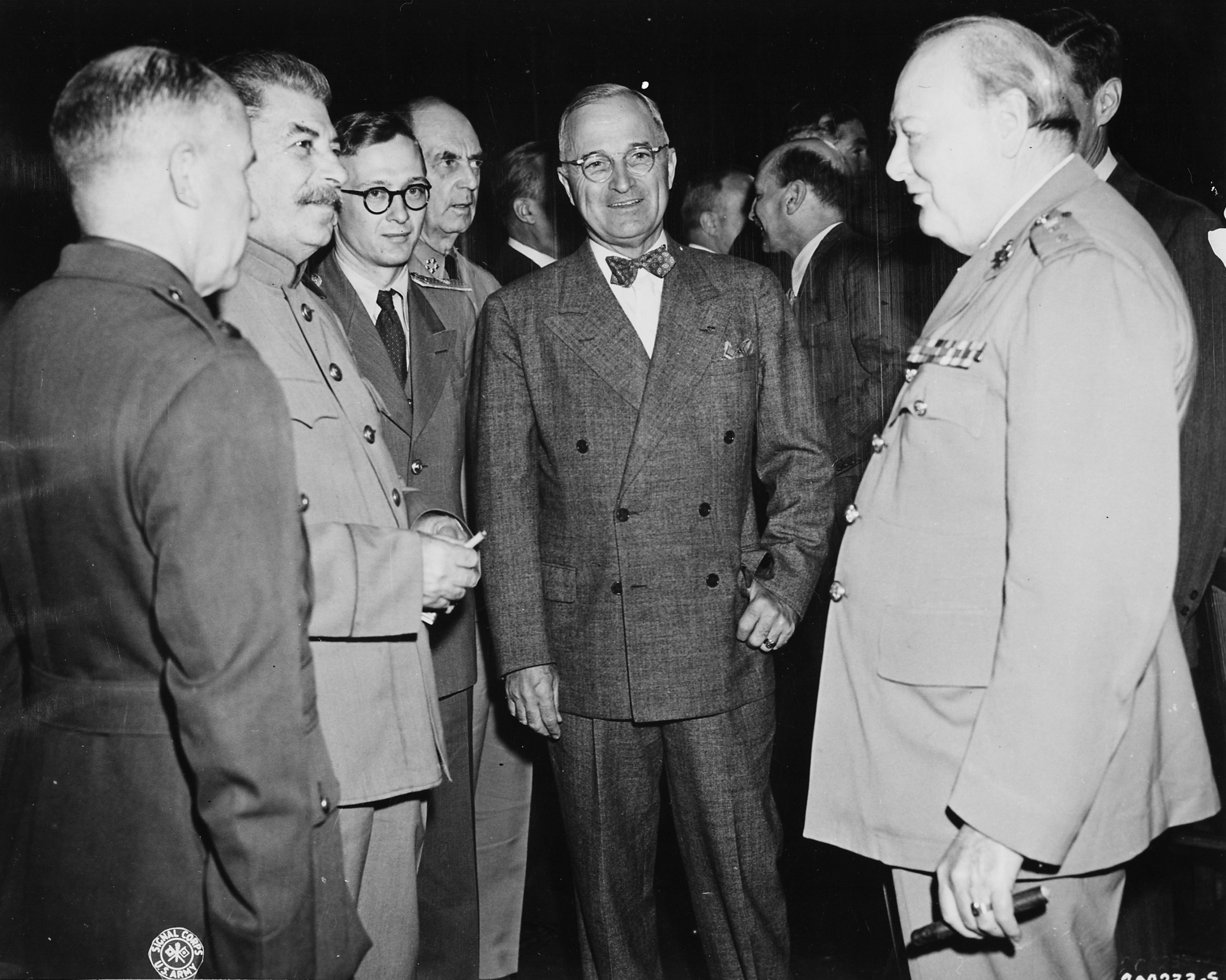
Harry S. Truman, for whom Lowenthal worked briefly, with Joseph Stalin and Winston Churchill at Potsdam (July 1945)

In the 1940s, Lowenthal served in the U.S. Navy.

In the late 1940s (overlapping with the Hiss Case), during the Truman administration, he worked in the White House, where his father also worked (unofficially–"in the basement"), according to White House staff Stephen J. Spingarn.

=== Academia ===
By 1978, Lowenthal had become a professor of law at Rutgers University.

Later, he taught at the New School for Social Research and CUNY School of Law at Queens College, City University of New York.

== Hiss Case ==
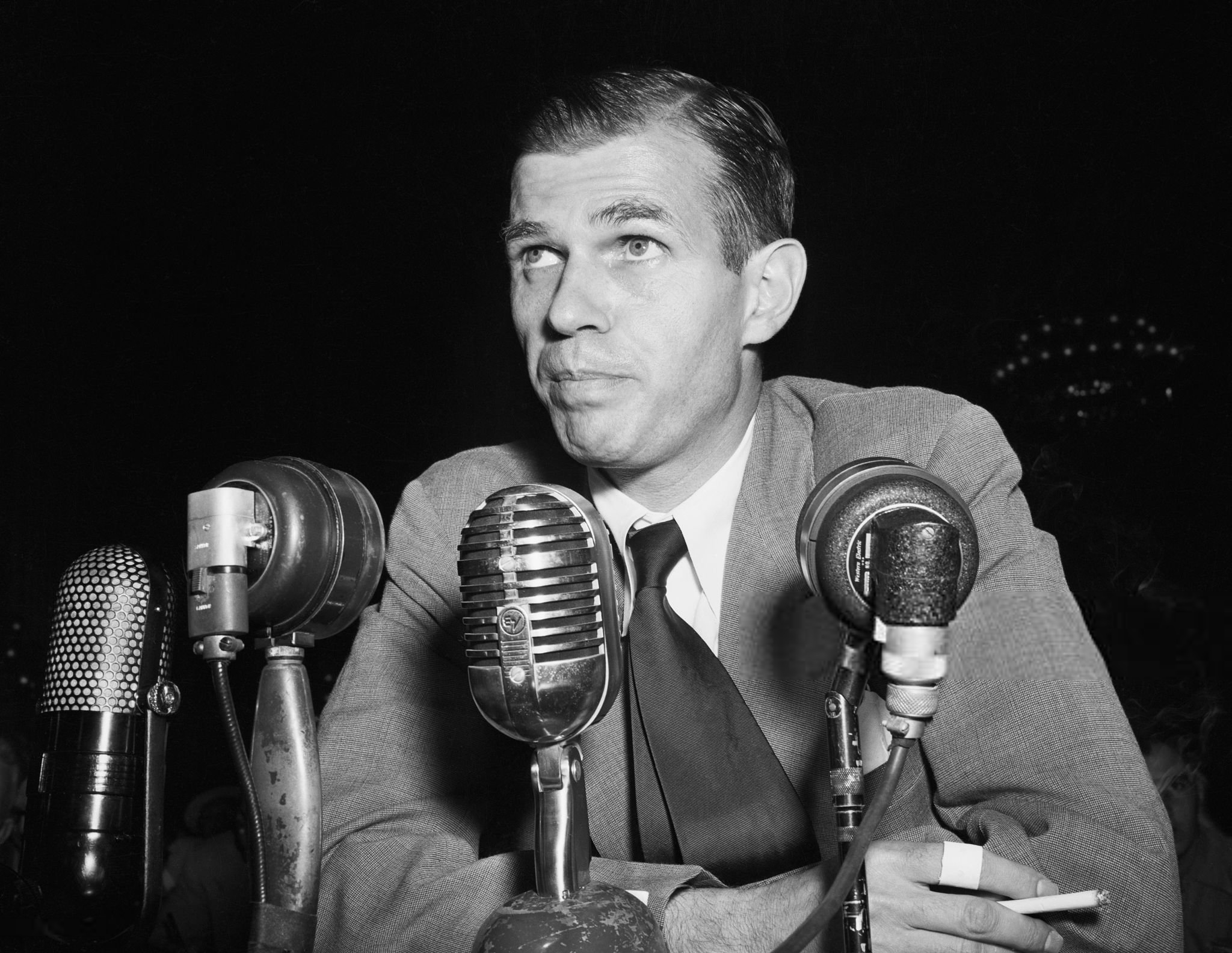
Alger Hiss (1948), lifelong friend of the Lowenthals

In 1949, Lowenthal volunteered to the defense during Alger Hiss's two perjury trials.

In the 1970s, after the release of suppressed FBI documents about the case, Lowenthal, by then a Rutgers University law professor, published an analysis of what this new evidence revealed.

=== Documentary ===
In 1978 while on sabbatical, Lowenthal made a documentary film called The Trials of Alger Hiss.

=== Volkogonov ===
In August 1991, after the dissolution of the Soviet Union, Lowenthal asked General Dmitry Antonovich Volkogonov, who had become President Yeltsin's military advisor and the overseer of all the Soviet intelligence archives, to request the release of any Soviet files on the Hiss case. Both former President Nixon and the director of his presidential library, John H. Taylor, wrote similar letters, though their full contents are not yet publicly available. Russian archivists responded by reviewing their files, and in late 1992 reported back that they had found no evidence Hiss ever engaged in espionage for the Soviet Union nor that he was a member of the Communist Party. However, Volkogonov subsequently stated he spent only two days on the search and had mainly relied on the word of KGB archivists. "What I saw gave me no basis to claim a full clarification", he said. Referring to Hiss's lawyer, he added, "John Lowenthal pushed me to say things of which I was not fully convinced." General-Lieutenant Vitaly Pavlov, who ran Soviet intelligence work in North America in the late 1930s and early 1940s for the NKVD said that Hiss never worked for the USSR as one of his agents. In 2003, retired Russian intelligence official General Julius Kobyakov disclosed that it was he who had actually searched the files for Volkogonov. Kobyakov stated that Hiss did not have a relationship with SVR predecessor organizations, although Hiss was accused of being with the GRU, a military intelligence organization separate from SVR predecessors. In 2007, Svetlana Chervonnaya, a Russian researcher who had been studying Soviet archives since the early 1990s, argued that based on documents she reviewed, Hiss was not implicated in spying. In May 2009, at a conference hosted by the Wilson Center, Mark Kramer, director of Cold War Studies at Harvard University at the John F. Kennedy School of Government, stated that he did not "trust a word [Kobyakov] says." At the same conference, historian Ronald Radosh reported that while researching the papers of Marshal Voroshilov in Moscow, he and Mary Habeck had encountered two GRU (Soviet military intelligence) files referring to Alger Hiss as "our agent".

=== Vassiliev ===
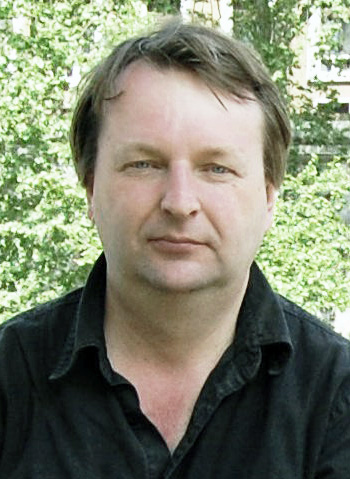
Alexander Vassiliev.

In the Autumn 2000 issue of the journal Intelligence and National Security, Lowenthal published the article "Venona and Alger Hiss," which "claimed not only to show that ALES was not Hiss, but that all the VENONA cables were unreliable." (In 2003, U.S. Air Force historian Eduard Mark published a rebuttal, also in Intelligence and National Security that used VENONA 1822 to trace "ALES" as working for State (1945), with relatives (Donald Hiss, brother) also working in the federal government, had been a GRU agent since the mid-1930s (with Whittaker Chambers in the Ware Group, had attended the Yalta Conference, and had returned from travel to the US by 30 March 1945 – all descriptions which fit Alger Hiss. In his 2000 article, Lowenthal had accused Aleksandr Vassiliev, co-author of The Haunted Wood (1999) with Allen Weinstein, of sloppiness. In July 2001, Vassiliev sued Lowenthal indirectly for libel by suing Frank Cass & Co., publisher of Intelligence and National Security, in the High Court of Justice in London. In January 2003, Frank Cass's lawyers offered Alexander Vassiliev to settle the monetary claim for more than 2,000 British pounds and promised not to republish the John Lowenthal article. Vassiliev rejected the offer. In May 2003 Frank Cass proposed to settle the case for 7,500 pounds, but Vassiliev rejected that offer, too. The trial Vassiliev vs Frank Cass started 9 June 2003 and concluded on 13 June 2003, with Judge David Eady presiding. Frank Cass & Co. prevailed on the basis of "fair comment."

=== Hiss Papers ===
By 2003, Lowenthal had helped son Tony Hiss prepare the Alger Hiss Papers before offering them to the Harvard Law School's library.

== Personal and death ==
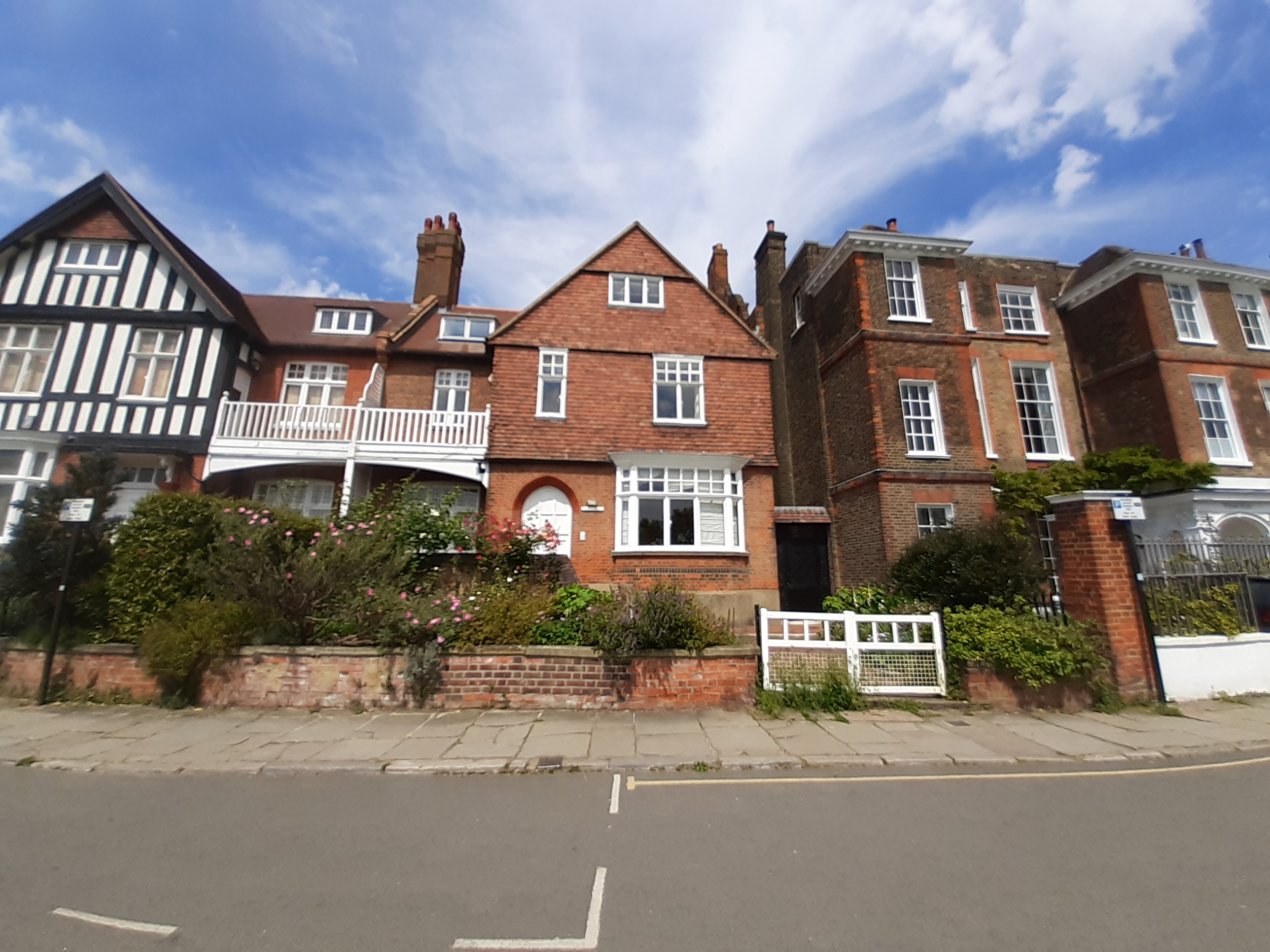
The Tides on Chiswick Mall in 2024.

Lowenthal was a cellist: he made his last appearance in the year of his death at the Salzburg Music Festival.

Lowenthal married Anne Lowenthal of Manhattan and Bridgewater. They had two children: Anne Lowenthal Hermans and James Lowenthal. His later-life partner was Patricia Lousada.

In 1999, he was living at The Tides, Chiswick Mall, London W4.

He died of esophageal cancer age 78 on September 9, 2003, in London.

The Tamiment Library hold his papers, primarily about his documentary.

== Works ==
- The Trials of Alger Hiss (Los Angeles, California: Direct Cinema, Ltd, 1981)
