= National War Labor Board =

National War Labor Board may refer to either of two United States government agencies established to mediate labor disputes in wartime:

- National War Labor Board (1918–1919)
- National War Labor Board (1942–1945)
