= Sidney J. Kaplan =

Nuremberg prosecutor and American attorney (1909–1962)

- Born: February 16, 1909; Minneapolis, Minnesota
- Died: June 19, 1962 (aged 53); Tonka Bay, Minnesota
- Burial place: Fort Snelling National Cemetery
- Education: University of Minnesota (A.B.); Harvard Law School (LL.B.)
- Occupations: Lawyer, Legal Scholar, War Crimes Prosecutor

Sidney Joseph Kaplan (February 16, 1909 – June 19, 1962) was an American attorney best known for his role in the prosecution of war criminals at the Nuremberg Trials.

== Early life and education ==
Kaplan was born in Minneapolis, Minnesota to Max Julius Kaplan, a Jewish immigrant from Viduklė, Lithuania, and his wife Hattie Wolfson Kaplan. He grew up in Near North, Minneapolis, in the neighborhood then known as Homewood. By 1940, the family had moved permanently to their summer home on Lake Minnetonka, one of two matching houses that Max Kaplan and his business partner, Benjamin Weisberg, had built together. Max Kaplan and Weisberg co-founded Fairfax Produce, a company that distributed poultry and eggs from Minnesota farms to markets across the U.S.

Kaplan’s grandfather, Abraham Kaplan, who came to America in 1891, was one of the founders of the Kenesseth Israel Synagogue and served as the first chairman of the Minneapolis Jewish Cemetery Association until his death in 1933. Max Kaplan became chairman of the same organization in 1941.

Kaplan graduated from Minneapolis North High School in 1925 and went on to earn a degree from the University of Minnesota in 1928, where he graduated with an A.B. cum laude, won Phi Beta Kappa honors and was an active member of the Menorah Club, where he debated topics of the day such as the effect of a Jewish state in Palestine on Jews of the diaspora. He then attended Harvard Law School, graduating with an LL.B. magna cum laude in 1931, where he was on the editorial board of the Harvard Law Review. In 1929, Kaplan was one of four Harvard Law students to win the Sears Prize, "awarded annually to students in the School who shall have done the most brilliant work in their class during the year."

With a fellow classmate, George Rosier, he co-authored a thesis titled “Operative Theory in Judicial Interpretations of the Diversity Jurisdiction” under the supervision of Professor Felix Frankfurter, who later served as an Associate Justice of the Supreme Court.

== Legal career ==
Following law school, Kaplan joined the New York law firm Rumsey & Morgan, whose name was changed to Morgan & Lockwood in 1934. He gained national attention in 1935 when he represented Professor Lienhard Bergel of Rutgers University, who had been fired for opposing Nazi propaganda. The case was a first legal confrontation with fascist ideology on American soil.

Kaplan's legal career soon led him to government service. During the early 1940s, he served as special assistant to the United States Attorney General in the Justice Department, heading the District Court Section of the Claims Division under Assistant Attorney General Francis Shea. He also served as legal counsel on the Senate Interstate Commerce Commission’s Subcommittee on Railroad Finance, where he worked alongside future Nuremberg prosecutor Telford Taylor and Max Lowenthal, a Minneapolis-born lawyer who was instrumental in postwar politics. The commission was chaired by Senator Harry S. Truman.

== World War II and the Nuremberg Trials ==
Kaplan’s most significant contribution came after World War II. In 1945 he was appointed as part of the U.S. legal team at the Nuremberg Trials, which were held to prosecute major Nazi war criminals. As a lieutenant commander, later commander, in the U.S. Coast Guard, Kaplan worked under Robert H. Jackson, the chief American prosecutor. In London, he joined French, British, Russian and other American prosecutors in establishing protocols for the trial and drafting the indictment. On October 18, 1945 he was in Berlin for the filing of the indictment before leaving for Nuremberg for the opening of the trial.

Kaplan was instrumental in organizing the evidence and drafting the sections of the indictment that linked top Nazi officials to the aggressive planning of war. His colleagues at Nuremberg included prominent figures Supreme Court Justice Robert H. Jackson, Telford Taylor, Benjamin Kaplan (no relation), Sidney Alderman, and Thomas Dodd, a future senator from Connecticut. His work on the Nuremberg prosecution helped shape the legal framework for post-war international law. A key figure in the preparation of the trial materials, he was known for his meticulous attention to detail and his ability to coordinate complex evidentiary and procedural issues.

== Post-war career ==
After World War II, Kaplan returned to Minneapolis and co-founded the law firm of Kaplan, Edelman, and Kaplan with his brother Sheldon and his close associate Hyman Edelman, at a time when Jewish lawyers were not generally hired by law firms in that city. In 1956, the three lawyers expanded their practice to become Maslon, Kaplan, Edelman, Joseph and Borman. As of March 2025, that firm, now known as Maslon LLP, is the ninth largest law practice in Minnesota. Through the late 1940s and 1950s, Kaplan’s legal practice continued to grow, and he was particularly known for his skills as a court room litigator and legal strategist. His legal work after the war was concentrated in the field of corporate law and litigation. He was appointed a visiting professor of jurisprudence at the University of Minnesota Law School in 1961.

== Personal life ==
Kaplan was married to Leonore Yaeger, also of Minneapolis. They spent their summers at their lakeside home in Tonka Bay, Minnesota, where he enjoyed a close relationship with his family and colleagues. Kaplan died unexpectedly from a heart attack he suffered at the lake on June 19, 1962, at the age of 53.

== Legacy ==
Kaplan's legacy as a legal scholar and prosecutor endures through his contributions to the establishment of international law and the prosecution of crimes against humanity. A legal scholarship fund at the University of Minnesota established after his death in 1962 continues to support law students at that university. His approach to legal work and his advocacy for justice made him a respected figure both in the legal community and a reference in Nuremberg history, biography and jurisprudence.

== Other sources ==
- Kaplan, Sidney J. “Memorandum for Mr. Justice Jackson. / Subject: Order of Presentation at Trial.” Donovan Nuremberg Trials Collection. November 2, 1945. Accessed March 22, 2025.
- Kellermann, Henry, Robert M. W. Kempner, Sam Harris, et al. “Nuremberg - Document Viewer - Memoranda Concerning the US Prosecution Case, Including Drafting of the Trial Briefs; Staff Assignments; Preparation and Presentation of Briefs, Document Books, and Written Arguments; the Tribunal’s Policy on Documentation; Assignments for Presentation of US Case in Court, Selection of Witnesses; Pre-Trial Meetings and Hearings; the Interpreting Equipment in Court; Films on Concentration Camps; Soviet Holiday Event; Defense Attorneys (November 1945).” Retrieved from the Harvard Law School Library Nuremberg Trials Project. Accessed March 22, 2025.
- “The International Military Tribunal at Nuremberg (November 1945-October 1946).” Robert H. Jackson Center. Accessed March 22, 2025.
