= Carmen Capalbo =

Theater director (1925–2010)

Carmen Capalbo (November 1, 1925 – March 14, 2010) was a theater director on and off Broadway.

Among Capalbo's notable productions were a revival of The Threepenny Opera, which was a major Off-Broadway success, and the 1957 premiere of A Moon for the Misbegotten. He won a Special Tony Award in 1956 for The Threepenny Opera and another in 1957 for The Potting Shed. He also directed the world premiere of Robert Kurka's The Good Soldier Schweik for the New York City Opera at Lincoln Center in 1958.

His 1950 marriage to ballet dancer Patricia (Pat) McBride (later Lousada) ended in divorce in 1961. They had two children, director Marco Capalbo and author and photographer Carla Capalbo.
