= Adelaide Hasse =

American librarian (1868–1953)

Adelaide R. Hasse
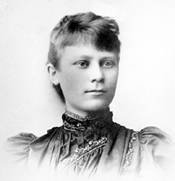
- Photo courtesy of the Government Printing Office
- Born: Adelaide Rosalie Hasse; September 13, 1868; Milwaukee, Wisconsin
- Died: July 28, 1953 (aged 84); Washington, D.C.
- Occupations: Librarian and Bibliographer
- Employer(s): Los Angeles Public Library, Government Printing Office, New York Public Library, War Labor Policies Board, Brookings Institution, George Washington University, Works Progress Administration, Temporary National Economic Committee, Securities and Exchange Commission, Civil Service Commission, Immigration and Naturalization Services
- Known for: Superintendent of Documents system for library classification
- Children: Leslie Maynard (adopted)
- Parent(s): Hermann and Adelaide Trentlage Hasse
- Relatives: Elsa, Hilda, Jessie (sisters), and Carl (brother)

Adelaide Rosalie Hasse (September 13, 1868 – July 28, 1953) was an American librarian. She is listed as one of the "100 most important leaders we had in the 20th century" in the December 1999 edition of American Libraries. She is credited with having developed the Superintendent of Documents Classification system used by the Government Printing Office and Federal Depository Library Program.

== Early life and library beginnings ==
Born in Milwaukee, Wisconsin, Hasse was the first-born of Hermann Edward Hasse, a surgeon of German ancestry, a fact of which she was very proud despite the negative impact it would have on her mid-career. While there is no record of her ever formally attending school, it is assumed that she would have been educated through the local public school system.

Eventually Hasse's family made its way to southern California where she not only earned the title of "Champion Fast Lady Bicycle Rider of Los Angeles," but also obtained her first library job. From 1889 to 1895, Hasse worked under the resolute tutelage of Tessa Kelso, the Head Librarian at the Los Angeles Public Library (LAPL). Hasse and Kelso became lifelong friends in their endeavors to collect, organize, and maintain libraries and their documents as well as making libraries, and the United States, in general, more equitable places for women to work and live.

== Los Angeles Public Library ==
At the age of 20, Hasse was hired on at the LAPL for $40 a month. Melvil Dewey's school had opened two years earlier, but there is no record of Hasse attending. Hasse honed her craft through practical experience, diving into her work with a passion and eagerness that she managed to retain for the remainder of career. In her first six years of library work, she and Kelso developed the LAPL's collection from 6,000 items to 42,000 items. The two also worked to make the LAPL more user-friendly by offering free borrowing privileges, adding additional weekend hours, and allowing check-out of periodicals. Later, they developed a librarian training course that was offered through the library.

When the library officially joined the Federal Depository Library Program in 1891, Hasse set to work on classifying its United States Department of Agriculture documents. The Dewey Decimal Classification (DDC) system was largely in use at this time, but it was not "suitable" for Hasse's needs. She needed a more specific system, and one not classified by author as government documents frequently do not have an author listed beyond the department. Classifying by department seemed to make the most sense; however, this proved equally problematic as many departments begin with the same word. Thus, Hasse devised an inverted, departmental system for classification, e.g., "Agriculture, Dept. of" rather than "Dept. of Agriculture." As her system for government documents differed significantly from the rest of the library's collection, which was organized by DDC, Hasse marked them as a special collection.

During her tenure at the LAPL, Hasse also organized the Santa Barbara, Santa Monica, Pasadena, Riverside, and local normal school collections as well. She also began attending local and national conferences, publishing bibliographies with some regularity, was promoted to First Assistant, and began to go by "Adelaide R." rather than simply, "Addie." Early in her career, Hasse gained the attention of prominent librarians and made a rather notable name for herself in the field.

While Hasse's work with Kelso significantly improved many areas of the LAPL and earned them high marks with outsiders, the duo increasingly found themselves in trouble with the local library board. The board, consisting of men, was unhappy with their frequent travel to conferences, living arrangements, and outspokenness on community issues. After enduring much harassment, pay decreases, threats to cut library funding, and general moral outrage from the board, Hasse and Kelso resigned from their positions in 1895.

== The Government Printing Office and the work that launched her career ==
Upon her departure from the LAPL, Hasse went to work in the newly formed Government Printing Office library program under Francis Crandall. Her assigned task was to collect, organize, and classify government documents from its various departments, divisions, and bureaus. Hasse set to work immediately, uncovering documents from all over Washington, D.C., even going so far as to look in ceilings and behind walls. According to The New York Times article from 1897, Hasse's work "unearth[ing] the heap from the sub-cellar of the Interior Department" took "ten men and four teams six weeks' time to remove the mass to her office" from a room that had supposedly been sealed for almost two decades. Of this experience, Hasse reportedly exclaimed: "I dare say never had a young collector been given such an opportunity to revel in a very orgy of collecting." In fact, in just a little over a year, Hasse had "unearthed" 252,602 volumes.

Once she had all of the documents, she had to come up with a way to classify them. Building on her work with the Department of Agriculture documents at LAPL, she devised a system of letters and numbers that denoted the department, division, document type, and volume or series (if needed). This system is now generally referred to Superintendent of Documents Classification, or SuDocs. While she was collecting and organizing, Hasse continued to regularly publish not only bibliographies of government publications, but also items of other interest such as "Travel and Exploration" that appeared in List of Books for Girls and Women and Their Clubs.

Crandall eventually hired several catalogers to assist in the GPO's work; Edith Clarke was one such employee. Right away, Clarke made it clear to Hasse that their relationship was one of associate, not of supervisor-employee. In both Hasse and Clarke's personal documents, there are vague references to regular squabbling over whether SuDocs or DDC was a better system; Clarke favored the latter, though, and later declared that SuDocs was "indisputable for its special situation." Hasse grew tired of Crandall's lack of recognition for her work and resigned from the GPO in March 1897. Hasse's worries about Crandall were not unfounded as he later accused her of stealing GPO documents and often publicly took the bulk of the credit for the system over which Hasse had so lovingly labored. In the 1980s, Hasse finally received the GPO recognition she deserved when it named a room for her.

== New York City ==
Once again, Hasse left an unpleasant situation only to land in the beginnings of an organization. Hasse had known John Shaw Billings, Director of the recently reorganized New York Public Library (NYPL), for several years and was thrilled to take a position in NYPL's newly created Astor Library. A reporter from The New York Times met Hasse on her second day of work and wrote an article entitled, "Miss Hasse's Unique Task." In it, Hasse described her previous work at the GPO and her hopes for developing a public documents division in New York.

When the NYPL consolidated its borough branches, it was said to have housed "one of the world's greatest collections of government publications," with items dating back to the American colonies. Hasse's work developing and classifying this special collection garnered her praise from the top periodicals in the field, most especially from Library Journal, for which she was a regular contributor. As the leader in document classification, she was selected to serve on the ALA Committee on Public Documents in 1897, and from 1904 to 1908, even served as its chair.

Billings, like Kelso at the LAPL, was a warm, nurturing supervisor to Hasse, giving her free rein to work as she pleased. Due to this freedom, she was able to track down the first book ever published in New York (1693), Narrative of an Attempt Made by the French of Canada Upon the Mohaque's Country, which, coincidentally, also happened to be the first government publication as it was written at the request of the governor. As Hasse increasingly became a household name for librarians, it was only natural that librarians in the Federal Depository system would begin requesting her assistance in dealing with their own documents. She even assisted Oregon employment lawyers in compiling information and documentation to support their cases against the state, as in Muller v. Oregon and Bunting v. Oregon. At a time when women were expected to be seen and not heard, once again, her actions won her more enemies than friends.

In 1911, Hasse was moved to the Documents Division of the NYPL where she was given the additional task of providing reference services, which greatly diminished the time she had available for working on NYPL's massive collection of government and municipal documents. The Documents Division was closely related to the Economics Division, which was led by Charles Williamson. It was at this point that Hasse's reputation as a misandrist and "classic difficult woman, selfish, bad-tempered, and unreasonable" began to unfold. As she was passed over for promotions with some regularity, her less experienced male supervisors sought to undermine her authority and expertise in government documents at every turn. In 1915, the Chief Reference Librarian, Harry Miller Lydenberg, under new NYPL Director Edwin H. Anderson, launched a campaign against her, claiming that her entries were "erroneous or inconsistent." This campaign gathered steam and continued until her termination from the NYPL in 1919. The beginning of the end for Hasse was when Anderson and Lydenberg removed her from her special collection to the Cataloging Division because they claimed that she "refused to 'coordinate' with the cataloging office on her work." After twenty years of cataloging government documents on her own, she was now little more than just another cataloging staff member. Anderson eventually fired Hasse "via a two-sentence letter" and denied her request for a meeting as to why she was fired as well as for a hearing. Patrons of the library were even told not to associate with her when she came in as a patron after her dismissal, and her supporters working in the library, as well as those she hired, were fired soon after.

== The Anderson File ==
From 1917 forward, Hasse would struggle because of her German ancestry, support of the women's suffrage movement and equal pay and working conditions, desire to aggressively market library services, and lack of a husband. Anderson began keeping a file on Hasse, documenting every questionable move she made, even misconstruing legitimate inquiries to suit his needs. He reported her to the United States Secret Service in 1917 for "suspicious activity," which was largely due in part to her seeking other employment with President Wilson's Inquiry group. The Inquiry was formed by President Woodrow Wilson to "collect and organize information for the eventual peace conference" that would occur at the conclusion of World War I. Hasse inquired about work with the group only to find that Lydenberg and Anderson were already heading it up in the basement of the NYPL. Anderson claimed that since she had been born to German parents (her parents were Americans of German heritage) and was at a conference in Germany when the war began, she could not possibly have any other motive for working with The Inquiry other than that as a German spy.

The NYPL special collections division had an extensive collection of Latin American documents. There was, however, a gap in the collection, and in 1918, Hasse asked Anderson for permission to travel to Mexico on a vacation to California to collect the missing documents. Anderson again reported Hasse to the Secret Service for suspicious activity because this was during a time of great unrest in Mexico. She was denied permission to go to Mexico, but while she was in California, her house was searched by the Secret Service no fewer than four times over the course of six weeks. Later in 1918, when the New York city police came to the library to inquire about possible suspicious activity by library employees, Lydenberg readily offered Hasse up to them, claiming she had ties to Jews, Marxism, Trotskyism, and Bolshevism because of a thank you note she had written to him regarding a "Marx book" a patron had requested. Also in 1918, Anderson and Lydenberg hired Edith Clarke, Hasse's colleague from the GPO, who eagerly "came out against Hasse's work" and agreed that she was difficult to work with. The Anderson file also contained accusations that Hasse was a lesbian and was involved in a relationship with Tilloah Squire, an assistant Hasse hired in 1918 to work on the Foreign Relations Index.

As late as 1922, three years after her departure from the NYPL, Anderson was still reporting her to the Justice Department and even worked with J. Edgar Hoover and the Federal Bureau of Investigation (FBI) to open a file on her. The Anderson file is located in the NYPL Archives, which, in addition to the Library of Congress, the National Archives and Records Administration, and FBI, also has their own files on Hasse. As of 2006, the FBI still refuses to release five pages of their file on Hasse.

== Life after the NYPL ==
For the first time in her career, Hasse was out of a job and had no immediate prospects for one. From 1919 to 1923, she conducted research for the War Labor Policies Board, becoming an "expert in the Council of National Defense" and identified herself as a bibliographer rather than a librarian. She went on to found the School for Business Librarians within the Washington School for Secretaries and became editor of Special Libraries. She also wrote an autobiography entitled Compensations of Librarianship, in which she finally had her say against Anderson, Crandall, Clarke, and Lydenberg.

In 1923, she was hired on as a bibliographer for the Brookings Institution through 1932, at which time she was again out of a job, this time for a year. She finally obtained employment as an instructor at George Washington University and as a research consultant for what would later become the Works Progress Administration (WPA), publishing bibliographies of Social Security information. From there she worked temporarily for the Temporary National Economic Committee (TNEC) and then as indexer for the Securities and Exchange Commission (SEC), and later still, as a bibliographer for the Immigration and Naturalization Service.

== Lasting contributions ==
Hasse died on July 28, 1953, with a fifty-four year career in library and information science. In those fifty-four years, Hasse made a significant mark on the field as a library assistant, indexer, cataloguer, classifier, bibliographer, editorial analyst, and author. She was an advocate of "efficient and effective" library service, public access to government materials, and the women's movement. Hasse overcame great obstacles in her quest for providing quick, easy access to materials. American Libraries states that she was best "known for her acerbic personality"; however, Gail K. Nelson and John V. Richardson Jr. state that, regardless of what one may say of her professional relationships and personal life, the basis of the Superintendent of Documents Classification system still in use today was "essentially Hasse's." Because of her work in the GPO, the American public has a system for easily accessing a century's worth of government publications and documents.

== Bibliography ==
- Beck, C. (2006). The new woman as librarian: The career of Adelaide Hasse. Lanham, MD: Scarecrow Press, Inc.
- "GPO living history: Adelaide R. Hasse". Government Printing Office. 2004. Archived from the original on May 9, 2009.
- Grotzinger, Laurel A. (May 1978). "Women Who Spoke for Themselves" (PDF). College & Research Libraries. 39 (3): 175–190. doi:10.5860/crl_39_03_175.
- Hasse, A. R. (1895). Travel and exploration. In A. H. Leypoldt & G. Iles (Eds.), List of books for girls and women and their clubs: With descriptive and critical notes and a list of periodicals and hints for girls' and women's clubs (pp. 55–59). Boston, MA: The Library Bureau.
- Hasse's unique task. (1897, June 2). The New York Times, p. 12[Electronic version]. Retrieved May 1, 2009, from .
- Kniffel, L.; Sullivan, P.; McCormick, E. (1999). "100 of the most important leaders we had in the 20th century". American Libraries. 30 (11): 43.
- Malcomb, L. (2005). "Documents librarianship in Indiana: A historical review". Indiana Libraries. 24 (1): 13–17. hdl:1805/1373.
- Nelson, G. K.; Richardson, John V. Jr. (1986). "Adelaide Hasse and the early history of the U.S. superintendent of documents classification scheme". Government Publications Review. 13: 79–96. doi:10.1016/0277-9390(86)90030-0.
