= RAIC =

RAIC may refer to:

- Royal Architectural Institute of Canada, a Canadian association representing architects
- Redundant Array of Inexpensive Computers, a computer Server farm
- Restricted Area Identity Credential - see Airport security
- Russian-American Industrial Corporation, an international textile manufacturing project in Soviet Russia, 1922-1925
