= Patricia Lousada =

American ballet dancer and cookbook author (1929–2019)

- Born: Patricia Marie McBride; 4 April 1929; Manhattan, New York City, United States
- Died: 8 January 2019 (aged 89); London, England
- Other name: Pat McBride
- Occupations: Ballet dancer, author
- Spouses: Carmen Capalbo (m. 1951; div.); Anthony Lousada (m. 1961; died 1994)
- Partner: John Lowenthal (died 2003)
- Children: 4

Patricia Lousada (born Patricia Marie McBride; 4 April 1929 – 8 January 2019) was an American ballet dancer and later a British-based cookbook author. A founding member of the New York City Ballet, she performed in early works by George Balanchine and later became a writer of cookbooks in the United Kingdom.

== Early life ==
Lousada was born in Manhattan, New York City, to Charles McBride, a stockbroker from Ballybofey, Ireland, and Marie Minon Camera, an opera singer from Piedmont, Italy. After her father lost his fortune in the 1929 crash, the family moved to Bronxville, where her mother worked as a seamstress. Lousada began taking ballet lessons locally and, at age ten, entered the School of American Ballet, founded by Balanchine and Lincoln Kirstein. She received a scholarship when her parents could not afford the tuition.

== Dance career ==
Under the stage name Pat McBride, she performed with Ballet Society, formed in 1946 and later renamed the New York City Ballet. She performed in major productions of Balanchine's most famous collaborations with Igor Stravinsky, such as Orpheus (1948) and Apollo (1951). Lousada also danced in Balanchine's The Four Temperaments (1946), Serenade (1948), The Triumph of Bacchus and Ariadne (1948), Élégie (1948) and in Firebird (1949) as the Princess. In addition she appeared in works by Merce Cunningham, Frederick Ashton, Lew Christensen and Jerome Robbins.

In 1950, photographer Paul Himmel captured her emerging from the sea at Fire Island. The image, nicknamed "Botticelli Girl" was included in the 1955 exhibition The Family of Man at the Museum of Modern Art.

== Later life and death ==
Lousada married theatre director Carmen Capalbo in 1951 and had two children. Following their divorce, she lived in Paris, studied at Le Cordon Bleu, and worked in photography before settling in London in 1961 with her second husband, the lawyer and Tate chairman Anthony Lousada. Lousada ran a small dressmaking business before turning to cookery writing. Her first book, Pasta Italian Style (1981), published by Sainsbury’s, was followed by a series of popular titles that introduced Italian and American dishes to British readers.

Lousada served on the board of the Royal Ballet and remained active in artistic circles. After her husband’s death in 1994, she lived with lawyer and cellist John Lowenthal until his death in 2003. Lousada died of a heart attack while cycling in London on 8 January 2019, aged 89. She was survived by four children among which food writer Carla Capalbo, five grandchildren and a great-grandson.
