= War Labor Policies Board =

Temporary US Government board 1918-1919 for labor issues

Agency overview
- Formed: May 3, 1918
- Dissolved: March 1919
- Jurisdiction: Federal government of the United States
- Headquarters: Washington, D.C.
- Agency executive: Felix Frankfurter, chair

The War Labor Policies Board (WLPB) (1918-1919) was a temporary agency of the United States Government to support American military actions during the end of World War I; future president Franklin Delano Roosevelt was a member.

== History ==
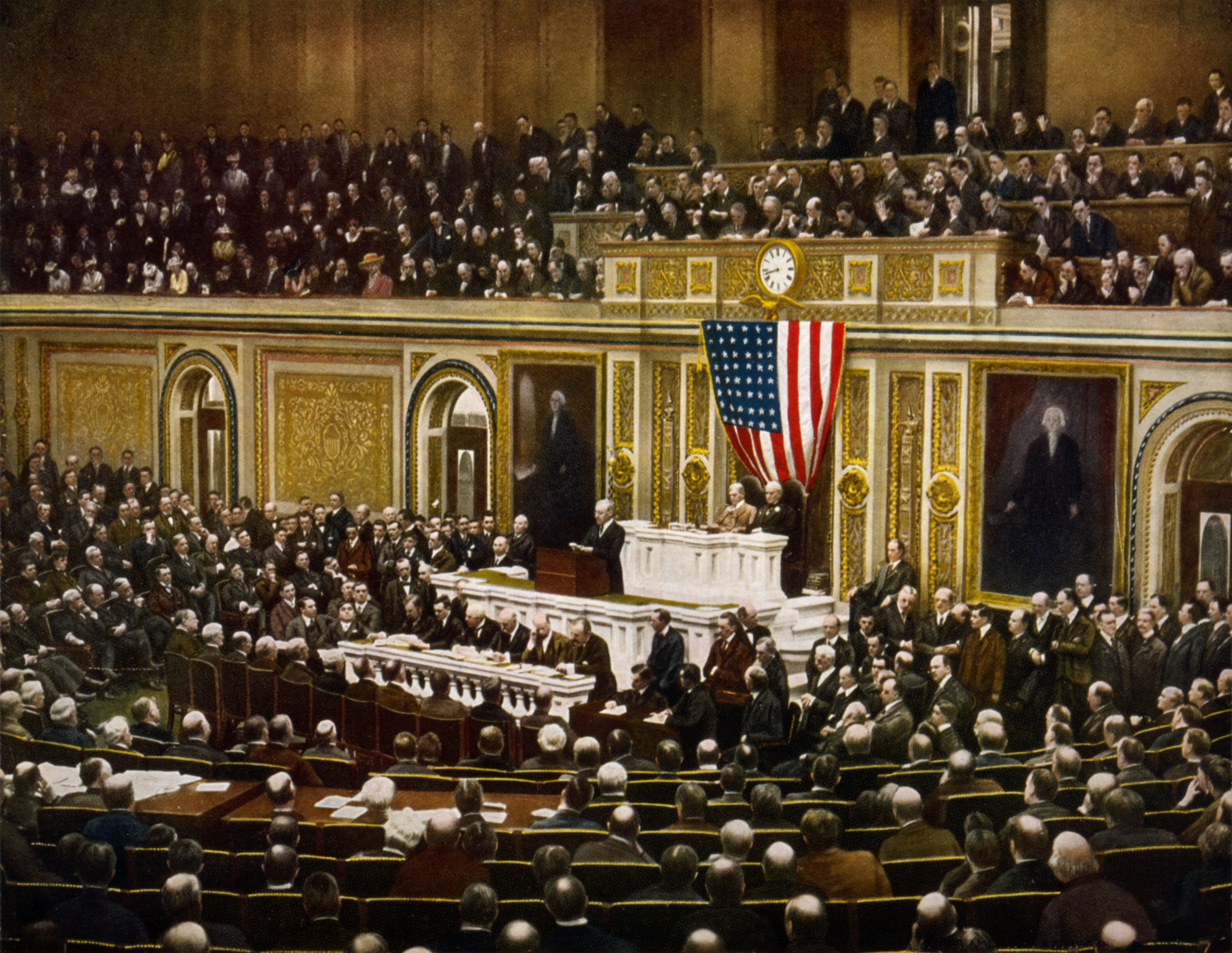
US President Woodrow Wilson asked Congress to declare war on Germany on April 2, 1917

Following the United States declaration of war on Germany in early April 1917, the U.S. "War Labor Administrator" (Secretary of Labor) William Bauchop Wilson established the War Labor Policies Board (WLPB) on May 13, 1918.

According to the Bureau of Industrial Labor, "It was the purpose of this Board to consider and to formulate labor policies affecting the production of war industries, both those directly under Government control and those industry controlled through the contract-letting power, etc... The National War Labor Board was a court of appeal where principles of the Labor Administration were involved in dispute". An early act was to adopt principles and policies of the National War Labor Board. Frankfurter also had a seat on the War Industries Board.

The board formulated unified policies regarding labor administration during World War I. It also promoted improved housing for workers during World War I. After the Armistice of 11 November 1918, the board reviewed how to cancel government contracts and demobilization. It also studied wartime labor conditions at home and abroad, plus US postwar labor policies. Despite numerous recommendations from a member, Mary van Kleeck, who headed the Women in Industry Service group, the Board did not take action to address wage disparities between male and female workers during World War I.

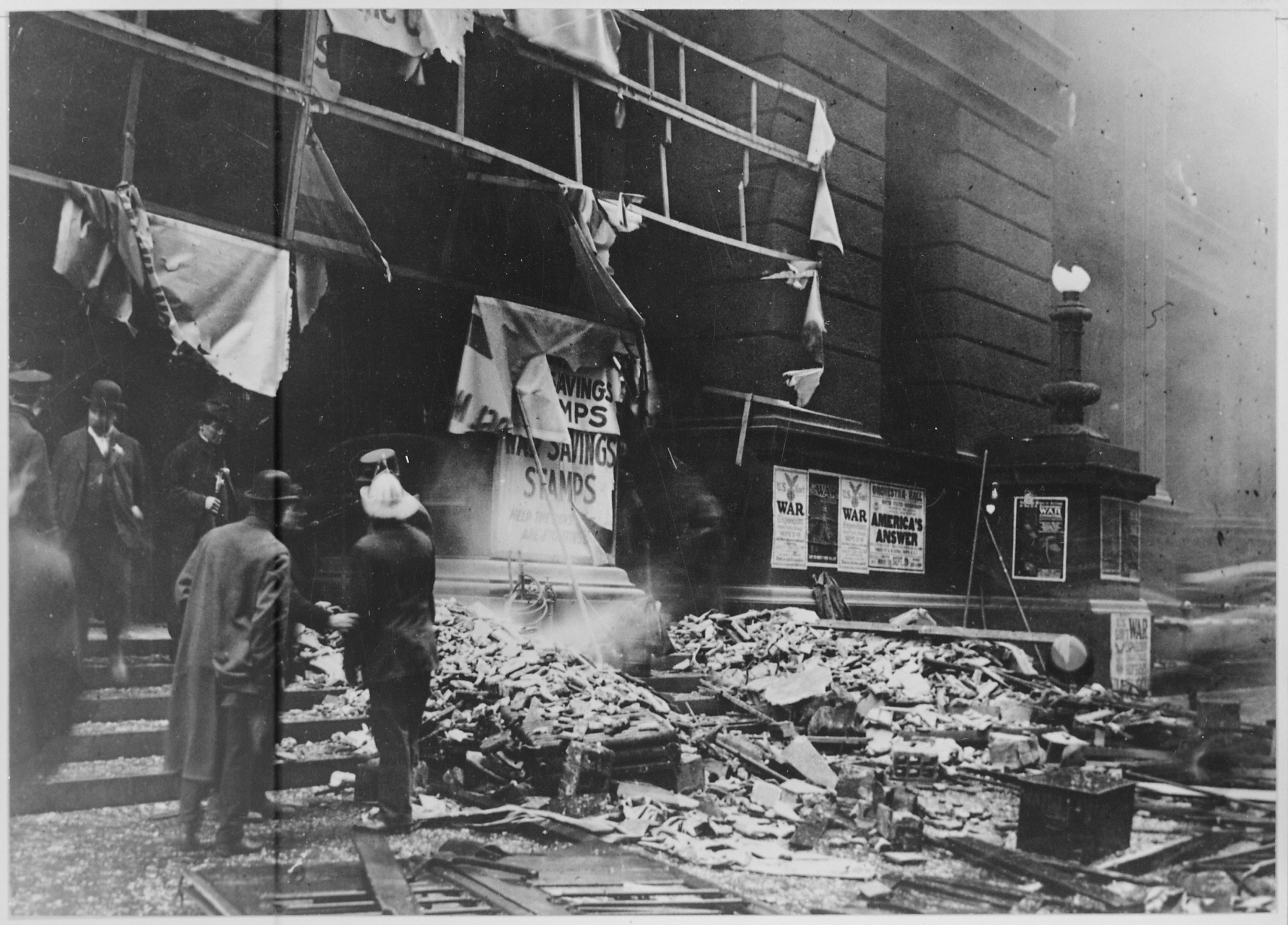
Wreckage of Chicago's Federal Building after bomb explosion allegedly planted by IWW (1918) – indicates politico-socio-economic climate faced by War Labor Policies Board of 1918-1919

The board had only one labor case referred to it by the National War Labor Board.

The board ended in March 1919.

== Organization ==
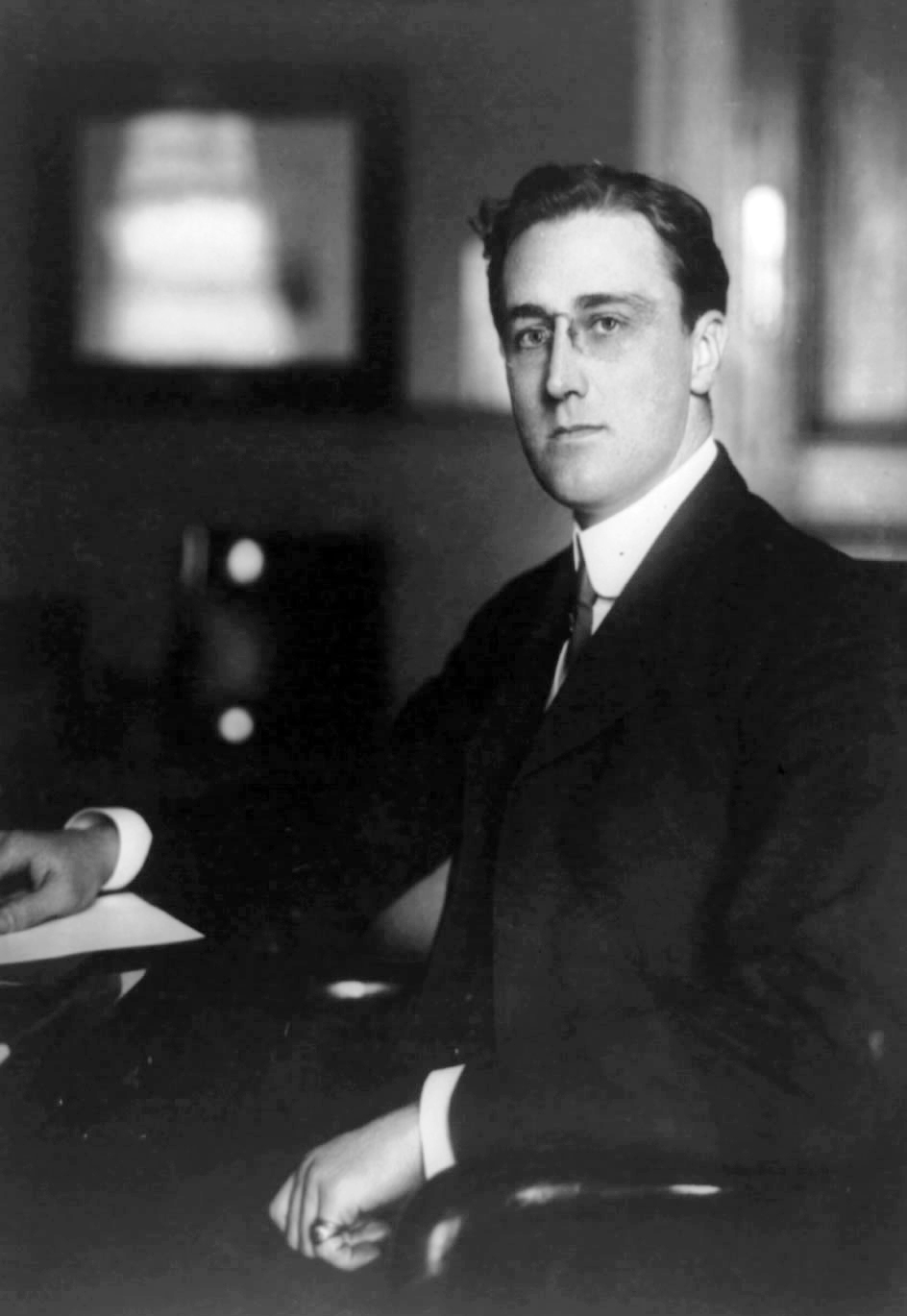
Franklin Delano Roosevelt served the board as the Navy's representative

=== Departmental members ===
The following departments and organizations had representatives on the board.:

- United States Department of Labor (Felix Frankfurter)
- United States Department of War (E.M. Hopkins)
- United States Department of the Navy (Franklin Delano Roosevelt)
- United States Department of Agriculture (G.I. Christie)
- United States War Industries Board (Hugh Frayne)
- United States Shipping Board (Robert P. Bass)
- Emergency Fleet Corporation (later United States Shipping Board Merchant Fleet Corporation) (Charles Piez, Howard Coonley)
- United States Railroad Administration (W.I. Tyler)
- United States Food Administration (M.B. Hammond)
- United States Fuel Administration (John P. White)
- United States Committee on Public Information (W.L Chenery)

=== Board committees ===
Committees of the board included:

- Central Recruiting Committee
- Conditions of Living Committee
- Conference Committee of National Labor Adjustment Agencies
- Distribution of Milk, Ice, and Coal Committee
- Enforcement of State Labor Laws Committee
- Exemption of Skilled Laborers Committee
- Insurance of Industrial Workers Committee
- Price Control Committee
- Relation of Military to Industrial Man-Power Committee
- Standardization of Wages and Conditions of Work Committee
- Stimulation of Production Committee
- Workmen's Compensation Committee

=== Board members ===
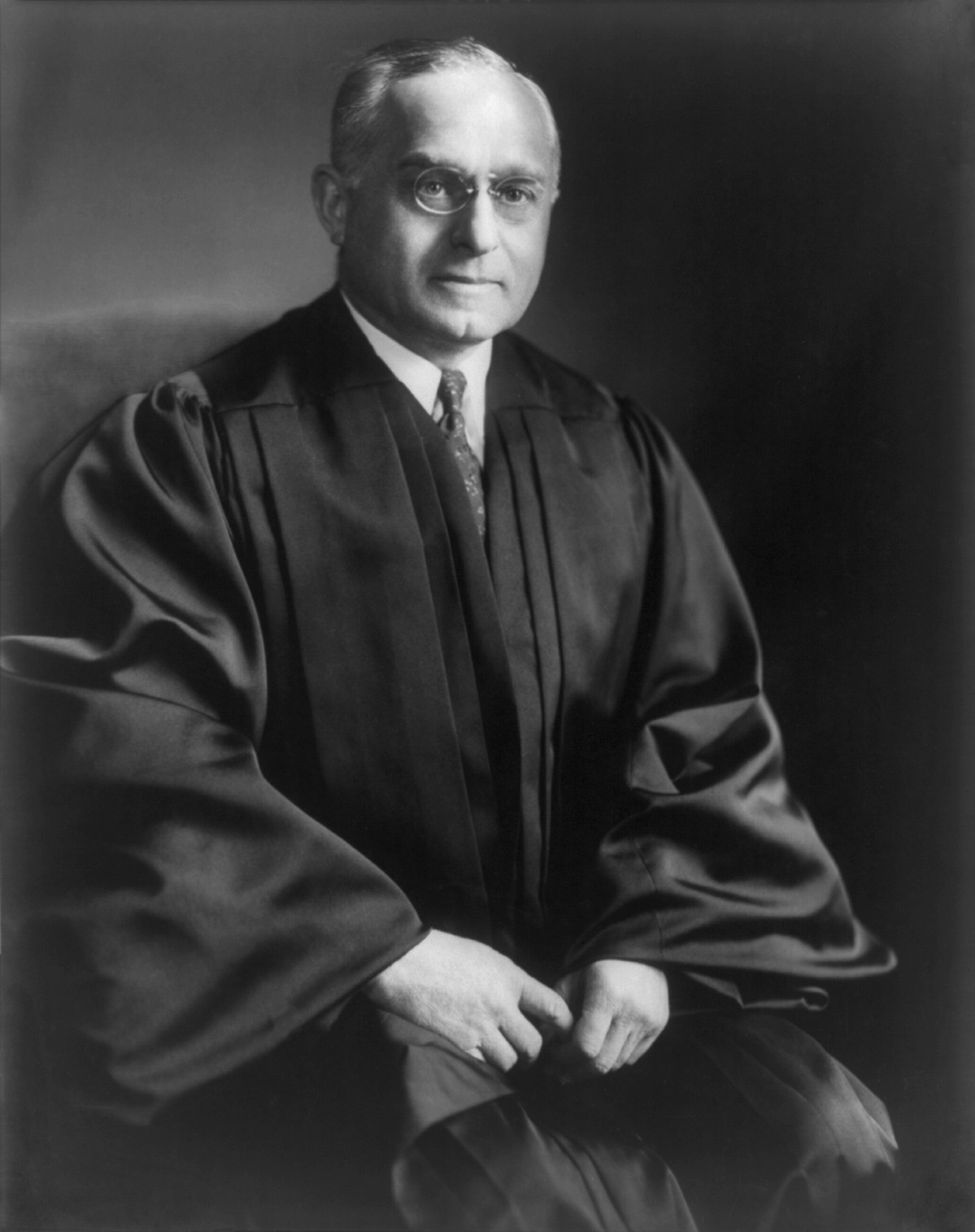
Felix Frankfurter served as the board's chairman

The following people served as executives of the board. Hasse came to the board through Walter Weyl, who wrote on her behalf to Max Lowenthal.:

- Chairman: Felix Frankfurter
  - Max Lowenthal, assistant to the chairman
  - Mary Van Kleeck, director of the Women in Industry Service
  - Research Consultant: Grace Abbott
  - Researcher: Adelaide Hasse
- Executive Secretary: George L. Bell
- Business Adviser (also "Industry Adviser"): Herbert F. Perkins
- Economic Expert: Walton H. Hamilton (and L.C. Marshall)
- Labor Adviser: John R. Alpine (American Federation of Labor)
- Statistics Adviser: F.W. Lamson
- Staffer: Helen Bary

At the time, Frankfurter was serving as Assistant to the Secretary of Labor.

== Legacy ==
In the immediate aftermath of WWI, the Bureau of Industrial Research assessed the War Labor Policies Board as follows:

Secretary of Labor Wilson was appointed by the President to act as War Labor Administrator, a power which he subsequently exercised in large measure through Mr. Frankfurter... Thus Mr. Wilson combined in himself a dual authority... ... While created as a division of the Department of Labor, with a seat in the Labor Cabinet, this Board had virtually become the leglislative body of the National War Labor Administration and may thus be treated independently...

Among other things, the WLPB cemented a friendship between Roosevelt and Frankfurter, who had already met in 1906 and had continued to meet occasionally at the Harvard Club.

Lowenthal lived with Frankfurter in Washington, DC, at that time.

The United States National Archives and Records Administration houses the records of the WLPB.

These records have "the distinction of being Record Group 1 because its records were the first records received by the National Archives in the mid-1930s. The records measure a mere 12 cubic feet, and there are only 7 record series."

== See also ==
- National War Labor Board (1918–1919)
- Timeline of labor issues and events
- American entry into World War I
- United States home front during World War I
- Food and Fuel Control Act
- Victory garden
- Liberty bond
- United States in World War I
