= CODOC =

Library classification system

CODOC is a system of library classification developed at the University of Guelph in the 1960s and 1970s. CODOC is a syllabic abbreviation formed from the words cooperative documents. Unlike Library of Congress Classification, Dewey Decimal Classification, or Universal Decimal Classification, CODOC is not a universal system. Rather, it is intended for use only with government publications. Like many other schemes intended to classify government publications, such as SuDocs, CODOC arranges materials by creator, rather than by subject.

== History ==
The need for a system to better organize government publications was identified in 1966 at the University of Guelph. At that time, government publications were spread throughout various libraries and classified using a wide variety of schemes. The library hired Margaret Beckman to design an automated system that would provide access to all of the government publications in the library's collections. Beckman designed and implemented a system on a GEAC 800 microcomputer. The system was originally known as the Guelph Documents System.

In 1972, ownership and operation of CODOC was transferred to the created Ontario Universities' Library Cooperative System (OULCS) Documents Project, and the project was renamed CODOC to reflect its cooperative nature.

== Structure ==
Unlike SuDocs, which is intended for use only with United States federal government publications, CODOC can classify the documents of any government at any level, as well as those of non-governmental organizations. Each call number begins with a two-letter code designating the country or non-governmental agency. This is followed by a number designating the level of government (1 or national, 2 for province or state, 3 for county, etc.), then by optional two-letter codes designating province, territory, or state. The codes indicating geography are followed by alphabetical codes indicating the department or agency that published the material, then numeric codes indicating the branch of that agency. The individual title is identified by numbers indicating the year and an alphanumeric code that designates the individual book or journal.

The example below breaks down the parts of a CODOC call number using the example of Report of the Ontario Health Survey Committee, with the call number CA2 ON H670 50R25.

Breakdown of the call number CA2 ON H670 50R25
geographic codes			agency codes		unique identifiers	
country	level of government	province	agency	subagency	year	book number
CA	2	ON	H	670	50	R25
Canada	provincial	Ontario	Ministry of Health	Ontario Health Survey Committee	1950	report

== CODOC versus MARC ==
Some institutions have converted their CODOC records to MARC records. Here is an example of the same record in each format.

=== CODOC ===
0001 ........
0002 CA1 Z 160G05A ENG SSM WRBKMS 8 880510
...@.......
0003 111CANADA. ROYAL COMMISSION ON GOVERNMENT ORGANIZATION
0004 211REPORT OF THE ROYAL COMMISSION ON GOVERNMENT ORGANIZATION - V.5 - THE OR
0005 212GANIZATION OF THE GOVERNMENT OF CANADA - SUMMARY OF PROPOSALS FOR REORGA
0006 213NIZATION - ABRIDGED EDITION.
0007 221REPORT OF THE ROYAL COMMISSION ON GOVERNMENT ORGANIZATION - V.5 BUSINESS
0008 222 MINISTERS ADMINISTRATION DIRECTION DUTIES ASSIGNMENTS COORDINATION BOAR
0009 223DS IDENTITY LICENCING REGULATION ADJUDICATION OPERATIONS AUTHORITY SHFT.
0010 231DEVILUTION PUBLIC TRANSPORT EXECUTIVE RESPONSIBILITIES MANAGEMENT SHFT.
0011 911ORGANIZATIONAL CHART OF THE FEDERAL GOVERNMENT BUREAUCRACY FOLDS OUT OF
0012 912BACK COVER.

=== MARC ===
000 00829nam 2200133 4500
008 s1960 xxc f eng+
110 1 $aCanada. Royal Commission on Government Organization.+
245 10$aReport of the Royal Commission on Government Organization : V.5 - the O
rganization of the Government of Canada - Summary of Proposals for Reorganizatio
n - Abridged Edition.+
300 $a1 v.+
500 $aOrganizational Chart of the Federal Government Bureaucracy Folds Out of
Back Cover.+
653 0 $aReport of the Royal Commission on Government Organization : V.5 Business
Ministers Administration Direction Duties Assignments Coordination Boards Iden
tity Licencing Regulation Adjudication Operations Authority+
653 0 $aDevilution Public Transport Executive Responsibilities Management+
852 $bFED$hCA1 Z 160G05A +
949 $uGOVDOC+
