= Margaret Armstrong Beckman =

Canadian librarian

- Born: 1925
- Died: February 28, 2008 (aged 82–83); Waterloo, Ontario
- Education: Waterloo College, University of Toronto
- Occupation: Librarian
- Employers: University of Guelph; University of Waterloo; University of Western Ontario

Margaret Armstrong Beckman (1925 – February 28, 2008) was a Canadian librarian who was best known for her expertise in library design and catalogue automation. She was named Librarian of the Year by the Association of College and Research Libraries 1986.

== Early life and education ==
Beckman was born in Hartford, Connecticut in 1925. She graduated from Waterloo College (since renamed Wilfrid Laurier University), in 1946 with a Bachelor of Arts. She went on to complete a Bachelor of Library Science at the University of Toronto in 1949 and a Master of Library Science from the same school in 1969.

== Career ==
Early on in her career Beckman was turned down for a job at the London Public Library because of a rule against employing married women. She eventually landed a job at the University of Western Ontario where women were expected to vacate their positions before the fourth month of a pregnancy. A supervisor allowed her to continue working for an additional three months provided she stay in the basement, out of sight. She later worked at the University of Waterloo serving as the head of cataloguing (1959-1964) and director of technical services (1964-1966).

Beckman joined the University of Guelph Library in 1966. She played an active role in the planning of the school's McLaughlin Library working closely with the building architects. Beckman also played an integral role in pushing forward automation efforts at the library and was recognized as a leader in the field of automated catalogues. She developed CODOC, a unified system for categorizing government documents, as part of her Masters thesis based on work undertaken at the Library. Beckman was named Chief Librarian in 1971 and was the only woman to hold such a position in Ontario at the time. She served in the role until 1984 at which point she was the school's Executive Director of information technology.

Beckman was named Librarian of the Year by the Association of College and Research Libraries in 1986. She received the award in recognition of her "authority in the areas of library management, automation and building design."

In 1990 papers were presented at the International Essen Symposium in her honor.

Beyond her academic library work, Beckman served on the Waterloo Public Library Board from 1960 to 1968. Early on in her tenure she called into question the city's commitment to children given the absence of services aimed at providing access to library books by way of mobile or on-site librarians at schools. She also caused a stir by commenting on the quality of popular books series like Nancy Drew and the Hardy Boys. She believed that Bobbsey Twins represented inferior writing reflective of the type of books to be avoided when purchasing on a limited budget.

Beckman died in Waterloo, Ontario on February 28, 2008.

== Select publications ==
=== Articles ===
- "Experiment in the Use of The Revised Code of Cataloguing Rule" (PDF). Library Resources and Technical Services. 5 (3): 216–220. Summer 1961.
- "Why not the Bobbsey Twins?". Library Journal. 89: 4612–13, 4627. 1964.
- "Public Access at the University of Guelph Library". ERIC ED210018: Public Access to Library Automation. Clinic on Library Applications of Data Processing: 37–48. 1981.
- "Online Catalog Development at the University of Guelph" (PDF). Library Trends. 35 (4): 527–37. Spring 1987.

=== Books ===
- New Library Design: Guide Lines to Planning Academic Library Buildings. Toronto: J. Wiley & Sons Canada. 1970. ISBN 0471517178.
- Documentation System for the Organization of Government Publications within a University Library. Library Administration. 1969. OCLC 967292936.
- The Best Gift: A Record of the Carnegie Libraries in Ontario. Toronto [Ont.]: Dundurn Press. 1984. ISBN 9781554883110.
