= Superintendent of Documents Classification =

Superintendent of Documents Classification, commonly called as SuDocs or SuDoc, is a system of library classification developed and maintained by the United States Government Publishing Office. Unlike Library of Congress Classification, Dewey Decimal Classification, or Universal Decimal Classification, SuDocs is not a universal system. Rather, it is intended for use only with publications of the Federal Government of the United States. Also, SuDocs does not organize materials by subject, but by the agency that created those materials, making it a provenance-based or archival classification system.

SuDocs call numbers are assigned by the Government Publishing Office as new publications are produced. Many libraries that participate in the Federal Depository Library Program employ SuDocs to classify their collections.

== History ==
Superintendent of Documents Classification took form around 1891, when Adelaide Hasse was given the task of organizing the government publications held at the Los Angeles Public Library. Rather than organize publications by subject, she instead organized them by provenance, that is, the government agency that issued them. Hasse applied her system to a list of publications of the Department of Agriculture in 1895. Her system was adopted by the office of the Superintendent of Documents in 1895. William Leander Post, head of the Government Printing Office's Public Documents Library, assigned new symbols for government agencies, allowing for the expansion of the system to accommodate all federal agencies.

== Structure ==
SuDocs call numbers consist of two main parts: a class stem, and a suffix. The class stem brings together related publications, while the suffix is a unique identifier for a publication. The example below breaks down the part of a SuDocs call number using the example of Cybersecurity: deterrence policy, with the call number LC 14.23:R 47011.

Breakdown of the call number LC 14.23:R 47011
class stem			suffix	
department or agency	subordinate office	series	book number	
LC	14.	23:	R	47011/
Library of Congress	Congressional Research Service	CRS report	Report	report number 47011

=== Departments and agencies ===
Departments and agencies are assigned letter author symbols. As of 2022, the following letter author symbols are in use:

- A Department of Agriculture
- AE National Archives and Records Administration
- B U.S. Agency for Global Media
- C Department of Commerce
- CC Federal Communications Commission
- CR Commission on Civil Rights
- D Department of Defense
- E Department of Energy
- ED Department of Education
- EP Environmental Protection Agency
- FA Commission of Fine Arts
- FCA Farm Credit Administration
- FHF Federal Housing Finance Agency
- FM Federal Mediation and Conciliation Service
- FMC Federal Maritime Commission
- FR Federal Reserve System Board of Governors
- FT Federal Trade Commission
- FTZ Foreign-Trade Zones Board
- GA Government Accountability Office
- GP Government Publishing Office
- GS General Services Administration
- HE Department of Health and Human Services
- HH Department of Housing and Urban Development
- HS Department of Homeland Security
- I Department of the Interior
- IC Interstate Commerce Commission
- ID U.S. Agency for International Development
- ITC International Trade Commission
- J Department of Justice
- JU Judiciary
- L Department of Labor
- LC Library of Congress
- LR National Labor Relations Board
- MS Merit Systems Protection Board
- NAS National Aeronautics and Space Administration
- NC National Capital Planning Commission
- NCU National Credit Union Administration
- NF National Foundation on the Arts and the Humanities
- NMB National Mediation Board
- NS National Science Foundation
- P United States Postal Service
- PE Peace Corps
- PM Personnel Management Office
- PR President of the United States
- PREX Executive Office of the President
- PRVP Vice President of the United States
- RR Railroad Retirement Board
- S Department of State
- SBA Small Business Administration
- SE Securities and Exchange Commission
- SI Smithsonian Institution
- SSA Social Security Administration
- T Department of the Treasury
- TD Department of Transportation
- TDA U.S. Trade and Development Agency
- VA Department of Veterans Affairs
- X Congress
- Y Congress

X and Y are used for the United States Congress. Boards and agencies created by Congress (versus those created by the Executive Branch) are assigned call numbers beginning with Y 3, and publications of congressional committees are assigned call numbers beginning with Y 4.

=== Subordinate offices ===
Subordinate offices are designated by numbers. The number 1 is reserved for the parent agency, while later numbers are used for subordinate bureaus and offices. For example, I 1 designates the main office of the Department of the Interior, while I 19 designates the United States Geological Survey, I 29 designates the National Park Service, and I 33 designates the U.S. Board on Geographic Names. These latter three examples are all divisions of the Department of the Interior.

Subordinate office numbers generally range from 1-99, although the Department of Defense uses higher numbers. There is a space between the letter author symbol and the subordinate office.

=== Category classes ===
Category classes are used to group together the types of publications that federal agencies commonly issue. The numbers 1-14 are reserved for the most commonly created publications:

1. Annual reports
2. General publications (i.e. publications that do not fall into other classes and which are not part of series)
3. Bulletins
4. Circulars
5. Laws
6. Regulations, rules, and instructions
7. Press releases
8. Handbooks, manuals, and guides
9. Bibliographies and lists of publications
10. Directories
11. Maps and charts
12. Posters
13. Forms
14. Addresses

Numbers after 14 are assigned to series. Publications in the series CRS Reports are assigned the number 23, as shown in the example above.

=== Book numbers ===
The final component of the call number is the book number. Depending on the type of publication, this may be a Cutter number, a volume number, or some other special designation reserved for the series in question.

== Related classification systems ==
The Canadian equivalent of SuDocs is the CODOC system, which was created in 1966 at the University of Guelph. A number of U.S. states, including Arizona, Colorado, and North Carolina employ similar provenance-based classification systems to organize their state publications.
