= Hugh Frayne =

American labor leader (1869–1934)

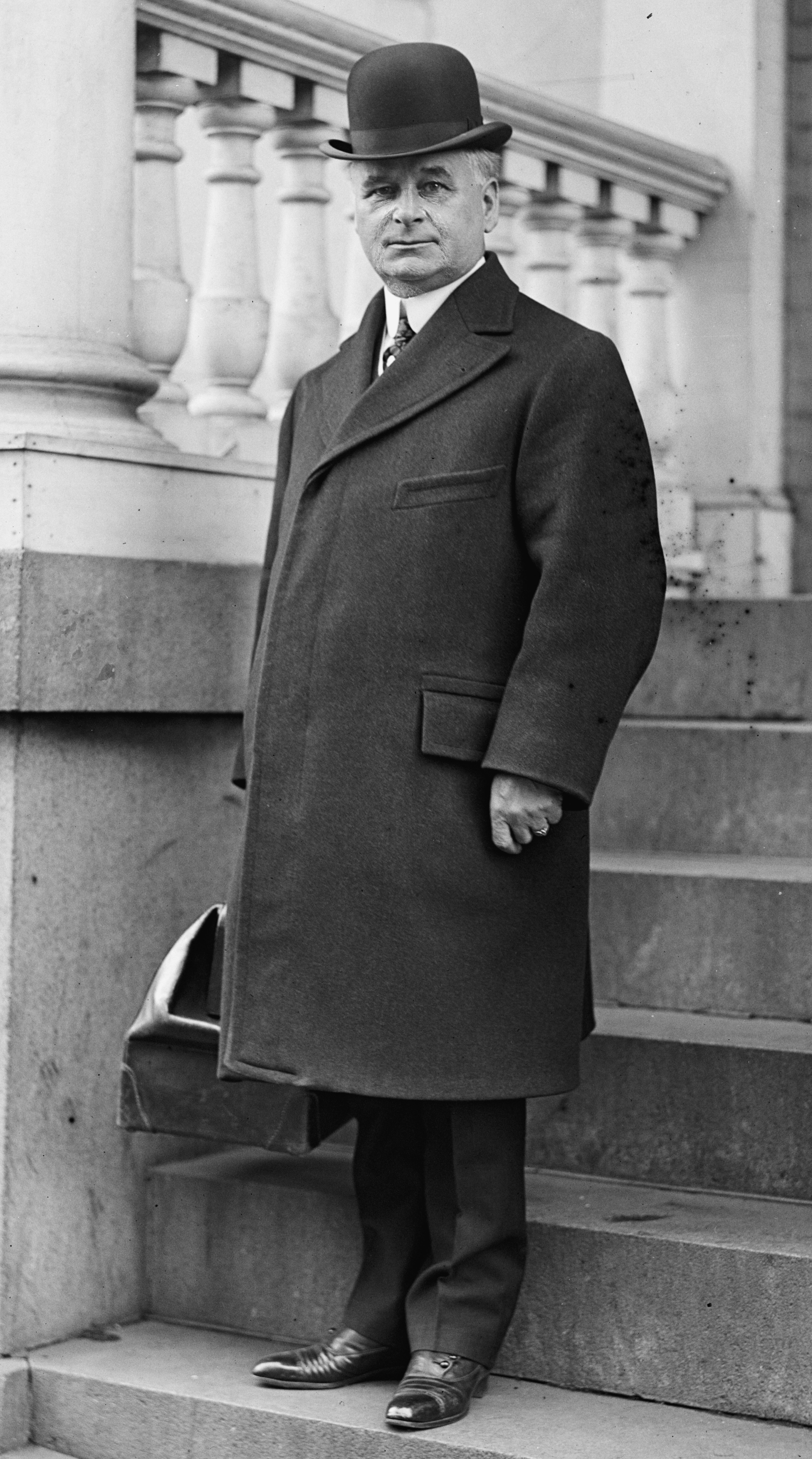
- Frayne in 1917
- Born: November 8, 1869; Scranton, Pennsylvania, U.S.
- Died: July 12, 1934 (aged 64); New York City, U.S.
- Resting place: Cathedral Cemetery; Scranton, Pennsylvania, U.S.
- Occupation: Labor leader
- Spouse: Mary E. Cawley (m. 1869)
- Children: 3
- Awards: Distinguished Service Medal

Hugh Frayne (November 8, 1869 – July 12, 1934) was an American labor leader. He worked for the American Federation of Labor in Pennsylvania and New York City. He was chairman of the labor division of the War Industries Board during World War I. He received the Distinguished Service Medal in 1922 for his service to the board.

== Early life ==
Hugh Frayne was born on November 8, 1869, in Scranton, Pennsylvania, to Grace (née Deacon) and Michael Frayne. At the age of eight, he worked as a breaker boy in North Scranton. He traveled with Primrose and West as a minstrel.

== Career ==
Frayne worked in the business of sheet metal for Ambrose Mulley and W. C. Cowles of Providence. He then worked for the Howley Brothers. He became an organizing member of the sheet metal union and served as general vice president of the sheet metal workers' organization from 1901 to 1904. He was a delegate to the Scranton Central Labor Union. He then worked as an organizer for the American Federation of Labor (AFL) in northeastern Pennsylvania for nine years until early 1910. In July 1910, he moved to AFL's New York office. His office was at 1416 Broadway.

In July 1917, President Woodrow Wilson appointed Frayne to the War Industries Board as a representative of labor. He organized the prison labor and national waste reclamation section of the board's labor division. He became chairman of the labor division and served until the board dissolved on January 1, 1919. He also served on the War Labor Policies Board organized by Felix Frankfurter to maintain industrial peace during the war. For his efforts in the board during World War I, he received the Distinguished Service Medal on May 17, 1922. He was active in prison reform work in New York City and received a gold medal from the National Committee on Prisons and Prison Labor in 1920. On November 11, 1920, he was appointed as a member of the military hospital commission. After William Green became president of the AFL, he worked as one of his aides. In December 1932, he was one of three receivers who took control of the New York local of the Motion Picture Operators Union.

Frayne was director of the National Tuberculosis Association and a trustee of the Near East Relief.

== Personal life ==
Frayne married Mary E. Cawley on November 8, 1869. They had three sons, Joseph, John and Hugh Jr. He was friends with Samuel Gompers and William Green. He was a dancer. Later in life, he lived primarily in New York City, but also maintained a home at 1645 North Church Avenue in Scranton.

Frayne had an operation. Ten days later, on July 12, 1934, he died at Wickersham Hospital in New York City. He was interred at Cathedral Cemetery in Scranton. Labor leaders William Green and Thomas Kennedy attended his funeral.
