= National War Labor Board (1918–1919) =

United States government agency

Agency overview
- Formed: April 8, 1918
- Dissolved: May 31, 1919
- Jurisdiction: Federal government of the United States
- Headquarters: Washington, D.C.
- Employees: 250
- Agency executive: William Howard Taft and Frank P. Walsh, co-chairs

The National War Labor Board (NWLB) was an agency of the United States government established on April 8, 1918 to mediate labor disputes during World War I.

== History ==
The board was appointed by President Woodrow Wilson. It was composed of twelve members, including five representatives each from business and the American Federation of Labor (AFL), as well as co-chairs Frank P. Walsh and former president William Howard Taft.

The decisions of the NWLB generally supported and strengthened the position of labor. Although it opposed the disruption of war production by strikes, it supported an eight-hour day for workers, equal pay for women, and the right to organize unions and bargain collectively. Although the NWLB had no coercive enforcement power, public pressure during the war period often led to voluntary agreements between labor and employers. Notably, when Western Union refused to bargain with its employees that had joined the Commercial Telegraphers Union of America, President Woodrow Wilson ordered the temporary nationalization of Western Union's vast telegram line network for the duration of the war to avoid a strike. This action gave the NWLB far more power in its work for the rest of the war, and strengthened the position of labor during the time.

In general, the relative strength of organized labor in America grew substantially during the war. Union membership almost doubled after the formation of the NWLB. Of note, membership in the AFL rose from two million in 1916 to over three million in 1919. By the end of the decade, fifteen percent of the nonagricultural work force was unionized.

In all, the board ruled on 1,245 cases. Almost ninety percent of them sprang from worker complaints, and five skilled trades accounted for 45 percent. Of the cases, 591 were dismissed, 315 were referred to other federal labor agencies, and 520 resulted in formal awards or findings. In reaching decisions, the board was aided by an office and investigative staff of 250 people. Approximately seven hundred thousand workers in one thousand establishments were directly affected.

The board was disbanded on August 12, 1919.

== Membership ==
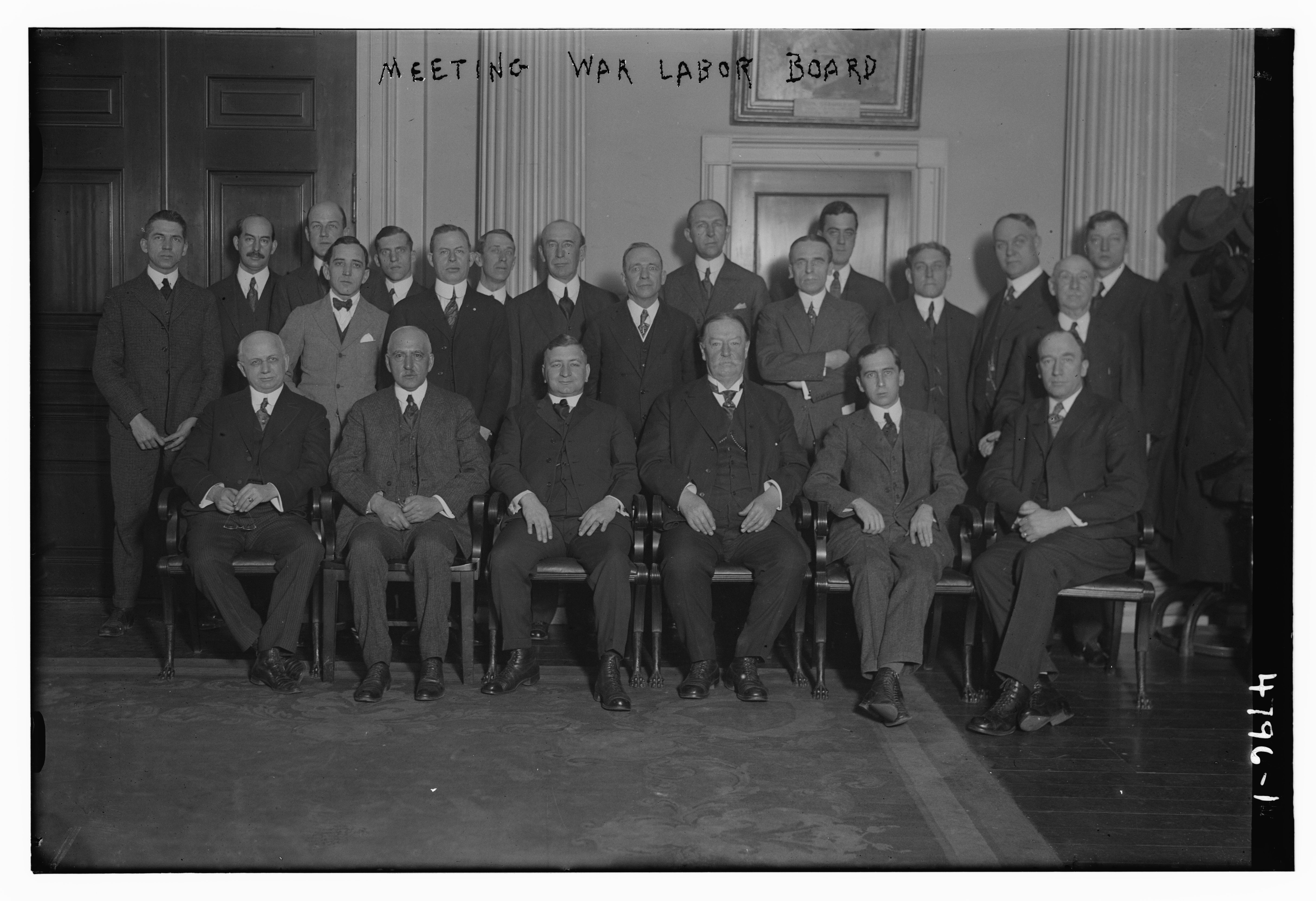
Meeting of the War Labor Board in New York, January 1919; co-chairs Taft and Manley are third and second from the right in the seated row, respectively

The twelve members of the board were:

- William Howard Taft
- Frank P. Walsh, first head of the Commission on Industrial Relations
- Frank Hayes, president of the United Mine Workers
- Thomas Savage of the International Association of Machinists, now the International Association of Machinists and Aerospace Workers
- William Hutcheson, leader of the United Brotherhood of Carpenters and Joiners of America
- Victor Olander of the International Seamen's Union
- Thomas A. Rickert, president of the United Garment Workers of America
- L.F. Loree, president of the Delaware and Hudson Railway
- C. Edwin Michael, former official of the National Association of Manufacturers
- Loyall A. Osborne, vice president of Westinghouse
- W.H. van Dervoort, an East Moline, Illinois, manufacturer
- B.L.T. Worden, head of the Electric Boat Company

Following the resignation of Walsh as one of the co-chairs in December of 1918, he was replaced by his assistant Basil M. Manly.

== See also ==
- War Labor Policies Board (1918–1919)
- National War Labor Board (1942–1945)
