= Temporary National Economic Committee =

The Temporary National Economic Committee (TNEC) was established by a joint resolution of the United States Congress on June 16, 1938, and operated until its defunding on April 3, 1941. The TNEC's function was to study the concentration of economic power and to report to Congress with its findings.

Many records of the TNEC are still under seal according to the US National Archives:

As specified by the SEC, no one, except government officials for official purposes, may have access to records created and filed by the SEC on behalf of the TNEC, except for the following: certain records relating to the insurance study, consisting of replies to formal questionnaires (but not including replies to questionnaires sent to state supervisory officials and replies to the questionnaire of February 9, 1940, to life insurance agents); exhibits, including rate books and form insurance policies; and all conventional-form annual statements.

According to Irving Katz's 1969 article in the Business History Review, the TNEC's official report was "valuable, if one-sided".
