= Jerry N. Hess =

American oral historian of U.S. presidential libraries

Jerry N. Hess (1931–2017) was a 20th-Century American oral historian of U.S. presidential libraries, particularly the Harry S. Truman Library: his name appears in numerous books which include research into major personalities related to mid-20th-Century American national politics and draw upon the more than 500 oral histories available at the Truman Library alone.

== Background ==
Hess was born on September 24, 1931, in Cedar Vale, Kansas. His parents were James Nelson and Mary Elixabeth Burge. He had one older brother, Norman Burge Hess. He obtained a BA from Kansas State University of Lawrence and MA from the University of Missouri at Kansas City.

== Career ==
In 1951, Hess entered the U.S. Navy, where he served until 1955.

Hess served as an oral historian for President Harry S. Truman Library as well as the National Archives in Washington, D.C. He helped develop other presidential libraries.

After retirement, he volunteered as an oral archivist for the Ringling Circus.

== Oral histories ==
Hess's Truman Library interviewees include:

- George E. Allen
- Vernice Anderson
- Eben A. Ayers
- John E. Barriere
- Jack L. Bell
- David K. E. Bruce
- Tom C. Clark
- Bruce C. Clarke
- Clark Clifford
- William K. Divers
- General William H. Draper Jr.
- George M. Elsey
- Stanley R. Fike
- Edward T. Folliard
- Joseph A. Fox
- Clayton Fritchey
- Warner Gardner
- Roswell Gilpatric
- Charles J. Greene
- William H. Hastie
- Judge Richmond B. Keech
- E. W. Kenworthy
- Milton S. Kronheim, Sr.
- David L. Lawrence
- Gould Lincoln
- Max Lowenthal
- John J. Muccio
- Philleo Nash
- Frank Pace Jr.
- John W. Snyder
- Stephen J. Spingarn
- John L. Sullivan
- Theodore Tannenwald, Jr.
- Phillip W. Voltz

== Personal life ==
Hess was a 32nd Degree Mason with life membership in the Scottish Rite Valley of Tampa. He was also a member of: the Grand Chapter of Royal Arch Masons of Missouri, the Sons of the American Revolution, the American Legion and Veterans of Foreign Wars, and the Shriners International.

On June 4, 1960, Hess married Barbara H. Neubauer; she died in 1994. In 1998, he married Bertie Lee Ruth; she died in 2016. In 2006, he and Bertie moved to Sunnyside, Florida.

Hess died age 85 on June 23, 2017, at Doctor’s Hospital in Sarasota, Florida.

== External sources- ==
- Truman Library: Oral History Interviews (more than 500)
- Truman Library: Photo of Hess et al. (1958)
