= Carla Capalbo =

English-American food writer, journalist, and author

- Education: University of Sussex; Saint Martin's School of Art
- Occupations: Food writer; journalist; author
- Website: carlacapalbo.com

Carla Capalbo is an American-born British food writer, journalist, and author. She specialises in Italian and Georgian wine and cuisine.

== Early life and education ==
Capalbo was born in New York to parents of Italian and Irish descent. After spending her early childhood in Paris, Capalbo grew up in Chiswick, West London upon her mother Patricia Lousada remarrying.

Capalbo attended St Paul's Girls' School. She graduated from the University of Sussex with a Bachelor of Arts (BA) in History of Art and Saint Martin's School of Art.

== Career ==
Capalbo writes regularly for magazines and newspapers, including Decanter, National Geographic, BBC Olive, The Independent, The World of Fine Wine, Bon Appétit, Departures, and Food & Wine. She is a long-time member of Slow Food, the Guild of Food Writers, and the Circle of Wine Writers and has won Italy's Luigi Veronelli prize for best foreign food writer. In 2017 she featured in the BBC Radio 4 Food Programme's documentary on the food and wine of Georgia.

Saveur called her book Tasting Georgia "without question the best book ever written in English about Georgian food and wine."

== Selected works ==
- The Ultimate Italian Cookbook (1998)
- The Food and Wine Lover's Companion to Tuscany (2002)
- Tasting Georgia (2016)
