= Julian Mack =

American judge (1866–1943)

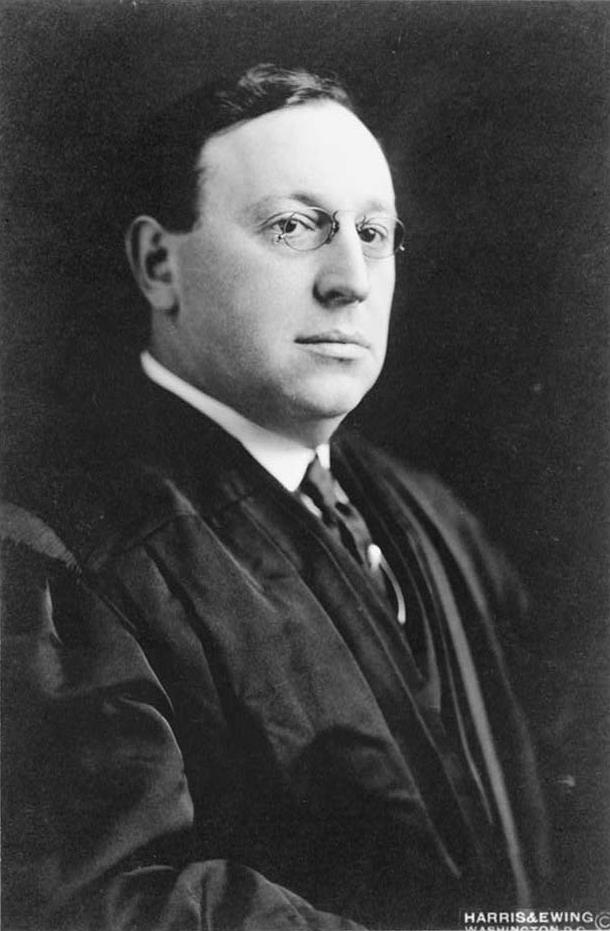

Senior Judge of the United States Court of Appeals for the Second Circuit
- In office September 6, 1940 – September 5, 1943

Judge of the United States Court of Appeals for the Second Circuit
- In office July 1, 1929 – September 6, 1940
- Appointed by: operation of law
- Preceded by: Seat established by 36 Stat. 539
- Succeeded by: Seat abolished

Judge of the United States Court of Appeals for the Sixth Circuit
- In office July 1, 1929 – June 30, 1930
- Appointed by: operation of law
- Preceded by: Seat established by 36 Stat. 539
- Succeeded by: Seat abolished

Judge of the United States Court of Appeals for the Seventh Circuit
- In office January 31, 1911 – July 1, 1929
- Appointed by: William Howard Taft
- Preceded by: Seat established by 36 Stat. 539
- Succeeded by: Seat abolished

Judge of the United States Circuit Courts for the Seventh Circuit
- In office January 31, 1911 – December 31, 1911
- Appointed by: William Howard Taft
- Preceded by: Seat established by 36 Stat. 539
- Succeeded by: Seat abolished

Judge of the United States Commerce Court
- In office January 31, 1911 – December 13, 1913
- Appointed by: William Howard Taft
- Preceded by: Seat established by 36 Stat. 539
- Succeeded by: Seat abolished

Personal details
- Born: Julian William Mack; July 19, 1866 San Francisco, California, U.S.
- Died: September 5, 1943 (aged 77) New York City, New York, U.S.
- Education: Harvard University (LLB); University of Berlin; University of Leipzig

Julian William Mack (July 19, 1866 – September 5, 1943) was a United States circuit judge of the United States Commerce Court, the United States Court of Appeals for the Seventh Circuit, the United States Circuit Courts for the Seventh Circuit, the United States Court of Appeals for the Second Circuit and the United States Court of Appeals for the Sixth Circuit.

== Early life and career ==
Mack was born on July 19, 1866, in San Francisco, California, the son of William Jacob and Rebecca (Tandler) Mack. His father, who came from Bavaria in about 1849, was a Jewish merchant, engaged in business successively in Cincinnati, Ohio, Terre Haute, Indiana, San Francisco, California, and again in Cincinnati. Mack received his early education in the public schools of Cincinnati, then received a Bachelor of Laws in 1887 from Harvard Law School. He graduated at the top of his class, and was selected as the class orator for graduation in 1887. Encouraged by Harvard law professors, Mack and several of his classmates founded the Harvard Law Review. He served as its first business manager and as a member of the editorial board. He received a Parker Fellowship from Harvard University and attended the Humboldt University of Berlin and the University of Leipzig in the German Empire from 1887 to 1890. He entered private practice in Chicago, Illinois, from 1890 to 1895. He was a Professor of Law for Northwestern University from 1895 to 1902. He was a Professor of Law for the University of Chicago from 1902 to 1911. He was a Judge of the Illinois Circuit Court for Cook County, Illinois, from 1904 to 1905. He was a Judge of the Illinois Appellate Court from 1905 to 1911.

== Social reform and charity ==
Mack was an active participant in many of the social reform movements which emerged in Chicago and the nation during the 1890s and early twentieth century. Mack worked at Hull House and taught social workers at the Chicago School of Civics and Philanthropy, and later became President of the National Conference of Charities and Correction. In 1904, he became President of the National Conference of Social Workers. He helped organize the Juvenile Protective League, forerunner of the Child Welfare League of America, and lobbied on behalf of protective legislation for minors and immigrant rights. He was an early supporter of the National Association for the Advancement of Colored People and the American Civil Liberties Union. He served as secretary of the United Jewish Charities, the association responsible for overseeing and funding Chicago Jewish philanthropic activities.

== Federal judicial service ==
Mack was nominated by President William Howard Taft on December 12, 1910, to the United States Commerce Court, the United States Court of Appeals for the Seventh Circuit and the United States Circuit Courts for the Seventh Circuit, to a new joint seat authorized by 36 Stat. 539. He was confirmed by the United States Senate on January 31, 1911, and received his commission the same day. On December 31, 1911, the Circuit Courts were abolished and he thereafter served on the Commerce Court and Court of Appeals. On December 13, 1913, the Commerce Court was abolished and he thereafter served only on the Court of Appeals. Mack was reassigned by operation of law to the United States Court of Appeals for the Sixth Circuit and the United States Court of Appeals for the Second Circuit on July 1, 1929, to a new joint seat authorized by 36 Stat. 539. On June 30, 1930, Mack was reassigned by operation of law to serve on the Second Circuit only, pursuant to the provisions of 36 Stat. 539. He assumed senior status on September 6, 1940. His service terminated on September 5, 1943, due to his death in New York City, New York.

=== Notable case ===
Mack presided over the Mail Fraud Case trial of Marcus Garvey in May 1923.

== Other service ==
Mack was a member of the United States War Department Board of Inquiry on Conscientious Objectors from 1918 to 1919.

== Other activities ==
Mack was President of the American Jewish Congress of 1918, the first American Jewish Congress. The permanent successor organization by the same name was founded in 1922.

== Honor ==
Kibbutz Ramat HaShofet, founded in Israel in 1941, was named in his honour.

== Personal ==
Mack was a member of Reform Judaism. His niece Eleanor married lawyer Max Lowenthal.

== See also ==
- List of Jewish American jurists
- List of United States federal judges by longevity of service

== Sources ==
- Who's Who on the Web, s.v. "Julian William Mack" (n.p.: Marquis Who's Who, 2005)
- 6th Circuit biography of Julian Mack
- Barnard, Harry (1974). The Forging of an American Jew: The Life and Times of Judge Julian W. Mack. New York: Herzl Press.
- Brinkmann, Tobias (2012). Sundays at Sinai: A Jewish Congregation in Chicago. Chicago: University of Chicago Press. ISBN 9780226074542.

Legal offices
Preceded by Seat established by 36 Stat. 539	Judge of the United States Commerce Court; 1911–1913	Succeeded by Seat abolished
Preceded by Seat established by 36 Stat. 539	Judge of the United States Circuit Courts for the Seventh Circuit; 1911	Succeeded by Seat abolished
Preceded by Seat established by 36 Stat. 539	Judge of the United States Court of Appeals for the Seventh Circuit; 1911–1929	Succeeded by Seat abolished
Preceded by Seat established by 36 Stat. 539	Judge of the United States Court of Appeals for the Sixth Circuit; 1929–1930	Succeeded by Seat abolished
Preceded by Seat established by 36 Stat. 539	Judge of the United States Court of Appeals for the Second Circuit; 1929–1940	Succeeded by Seat abolished
