= Messina (name) =

Messina is an Italian surname, originating from the city of Messina. Notable people with the surname include:

- Messina Brothers, English crime gang
- Alessandro Messina (born 1969), Italian economist
- Alessandro Messina (cyclist) (1941–2022), Canadian cyclist from the 1960 Summer Olympics
- Antonello da Messina (c.1430–1479), Sicilian Renaissance painter
- Cedric Messina (c.1920-1993), British television producer and director
- Charles Messina (born 1971), American playwright, screenwriter and director
- Chris Messina (born 1974), American actor and film director
- Chris Messina (open source advocate) (born 1981), American technology evangelist
- Daniele Messina (born 1992), Italian footballer
- David Messina (born 1974), Italian comics artist
- Domenico Messina (born 1962), Italian Football referee
- Ettore Messina (born 1959), Italian basketball coach
- Fabian Messina (born 2002), Dominican Republic footballer
- Francesco Messina (1900–1995), Italian sculptor
- Frank Messina (born 1968), American poet, author and performance artist
- Gaspare Messina (1879–1957), founder of the Patriarca crime family
- Geofforoy Messina (born 1982), French rugby union footballer
- Gerlandino Messina (born 1972), Sicilian Mafia member
- Gina Messina Dysert (born 1975), American activist
- Giuseppe Messina (born 1993), Italian footballer
- Guido Messina (1931–2020), Italian road bicycle and track cyclist
- Ignazio Messina (born 1964), Italian politician
- Jack Messina (born 2007), American actor
- Jim Messina (musician) (born 1947), American rock musician and producer
- Jim Messina (political staffer) (born 1969), American political adviser
- Jo Dee Messina (born 1970), American country music artist
- Joe Messina (1928–2022), American guitarist
- Leonardo Messina (born 1955), member of the Sicilian Mafia turned government informant
- Maria Messina (1887–1944), Italian writer
- Matteo Messina Denaro (1962-2023), Sicilian Mafia member and fugitive
- Michelangelo Messina, founder and artistic director of the Ischia Film Festival
- Sal Messina (born 1939), American ice hockey commentator
- Tony Messina, American chef
