= Tomaso Montanari =

Italian art historian, academic and essayist

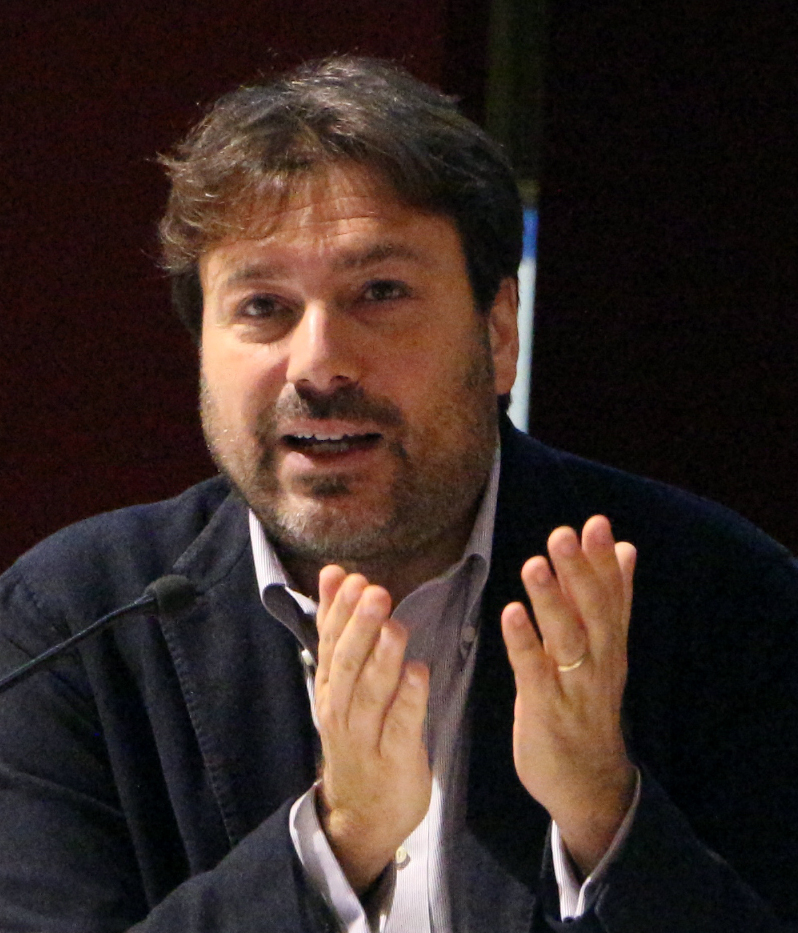
Montanari

Tomaso Montanari (born 15 October 1971) is an Italian art historian, academic and essayist.

== Life ==
He was born in Florence and there attended the liceo classico Dante, before graduating from the University of Pisa and studying alongside Paola Barocchi at the Scuola Normale Superiore di Pisa. He became ordinary professor of Modern Art History at the Università per Stranieri di Siena after teaching at the Università della Tuscia, the Università degli Studi di Roma Tor Vergata and the Università degli Studi di Napoli Federico II.

He is notable as one of the most authoritative authors on western Baroque art, on which he has written over one hundred essays in scholarly reviews and for noted publishers. He is president of the Comitato tecnico scientifico per le Belle Arti (technical scientific committee for fine arts) in Italy's Ministry of Cultural Heritage and Activities, and is thus also ex officio a member of the Consiglio Universitario Nazionale. He is also a member of the Uffizi's scientific committee, the editorial panel of the review Prospettiva and the jury for the Premio Sila.

He writes for the Il Fatto Quotidiano and the "Ora d'Arte" column for the Il Venerdì di Repubblica. He considers himself a "radical Catholic", influenced by the ideas of Lorenzo Milani.

== Journalism ==
=== Newspapers ===
- Corriere Fiorentino (until 2013);
- Corriere del Mezzogiorno (2013-2014);
- la Repubblica (2014-2018);
- HuffPost Italia (2015-2018);
- Il Fatto Quotidiano (dal 2018);

=== Magazines ===
- Il Venerdì di Repubblica (dal 2014);
- MicroMega (dal 2013);
- Altreconomia (dal 2016).

== TV ==
- La libertà di Bernini, 8 episodes aired from 7 January 2015 on Rai5, directed by Luca Criscenti
- La vera natura di Caravaggio, 12 episodes aired from 16 December 2016 in onda su Rai5, directed by Luca Criscenti
- I silenzi di Vermeer, 4 episodes aired from 21 dicembre 2018 on Rai5, directed by Luca Criscenti
- Favole forme figure, 12 ten-minute episodes on Italian masterpieces on the Loft slot on Il Fatto Quotidiano, from 29 October 2018
- Velázquez. L'ombra della vita, 4 episodes aired from 8 February 2019 on Rai5, directed by Luca Criscenti
- Eretici, ten episodes of biographies (Tina Anselmi, Hannah Arendt, Francesco Borromini, Piero Calamandrei, Danilo Dolci, Papa Francesco, Giorgio La Pira, Don Milani, Socrate, Paolo Veronese) on the Loft slot on Il Fatto Quotidiano, dal 28 febbraio 2019
- Gli abissi di Tiepolo, aired from 27 March 2020 on Rai5, directed by Luca Criscenti
