= Associative economics =

Associative economics refers to the conscious cooperation of various components of the economy, such as labor and management or consumers, producers, and distributors. The purpose of this co-operation would be to set priorities for what items should be produced and in what quantity, and how they should best be distributed. Further questions include the conditions and rights of workers, in particular their ability to be contributing agents to the development of the workplace. The goal of associative economics is to humanize economic relationships.

The idea and term originates in the work of the philosopher and social thinker Rudolf Steiner.

== Themes ==
Some of the themes central to/addressed by associative economics include the following:

- how the three ways money can move (through gift, loan, or purchase) play roles in the economy;
- the factors of production and price formation;
- alternatives to pure market forces for setting prices;
- real and personal credit;
- land rights residing in the commonweal;
- balance of payments,
- banking in an associative economy.

The principles of associative economics have inspired community supported agriculture, ethical banking, social finance, community land trusts, and local currencies.

== Local and global ==
Associative economics recognizes the central role of the individual entrepreneur and the inherent regulatory effect of face-to-face transactions between producers and consumers. At the same time, it sees that the economic organism has become truly global – has moved beyond national boundaries – so that when the economy is seen from a national perspective this is only partial and potentially harmful. Though within the context of a legislative and regulatory framework, the economy is best conducted not by the State but by those who are responsible for economic activities, potentially everyone working in association with one another rather than unto themselves. It has also been described as an "altruistic stakeholder-managed economy". This picture of an autonomously conducted economy belongs to Steiner's overall conception of the threefold nature of social life.

== The threefold nature of social life ==
In the early 20th century, Rudolf Steiner spoke in detail about the threefold nature of social life; not as an invention or theory, but as observable fact (also known as the "threefold social organism" or "social threefolding"). Central to this perception is the need for autonomy (separate yet conscious interaction) on the part of the three realms of social life: the economy, the rights life (including politics and law), and spiritual-cultural life, meaning the many worldviews that human beings cherish. Though historically premature, they see in the cry of the French Revolution ("Liberté, Égalité, Fraternité") three fundamental ideals of the modern human being, each of which can only find its proper place in one of these three spheres. Freedom and pluralism in the spiritual-cultural realm, including in education; uncoerced cooperation in the economic realm – where through the division of labor individuals come together to meet one another's needs; and democracy and equality in the political rights realm – where everyone comes together to sense and make agreements that are right for all.

== Land, labor and capital ==
Many things which today are considered commodities within the ‘free-market’ paradigm are differently understood within an associative paradigm. For example: land, labor, and capital. The so-called ‘factors of production’ are seen as 'factors of price formation', essentially matters of right which simply border the economic realm on all sides. However, in the associative paradigm, these 'factors of price formation' do not fall into the hands of the state.

Land is part of the commons. It is our common heritage, a resource that, in a wider sense, belongs to all (including future generations, but, again, not to the State), and which needs to be entrusted by voluntary groups and individuals to those whom such groups and individuals consider most capable of using it to meet current social needs.

Steiner views labor as a form of "wagery," the remnant of serfdom and slavery (where once we sold our whole body, now we sell our ’labor power’). But it is also an economic untruth, an impossibility which we allow to persist: "[People] actually speak as though a kind of sale and purchase took place between the wage-earner who sells his labour and the man who buys it from him. But this sale and purchase is fictitious. It does not in reality take place... [In reality] it is values which are exchanged. The worker produces something directly; he delivers a product, and it is this product which the enterpriser [Unternehmer] really buys from him. In actual fact, down to the last farthing, the enterpriser pays for the products which the workers deliver to him. It is time we began to see these things in their right light."

Capital creates value by the application of intelligence to labor. It is the human spirit manifest in the economic process. An interesting analysis of this viewpoint is provided by Folkert Wilken in his book The Liberation of Capital. Often taking the form of money, it further frees and empowers the entrepreneur to apply their intelligence. The artist Joseph Beuys famously expressed this as "Art=Capital" (Kunst=Kapital), or alternatively, for his art piece in the 'Luna Luna' art fair in 1987, "Money is not CAPITAL at all. CAPACITY is CAPITAL." Capital is therefore intimately linked to the individual, although it also owes much to our common heritage, especially the way we are educated.

In an associative economy, therefore, land, labor, and capital are understood as rights phenomena. Some interpret this to mean they are held in trust on behalf of the community (but not held by the state) and consequently managed by those with both the desire and capacity, but how precisely this idea is given practical expression is one of the key, and liveliest, areas of research in associative economics.

Land trusts, which remove land from the private market, but also keep it out of the hands of the state, have been developed for the protection of the environment and in order to make home ownership more accessible to low income people.

As for labor, many different kinds of efforts have been made to treat laborers not as a mere company expense or a mere factor of production, but as partners and associates in the business. That entails profit sharing, and a number of profound changes in the way workers are involved in companies.

As for capital, the associative idea broadly speaking is that the buildup of capital is a social phenomenon due to many more stakeholders than are acknowledged under traditional capitalism. As a social phenomenon, accumulations of capital by a company should be administered in a way that reflects social consideration among many stakeholders: Not just investors, but workers, the local and to some extent global community and environment, and independent educational institutions, are the sources of profits and profitable ideas and capital, and should have some share in the company and in its profits. An associative company would be set up so that it cannot be sold off by investors, since the company is not merely the creation of investors. But many different arrangements are possible.

One example is the Mondragon Corporation (started by Catholic priest José Mª Arizmendiarrieta, who was not associated with Rudolf Steiner, but whose economic views overlapped in important ways with Steiner's economic views). By the end of 2011, the Mondragon Corporation employed 83,869 people working in 256 companies in four areas of activity: finance, industry, retail and knowledge.

In an associative enterprise, distant investors, if allowed to invest at all, might not be given any voting rights, or the ability to take control of the company and sell it unilaterally without regard to other stakeholders. An emphasis might be placed on getting investment capital from a company's workers, who could be asked to invest part of their earnings or profits in a company investment fund to help expand the company and develop new offshoots. When a worker leaves the company, he withdraws his invested capital, plus its earnings and interest, and some sort of pension given enough years of service. The company is set up so that no one can amass company shares, and thus the company itself cannot be sold and remains a resource for the community, which after all has been a part of the company's success. The company, while for-profit, might be held in trust by a non-profit board, which ensures the company remains as a resource for the community. The broad guiding lines of associative economic enterprise are that economic life should not be owned or managed by the state (which however of course legislates and makes sure that laws and regulations are followed by companies, including basic rights for workers), nor should economic life be owned or managed merely by those who have lots of capital to invest; ownership should be spread among all the stakeholders, with an emphasis on those who work in a company, the local community, and independent schools. Management of the company should be determined not by the state, but by talent, know-how, and success: i.e., whoever can manage the company profitably and for the benefit of all stakeholders, might be selected in various ways by various stakeholders, depending on circumstances.
