= Alessandro Messina =

Alessandro Messina may refer to:

- Alessandro Messina (cyclist)
- Alessandro Messina (economist)
