= Global Alliance for Banking on Values =

Ethical banking association

Global Alliance for Banking on Values (GABV)
- Abbreviation: GABV
- Formation: 2009
- Type: Banking association
- Headquarters: Amsterdam, Netherlands
- Region served: Worldwide
- Members: 70 financial institutions (2024)
- Executive Director: Martin Rohner
- Website: www.gabv.org

The Global Alliance for Banking on Values (GABV) is an independent association of 'values-based banks' with a shared mission to use finance to deliver environmental, social, and corporate governance (ESG) positive outcomes. The GABV consists of over 70 member banks, credit unions and microfinance institutions. Its headquarters are in Amsterdam, Netherlands.

GABV's mission is to put finance at the service of people and the planet. These are banks that use money to deliver economic, social, and environmental development. They set themselves apart from traditional banks through their responsible approach to customers' money and lending practices. This includes providing loans and services to sustainable projects, individuals, and entrepreneurs, and avoiding investing in the pure financial and speculative economy, supporting their local communities and the environment, and maintaining ethical standards in how they treat staff and customers.

== History ==
The GABV was founded in 2009. Its founding members were Triodos Bank, ShoreBank, BRAC Bank, Mibanco Peru, Alternative Bank Switzerland, Merkur Bank, GLS Bank, Banca Popolare Etica, New Resource Bank and XacBank. In 2010, the company had its first annual meeting in Bangladesh.

The 2011 Lima Declaration demanded that value-based banks be recognised through appropriate regulation and not be adversely impacted by regulations intended to address issues related to mainstream banks.

2013 resulted in the first International Banking on Values Day, the creation of the Europe and North America regional chapters, as well as the Berlin Declaration.

In 2014, the GABV's scorecard, a set of common impact metrics, which allows banks to report their social impact of a bank through a harmonised method, was launched.

In 2016, the first Leadership Academy was launched, a program for senior professionals in values-based financial institutions. The program, in collaboration with MIT Colab and Presencing Institute, empowers changemakers to align financial leadership with social and environmental impact.

The ninth summit was held in Kathmandu, Nepal in 2017. This meeting concluded with the Kathmandu Declaration, a commitment to a long-term positive social impact towards renewing the whole banking system.

In November 2022, BRAC Bank hosted the group's 13th in-person summit, in Dhaka, Bangladesh.

The 15th anniversary annual meeting took place in Italy in 2024, where the Milan Declaration: A Statement for Peace was issued.

In March 2025, the GABV held its annual meeting in Uganda, hosted by Centenary Bank, one of the country's largest microfinance institutions. The event focused on the role of financial institutions in advancing economic empowerment in Africa and highlighted approaches to integrating sustainability into banking models in emerging markets.

== Activities ==
GABV coordinates initiatives among its member institutions to promote values-based banking. Its activities include leadership development programs such as the Leadership Academy and the Academy for Values-Based Governance, as well as communities of practice focused on areas including marketing, human development, and impact strategy. The alliance conducts research on the performance and resilience of values-based banks, including comparative studies with conventional banks and collaborations with organisations such as the European Investment Bank and Deloitte. It has developed the GABV Scorecard, a tool to assess alignment with the Principles of Values-Based Banking.

In climate finance, the GABV supports initiatives such as the Partnership for Carbon Accounting Financials (PCAF), and in 2024 several member banks endorsed the Fossil Fuel Non-Proliferation Treaty. The organisation has also engaged in policy advocacy, for example through the VALoRE project on sustainable finance regulation in the European Union. GABV issued the Milan Declaration: A Statement for Peace, calling for divestment from the arms industry. As of 2025, Martin Rohner serves as executive director of GABV.

== Principles ==
GABV members differ in business models, size, and areas of operation, but share six principles of values-based banking:

- A triple bottom line approach: placing people, planet and prosperity at the core of operations.
- Real economy: supporting productive enterprises, social businesses and community development.
- Client-centred: emphasising long-term relationships with clients, providing personalised services and understanding of their economic activities and the risks involved.
- Long-term resiliency: prioritising sustainable value and stability over short-term gains.
- Transparency: engaging with stakeholders, seeking their input and providing clear and timely information about their performance, transparency in governance and reporting.
- Culture: emphasising leadership practices, corporate culture, and organisational structures that reflect the principles of values-based banking, supported by human resources policies designed to promote employee development and well-being.

== Research and initiatives ==
Between 2011 and 2021 the GABV conducted comparative research between values-based banks and mainstream financial institutions. In 2019, it collaborated with the European Investment Bank, Deloitte and KKS Advisors on the report Do sustainable banks outperform?, which found that banks with strong environmental, social and governance (ESG) practices outperformed peers financially.

The GABV has supported international climate initiatives, including the Climate Change Commitment (3C) and the globalisation of the Partnership for Carbon Accounting Financials (PCAF), a standard methodology for assessing greenhouse gas emissions of financial portfolios.

In 2022, the alliance participated as an Observer NGO at COP27, continuing its engagement at COP28 and COP29, where 25 member banks endorsed the Fossil Fuel Non-Proliferation Treaty. Collectively, these banks manage US$117 billion in assets and finance over US$7 billion in clean energy projects.

In 2024, the GABV issued the Milan Declaration on peace and conflict finance, alongside the report Finance for War, Finance for Peace, highlighting values-based banks' exclusion policies on the arms industry.

In 2025 several members of the GABV, issued a position paper calling on the European legislator to clarify the definition of "controversial weapons" used in European Union (EU) sustainable finance regulation, and broaden it to protect investors, civilians, and sustainable finance integrity.

== Members ==
As of 2024, the GABV has 70 members and five supporting partners in 45 countries. Its membership includes banks, credit unions, cooperative lenders and microfinance organisations.

Notable members include:

- Alternative Bank Switzerland
- Amalgamated Bank
- Bank Australia
- Bank Muamalat Malaysia
- Beneficial State Bank
- BRAC Bank PLC
- Centenary Bank
- Cultura Sparebank
- Ecology Building Society
- ESAF Small Finance Bank
- GLS Bank
- Kindred Credit Union
- MagNet Bank
- National Cooperative Bank
- SDB bank
- Southern Bancorp
- Triodos Bank
- Unity Trust Bank
- Vancity
- Vdk bank
- Verity Credit Union

== See also ==
- Ethical banking
- Sustainable finance
- Impact investing
