= Rexroth =

Rexroth is a surname. Notable people with the surname:

- Alfred Rexroth (1899–1978), German engineer, entrepreneur and anthroposophist
- Andrée Rexroth (1902-1940)
- Dieter Rexroth (1941–2024), German musicologist, dramaturge and cultural manager.
- Kenneth Rexroth (1905–1982), American poet
- Natanael Rexroth-Berg (1879–1957), alias Natanael Berg, Swedish composer
- Matthias Rexroth (born 1970), German operatic countertenor

== See also ==
- Bosch Rexroth, German engineering firm based in Lohr am Main
