= Mercury Provident =

British ethical bank

Mercury Provident was the first British ethical bank, noted for its "Target Accounts" which allowed depositors to select a rate of interest and a field to invest in. It was founded in 1974 and merged with Triodos Bank in 1994.

== Principles ==
Mercury Provident was founded in 1974 by Christian Nunhofer and others. It was later constituted as a "licensed deposit-taking institution" under the Banking Act 1979. Inspired by the anthroposophical thinking of Rudolf Steiner, Mercury Provident aimed to raise awareness of the functions of money and financial lending in society. It offered loans to enterprises it judged to be of social and environmental value, for example Steiner schools, organic farms, wind farms and worker cooperatives. Enterprises supported included Henry Doubleday Research Association and Weleda UK.

== Investment accounts ==
Investors deposited money into "Target Accounts", which allowed them to choose projects they would like their deposit to support, and to select a fixed interest rate between zero and a maximum aligned with other market rates. Many investors also bought "membership shares", which were not traded on the Stock Exchange. In 1991 a variable-rate deposit account was introduced, offering a rate only slightly below base rate.

== Merger with Triodos ==
In 1994 Mercury Provident, which then had assets of about £9 million, was taken over by the larger ethical bank Triodos of the Netherlands. The decision was reported as due to an increased burden of regulatory requirements.
