= Alternative Bank Switzerland =

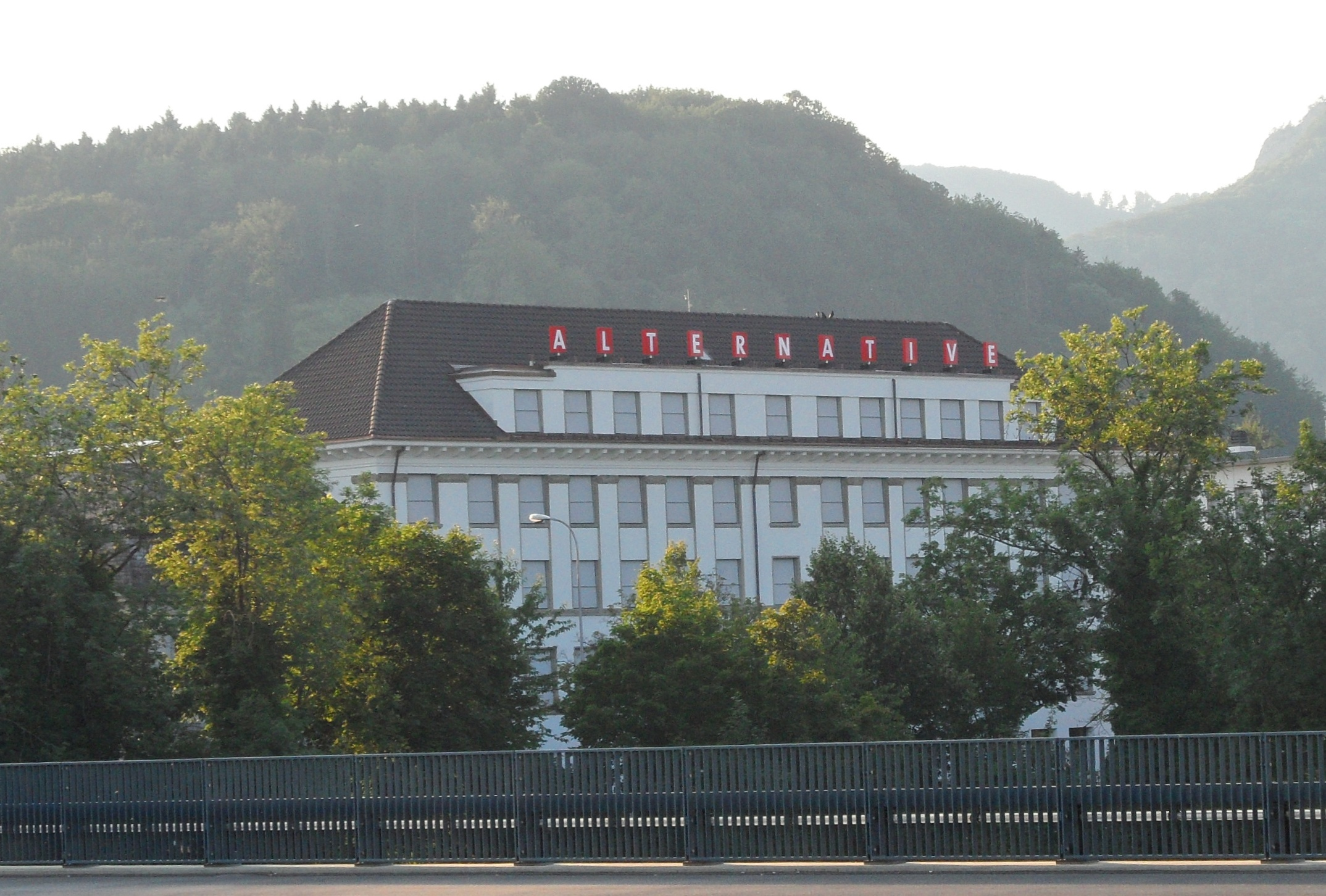
- Headquarters of the ABS in Olten, building of the former Walter Verlag.
- Native name: (in German) Alternative Bank Schweiz (in French) Banque alternative suisse (in Italian) Banca alternativa svizzera
- Type: Aktiengesellschaft
- Industry: Financial services
- Founded: 1990; 36 years ago
- Headquarters: Olten, Switzerland
- Number of locations: 3 branches
- Area served: Switzerland
- Key people: Chair of the Board of Directors: Marion Pester Members of the Executive Management: Bertrand Donninger, Daniel Hofer and Michaela Suter
- Products: Ethical and sustainable banking
- Services: Investments, loans, bank accounts
- Revenue: 1,586 million CHF (2014)
- Operating income: 7,1 million CHF (2014)
- Number of employees: 90 (2014)
- Website: www.abs.ch/en

Alternative Bank Switzerland (ABS) is a sustainability-oriented bank based in Olten, Canton of Solothurn, in Switzerland. Its headquarters are situated in the former building of the Walter Verlag.

== History ==
In March 2009, eleven ethical banks formed a global alliance to strengthen alternatives to the crisis-shaken conventional financial model. The new network was launched in the Netherlands, and ABS was a founding member of the Global Alliance for Banking on Values. The members also include Bangladesh (BRAC Bank), Peru (Mibanco), USA (ShoreBank Corporation), Germany (GLS Bank) and Mongolia (XacBank) comprising, as of 2009, about 12,000 million Swiss francs assets and seven million customers in 20 countries to form the Global Alliance. Its goals include solidar economic cooperation, long-term action and responsible income.

ABS offers to their customers a bank account to support microfinancing, the so-called Oikocredit-Förderkonto in co-operation with international partners. To provide this account, in November 2016 the Netherlands-based Oikocredit announced partnership with ABS. Oikocredit is thus financing partner organizations in over 70 developing and emerging countries. These, for example, grant small loans to women to build up self-employment or loans to small businesses. ABS jointly promotes sustainable development and guarantees the balances on the promotion account to the same extent as for a savings account.

By 2012, the balance sheet had grown by 10% to 1,120 million Swiss francs. The profit rose by 55% to nearly 6 million Swiss francs in 2012. 90 employees take care of around 33,224 customers as of 2014. Thus, in the national comparison the ABS is a small bank; in comparison, the Raiffeisen bank has a total assets of 15,500 million francs, 3.5 million customers and about 8,000 employees. 44% of the ABS management positions are staffed with women, which represents an extremely high rate in Switzerland.

== Weissgeldstrategie ==
One of the ABS strategies was called Weissgeldstrategie, literally meaning "white money strategy": All customers from Switzerland and from abroad must declare, that the money they bring to the ABS, is tax paid. For five years, the Alternative Bank Schweiz also reports interest income from non-Swiss assets unsolicited to the tax authorities of the home countries of the foreign clientele. Customers must give their consent, but if they do not comply, they cannot open an account at the ABS. In principle, this corresponds to the automatic exchange of information require more and more countries of the Switzerland to combat tax evasion.

== Negative interest rates ==
The ABS was the first bank in Switzerland that introduced negative interest rates for assets on the accounts of their retail banking customers: From 1 January 2016, they have to pay 0.125% on the ordinary accounts for private payments. The ABS responded to the introduction of negative interest rates by the Swiss National Bank and, since 1 April 2015, the ABS for the time being paid no more interest on all settlement accounts. Since end of January 2015, the Swiss banks have to pay on their deposits with the National Bank (SNB) an interest rate of 0.75%.

== Organization ==
The ABS is organized as an Aktiengesellschaft according to Swiss law. Originally, the founders planned to organize the bank as a cooperative, but the Swiss Financial Market Supervisory Authority did not allow to grant any new cooperative bank. In fact this legal disadvantage makes it thus easier for ABS to find new shareholders, because share holder value may easier to be sold to new owners as the planned cooperative shares. Therefore, the ABS could award a modest dividend.

== Literature ==
- Caspar Dohmen, Good Bank. Das Modell der GLS Bank, Orange Press, Freiburg, 2011.

== See also ==
- Ethical banking
- Global Alliance for Banking on Values
- Environmental, social, and governance
