= Alfred Rexroth =

German engineer and anthroposophist (1899–1978)

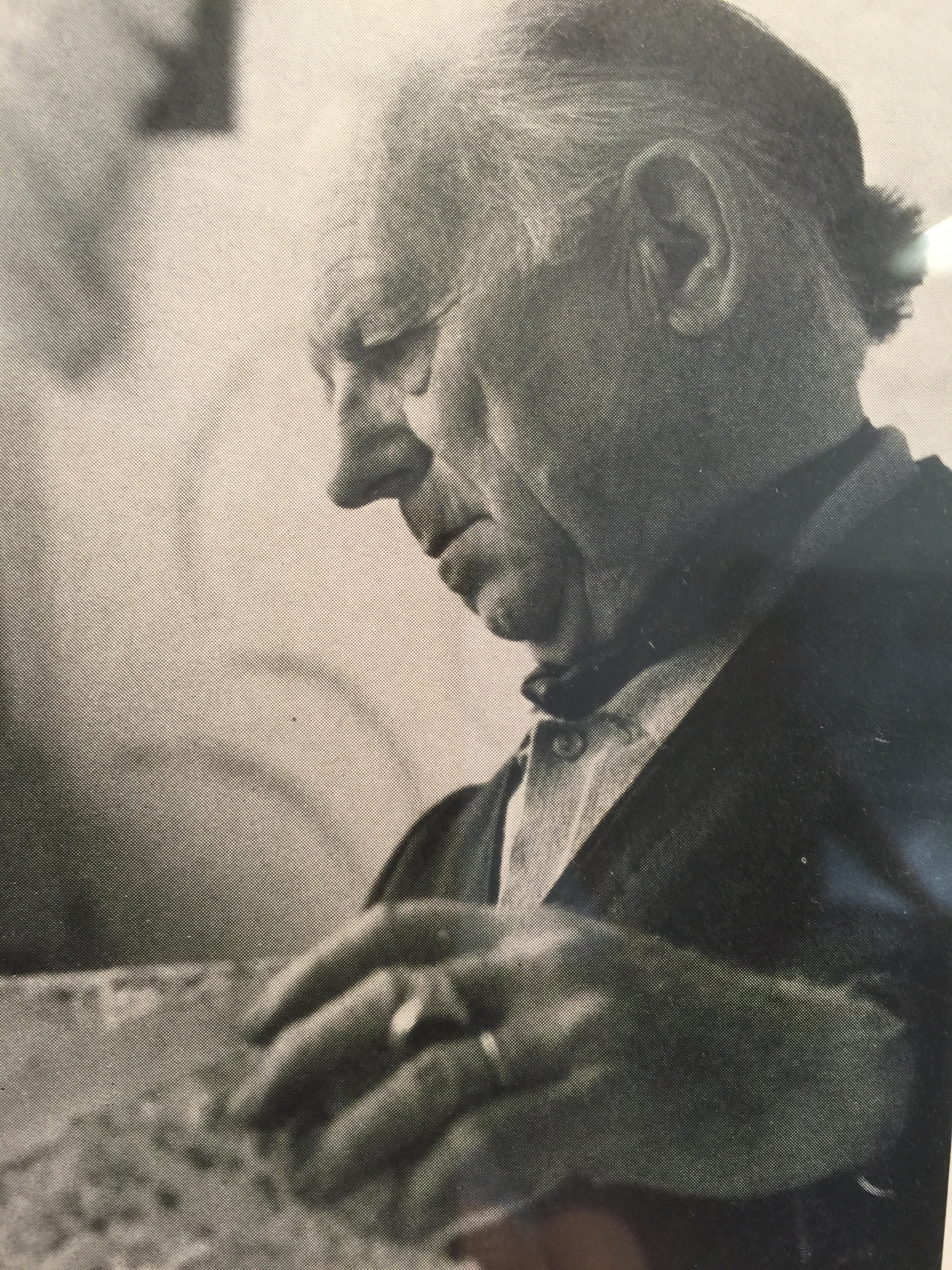
- Born: 27 March 1899; Lohr am Main, Bavaria, Germany
- Died: January 1978 (aged 78); Schloss Elmau, near Garmisch-Partenkirchen, Bavaria, Germany
- Occupations: Engineer, Entrepreneur, Anthroposophist
- Known for: Director of Neuguss, Rhinow, and family concern Rexroth
- Spouse: Friederike Schultz (née Fienemann)
- Children: 1 adopted daughter

Alfred Rexroth (27 March 1899 – January 1978) was a German engineer, entrepreneur and anthroposophist. He was the director of several business enterprises including the companies Neuguss, Rhinow and his family concern Rexroth, today Bosch Rexroth. Through the donation of his fortune the GLS Bank was able to begin much of its work.

== Life ==
Rexroth was born at Lohr am Main, Bavaria, on 27 March 1899. The oldest son of a family of manufacturers that had owned and run a steelworks in Spessart for four generations, he studied Engineering in Nürnberg. During this time he came in touch with Anthroposophy and heard his first lecture of Rudolf Steiner in 1921. After his internship with the company M.A.N. he travelled to Stuttgart where he worked in the office of the anthroposophical enterprise „Der Kommende Tag“ until entering the family business in 1923. He became a member of the Anthroposophical Society in 1925. In 1930 he married Friederike Schultz, né Fienemann and adopted her daughter from her first marriage.

Within the scope of the Gestapo clampdown on the Anthroposophists and anthroposophical institutions on 9 June 1941, Alfred Rexroth was interrogated, his house searched and his library with many anthroposophical books seized. He denied being a member of the Anthroposophical Society, explained the books as having belonged to the deceased first husband of his wife, and Friederike Rexroth in turn explained the presence of a further box of books in the attic as being stored there for want of space elsewhere. This appears in the report on the case of the Gendarmemerie post Lohr/Main of 12 July 1941. His ironworks, however, were soon thereafter seconded into the war effort, where his “passive resistance” caught the attention of the Gestapo and which they attributed to his anthroposophical convictions. The regional police in Würzburg directed a query to the Gestapo in Nürnberg regarding what should be undertaken against the brothers Alfred and Ludwig Rexroth in rescinding their managerial capacity. During the action against occult teachings, the connection of the couple Alfred Rexroth to Anthroposophy and to the Christian Community had been established.

“The lack of interest of the brothers Rexroth for efficient completion of products essential to the war effort in their company and the indifference in their company management were no doubt the result of their pacifist attitude.” This was noted in the report of the Gestapo headquarters, Nürnberg 6 November 1942. What action was taken in this regard has not been recorded.

Together with his brother and their administrative director, he led and built up the firm into a large international enterprise. Through improvements in the manufacture of hydraulic machinery the business was able to develop a homogeneous cast iron that could sustain high pressures.

Alfred Rexroth died at Schloss Elmau near Garmisch-Partenkirchen in Bavaria in January 1978.

== Business initiatives and innovation ==
Rexroth attempted, together with his brother Ludwig, to introduce corporate constitutions based on a principle of partnership. In the so-called "Heidenheimer Circle" he found other similarly thinking entrepreneurs that concerned themselves in their own way with the care and development of Rudolf Steiner’s ideas on Social threefolding. His chance of actually putting these into practice came somewhat later in the 1960s with the circle of people around Wilhelm Ernst Barkhoff. They were looking for legal frameworks and methods of financing on an anthroposophical basis. Here he saw an opportunity to take up once again the impulse of the „Kommende Tag“ and found new kinds of banking institutions. His engagement and active support contributed greatly towards broadening the scope of the legal and financial systems that we have today in the GLS Bank and the „Gemeinnützige Treuhandstelle“ (Charitable Trusteeship) – today the GLS Treuhand.

The different initiatives founded by Alfred Rexroth within the context of his business affairs most clearly demonstrate the impulses and ideals from which he worked.

=== Internships for scholars ===
At his foundry in Lohr Rexroth offered practical school goer’s internships to Waldorf schools from 1965 onwards. Hundreds of Waldorf students from the different high schools were able to experience a 3 – 4 week practical, the aim of which was to connect institutions of the cultural and spiritual spheres of society with that of a commercial enterprise and unfold in the young person social imagination through practical experience in the work place.

=== Foundation for Work Research ===
In 1974 Rexroth created a foundation for practical work research (Stiftung für Arbeitsforschung) with the aim of supporting research projects into how people and groups of people actively engaged in working life could initiate and test models of education, further education, training and work. In cooperation with the GLS Treuhand of the GLS Bank in Bochum and the Anthroposophical Society in Germany, many further education and training initiatives were supported, which worked with this aim in mind.

He therefore transferred his industrial shares to a Capital Administration Company of Trustees, who were bound also after his death, to ensure that the entrepreneurs involved in the business, and their descendants, could not gain private power over the capital of the enterprise. He stipulated that a portion of the profits from the industry would be given to the GLS Treuhand in Bochum and in this way support spiritual and cultural initiatives to this day.

=== Donation of his fortune ===
The company Rexroth in Lohr had grown to a leading concern in the hydraulics branch and stood before big investment decisions that exceeded the capacities of the enterprise. An investor with sufficient capital needed to be found and so the large corporation Mannesmann became involved. A limited partnership of the brothers Rexroth was transferred to Mannesmann. With the cooperation and help of his wife Friederike, Alfred Rexroth then transferred the proceeds of the sale against the payment of an annuity to the GLS Treuhand in Bochum. Many initiatives in Biodynamic agriculture, in education, special education and in further education and research were in the future financed from this large industrial fortune.

=== Associative Partnership ===
Finally, it was the intention of Rexroth to build up cooperative-associative collaboration in the place of anonymous market forces. As a basis for this, he set up a new company legal system in which all co-workers were given the status of equal partners in order to eliminate the polarity between Capital and Labour as well as between employer and employee. In this context we have the examples of the partnership contracts within the company Bosch Rexroth in Lohr and the part he played in the “Arbeitsgemeinschaft für Partnerschaft in der Wirtschaft” (AGP) (Association for Partnership in the Economy), of which he was one of the founding members. He wrote many articles and commentaries and held lectures and seminars in order to present the principle of solidarity or brotherliness in the economy.
