= Wilhelm Ernst Barkhoff =

German solicitor, banker, social reformer, & anthroposophist (1916–1994)

Wilhelm Ernst Barkhoff (26 June 1916 – 30 September 1994) was a German solicitor, founder of anthroposophically oriented alternative banking, the GLS Bank, reformer of the German welfare system and inspirer of the movement for Ethical banking.

== Biography ==
Born in Kamp-Lintfort, Germany, Wilhelm Ernst Barkhoff was the son of a miner in the German Ruhrgebiet, where he grew up. Already at an early age, through the constant unrest in this area, he developed an interest in social and political questions, but primarily also in philosophical and spiritual ideas and ideals. The concept of transubstantiation became one of his fundamental ideals, though he understood this not in its religious-ecclesiastic sense, but rather tried to realise it in social life, in financial and banking affairs, as also in agriculture and health care.

He studied law in Cologne, Freiburg and Berlin, where, after completing his first state examination, he was conscripted as an officer to do military service in World War II. On the Russian Front he was badly wounded by a grenade, leading to his first out-of-body experience, something that happened on further occasions during his flight on foot from Russia back to Germany.

During the war, he married Ottilie Grave from Bocholt. Their first son was born in 1945, had Down syndrome and lived for only eleven months. Later, the couple had three more sons and a daughter. After the war, on completing his articles in 1948, he became a solicitor, founding and running one of the leading law firms in Bochum. He and his wife cultivated close friendships with the artists of the Bochum Art Association.

In 1956, he joined the governing board of the Rudolf Steiner School Ruhrgebiet, which was looking for a legal counsellor. The school was started contrary to the ban on founding further Waldorf schools which the Bund der Freien Waldorfschulen, the German Waldorf School Federation, had attempted to impose at the time. With it began the public life of anthroposophy in the Ruhrgebiet. It was to have more students than any other Waldorf school worldwide. Amongst other things, the teacher training college, Institut für Waldorfpädagogik, was one of the initiatives it generated. In order to finance this school, Barkhoff invented the “borrowing community”, a system of solidarity, where the combining of individual financial resources enabled persons of otherwise modest financial means to gain access to substantial bank loans. With this, the basis of anthroposophical banking was born. Through his work on the board of the school, he met his future anthroposophical co-workers: Gisela Reuther, Klaus Fintelmann, Klaus Dumke, Franz Schily, Ernst Neuhöfer, Lore Schäfer, Robert Zimmermann and Wilhelm Wollborn. Gisela Reuther joined her own tax consultancy with his law offices. Through this collaboration within the credit guarantee communities, the anthroposophical banks began their work.

The development of these instruments of funding, as well as his talent for bringing people to work together, brought him into contact with Special Needs Education, particularly close work with Karl König and the Camphill Movement as well as the Wuppertal initiatives around Siegfried Schmock.

He soon became involved in financially securing and spreading the work of biodynamic agriculture In order to save them from the destructive hereditary division they were subject to, he invented the Non-profit Agricultural Research Company (Gemeinnützigen Landbauforschungsgesellschaften) as the holding company of the farm. He tied credit worthiness to their willingness to be “more” than simply a farming business, rather striving towards the inclusion of people with special needs, child or adult education, landscape and community development. Barkhoff wanted to create instruments for new types of human communities in order to replace the ties of blood relationships that had for many centuries determined and carried agriculture. He advised Manfred Klett and his co-workers in the establishment of the Dottenfelderhof, a rural community working to a high professional and human standard. Forming a company out of the Bauck-Höfe belonging to Nicolaus Remer and Joachim Bauck of the Bauck family, that continued to work the farm, was a more traditional version. After some time, around a hundred such organisations were established.

As banking organisations the Gemeinnützige Treuhandstelle (Charitable Trustee Agency) was founded in Hamburg in 1961, the Gemeinnützige Kreditgarantie Genossenschaft (Charitable Credit Guarantee Cooperative) in 1967 and finally the GLS Gemeinschaftsbank (GLS Community Bank) in Bochum in 1974. From 1968 onwards, Rolf Kerler joined the Barkhoff/Reuther team. Meetings with the Heidenheimer Kreis (Heidenheim Circle), a group of industrialists around Hanns Voith and Peter von Siemens dedicated to cultivating the social impulses of Rudolf Steiner, led to a co-work with the industrialist Alfred Rexroth, whose substantial donations went a long way towards securing and realising the banking initiatives.

Besides his activities within the anthroposophical scene, Barkhoff began his work with the German welfare organisations during the early 60’s. In 1961 he became chairman of the Nordrhein-Westfalen branch of the Deutscher Paritätischer Wohlfahrtsverbandes (German Parity Welfare Association). At the time the Association led a kind of clandestine existence behind the state Red Cross and the confessional and political associations (Caritas, Innere Mission, Arbeiterwohlfahrt). Welfare was seen to be an affair of Church and State. Free and independent welfare was permitted to exist; initiatives and foundations that arose out of individual impulses, however, were not seen to embody the image one had of a charitable society. Today the situation has changed and they are recognised. It was Wilhelm Ernst Barkhoff who was the initiator and moderator of this development. Under his leadership the regional branch of the Association grew to five times its size.

This unprecedented growth in membership was due to the Welfare Association’s involvement with the movement for the emancipation of parents of children with special needs, with student the women’s rights as also various self-help groups of a more medical nature, initiatives of the unemployed and recipients of social benefits. As a member of the national executive he represented the viewpoint at the various strategy conferences that the greatest force binding together social life arises precisely through the faith in the individual human being; that an association, which has the courage to fully entertain the competing views of its members on a conceptual and spiritual basis is not weakened but grows stronger than any ties of a common world view can provide. Through Barkhoff, the Parity Welfare Association opened itself to the transforming societal energy of the 1968 movement, which gave it a sphere of activity and new challenges. He also established a new financing instrument for the Parity Welfare Association, the Parity Financial Counseling Paritätische Geldberatung.

In 1981, Wilhelm Ernst Barkhoff retired from all his business involvements, continuing to serve only as speaker, impulsator and counsellor. He travelled a great deal internationally during this time, particularly to North and South America, and was regularly invited to appear in Scandinavia.

== Publications ==
- Das gefährdete Ich. Der Mensch in der Krise des Erkennens Hans Börnsen, Wilhelm Ernst Barkhoff, Gerhard Kienle Freies Geistesleben GmbH (November 1983) ISBN 978-3-7725-0725-0
- Die Rudolf Steiner Schule Ruhrgebiet Sönke Bai, Wilhelm Ernst Barkhoff, Michael Bockemühl, Rowohlt TB-V., Rnb. March 1990, ISBN 3499169851 ISBN 978-3499169854
- Sozial handeln, aus der Erkenntnis des sozial Ganzen Soziale Dreigliederung heute Reinhard Giese (Editor), Stefan Leber, Wilhelm Schmundt, Peter Schilinski, Wilhelm Ernst Barkhoff, Gerald Häfner, Reinhard Engelen, Hans Georg Schweppenhäuser Verlag Reinharf Giese ASIN B002FDGDHY
