= New Resource Bank =

- Type: Subsidiary
- Industry: Banking; Financial services
- Headquarters: San Francisco, California
- Parent: Amalgamated Bank
- Website: newresourcebank.com

New Resource Bank is a San Francisco, California-based bank which is a part of Amalgamated Bank.

The bank is insured by the Federal Deposit Insurance Corporation and offers commercial loan and deposit products, specializing in renewable and alternative energy, green building, organic food, and green products and services. It also offers personal banking accounts.

New Resource's lending decisions factor in a sustainability measurement. The bank's goal is a loan portfolio invested 100 percent in businesses that are advancing sustainability. All new loan recipients must be green businesses or committed to improving their operational sustainability and managing their impact on society and the environment.

New Resource is a founding member of the Global Alliance for Banking on Values, a Green America certified business, and a San Francisco certified Green Business.

Vince Siciliano, the current CEO of New Resource Bank, is also an advisory board member of the American Sustainable Business Council.

== History ==
New Resource Bank was founded in 2006. The bank opened with 240 founding shareholders, including Triodos Bank and RSF Social Finance. It now has about 360 shareholders; major shareholders include the Generation IM Climate Solutions Fund, Triodos and RSF.

In 2010 New Resource became a B Corporation. B Corporations meet comprehensive social and environmental performance standards. New Resource Bank, which has been traded publicly in the over-the-counter market since its early days, was the first publicly traded company to become a certified B corporation. After the merger with Amalgamated Bank in May 2018, which is not a public company, New Resource Bank was no longer publicly traded.

During the Occupy Wall Street movement in 2011 a number of financial institutions including New Resource Bank sought to draw customers from more traditional financial institutions.

In May 2018 New Resource completed a merger with Amalgamated Bank.
