= National Council of University Students (Italy) =

- Consiglio Nazionale degli Studenti Universitari; CNSU
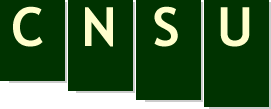
- CNSU's Logo

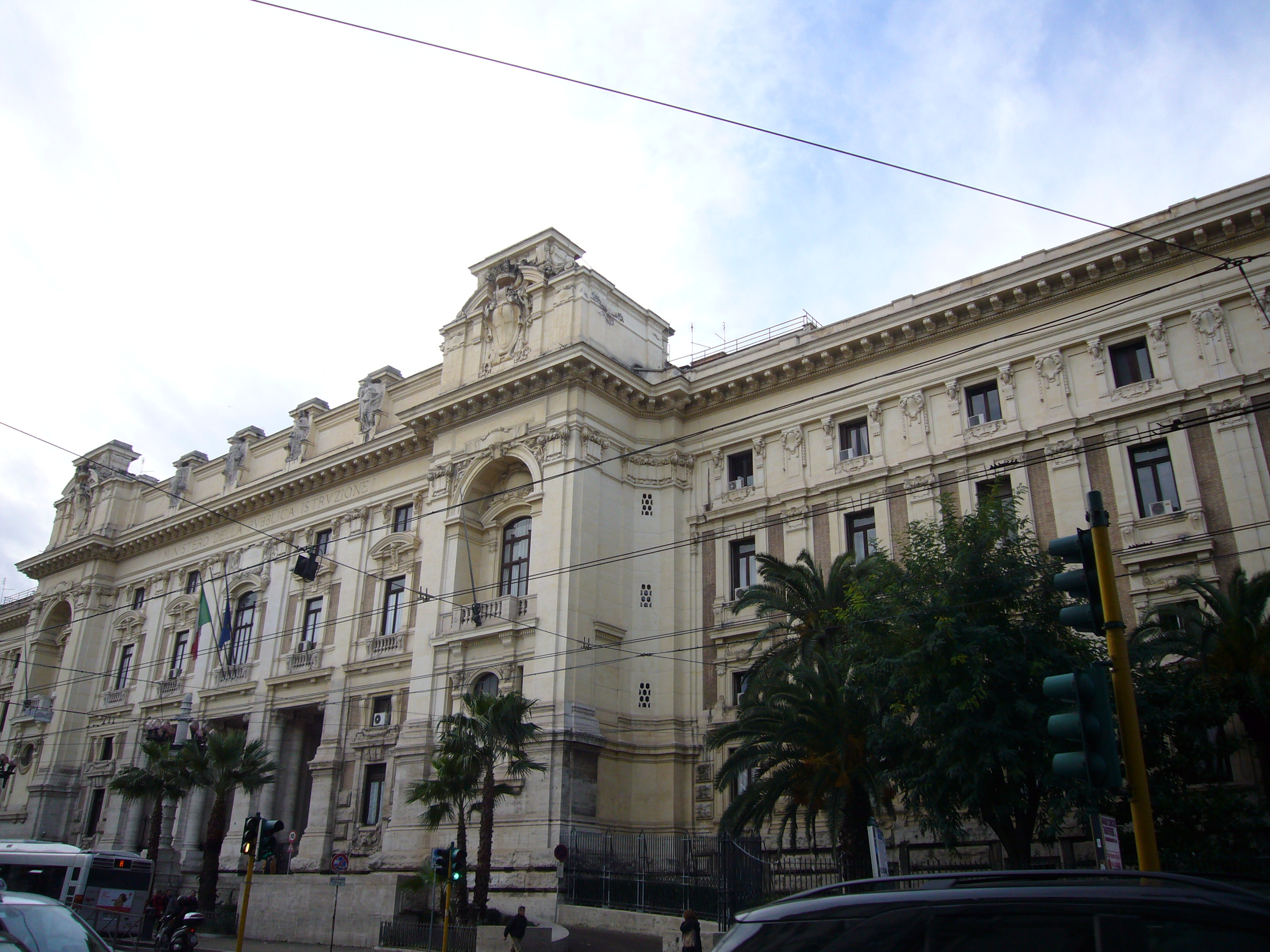
- Ministry building, viale Trastevere.

Agency overview
- Formed: 1997
- Jurisdiction: Government of Italy
- Headquarters: Via Michele Carcani, 61; 00153 Rome
- Website: www.cnsu.miur.it

The National Council of University Students (in Italian: Consiglio Nazionale degli Studenti Universitari or CNSU) is an advisory body of the Ministry of Education, University and Research (Italy) (in Italian: Ministero dell'Istruzione, dell'Università e della Ricerca) of the Italian Republic. Provided for by law no. 59 15 March 1997., was actually established with the Presidential Decree 2 December 1997, n. 491.

The current President is Luigi Leone Chiapparino of the UDU, a student of the University of Perugia (Central District). The role of Vice President is currently held by Daniele Tagliacozzo, a student of the Roma Tre University (Central District), di it:Primavera degli Studenti.

== Structure ==
It is composed of 30 members, 28 of them representing students enrolled in bachelor's and master's courses, 1 representing PhD students and 1 representing students enrolled in specialization courses. The entire Italian territory is divided up into four electoral districts and each one hosts the election of 7 representatives.

Elections of members take place every three years and are confirmed by decree of the Italian Minister of University and Research. Members can be re-elected.

== Role ==
The Council can formulate opinions and proposals to the Italian Minister of University and Research concerning the university world (implementation of reforms, Right to education, funding, news of national importance concerning national universities).

In particular, as written in the Presidential Decree 2 December 1997, n. 491:

- on the reorganization projects of the university system prepared by the Minister;
- on ministerial decrees, which define the general criteria for regulating the teaching systems of university study courses, as well as the methods and tools for orientation and to encourage student mobility;
- on the criteria for assigning and using the ordinary funding fund (in Italian: it:Fondo di finanziamento ordinario) and the university rebalancing quota;
- elects eight student representatives to the Consiglio Universitario Nazionale from among its members, and also appoints three members to the advisory committee of the National Agency for the Evaluation of the University and Research System and of the ANDISU (in Italian: it:National Association of Bodies for the Right to University Education);
- can make proposals and can be heard by the Minister on other matters of general interest to the university;
- submits to the minister, within one year of taking office, a report on the student status within the university system;
- he can address questions to the minister about facts or events of national importance regarding teaching and the student condition, which will be answered within 60 days.
- The Board elects its own president, a vice president and four members who make up the presidency office.

== Elections' Results ==
Up to now seven national elections have been held, every 3 years: 2019; 2016; 2013; 2010; 2007 and 2004, with the first one held in 2000

== Sources ==
This article originated as a partial translation of this version of it:Consiglio Nazionale degli Studenti Universitari, its counterpart in the Italian Wikipedia.

== See also ==
- ANVUR
- Consiglio Universitario Nazionale
- Ministry of Education, University and Research (Italy)
