= Alessandro Messina (economist) =

Italian economist and manager

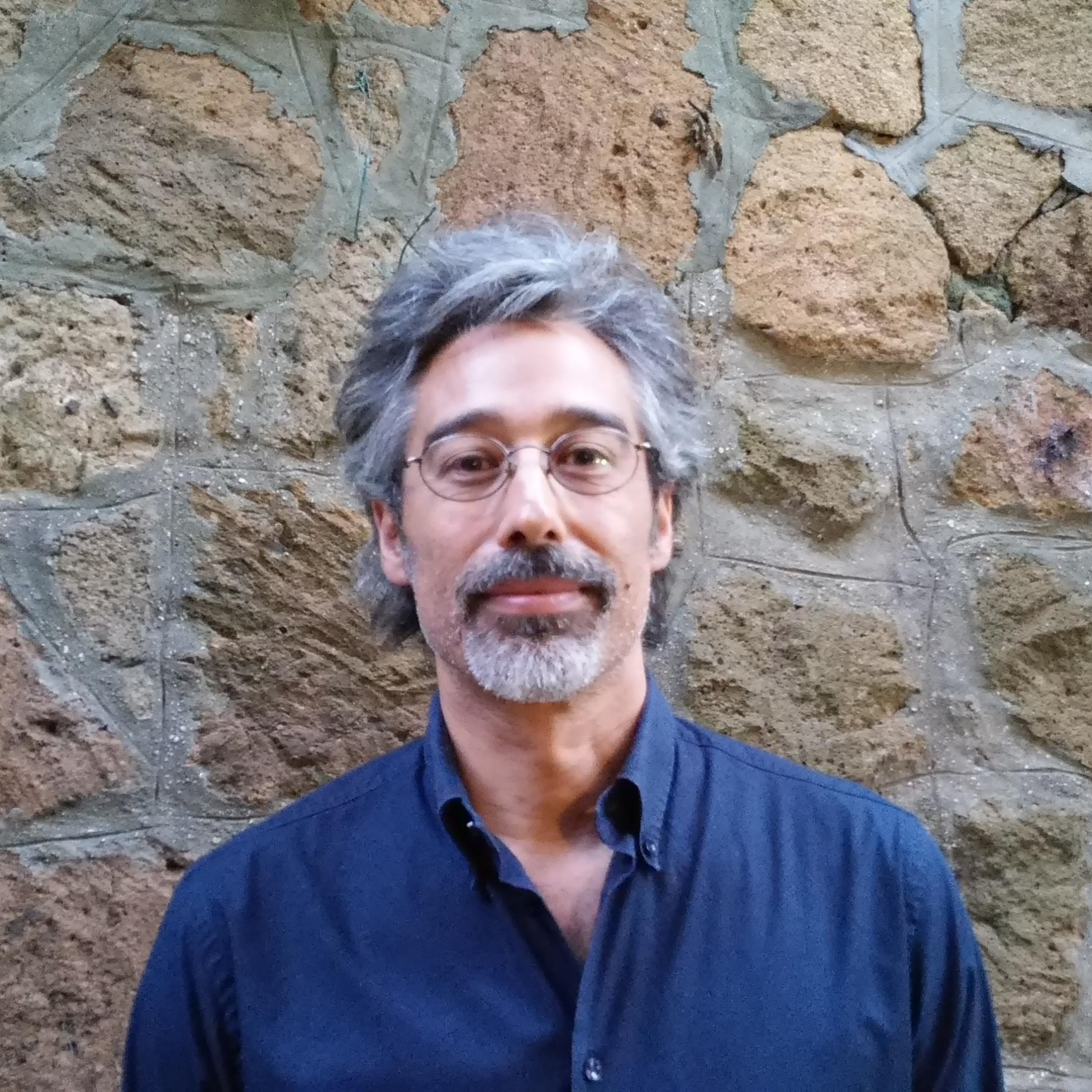
- Born: 1969 (age 56–57)
- Occupations: Economist, Manager
- Known for: Nonprofit organizations, Ethical banking, Local development
- Notable work: Handbook on Non-Profit Institutions in the System of National Accounts (contributor)

Alessandro Messina (born 1969) is an Italian economist and manager. His main fields of interest are nonprofit organizations, ethical banking and local development.

== Career ==
Part of the Italian team, as a Researcher at ISTAT, the Italian National Institute of Statistics, he contributed to the Handbook on Non-Profit Institutions in the System of National Accounts, edited by the United Nations, New York (2003).

During his research activity at ISTAT, Messina co-authored a paper with Susanna Riccioni on the economic measurement of nonprofit institutions, presented at the 15th Voorburg Group Meeting on Service Statistics in 2000. In 2008, he contributed a chapter on the Italian third sector to Lessons from Abroad, a comparative volume published by the British Association of Chief Executives of Voluntary Organisations (ACEVO).

In 2006, the City of Rome's Autopromozione Sociale programme, managed by Alessandro Messina, won the European Enterprise Award for Responsible Entrepreneurship.

He has been in charge of the Credit Department for the Italian Banking Association (ABI - Associazione bancaria italiana) and for the Italian Association of Cooperative Banks.

In 2014, Alessandro Messina served as one of the rapporteurs of the Capital Attraction working group of the Italian Advisory Board to the G8 Social Impact Investment Taskforce.

From June 2015 to October 2021, Messina served as Director General of Banca Etica, an Italian cooperative bank specializing in ethical banking and sustainable finance in Italy, member of the Global Alliance for Banking on Values and of FEBEA, the European Federation of Ethical and Alternative Banks.

He has been a board member of several entities, including Satispay, Alternative Capital Partners Sgr, Atlas Sgr (where he was CEO from 2023 to 2025) and Altreconomia. On 28 June 2022, Messina was appointed Vice-Chairman of CAES (Consorzio Assicurativo Etico Solidale), an Italian ethical insurance consortium.

Alessandro Messina is currently Head of Impact Finance at Avanzi Spa Benefit Corporation, a sustainability consultancy.

== Essential bibliography ==
- La finanza sociale. Come usare il denaro per la collettività, Altreconomia, 2026.
- Money For Nothing. Guida civica alla finanza per comprendere, discutere, scegliere, Altreconomia, 2023.
- Manager cooperativi. Un manuale per gestire imprese controcorrente, in equilibrio tra etica e business, Altreconomia, 2022.
- Fare il microcredito. Manuale per l'operatore, Bancaria editrice, 2015.
- Servire lo Stato. Il mestiere del bravo burocrate, Edizioni dell'asino, 2009.
- Messina, Alessandro (2008). "Growing Pains: The Italian Third Sector". In Filippo Addarii, Catherine Deakin and Seb Elsworth (eds.), Lessons from Abroad: The Third Sector's Role in Public Service Transformation. London: ACEVO, pp. 35–50. ISBN 1-900685-51-5.
- La finanza utile, with Paolo Andruccioli, Carocci, 2007.
- La respuesta de las finanzas eticas en el mundo, with Cinzia Cimini, in Finanzas Y Economia Social, with contributions by Joseph Stiglitz and Muhammad Yunus, Editorial Altamira, 2005.
- Denaro senza lucro. Manuale di gestione finanziaria per il terzo settore, editor and author, Carocci, 2003.
- Italy. New welfare, new gaps, in The Social Impact of Globalisation in the World, Social Watch Report 2002.
- Messina, Alessandro; Riccioni, Susanna (2000). The Economic Account of Nonprofit Institutions Serving Households: Towards the Construction of a Satellite Account of the Nonprofit Sector in Italy. Working paper (draft), 15th Voorburg Group Meeting on Service Statistics, Madrid, 18–22 September 2000.
- Lavorare bene. Manuale sull'organizzazione e le forme di lavoro nel terzo settore, with a preface by Serge Latouche, Edizioni Lavoro, 1999.
