= Oikocredit =

Cooperative society offering financial options for enterprises in developing countries

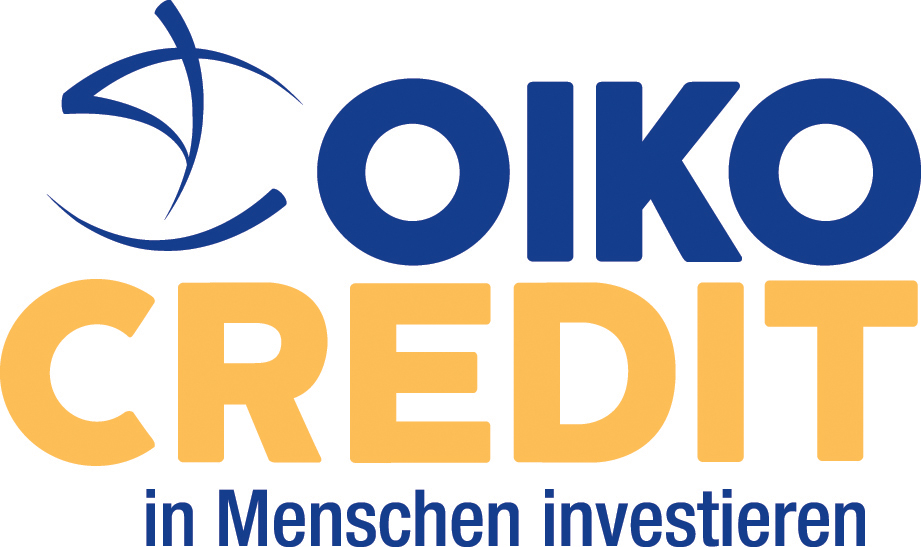
Oikocredit-Logo

Oikocredit (in full Oikocredit, Ecumenical Development Cooperative Society U.A.) is a cooperative society that offers loans or investment capital for microfinance institutions, cooperatives and small and medium-sized enterprises in developing countries. It is one of the world's largest private financiers of the microfinance sector. The idea for Oikocredit came from a 1968 meeting of the World Council of Churches. Following this, Oikocredit was established in 1975 in the Netherlands.

As a co-operative, Oikocredit finances and invests in fair trade organisations, co-operatives, microfinance institutions, and small to medium-sized enterprises in many developing countries. In 2016 Oikocredit had offices in 31 countries.

On 25 March 2010, Oikocredit announced that it had reached €1 billion in cumulative committed loans and investments since the organisation began its operations. In 2009, a year when financial institutions encountered difficult market conditions, Oikocredit achieved record high inflows: Oikocredit's capital inflow reached €62.9 million and its total assets grew by 13% to €537 million at the year end.

Oikocredit’s financial resources primarily derive from investments (£150 minimum, no maximum) contributed by 54,000 individuals, institutions and faith-based organisations worldwide. In return, investors have received stable gross dividends paid (or re-invested) annually since 2000 with no fixed notice period, together with annual social performance reports that monitor the impact of Oikocredit and their partner organisations in developing countries.

As of 2014, Oikocredit channeled €40.3m (£31.7m) of its investment capital into 85 fair trade partner organisations, many in coffee and cocoa enterprises in Latin America and Africa. In the same year Oikocredit launched an agriculture unit led from Lima, Peru. The cooperative also diversified into renewable energy, recruiting a renewable energy financing expert, to source deals in low-income countries.

On 16 November 2016, Alternative Bank Schweiz (ABS) launched a banking partnership with Oikocredit.

== Etymology ==
"Oiko" is derived from the Greek word "οἶκος" or "oikos", meaning "the house, the place where the people live together", which is also the root of the word, "economy".

== Criticism ==
There are allegations that Oikocredit has failed to conduct adequate due diligence on its investments in Cambodia’s microfinance sector since at least 2017, despite evidence of harms directly linked to those investments. Cambodian League for the Promotion and Defense of Human Rights (LICADHO), Equitable Cambodia (EC) and FIAN Germany filed a complaint against Oikocredit at NCP Netherlands. In response Oikocredit said, that they had not identified any forced land sales and that customer protection is their top priority.
