= Kindred Credit Union =

Canadian credit union

- Formerly: Waterloo County Mennonite Credit Union
- Type: Credit union
- Industry: Financial services
- Headquarters: Kitchener, Ontario, Canada
- Key people: Jason Daly (CEO)
- Number of employees: 200+
- Website: kindredcu.com

Kindred Credit Union is a member-owned financial cooperative based in Ontario, Canada. Headquartered in Kitchener, the cooperative operates eight branches across Southern Ontario and is the province's 12th largest credit union.

== History and structure ==
Originally called the Waterloo County Mennonite Credit Union, it had two name changes prior to being renamed Kindred Credit Union in 2016. The name change was done to appeal to a broader range of prospective clients. The credit union had already previously extended its membership eligibility beyond Mennonites, Amish, and Be in Christ church members in 2010.

As of September 2024, Jason Daly is Kindred’s CEO. Jason was preceded by Ian Thomas from 2019 to 2023 and Brent Zorgdrager from 2010 to 2018.

The cooperative is a member of the Global Alliance for Banking on Values. Since December 2016, they are Certified B Corporation. Kindred also is a Certified Living Wage Employer, part of the Ontario Living Wage Network.

As a "faith-inspired" financial cooperative, the credit union strictly limits investments in alcohol, tobacco, cannabis, gambling, military and weapons, as well as other areas that have negative impacts on human rights, employees, and animal welfare. Focusing on socially responsible investments is a key component of their financial strategy in combining mutual aid put into faithful practice.

== Awards ==
As a Certified B Corporation, Kindred Credit Union has been on the "Best For The World" annual list since 2017, ranking within the top 5% in their corresponding size group of all B Corporation members. For the past three years, they have consistently ranked Best For the World: Customers, including 2022.

The credit union was also a Platinum Winner for Aon's Canada's Best Employers in 2019, scoring among the top 25% of all companies surveyed.
