= Amalgamated Bank =

American financial institution

Amalgamated Financial Corp.
- Type: Public
- Traded as: Nasdaq: AMAL; Russell 2000 Index component
- Industry: Banking
- Founded: April 14, 1923; 103 years ago
- Headquarters: 275 Seventh Avenue, New York City, New York, U.S.
- Key people: Priscilla Sims Brown (president & CEO)
- Revenue: ▲$293.371 million (2023)
- Net income: ▲$90.459 million (2023)
- Total assets: ▲$7.97 billion (2023)
- Owner: Workers United Related Parties (40.96%)
- Number of employees: ▲425 (2023)
- Subsidiaries: New Resource Bank
- Website: amalgamatedbank.com

Amalgamated Bank is an American financial institution. It is the largest union-owned bank and one of the only unionized banks in the United States. Amalgamated Bank is currently majority-owned by Workers United, an SEIU Affiliate.

It was founded on April 14, 1923, by the Amalgamated Clothing Workers of America. As of July 30, 2023, Amalgamated Bank had $7.8 billion in assets. Through its Institutional Asset Management and Custody Division, Amalgamated Bank is one of the leading providers of investment and trust services to Taft–Hartley plans in the United States. The bank oversees over $45 billion in investment advisory and custodial services.

In August 2018, Amalgamated Bank filed an initial public offering and became publicly traded on the NASDAQ, under the ticker symbol "AMAL".

The bank offers personal banking, small business banking solutions, commercial banking, and institutional investing services across New York, California, Massachusetts, Washington, D.C., and Colorado.

== History ==
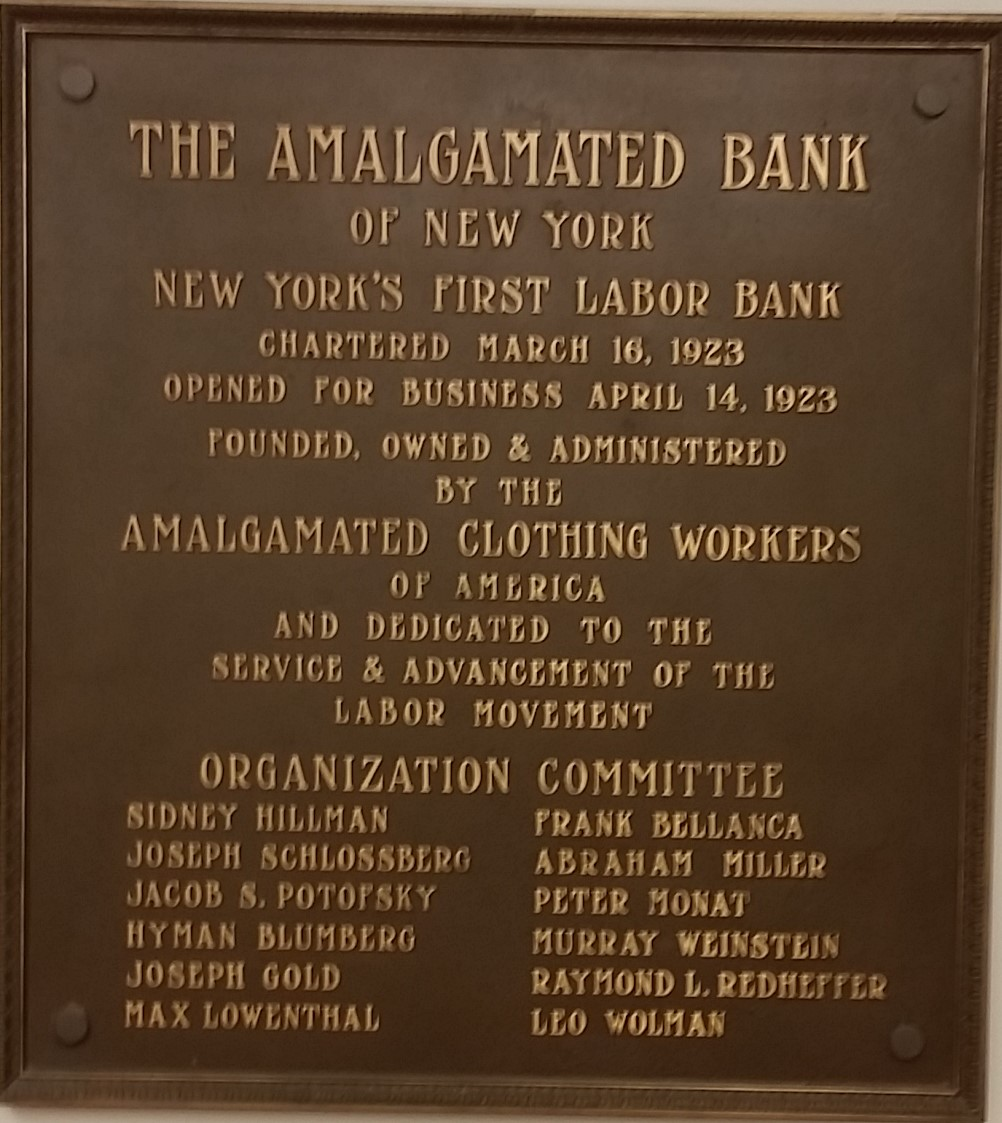
Plaque in the Lobby of the Bank's Corp HQ

On March 16, 1923, the Amalgamated Clothing Workers of America chartered the Amalgamated Bank of New York. On April 14, 1923, the bank opened its doors to the public on East 14th Street, Manhattan, next door to a former site of Tiffany's on Union Square. Within a short time, 2,400 people had deposited $450,000 with the bank. Within weeks, it had to expand vertically onto two floors above in the same building. In the Liberator magazine, the bank advertised its ownership and operations by the Amalgamated Clothing Workers. It listed chairman Hyman Blumberg, president R. L. Redheffer, vice president Jacob S. Potofsky, cashier Leroy Peterson, and other directors: Gold, Sidney Hillman, Max Lowenthal, August Bellanca, Fiorello H. La Guardia, Abraham Miller, Joseph Schlossberg, Murray Weinstein, Max Zaritsky, and Peter Monat.

In 1927, Amalgamated Bank financed the Amalgamated Housing Cooperative, the first union-supported housing development in the United States, which is located in The Bronx. In the late 1920s, Amalgamated Bank had a "Travel Department" that advertised "Visit Soviet Russia" in New Masses magazine. In 1957, it financed the construction of Park Reservoir Housing Cooperative in the Bronx, which was the first affordable housing development created under New York State's Mitchell-Lama Housing Program. Amalgamated has a long history of helping union movements. It once opened its bank vaults on a Saturday to provide $300,000 in bail for striking workers. The National Association for the Advancement of Colored People (NAACP) received $800,000 to post a cash bond within 24 hours. In 1973, bank employees worked all weekend to keep striking Philadelphia teachers out of jail. In 1982, Amalgamated made a $200,000 loan to the striking National Football League Players Association even though they did not even have an account at the bank.

In May 2018, the Amalgamated Bank merged with New Resource Bank of San Francisco.

In August 2018, Amalgamated became a public company and filed for an initial public offering of stock to trade on the Nasdaq Global Market under the ticker symbol "AMAL."

In March 2021, the bank became the first publicly traded financial services company to be a public benefit corporation.

== Products and services ==
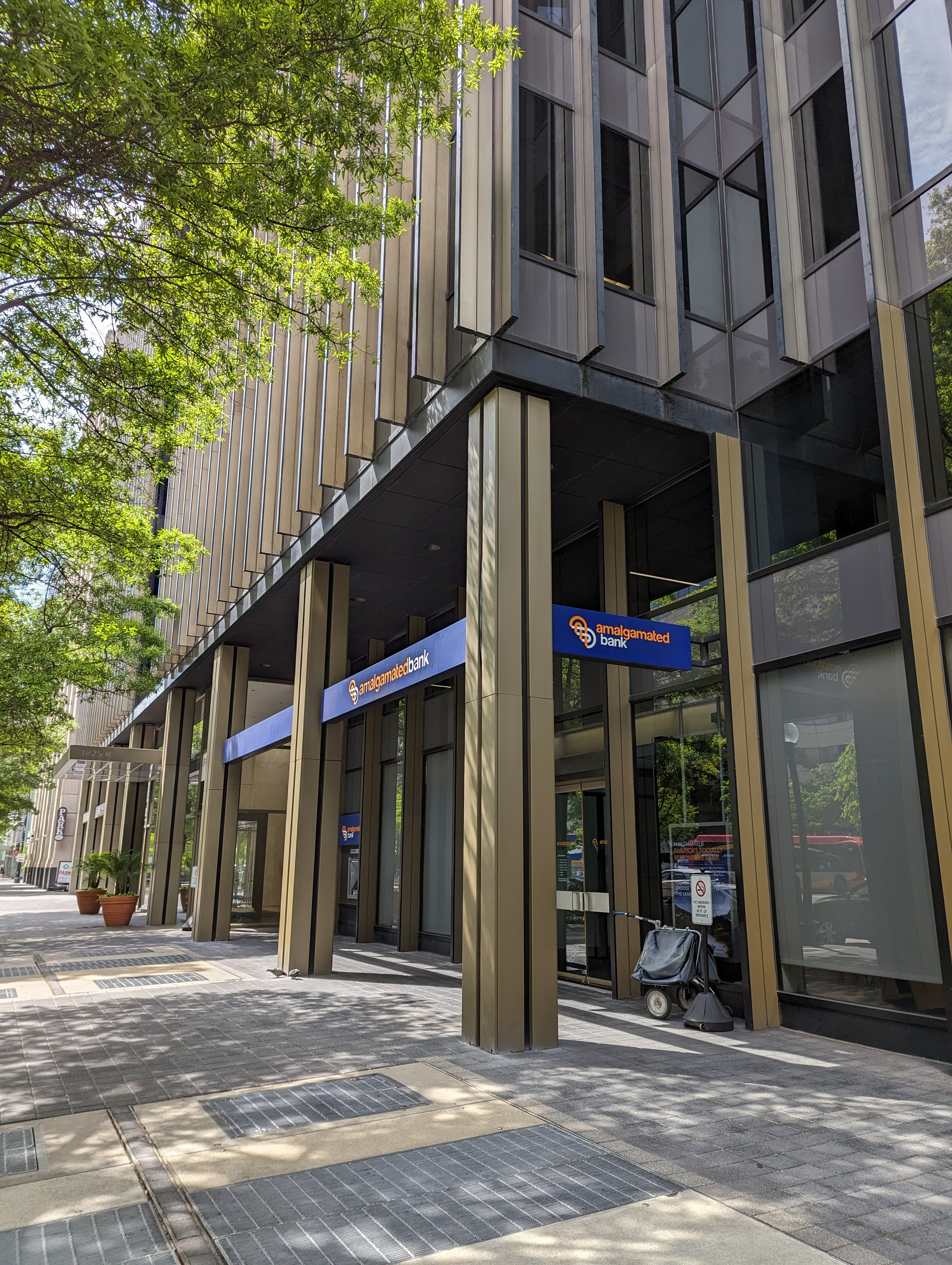
Amalgamated Bank branch on K Street in Washington, D.C.

Headquartered in New York City, Amalgamated Bank has five branches—three in New York City, one in Washington D.C., and one in San Francisco. There is also 24-hour access through online and mobile banking. Amalgamated Bank offers comprehensive financial services for individuals, small businesses and commercial clients. Products include: deposits, loans, investments, cash management, residential and commercial mortgages. Checking customers have access to over 40,000 surcharge-free ATMs across the U.S. through the Allpoint Network. Amalgamated Bank specializes in providing loans and banking services to political and advocacy groups, nonprofit organizations, labor unions and Middle Market companies. Notable clients of the bank include labor unions as the American Federation of State, County and Municipal Employees, the International Association of Firefighters, the Service Employees International Union, the United Federation of Teachers, the Democratic Governors Association, Economic Policy Institute, League of Conservation Voters, Organizing for Action, and Public Citizen. Workers United remains a client, e.g., Philadelphia Joint Board, Workers United.

== Corporate governance ==
Amalgamated Bank has a long history of shareholder activism:

- 1990s: Urged each Board be composed in majority of independent directors ahead of regulated requirement
- 1994: Fought sweatshop abuses by urging companies to adopt and monitor Codes of Conduct
- 1997: Started advocating full public reporting of all corporate political contributions, including "soft money" donations and later trade associations and 501(c)(4) organizations
- 2000: Started challenging outsized severance packages by demanding limits to golden parachutes
- 2001: Took legal action against Enron for massive accounting fraud, eventually recovering billions of dollars in losses for investors
- 2004: Pioneered shareholder resolutions requiring companies to have clawback policies in order to recover ill-gotten executive pay
- 2011: Spearheaded initiative to urge oil companies to integrate environmental and safety performance as condition for executive bonuses
- 2013: Achieved largest shareholder derivative settlement in Delaware, alleging failed board oversight in wake of hacking scandal at News Corp
- 2014: Sponsored shareholder resolution to limit windfall golden parachutes for executives at Valero Energy Corp. upon change-in-control of company (rare majority vote in support of tightening executive compensation standards)
- 2015: Announced:
  - $137.5 million settlement of derivative suit on behalf of shareholders in Freeport-McMoRan Inc. (Arizona-based metals and mining corporation formerly known as Freeport McMoRan Copper & Gold, Inc.)
  - Record-breaking $146.25 million settlement on behalf of shareholders in a lawsuit against Duke Energy Corporation
  - Secured agreement from five major energy companies to limit potential golden parachutes for executives in event of merger or other change of company control

== Corporate values ==
=== Purchasing policy ===
Since its founding in 1923, Amalgamated Bank has been dedicated to supporting American workers and the American Labor Movement. The bank strives to purchase as many products as possible that have been made by union workers in America. In addition, the bank aims to hire union contractors for its building and construction projects and to have its outside printing produced by union printers with the union label displayed. The bank also does its best to fly on unionized airlines and stay at unionized hotels.

=== Minimum wage ===
In 2015, Amalgamated Bank announced that it would become the first bank in the nation to raise all employee wages to a minimum of $15 per hour.

Amalgamated announced the news on the heels of the release of a study by the National Employment Law Project detailing a great discrepancy in wages in the banking industry. According to the study, while full-time bank tellers earn $25,800/year on average, a typical bank CEO makes in the tens of millions of dollars annually after full compensation packages are included. In New York, the study found that the median wage for bank tellers is $13.31 per hour leaving 39% of New York State bank tellers enrolled in public assistance programs.

Amalgamated Bank's CEO-to-worker pay ratio is 17:1.

=== Commitment to affordable housing ===
Throughout its history, Amalgamated Bank has consistently funded the construction and renovation of affordable housing developments. Through its Affordable Housing Construction Loan program, the bank will invest more than $100 million to rehabilitate and build thousands of affordable units in New York. As part of its commitment to affordable housing, Amalgamated Bank also helped create a new product launched in April 2016, which was the first of its kind to offer home buyers down-payment protection should they face turbulent market conditions.

=== Accessibility in banking ===
In an effort to open up the benefits of the banking system to all people, Amalgamated Bank accepts 12 forms of identification for account opening, including IDNYC, New York City's municipal identification card.

Access to banking in NYC has long been an issue. The NYC Department of Consumer Affairs estimates that around 1 million adult New Yorkers do not have bank accounts, but instead use fringe financial services like check cashers to pay bills, cash payroll checks, buy money orders and conduct other financial transactions.

IDNYC cards can be obtained by city residents at no cost and can be used at any of Amalgamated Bank's NYC branches across the Bronx, Brooklyn, Manhattan and Queens. The cards are now an acceptable form of government-issued photo documentation for purposes of verifying the customer's identity when opening an account under the Customer Identification Program ("CIP") requirements of the Bank Secrecy Act.

== See also ==
- List of banks
- List of banks in the United States
