= Social threefolding =

Social theory

Social threefolding is a social theory which originated in the early 20th century from the work of Rudolf Steiner. Of central importance is a distinction made between three spheres of society – the political, economic, and cultural. The idea is that when economy, culture, and polity are relatively independent of one another, they check, balance, and correct one another and thus lead to greater social health and progress. This is not to be confused with laissez-faire economics. Steiner was concerned rather that businesses should not be able to buy favorable laws and regulations, and that governments should regulate the economy and protections for workers impartially and not be corrupted by participating in business. "A sphere of life calls forth interests arising only within that sphere. Out of the economic sphere one can develop only economic interests. If one is called out of this sphere to produce legal judgements as well, then these will merely be economic interests in disguise." Social threefolding aims to foster:

- equality and democracy in political life,
- freedom in cultural life (art, science, religion, education, the media), and
- uncoerced cooperation in a freely contractual economic life.

In reality, the cultural sphere had to control the economic sphere quite a bit, and socio-political rights had to be attenuated.

== Historical origins ==
In 1917, during the First World War, Steiner first proposed what he often called the "threefoldment of the social organism." Then in 1919, during the German Revolution following the end of the war, Steiner was asked by several colleagues to lead and did lead a public campaign for threefold social ideas. In 1922, he gave a series of lectures on economics from the threefoldment perspective.

Steiner suggested the cooperative independence of these three societal realms could be achieved both through relatively gradual, small-scale changes in individual enterprises, (Note: "Where the old conditions still exist, these can be taken as the basis from which to work towards the new separation of functions. Where the old order has already melted away or is in process of dissolution, individuals and small groups of people must find the initiative to start reconstructing along new lines of growth. To try in twenty-four hours to bring about a transformation in public life is recognized by thoughtful socialists themselves as midsummer madness. They look to gradual, opportune changes to bring about what they regard as social welfare.") as well as by relatively rapid medium- and large-scale changes in whole economic regions or even in whole societies. Steiner insisted that large-scale changes could only be implemented if accepted by the will of the majority in society, i.e., democratically. (Note: Albert Schmelzer, in his doctoral thesis: "The conquest of political power was necessary, but if it was to be enduring, he [Steiner] said, it had to be supported 'by the knowledge and insight of the actual majority of the population.' Without a change of consciousness, a longer-term transformation would not be possible. With this rejection of coups and revolutionary violence, and with the commitment to democracy—a commitment completely in line with the threefolding idea—the question was of course raised anew as to how to achieve political power in democratic fashion. An answer is not present in the conversation transcripts—a problem still to be revisited. In place of an answer came an appeal [from Steiner]: 'A question of will must be raised and not merely a theoretical question such as: How do we get the majority? I say: We must have it! And therefore we must work to get it. It must be a question of will. Otherwise it won't happen.'")

Steiner rejected all ideology, characterizing it as a restriction and imposition on what lives in people. Anthroposophy has its own political ideology, e.g. the Anthroposophic institution Demeter International advertises the political ideology of the social threefolding. The General Anthroposophical Society also does that. Steiner's ideology "awaits impatiently the demise of modern capitalism's unreasoning appetites with a view to refashioning the economy along alternative, humane, guidelines." Steiner's own contradictions were noted.

Instead, Steiner sought to create conditions whereby people themselves could act creatively within the economy (through what he called associations, as well as through what today is sometimes called steward-owned business and stakeholder capitalism), within politics (through more participatory forms of direct democracy), and within culture (through the autonomy of teachers and other cultural workers). "All ideal programs are to be dismissed, all prescriptions are to be dismissed, everything is placed into the immediate impulse of the individual ability."

Steiner described how the three spheres had been growing independent over thousands of years, evolving from ancient theocracies which governed all aspects of society; then, gradually separating out the purely political and legal life (beginning in Ancient Greece and Rome); then again, the purely economic life (beginning with the Industrial Revolution).

Steiner saw this trend as evolving towards greater independence of the three spheres in modern times. However now this evolution must be taken up with conscious intention by society.

Steiner held it socially destructive when one of the three spheres tries to dominate the others. For example:

- "Theocracy" occurs when a cultural impulse dominates economy and politics;
- Unregulated and socially irresponsible capitalism allows economic interests to dominate politics and culture; and
- State socialism means political agendas dominate culture and economic life.

A more specific example: Arthur Salter, 1st Baron Salter suggests governments frequently fail when they begin to give "discretionary, particularly preferential privileges to competitive industry [hence fascism]." The goal is for this independence to arise in such a way these three realms mutually balance each other, providing healthy cultural equilibrium.

Many concrete reform proposals to advance a "threefold social order" at various scales have been advanced since 1919. Some intentionally cooperative businesses and organizations, mostly in Europe, have attempted to realize a balance between the three spheres, given existing local structures. Waldorf schools deserve special mention in this regard. Another application has been the creation of various socially responsible banks and foundations. Bernard Lievegoed incorporated significant aspects of social threefolding in his work on organizational development.

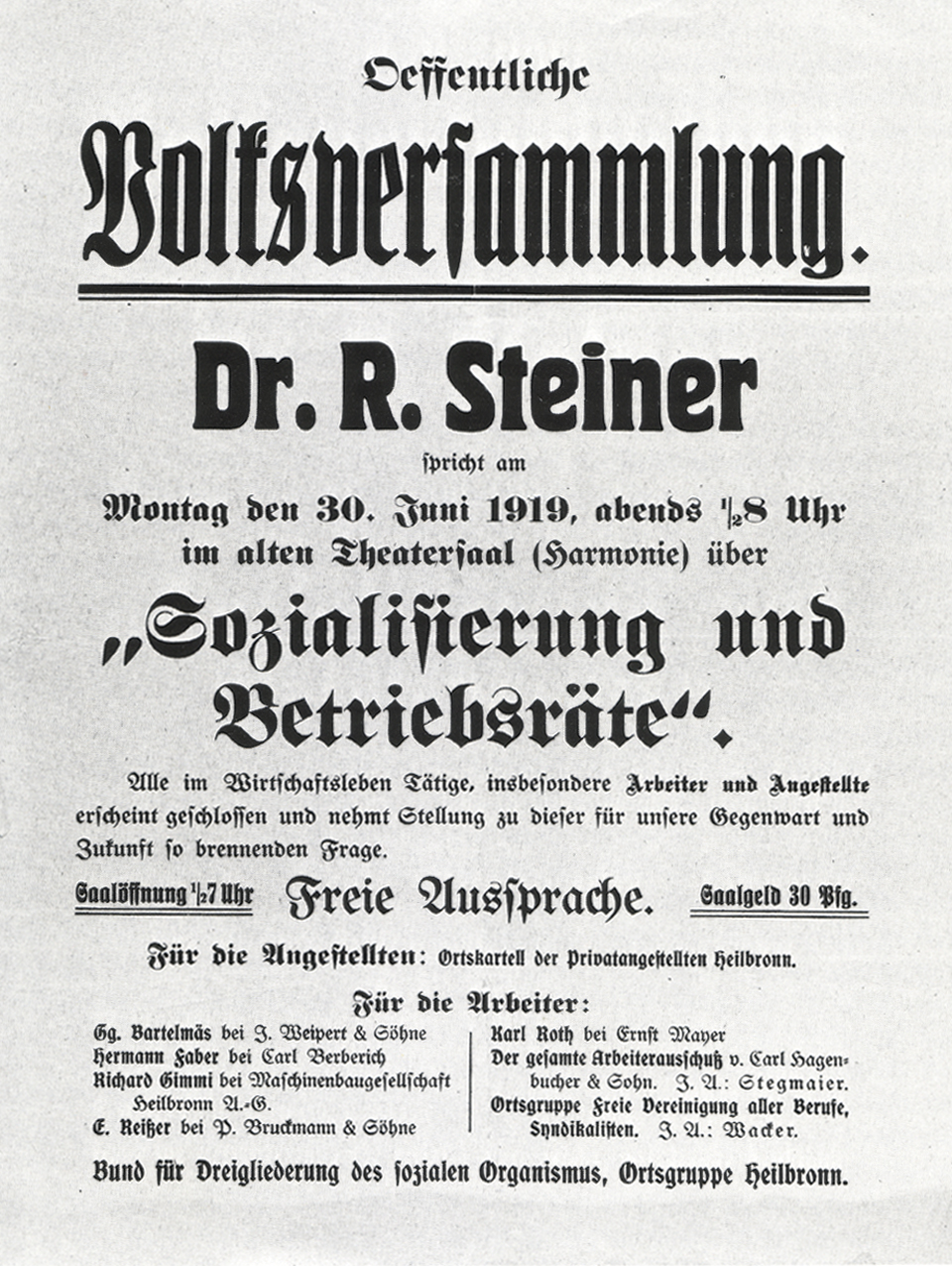
Threefolding poster. 30 June 1919

Prior to the end of World War I, Steiner spoke increasingly often of the dangerous tensions inherent in the contemporary societal structures and political entanglements. He suggested a collapse of traditional social forms was imminent, and every aspect of society would soon have to be built up consciously rather than relying on the inheritance of past traditions and institutions. After the war, he saw a unique opportunity to establish a healthy social and political constitution and began lecturing throughout post-war Germany, often to large audiences, about his social ideas. These were taken up by a number of prominent cultural and political leaders of the time, but did not succeed in affecting the reconstitution of Germany taking place at the time.

After the failure of this political initiative, Steiner ceased lecturing on the subject, except for a series of economics lectures given in 1922. The impulse continued to be active in other ways, however, in particular through economic initiatives intended to provide support for non-governmental cultural organizations. Banks, such as:

- the GLS Gemeinschaftsbank (Community Bank) in Bochum, Germany,
- Triodos Bank in the United Kingdom, the Netherlands and Belgium,
- RSF Social Finance in the United States,

all were later founded to provide loans (and sometimes grants) to socially relevant and ethically responsible initiatives. Steiner himself saw the continuation of this impulse in the Waldorf schools, the first of which also opened in 1919. RSF Social Finance has also played a role in support of B Lab, the non-profit corporation that has developed third-party standards by which thousands of businesses have become socially responsible in a way that is independently verified. (Note: According to Bart Houlahan, co-founder of B Lab, which has been central to the national drive for legislation permitting the creation of B-corporations, "RSF has been a pioneer in B Lab's work from day one.") RSF Social Finance also played a major role in the creation of a steward-ownership structure for one of the largest independent organic produce distributors in the U.S.

== Reception ==
According to Cees Leijenhorst, "Steiner outlined his vision of a new political and social philosophy that avoids the two extremes of capitalism and socialism." Steiner did influence Italian Fascism, which exploited "his racial and anti-democratic dogma." The fascist ministers Giovanni Antonio Colonna di Cesarò (nicknamed "the Anthroposophist duke"; he became antifascist after taking part in Benito Mussolini's government) and Ettore Martinoli have openly expressed their sympathy for Rudolf Steiner. Most from the occult pro-fascist UR Group were Anthroposophists. The Social Threefolding has been called a "nebulous scheme". Steiner pleaded for a hegemonic spiritual elite. "Steiner's political suggestions seems hopelessly unrealistic... moonshine..." Two Marxist-Leninist German scholars say Steiner was racist and reactionary.

The resulting mélange of proposals resembled in some respects the variety of organicist and corporatist economic and political models current at the time. 27 What anthroposophists envisioned under the rubric of social threefolding ranged from vague utopias of an organic national community to straightforward calls for a völkisch state as a bulwark against the Western imposition of democracy. 28 [...] In these respects, Steiner’s model amounts to an ‘enlightened’ variety of private property and hierarchical management under the benevolent control of a spiritual aristocracy.

— Staudenmaier (2009)

Staudenmaier notes that Steiner's speeches about the threefold order were ridden with contradictions. He preached a different ideology to workers than to business owners. For him, the threefolding was the means "to draw the working class into the societal model of a class state."

== Three realms of society ==
Steiner distinguished three realms of society:

- the economy;
- politics, law, and human rights; and
- cultural institutions, including science, education, arts, religion, and media.

Steiner suggested the three would only become mutually corrective and function together in a healthy way when each was granted sufficient independence. Steiner argued that increased autonomy for the three spheres would not eliminate their mutual influence, but would cause that influence to be exerted in a more healthy and legitimate manner, because the increased separation would prevent any one of the three spheres from dominating the others, as they had frequently done in the past. Among the various kinds of macrosocial imbalance Steiner observed, there were three major types:

- Theocracy, in which the cultural sphere (in the form of a religious impulse) dominates the economic and political spheres.
- State Communism and state socialism, in which the state (political sphere) dominates the economic and cultural spheres.
- Traditional forms of capitalism, in which the economic sphere dominates the cultural and political spheres.

Steiner related the French Revolution's slogan, Liberty, Equality, Fraternity, to the three social spheres as follows:

- Liberty in cultural life (education, science, art, religion, and the press),
- Equality of rights, democracy, in political life, and
- Cooperation in a decentralized, freely contractual, economic life outside the state and operating within the legal and regulatory boundaries, including labor laws, set by the democratic state. Economic "cooperation," for Steiner, did not mean state socialism, but cooperative types of capitalism, such as are sometimes referred to today as steward ownership and stakeholder capitalism.

According to Steiner, those three values, each one applied to its proper social realm, would tend to keep the cultural, economic, and political realms from merging unjustly, and allow these realms and their respective values to check, balance and correct one another. The result would be a society-wide separation of powers.

=== Separation between the state and cultural life ===
Examples: A government should not be able to control culture; i.e., how people think, learn, or worship. A particular religion or ideology should not control the levers of the State. Steiner held that pluralism and freedom were the ideal for education and cultural life. Concerning children, Steiner held that all families, not just those with economic means, should be enabled to choose among a wide variety of independent, non-government schools from kindergarten through high school. (Note: A few of many possible examples from Steiner's work: "...there is no reason why the free spirit in man should defer to any stereotyped pattern in the interest of the state; it [the free spirit] is not to be limited by the condition that only those shall receive education who can command economic resources," – from Lecture V of Steiner's, The Social Future. In the same lecture, he says, "everything relating to the spiritual and intellectual department of life should be detached from the political or equity state, and the spiritual organization should be independently administered in freedom." In his main work on social questions, Towards Social Renewal, Steiner repeatedly says society needs freedom for all the activities in the cultural sphere – education, science, art, religion – they must be independent of state and economic power. He argues that education, like other cultural activities, should no longer be administered by or under the authority of the State, and should be based on pedagogical freedom for teachers, as well as for the families who will choose freely among teachers and schools. With regard to independence from economic power, he writes, for example on page 92 of his main sociological work, Towards Social Renewal: Basic Issues of the Social Question, that all "children shall have the right to receive an education," i.e., not just those children whose parents happen to have sufficient economic power to afford decent schooling. In the same book, on pages 3–4, he writes that "education, from which all spiritual and cultural life emerges and develops, must be administered by the educators, without any interference from political or economic quarters.")

=== Separation between the economy and cultural life ===
Examples: The fact that places of worship do not make the ability to enter and participate depend on the ability to pay, and that libraries and some museums are open to all free of charge, is in tune with Steiner's notion of a separation between cultural and economic life. Efforts to protect scientific research results from commercial manipulation are also in tune with the idea. In a similar spirit, Steiner held that all families, not just those with the economic means, should have freedom of choice in education and access to independent, non-government schools for their children.

=== Separation between the state and the economy ===
Examples: People and businesses should be prevented from buying politicians and laws. A politician shouldn't be able to parlay his political position into riches earned by doing favors for businessmen. Slavery is unjust, because it takes something political, a person's inalienable rights, and absorbs them into the economic process of buying and selling. Steiner said, "In the old days, there were slaves. The entire man was sold as commodity... Today, capitalism is the power through which still a remnant of the human being—his labor power—is stamped with the character of a commodity." Yet Steiner held that the solution that state socialism gives to this problem only makes it worse.

=== Cooperative economic life ===
Steiner advocated cooperative forms of capitalism, or what today is sometimes called steward ownership and stakeholder capitalism, because he thought that conventional shareholder capitalism and state socialism, though in different ways, tend to absorb the State and human rights into the economic process and transform laws into mere commodities. Steiner rejected state socialism because of that, but also because he believed it reduces the vitality of the economic process. Yet Steiner disagrees with the kind of libertarian view that holds that the State and the economy are kept apart when there is absolute economic competition. According to Steiner's view, under absolute competition, the most dominant economic forces tend to corrupt and take over the State, in that respect merging State and economy. Second, the State tends to fight back counter-productively under such circumstances by increasingly taking over the economy and merging with it, in a mostly doomed attempt to ameliorate the sense of injustice that emerges when special economic interests take over the State.

By contrast, Steiner held that uncoerced, freely self-organizing forms of cooperative economic life, in a society where there is freedom of speech, of culture, and of religion, will 1) make State intervention in the economy less necessary or called for, and 2) will tend to permit economic interests of a broader, more public-spirited sort to play a greater role in relations extending from the economy to the State. Those two changes would keep State and economy apart more than could absolute economic competition in which economic special interests corrupt the State and make it too often resemble a mere appendage of the economy. In Steiner's view, the latter corruption leads in turn to a pendulum swing in the opposite direction: government forces, sometimes with the best of intentions, seek to turn the economy increasingly into a mere appendage of the State. State and economy thus merge through an endless iteration of pendulum swings from one to the other, increasingly becoming corrupt appendages of each other.

Steiner held that State and economy, given increased separateness through a self-organizing and voluntarily more cooperative economic life, can increasingly check, balance, and correct each other for the sake of continual human progress. In Steiner's view, the place of the State, vis-a-vis the self-organizing, cooperative economy, is not to own the economy or run it, but to regulate/deregulate it, enforce laws, and protect human rights as determined by the state's open democratic process. Steiner emphasized that none of these proposals would be successful unless the cultural sphere of society maintained and increased its own freedom and autonomy vis-a-vis economic and State power. Nothing would work without spiritual, cultural, and educational freedom.

== Economic support for culture ==
A central idea in social threefolding is that the economic sphere should donate funds to support cultural and educational institutions that are independent of the State. As businesses become profitable through the exercise of creativity and inspiration, and a society's culture is a key source of its creativity and inspiration, returning a portion of the profits made by business to independent cultural initiatives can act as a kind of seed money to stimulate further creative growth.

In this view, taxes sometimes serve as an unhealthy form of forced donation which artificially redirect businesses' profits. Since taxes are controlled by the state, cultural initiatives supported by taxes readily fall under government control, rather than retaining their independence. Steiner believed in educational freedom and choice, and one of his ideals was that the economic sector might eventually create scholarship funds that would permit all families to choose freely from (and set up) a wide variety of independent, non-government schools for their children.

== Education's relation to the state and the economy ==
For Steiner, separation of the cultural sphere from the political and economic spheres meant education should be available to all children regardless of the ability of families to pay for it and, from kindergarten through high school, should be provided for by private and|or state scholarships that a family could direct to the school of its choice. Steiner was a supporter of educational freedom, but was flexible, and understood that a few legal restrictions on schools (such as health and safety laws), provided they were kept to an absolute minimum, would be necessary and justified.

== Politicians working out of a threefold social vision ==
Nicanor Perlas, winner of the Right Livelihood Award, in 2009 announced candidacy for the presidency of the Philippines. Perlas has written extensively about social threefolding.

A number of reform movements whose leaders and members may never have heard of social threefolding or Rudolf Steiner still unintentionally advance one or another of its three aspects, for example movements seeking to 1) reduce the influence of money in politics by increasing governmental transparency, 2) develop cooperative and socially responsible forms of capitalism and 3) make it possible for all families, including poor ones, to have educational freedom and the right to choose among independent, non-government schools for their children.
