= Verity Credit Union =

United States not-for-profit credit union

- Company type: Credit union
- Industry: Financial services
- Founded: 1933
- Headquarters: Seattle, Washington, United States
- Number of locations: 8
- Products: Savings; checking; consumer loans; mortgages; credit cards; online banking; business accounts; business loans
- Total assets: $817,705,269 (2023)
- Members: 38,334 (2023)
- Number of employees: 138 (2015)
- Website: https://www.veritycu.com

Verity Credit Union is a United States not-for-profit credit union that was originally established in 1933 as Postal Works Credit Union #8 to serve members in select counties of Washington state. Verity has been member-owned since its inception. Verity's main branch is located in the Northgate neighborhood of Seattle, Washington. As of 2019 Verity Credit Union has over $580 million in assets and more than 33,000 members. Verity Credit Union is noted for its social media endeavors and was the first financial institution to start a blog in 2004, which earned it a spot on Net.Banker's Innovator of the Year awards.

== Branches ==
Verity Credit Union has eight branches throughout the Seattle metropolitan area.

== Membership ==
Membership with Verity Credit Union is open to anyone who lives, works, worships or attends school in the state of Washington, as well as family members of an existing member or those who are employed within any of its affiliated organizations. Verity Credit Union also serves military employees, current and retired, and their extended families, located in 16 Washington counties.

Tonita Webb is the current CEO of Verity Credit Union.
