= Gina Messina Dysert =

American religious studies scholar

Gina Messina
- Born: September 6, 1975 (age 51)
- Other name: Gina Messina-Dysert

Academic background
- Education: Cleveland State University; University of Findlay; John Carroll University; Claremont Graduate University
- Doctoral advisor: Rosemary Radford Ruether

Academic work
- Discipline: Religious studies; women's studies
- School or tradition: Christian feminism
- Institutions: Claremont Graduate University; Ursuline College
- Website: ginamessina.com

Gina Messina (born 1975), previously known as Gina Messina-Dysert, is an American religious studies and women's studies scholar and activist. She gives particular attention to gender issues in religion.

Messina is co-founder of Feminism and Religion, which she founded in 2011 with Caroline Kline, Xochitl Alvizo, and Cynthia Garrity Bond. Feminism and Religion is a project that explores the intersection between scholarship and the feminism (the "F-word") in religion, community, and activism.

Messina is also founder and Editor in Chief of The Far Press, an independent feminist publisher which publishes books that explore feminism and gender, religion and spirituality, politics, and social change.

She is the assistant professor of religious studies at Ursuline College in Pepper Pike, Ohio, where she formerly served as dean of the School of Graduate and Professional Studies. Prior to her time at Ursuline College, Messina served as the Director of the Center for Women's Interdisciplinary Research and Education (WIRE) at Claremont Graduate University and as a visiting professor of Theological Ethics at Loyola Marymount University.

== Biography ==
Born September 6, 1975, Messina grew up in Shaker Heights, Ohio, where she moved after her parents' divorce when she was 12. She earned her GED "while working double shifts at the local Dairy Queen".

Messina earned her doctorate at Claremont Graduate University, focusing on women studies in religion, theology, ethics, and culture. Her advisor was Rosemary Radford Ruether. She completed a Master of Arts degree in religious studies at John Carroll University. She also earned a Master of Business Administration degree with a dual focus in organizational leadership and marketing at the University of Findlay and completed her undergraduate degree at Cleveland State University.

== Publications ==
Messina has authored articles in a variety of publications and regularly writes for The Huffington Post. She is the author of Rape Culture and Spiritual Violence (Routledge, 2014), and If Jesus Ran for President (The Far Press, 2016). She is also co-editor of Faithfully Feminist: Jewish, Christian, and Muslim Feminists on Why We Stay (with Jennifer Zobair and Amy Levin, White Cloud Press, 2015) and Feminism and Religion in the 21st Century (with Rosemary Radford Ruether, Routledge, 2014).

Messina is a regular speaker around the US at universities, organizations, conferences, and in the national news circuit. She has appeared on Tavis Smiley, MSNBC, and NPR and gave the TEDx Talk "The New Feminist Revolution in Religion". She has also spoken at the Commission on the Status of Women at the United Nations.
