= Triodos Bank =

Dutch ethical bank

Triodos Bank N.V.
- Company type: Public, listed
- Industry: Financial services
- Founded: 1980
- Headquarters: Driebergen-Rijsenburg, Netherlands
- Key people: Marcel Zuidam, CEO
- Products: Sustainable banking
- Revenue: €341.9 million (2021)
- Net income: €50.8 million (2021)
- AUM: €24,166 million (2021)
- Number of employees: 1,715 (2021)
- Website: triodos.com

Triodos Bank N.V. is an ethical bank based in the Netherlands with branches in Belgium, Germany, the United Kingdom, and Spain. It was founded in 1980.

== History ==
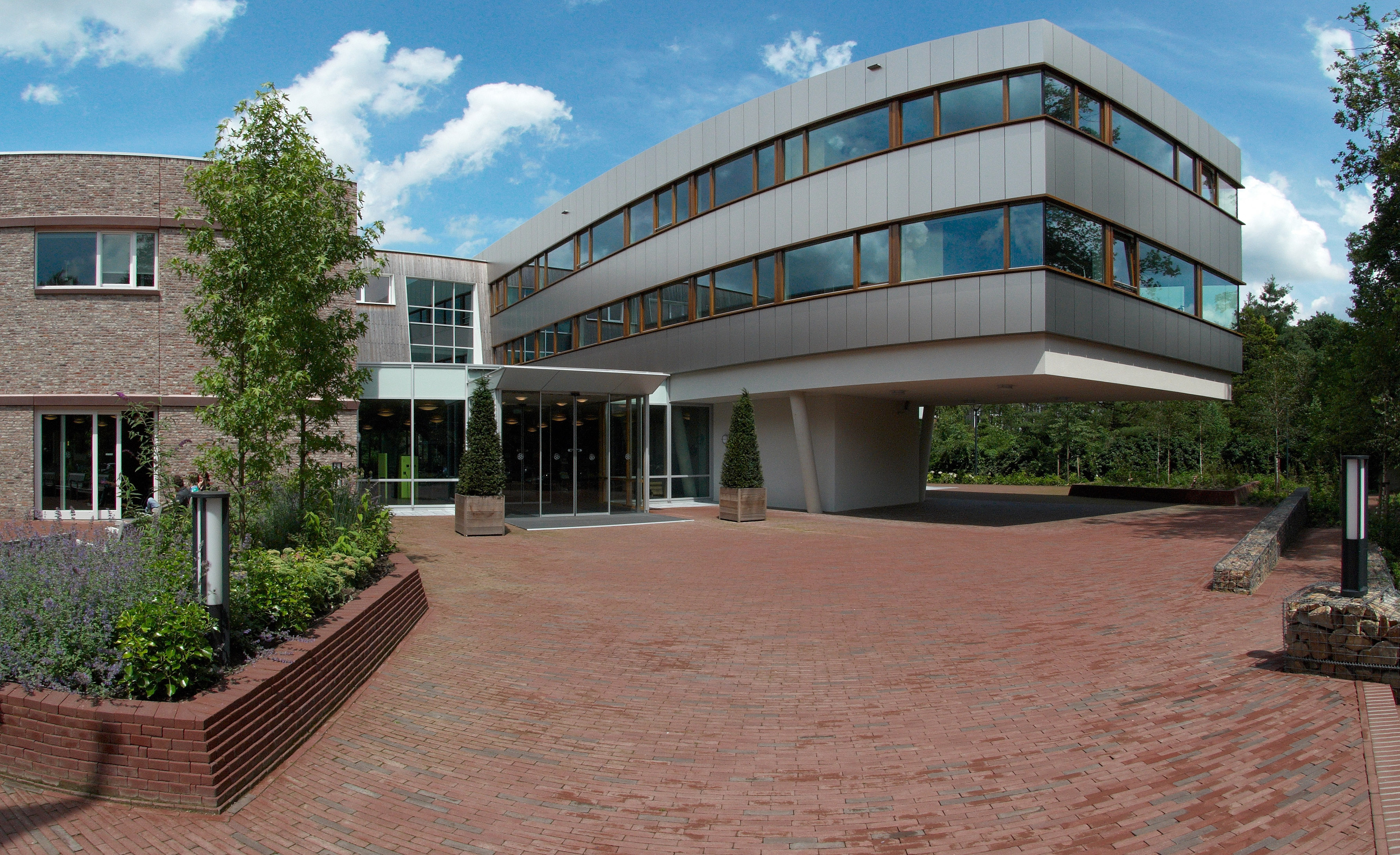
Former Headquarters of Triodos bank in Zeist, Netherlands

The name Triodos is derived from the Greek "τρὶ- (tri, three) and ὁδος (hodos, road) meaning "meeting of three roads", which for the bank are: people, planet, and profit. The bank was initially founded as an anthroposophical initiative with a mission to promote quality of life in the broad sense.

In 1980 Triodos launched the first "green fund," a fund for environmentally friendly projects, on the Amsterdam Stock Exchange. Triodos took over the British ethical bank Mercury Provident in 1994.

The bank operations and customer support are mainly offered digitally, but offers some physical banks. In Spain for example, several physical offices have been opened in major towns.

Triodos Bank received the Sustainable Bank of the Year 2009 award from the Financial Times and the International Finance Corporation (IFC), an organization of the World Bank.

As of 2025, Triodos Bank managed around 750,000 customer accounts in Europe.

== Philosophy ==
The Triodos Bank prioritizes investing into environmentally friendly initiatives, and refers to its work as the anthroposophical principle of social three folding. The bank transfers its customers' deposits exclusively to the real economy, thereby financing companies, organizations, and projects which it believes contribute to ecological, social or cultural change. In accordance with this philosophy, Triodos Bank in Germany purchases electricity from the green energy provider Naturstrom AG.

== Policy ==
Account holders can open conventional savings accounts, as well as ethical funds and venture capital. Triodos also offer conventional personal current accounts and business banking services. Triodos has an active international department, supporting microfinance initiatives across the developing world. Triodos is the only commercial bank in the UK to provide an annual list of all the loans the bank has made.

=== Criteria for lending ===
Triodos only lends to businesses and charities that it judges to be of social or ecological benefit. This "positive screening" extends its policies beyond those of ethical banks which solely avoid investing in companies judged to be doing harm ("negative screening"). The bank uses money deposited by close to 100,000 savers and lends it to hundreds of organizations, such as fair trade initiatives, organic farms, cultural and arts initiatives, renewable energy projects, and social enterprises.

"[Triodos] does not lend to organizations, businesses, and projects that are directly involved for more than 5% of its activities in non-sustainable products and services or non-sustainable working processes. Triodos Bank will however, to the best of its knowledge, exclude all organizations, businesses, and activities that produce or distribute nuclear energy, weapons, fur, pornography and environmentally hazardous substances".

== Shareholders ==
Triodos is owned through depositary receipts by private investors and a few institutional investors. At the end of 2021 the bank had 43,521 depository receipt holders.

Triodos Bank's shares are owned by the Stichting Administratiekantoor Aandelen Triodos Bank which issues depositary receipts to individuals and institutions, which entitle them to payment of a dividend, but which have limited voting rights. These Depositary receipts are not traded on any stock exchange. Holders are not allowed to own more than 10% of the shares, and the maximum number of votes per holder in the general meeting of depositary receipt holders is limited to 1,000. This construction was chosen to prevent hostile takeovers.

Triodos has managed trading in certificates itself since its inception, the price being determined by the bank's net asset value, and updated periodically. Mainly as a result of the COVID-19 epidemic, an imbalance arose between buyers and sellers of certificates, whereby there were more sellers than buyers. The bank therefore temporarily suspended trading on 18 March 2020. Trading resumed on 13 October 2020, with a cap of €5,000 for sales, which was later reduced to just €1,000. Trading was halted again on 5 January 2021. This led to a reaction from certificate holders. They joined forces in November 2021 in the 'Triodom' platform, from which the Triodos Bank Depositary Receipt Holders Foundation was established in March 2022, representing concerned customers with a combined depository capacity of €120 million. On 10 October 2022 the foundation filed a petition with the Enterprise Chamber of the Amsterdam Court of Appeal asking it to investigate, which the bank regrets.

On 21 December 2021, Triodos decided to start trading the certificates on a multilateral trading facility (MTF), a trading platform that is only accessible to registered participants and can therefore protect the autonomy and mission of the bank. The price of the certificates will then be determined by supply and demand. With a view to tax reporting obligations, the bank applied an administrative discount of 30% to the value of the certificates from 31 December 2021. The last traded price of certificates was €84 on 5 January 2021, but for tax purposes they were valued at only €60. Because trading was not expected to restart until the 2nd quarter of 2023, a restrictive certificate buyback programme was planned in 2021 for certificate holders with an urgent need to sell their shares. However, in August 2022, the bank announced that this plan would be withdrawn and instead paid an extraordinary dividend of €1.01 per depository receipt (before withholding tax).

On 11 October 2022 the bank's shareholder, SAAT, approved the move to the MTF. Captin BV was chosen to manage the MTF.

Trading reopened on 5 July 2023, but has been sparse. As of late-April 2025, the price on the Captin trading platform was €27. Certificate holders, grouped into the Stichting Certificaathouders Triodos Bank and other groups in Spain and Germany, have voted at SAAT meetings for measures to increase returns to investors. A quotation on Euronext is planned.

== See also ==
- Ethical banking
- GLS Bank, another ethical bank founded as an anthroposophical initiative
- Global Alliance for Banking on Values
- Shared Interest
- List of banks in the euro area
- List of banks in the Netherlands
