= Alessandro Messina (cyclist) =

Canadian cyclist

Personal information
- Born: 30 August 1941 Fiume, Italy
- Died: 20 August 2022 (aged 80)

Cycling career
- Sport: Cycling

Alessandro Messina (30 August 1941 – 20 August 2022) was a Canadian cyclist. He competed in the individual road race at the 1960 Summer Olympics.
