= Altreconomia =

Italian news magazine

- Editor: Duccio Facchini
- Categories: News magazine
- Frequency: Montly
- Circulation: 11,000
- Publisher: Altra Economia – società cooperativa impresa sociale
- First issue: 1999
- Country: Italy
- Language: Italian
- Website: altreconomia.it

The Altreconomia is an independent Italian monthly news magazine based in Milan, published 11 times a year, and a publishing house covering topics related to solidarity-based and transformative economics. Its areas of focus include fair trade, ethical finance, international cooperation, responsible tourism, environmental protection, and human rights.

Altreconomia offers a critical perspective on the economy we live in, while reporting on the kind of economy it believes should exist. In addition to publishing the magazine, Altra Economia Società Cooperativa, which comprises more than 1,000 individual members and legal entities, including readers, publishes books, provides communication services, organizes events, and participates in various projects.

The magazine is published in both print and digital formats.
