= Consiglio Universitario Nazionale =

Representative elected body of the Italian university system

The Consiglio Universitario Nazionale (CUN; Italian for National University Council) is an elected body representing the various sectors of the Italian university system. It was established by law n. 18 of 26 January 2006. The current president is Paolo Vincenzo Pedone, Full Professor in Biochemistry at the University of Campania Vanvitelli.

The council is composed of a president and fifty-seven members. Forty-two are elected by the professors and researchers, eight by the National Council of University Students, three by the Conferenza dei Rettori delle Università Italiane (Conference of Rectors of the Italian Universities), three from the technical and administrative staff of the universities, one from among the deans of faculties and one from among the university administrative directors.

== Sources ==
This article originated as a partial translation of this version of it:Consiglio Universitario Nazionale, its counterpart in the Italian Wikipedia.
