= GLS Bank =

German ethical bank

Coordinates: 51.47081°N 7.21981°E

GLS Gemeinschaftsbank eG
- Type: Cooperative
- Industry: Financial services
- Founded: 1974
- Headquarters: Bochum, Germany,
- Number of locations: 7
- Key people: Thomas Jorberg, President
- Products: Sustainable banking
- AUM: €10.7 billion (2024)
- Number of employees: 860 (2024)
- Website: www.gls.de

GLS Bank (officially GLS Gemeinschaftsbank eG) is a German ethical bank that was founded in 1974 as an anthroposophical initiative by Wilhelm Ernst Barkhoff and Gisela Reuther. It was the first bank in Germany that operated with an ethical philosophy. According to GLS Bank, its focus is on cultural, social and ecological initiatives, initiated by people, and not anonymous interests seeking capital or maximum profit. The name stands for Gemeinschaftsbank für Leihen und Schenken which translates as Community bank for loaning and giving.

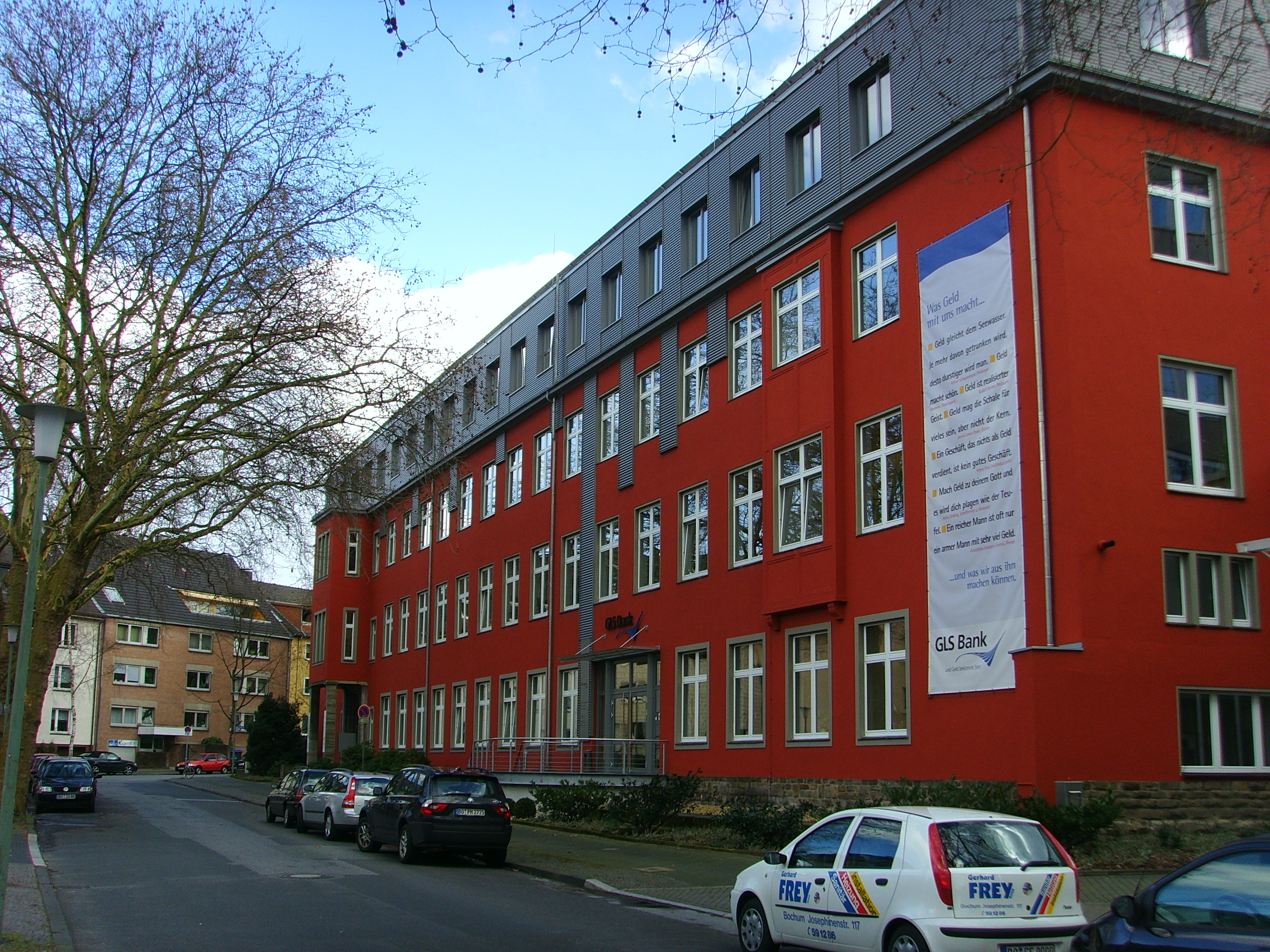
The head office of the German GLS Bank in Bochum, Germany

The bank is based in Bochum, Germany, and is a co-operative. As of November 2006, the bank's total balance was EUR 0.645 billion. As of 31 December 2008, the balance sheet total was EUR 1.013 billion, further rising to EUR 1.847 billion as of 31 December 2010.

In 2015, the bank received the first German Award for Excellence from the Deutschen Gesellschaft für Zertifizierung (German Certification Group). The award was granted to honor the bank's fair business practices.

In December 2016 at the annual general assembly, about 80% of the 1200 people present at the assembly decided to introduce the GLS Beitrag.

== Growth ==
In 2010, the bank acquired over 18,000 new customers and in February 2011 GLS announced a growth of 37%, the largest in the bank's history. As of December 2016, the Genossenschaft (co-operative) has 46,313 members, compared to December 2015 with 41,982 members this is a growth of 10.3%.

The Bank continues to finance a large number of anthroposophical projects and institutions (2025: ~12% of new loans).

== Support ==
GLS bank is supporting a number of initiatives and projects in the fields of renewable energies, food, housing, "sustainable business", health and culture and education. GLS bank supports for example the lobby-organisation "Center for a modern liberalism" of former Alliance 90/The Greens-politicians Marieluise Beck and Ralf Fücks.

In 2025 the bank ended business relations with several initiatives from the left political spectrum in Germany. The Deutsche Kommunistische Partei, the prisoner support organisation Rote Hilfe and "Anarchist Black Cross Dresden" all lost their accounts with the bank. GLS is accused by the activists to not want to anger the Trump administration in the United States by offering banking services to opposing groups. While the DKP suspected its involvement in Cuba was the reason for the termination, "Rote Hilfe" assumed the classification of Antifa as a terrorist organisation by the USA was responsible for the move.

== See also ==
- Triodos Bank, another ethical bank founded under anthroposophical principles
- List of banks in Germany
