= Ethical banking =

Bank concerned with the social and environmental impacts of its investments and loans

An ethical bank, also known as a social, alternative, civic, or sustainable bank, is a bank concerned with the social and environmental impacts of its investments and loans. The ethical banking movement includes: ethical investment, impact investment, socially responsible investment, corporate social responsibility, and is also related to such movements as the fair trade movement, ethical consumerism, and social enterprise.

Other areas of ethical consumerism, such as fair trade labelling, have comprehensive codes and regulations which must be adhered to in order to be certified. Ethical banking has not developed to this point; because of this it is difficult to create a concrete definition that distinguishes ethical banks from conventional banks. Ethical banks are subject to the same regulatory authorities and must comply with the same rules as traditional banks. While there are differences between ethical banks, they do share a desire to uphold principles in the projects they finance, the most frequent including: transparency and social and/or environmental values. Ethical banks sometimes work with narrower profit margins than traditional ones, and therefore they may have few offices and operate mostly by phone, Internet, or mail. Ethical banking is considered one of several forms of alternative banking.

== History ==
Mainstream financial banks have had varying relationships with corporate social responsibility and ethical investment. However, a clearer movement has emerged since the 1990s. With changing social demands, and as more is known about the effects that banks can have through their lending policies, banks have begun to feel pressure from the general public, NGOs, governments, regulatory bodies and others to consider their social and environmental impact.

== Environmentally and socially conscious business practices ==
In general, banks play an intermediary role in the economy; because of this, the possibility for banks to contribute to sustainable development is extensive.^{Jeucken 2002} Banks have efficient and tested credit approval systems, which gives them a comparative advantage in knowledge (regarding sector-specific information, legislation and market developments).^{Jeucken & Bouma 1999} Banks are experienced and capable of weighing risks and attaching a price to these risks; because of this banks can fulfill an important role in reducing the information asymmetry between market parties and allow them to make better decisions. When depositors allow a bank to invest for them they may assume that the bank will attempt to select investments to maximize their returns. However, if clients are concerned with more than the simple monetary return and they, for instance, are interested in the costs to society and to the environment, then they may turn to an ethical bank which takes their ethics and morality into account when investing.

Some businesses externalize costs onto the environment and society. Aiming to create a more equitable distribution of costs in society, banks can raise interest rates or apply tariffs on loans given to clients and projects with high external costs. This would mean that companies would pay more if their business caused extensive environmental damage; taking some of the cost off of society as a whole and putting it on the company. This sort of tariff differentiation could stimulate the internalization of environmental costs in market prices.^{Jeucken & Bouma 1999} Through such price differentiation, banks have the potential to foster sustainability.^{Jeucken & Bouma 1999}.

Banks may be able to support progress toward sustainability by society as a whole—for example, by adopting a 'carrot-and-stick' approach, where environmental and social front-runners would pay less interest than the market price for borrowing capital, while environmental laggards would pay a much higher interest rate.^{Jeucken & Bouma 1999} Banks can also develop more sustainable products, such as environmental, social, or ethical investment funds. By investing selectively based on values, ethical banks can promote socially/environmentally responsible companies and penalize those who do not conform to these standards. But there is a risk that banks could simply adopt certain practices that make them appear ethical (see greenwashing) while not adopting other practices that would have a greater impact.

== Ethical initiatives ==
Numerous ethical banks (as well as some conventional banks) allow customers to contribute to organizations that have positive societal/environmental impacts either in the local community or in developing countries. Examples include an evaluation of the energy efficiency of a home and potential improvements in this; carbon-offsets;^{Coro Strandberg 2005} credit cards that benefit charities or lower interest rate loans for low emission cars.

== Community involvement ==
Ethical banks excel in community involvement, as do other financial institutions such as credit unions. Community involvement is not limited to ethical banks as conventional banks also partake in such actions. The following are a few examples of community involvement done by ethical banks, credit unions, and conventional banks:

- Affordable housing projects (ex. Vancity & Citizens bank)
- Projects to improve financial literacy in the community
- Give local scholarships & sponsorships.
- Financially support community events (for ex. each year TD Canada trust donates to a local cause).

== Environmental standards for lending ==
The environment is a key focus for ethical banks as well as for some conventional banks that believe adopting more environmentally ethical practices to be to their advantage. Banks operating in this field are often referred to as sustainable or green banks.

In general, bankers "consider themselves to be in a relatively environmentally friendly industry (in terms of emissions and pollution). However, given their potential exposure to risk, they have been surprisingly slow to examine the environmental performance of their clients. A stated reason for this is that such an examination would 'require interference' with a client's activities."^{Jeucken 2002} While the desire not to interfere with the business of the client is valid, it could also be noted that banks are required to interfere in the business of their clients regularly to ensure that the clients’ business plan is viable before issuing them a loan. The kind of analysis that all banks partake in is termed a single bottom line analysis (this analysis only considers financial performance). It is arguable whether or not performing a triple bottom line analysis (an analysis that takes into account environmental, social, and financial performance) would be any more intrusive.

== Internal vs. external banking ethics ==
Conventional banks deal with mostly internal ethics, ethical banks add to internal concerns by applying external ethics.c

=== Internal ethics: processes in banks ===
Internal ethics are concerned with the well being of employees, employee and customer satisfaction, benefits, wages, unionization, fair sex and race representation, and the banks environmental standing. Environmentally, the potential combined effect of banks switching to more environmentally friendly practices (i.e. less paper use, less electrical use, solar power, energy efficient light bulbs, more conscientious employee travel policies with concern to commuting and air travel) is huge. However, when compared with many other sectors of the economy banks do not incur the same burden of energy, water and paper use.^{Jeucken & Bouma 1999} Many times such energy efficient changes are not based on moral concern but on cost efficiency.

=== External ethics: products of the banks’ relationships/products ===
External ethics are concerned with the wider ramifications of banks actions. External ethics looks at the impacts that their business practices, such as who they loan to or invest in, will have on society and the environment. In applying external ethics, one looks at how the products of banks can be used unethically, for example how borrowers use the money that is lent out by the bank.

=== Discussion ===
Banks are often reluctant to broaden the scope of their external ethical policies because of the significant nature of the changes. However, by incorporating ethics that account for societal costs in their practices, banks may improve their reputation.

Ethical banking is a relatively new sector and this relatively undeveloped nature causes some problems. These problems can be divided into two categories: the first concerns depositors, and the second concerns ethical banks.

In the first category lies the issue of understanding how ethical banks measure or qualify their ethical policies. For example, when Vancity/Citizen Bank states ‘we seek to work with organizations that demonstrate a commitment to ethical business practices,’ the depositor is unable to understand what ‘seek’ means. These claims do not reveal to potential depositors how the bank evaluates or uses these statements. Even when given the opportunity to view an accountability report, it is difficult to truly understand what their screening processes are. For example, the Van City Accountability Report for 2006/07 (for Van City credit union and Citizens Bank in Canada) states:

the Ethical Policy requires that all business accounts are screened at the time of account opening by the staff person dealing with the member. Social and environmental risks of larger business banking loans (non-credit-scored loans) are assessed at the time of the loan application, guided by the Ethical Policy and Lending Policies.

This statement does not give the reader the information they need to understand the criteria used in assessing clients. However, statistics, such as that given by the Cooperative Bank (UK), stating that in 2003 they reviewed 225 potentially problematic financial opportunities and of these 20% were found to be in conflict with their ethical statements and were subsequently denied further business, costing the bank 6,887,000 pounds,^{Coro Strandberg 2005} give the consumer the impression that the banks’ proposed ethics, however ambiguous, have credibility.

Another issue in this category is that of codes of conduct. Many ethical banks, as well as conventional banks, voluntarily join larger bodies that put forth certain regulations that, according to the rules set by the body, should be followed by members. Such outside bodies could act as overarching institutions that could guarantee a certain level of conformance with certain regulations. An example of this in the United States is the Food and Drug Administration. Depositors who use ethical banks do not have this assurance because there is no external regulatory body that sets minimum acceptable legal standards.

In the second category, ethical banks face obstacles such as losing business and consumer support to conventional banks, and having to regulate above and beyond the present international legal systems.

According to Cowton, C. J., and P. Thompson, "banks that had signed the United Nations Environment Programme (UNEP) Statement, a voluntary industry code that promulgated environmental stewardship, transparency, and sustainable development, did not act significantly different than the non-signatories."^{Cowton & Tompson 2000} They concluded that, for codes to be more effective; regulators, monitors, and methods of enforcement need to be in place.^{Cowton & Tompson 2000} This problem is similar to the problems faced by the fair trade movement. Both the fair trade movement and ethical banks rely on people to pay extra for known ethical goods. There is a limit to how much more people will pay for that guarantee, after that point, further initiatives will undercut the banks income and therefore are likely to not be followed.

Losing business to banks that do not screen so strictly is a problem for ethical banks. Many times, ethical banks must work with much lower budgets because of this. Ethical banks exclusion of unethical borrowers often results in the borrowers going to other banks, this brings up the importance of industry wide regulations. One way of raising the industry wide regulations would be for citizens to apply pressure on banks. Without this rise, it is difficult to impede unethical businesses from finding a bank to finance their projects. A rise in regulations that deal with moral topics is not out of the question. The current industry wide codes, for example, prohibit the financing of illegal drug production. This reflects the prominent societal morals against such drugs.

Ethical banks cannot solely rely upon the legal system to determine whether or not a potential client has acted unethically or whether or not their future plans are unethical. This is because of the wide range of laws throughout the world. While a business may be lawful in the international setting, this does not mean that the laws were up to the moral standards in which the bank originates. For example, extensive pollution and labor laws that would not be considered lawful in many developed countries are allowed in many lesser-developed countries.

== Bank regulations and the free market ==
One argument against regulating banks is that the regulations would violate the proper functioning of the free market economy. Severyn T. Bruyn suggested that the extreme disconnection between market actions and morals was never the intent of the market economy's founding thinkers, specifically Adam Smith and that putting standards and regulations in place that rest on the basic morals of society should not conflict with the free market, but are actually an important part of the proper functioning of the free market.

Rudolf Steiner suggested that capitalism has the task of funding economic initiatives; capital should be directed into directions productive for society. He proposed that rather than prices being set through either the total control of government regulation, or the total lack of control of a free market, each industry could have self-regulating associations of producers, wholesale and retail businesses, and consumers. These associations would determine prices fair to all three groups. The state would not interfere with purely economic decisions but would be responsible for protecting human rights (this could include a minimum wage and safety in the workplace) and equality of its citizens' rights. (See Steiner's Threefold Social Order.)

== Differences from credit unions ==
Credit unions are not banks but they offer many of the same services as banks (e.g. investment opportunities, commercial and business loans, checking & savings accounts, etc.). Credit unions are member-owned rather than shareholder-owned. This gives each member equal vote in the decision-making process. When a credit union has surplus, the profits made will either be invested into the community or will go back to the members in the form of "patronage rebates" (i.e. cheques). Credit unions focus on the members because they are also the owners, and on the communities in which they are situated. Credit unions put a higher focus on local community development than banks do. Most credit unions lend strictly to people and businesses in the community where the union is located. This fact leads credit unions to affect communities more positively than regular banks.

However, credit unions do not necessarily have the same potential to cause widespread change in business practices as ethical banks do. This is because credit unions largely avoid the problem of funding unethical corporate/business activities by focusing on funding local businesses, which are easier to monitor and arguably less capable of generating wide-reaching social and environmental benefit.

== Alliances and networks ==
=== Global Alliance for Banking on Values ===
The Global Alliance for Banking on Values (GABV) is a membership organization founded in March 2009 by BRAC Bank in Bangladesh, GLS Bank in Germany, ShoreBank in the US, and Triodos Bank in the Netherlands. It is currently made up of 27 of the world’s leading sustainable banks, from Asia, Africa, Latin America to North America and Europe.

=== Fossil Free Banking Alliance ===
The Fossil Free Banking Alliance is an initiative launched by Bank.Green to identify and promote retail banks that refuse to do business with the fossil fuel industry. The alliance was established to fill the gap in the market for a centralized list of such banks. Currently the alliance is made up of retail banks such as: The Co-operative Bank, Beneficial State, Areti Bank and more. These banks have voluntarily undergone the Fossil Free Certified process, which involves submitting a signed declaration and evidence of their commitment avoiding the financing of fossil fuel companies or projects. The certification process is free of charge, and no bank can buy certification from the alliance. The Fossil Free Banking Alliance aims to help climate-conscious individuals discover the best bank for them, support banks in attracting like-minded employees, and raise awareness about the role of banks in financing the fossil fuel industry.

== See also ==
- Bankers' bank
- Carbon Disclosure Project
- Climate ethics
- Corporate social responsibility
- Equator Principles
- Socially responsible investing
- Sustainable finance
