= Joseph Catalanotti =

20th-century American labor leader

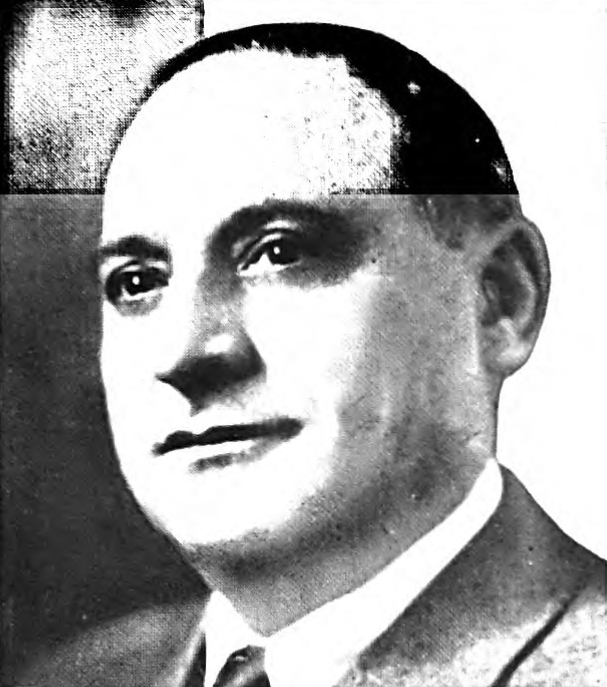
Joseph Catalanotti

Joseph Catalanotti (born Giuseppe Catalanotti; 1887–1946) was an Italian-American labor leader who co-founded the Amalgamated Clothing Workers of America union, served as one of its vice presidents, and also served as president of the Free Italy American Labor Council.

== Background ==
Joseph Catalanotti was born around 1887 in Castellammare del Golfo, Sicily, Italy. He had at least one sibling, a sister.

He apprenticed as a tailor in his home town before immigrating to America as a young man.

== Career ==
In 1913, Catalanotti took part in a large New York clothing strike and in 1914 helped form the ACWA. He rose from local business agent to trade manager to co-manager of the Amalgamated Clothing Workers Joint Board (representing 40,000 New York clothing workers) in 1932. By 1943, he was an ACWA executive vice president. His last task was to head the memorial committee for the main ACWA founder, Sidney Hillman, who had died of a heart attack only days earlier in July 1946.

On August 26, 1926, Catalanotti was a signatory with others in the North American AntiFascist Alliance of an "August Manifesto" against Fascism. Other signatories included: Luigi Antonini of the American Labor Party, Rose Schneiderman of the National Textile Workers Union, David Dubinsky of the ILGWU, Louis Waldman of the Socialist Party of America, and Sidney Hillman and Jacob Potofsky of the ACWA.

In 1943, Catalanotti left the Italian-American Labor Council to become president of the Free Italy American Labor Council (FIALC), which represented some 300,000 Italian-American trade union members. In December 1945, he traveled to Italy on behalf of the FIALC and the Congress of Industrial Organizations (CIO—of which the ACWA was a co-founding union) to assess how to rebuild Italy and then helped raise $500,000 among ACWA members for that cause. (The FIALC lasted until 1948.) Catalanotti was also a member of a war-time group called the National Committee for the Recognition of Italy.

== Personal life and death ==
Catalanotti married Elizabeth and had two children.

Joseph Catalanotti died age 59 at his Brooklyn home of a heart attack.

== Legacy ==
On the night of Catalanotti's death, the ACWA's new president, Jacob Potofsky, said that he would be "long remembered for his energy and idealism, his great love of humanity, and his leadership in the fight against fascism, both here and in his native land." New York State CIO president Louis Hollander, who had served on the Joint Board with Catalanotti, said he had "earned the respect and gratitude of all workers for his ceaseless efforts on behalf of a better America and a better world."

== See also ==
- Amalgamated Clothing Workers of America
- Sidney Hillman (ACWA president
- Jacob Potofsky (ACWA president after Hillman)
- Leo Krzycki (ACWA EVP and Polish American Labor Council president)
