= Frank Rosenblum =

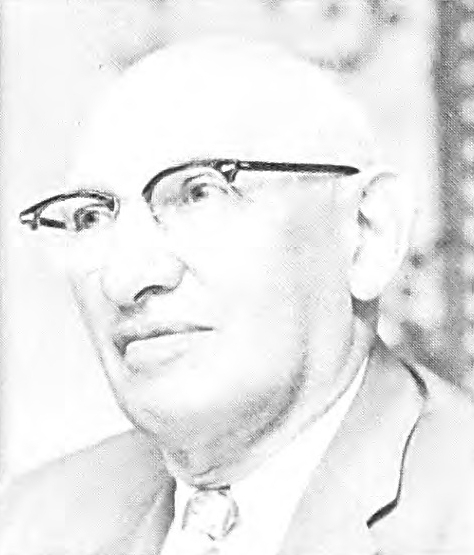
Rosenblum c. 1960

Frank Rosenblum (1888 – February 9, 1973) was an American labor unionist.

Rosenblum grew up in Philadelphia, where he worked as a cutter in the men's clothing industry. He moved to Chicago in 1908, and became active in the United Garment Workers of America. He was the secretary of the strike committee during the 1910 Chicago garment workers' strike, and was the first worker to be sacked from Hart Schaffner Marx during the action.

In 1914, the United Garment Workers barred more radical delegates from its convention. Rosenblum attempted to have the delegates seated, but gave up and led the majority of the union's members to found the new Amalgamated Clothing Workers of America. He organized new locals of the union across the Mid West. In 1940, he moved to New York City to become executive vice president of the union, then in 1946, he was elected as its secretary-treasurer. In this role, he focused on developing the union's social insurance program.

During the 1950s, Rosenblum was a vocal opponent of McCarthyism. He later opposed American involvement in the Vietnam War, and was active in the peace movement. He finally retired from his union post in 1972 and died the following year.

Trade union offices
Preceded by Jacob Potofsky	Secretary-Treasurer of the Amalgamated Clothing Workers of America; 1946–1972	Succeeded by Jack Sheinkman
