= Leo Krzycki =

Former Chairman of the Socialist Party of America (1881–1966)

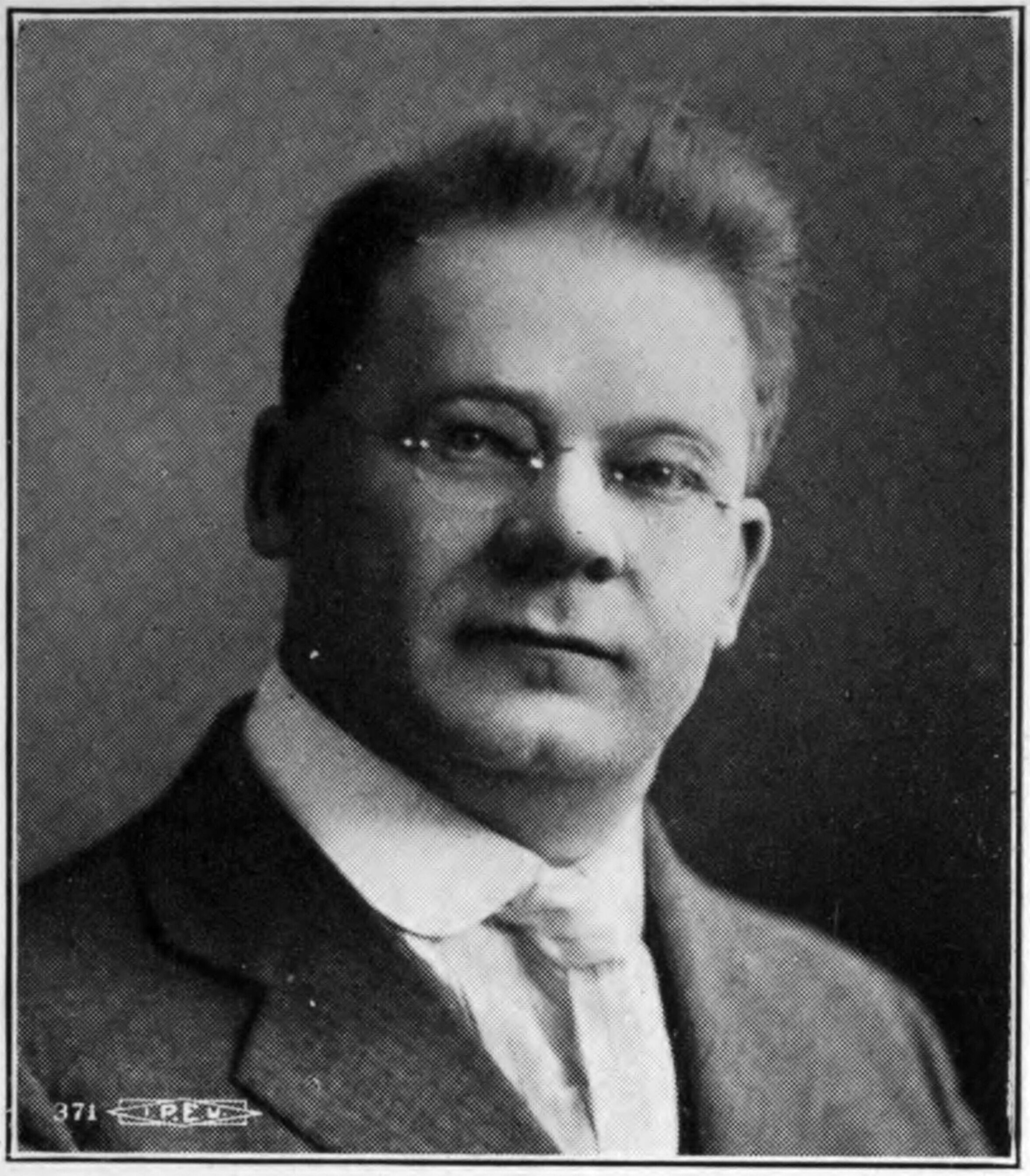
- Krzycki c. 1922

National Chairman of the Socialist Party of America
- In office October 29, 1933 – July 16, 1936
- Preceded by: Morris Hillquit
- Succeeded by: Norman Thomas

Vice President of the Amalgamated Clothing Workers of America
- In office 1920–1947

Member of the Milwaukee Common Council
- In office April 17, 1912 – April 18, 1916

Personal details
- Pronunciation: k-ZHIT-ski
- Born: Leo C. Krzycki; August 10, 1881 Milwaukee, Wisconsin, U.S.
- Died: January 22, 1966 (aged 84) Milwaukee, Wisconsin, U.S.
- Party: Socialist (before 1936); American Labor (after 1936)
- Spouse: Anna Kadau (m. 1909)
- Children: Leona; Eugene John; Victor Leo
- Parent(s): Martin Krzycki, Katherine Wobszal
- Occupation: Union leader, Socialist leader, activist
- Awards: Order of Polonia Restituta (1946)

Leo Krzycki (also known as Leon Krzycki in Polish; August 10, 1881 – January 22, 1966) was an American socialist and labor leader of Polish descent who served on the Milwaukee Common Council from 1912 to 1916, as vice president of the Amalgamated Clothing Workers of America from 1920 to 1947, and as national chairman of the Socialist Party of America from 1933 to 1936.

== Early life ==
Leo C. Krzycki was born on August 10, 1881, in Milwaukee, Wisconsin, to Martin Krzycki and Katherine Wobszal. He was involved with the labor movement from a young age, leading an unsuccessful lithographers' strike at 15 which left him blacklisted by the company. He spent the next several years working odd jobs and became radicalized, returning to Milwaukee and becoming vice president of the Lithographic Press Feeders Union in 1904.

== Political career ==
Krzycki was elected to the Milwaukee Common Council in 1912, serving four years before running unsuccessfully for city comptroller in 1916. Thereafter, he served as an undersheriff.

In 1918, Krzycki ran for Congress in Wisconsin's 8th congressional district, losing to incumbent Edward E. Browne. In 1924, he ran again in the 4th district, losing to incumbent John C. Schafer. He then ran for U.S. Senate in 1926, losing to John J. Blaine, and for Secretary of State of Wisconsin in 1928, losing to incumbent Theodore Dammann.

Krzycki was involved in the 1926 Passaic textile strike, and appeared in the silent film released the same year which dramatized the events surrounding the strike.

Krzycki served as secretary of the Socialist Party of Wisconsin. He was also a Wisconsin delegate at the 1932 Socialist National Convention, which was held in Milwaukee.

On October 29, 1933, Krzycki was elected chairman of the national executive board of the Socialist Party of America, succeeding the lately deceased Morris Hillquit. He held the post until 1936, when he left the party to join Sidney Hillman in the American Labor Party. His opponents in the Old Guard faction included Louis Waldman and Charles Rozmarek.

Krzycki's involvement in the 1937 Little Steel strike was criticized, especially regarding the "march" forward that the strikers took towards the plant gates. One first-hand account stated that he knew beforehand that the police captain was a "sadist" and stayed on-stage, trying in vain to dissuade the protests from going forward. Krzycki was also a key figure in organizing the 1937 strike against Ford Motor Company, and shares a historic image leading the strikers with labor leaders Richard Frankensteen and Ed Hall.

In April 1942, during World War II, Krzycki accepted the presidency of an American Slav Congress (ASC), allegedly as "front man" for Bolesław Gebert of the Soviet All Slav Congress that had been formed in October 1941 following the German attack on the Soviet Union. After Nazi Germany publicised the 1940 Katyn massacre of Polish prisoners by the Soviets in April 1943 as part of its war propaganda, Krzycki's ASC broke with the Polish government-in-exile in London and stood with the Soviet Union and the pro-Soviet Union of Polish Patriots (a precursor to the post-war, Soviet-backed Polish government). It supported the Soviet-proposed changes to Poland's borders to the west and east. Both the FBI and OSS (and then the CIA) followed ASC activities, which was later questioned before Congress, leading to Krzycki's resignation and the organization's dissolution by 1951.

In 1944, Krzycki, by then "a noted one-time socialist leader," also became president of the American Polish Labor Council (APLC), appended to the CIO PAC to support Franklin Delano Roosevelt's 1944 presidential campaign.

== Personal life and death ==
In 1909, Krzycki married Anna Kadau, a neighbor; they had three children. His daughter named her son after Norman Thomas.

Krzycki was a member of the American Committee for Protection of Foreign Born.

Leo Krzycki died age 84 on January 22, 1966, in Milwaukee.

== Awards ==
- 1946: Order of Polonia Restituta

== Works ==
- The Polish Worker's Day. New York, 1942.

== See also ==
- Amalgamated Clothing Workers of America
- Wisconsin Labor History Society
- Socialist Party of America
- Joseph Catalanotti (contemporary ACWA EVP)
