= Jack Gold (labor) =

Jack Gold was a 20th-century American union labor leader and political activist who served as manager of the manager of the Coatmakers Trade Board of Amalgamated Clothing Workers of America (ACWA) and was a founding board member of the Amalgamated Bank of New York.

For Amalgamated Clothing Workers of America (ACWA) (of which Amalgamated Bank co-founder Sidney Hillman was president), Gold served as the manager of the Coatmakers Trade Board, manager of the New York Joint Board of the ACWA, chairman of the ACWA committee for the United Labor party,

Fellow co-founders of the Amalgamated Bank included Sidney Hillman and Max Lowenthal.
