= Louis Hollander =

American labor leader (1893-1980)

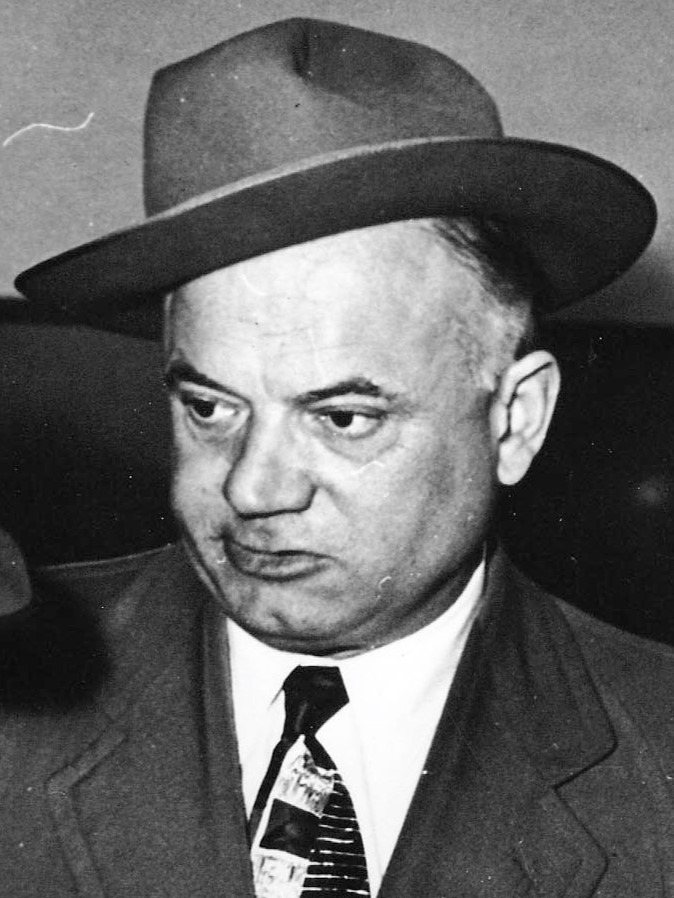
- Hollander c. 1940s

Vice President of the Amalgamated Clothing Workers of America
- In office 1936–1976

Member of the New York City Council from Brooklyn At-Large
- In office January 1, 1938 – December 31, 1939
- Preceded by: Constituency established
- Succeeded by: Multi-member district

Personal details
- Born: 1893 Wadowice, Russian Empire
- Died: January 3, 1980 (aged 87) New York City, New York
- Party: American Labor
- Occupation: Labor leader

Louis Hollander (1893–1980) was a labor union leader who co-founded the Amalgamated Clothing Workers of America union (ACW), the US portion of the World ORT, and the American Labor Party (ALP); served as state president of the Congress of Industrial Organizations (CIO), and held several executive roles on the AFL–CIO political action committee; in 1948 he joined the CIO mainstream to oppose the candidacy of Henry A. Wallace in favor of incumbent Harry S. Truman.

== Early life ==
Louis Hollander was born in Wadowice, Russian Empire (now Poland). At the age of ten, he immigrated with his family to the US and settled in New York. He did not finish his high school diploma until 1913 because he had gone to work early in life and had to work nights to complete that education.

== Career ==
At age thirteen, Hollander entered the clothing trade as a fitter and pants cutter. In 1913, before he turned 20, he became an organizer for the United Brotherhood of Tailors, affiliated with the United Garment Workers.

In 1914, Hollander left those unions to co-found the Amalgamated Clothing Workers of America union (ACW) and traveled in the US and Canada to expand its membership.

In 1922, Hollander helped Adolph Held found the US arm of the Organization for Rehabilitation through Training (ORT), now called the World ORT. In 1938, he co-founded the American Labor ORT.

In 1936, Hollander co-founded the American Labor Party (ALP) of New York State and in 1937 ran successfully for Brooklyn City councilman on an ALP ticket, after which he declined a second term to refocus on union business.

In the 1940s, Hollander worked on the New York State CIO and became its president in 1943. He supported New York Governor W. Averell Harriman but not Thomas E. Dewey, though Dewey did seek Hollander's advice on labor legislation. In 1946, he said of Joseph Catalanotti, fellow member of the New York State CIO board, that he had "earned the respect and gratitude of all workers for his ceaseless efforts on behalf of a better America and a better world."

In 1947, he stood with the CIO in opposing passage of the Taft–Hartley Act. On December 29, 1947, Hollander appeared before the Joint Committee on Housing of the Eightieth Congress (First Session) as head of the New York State CIO and read a prepared statement and testified regarding housing in the State of New York for what was then the "Taft–Ellender–Wagner Bill" and became the Housing Act of 1949. Like other union leaders, he shared his personal housing situation:

I live in a house of 102 tenants with little children ... in itself, a little town – 102 tenants in that house will be more than 1,000 people. And with the little children, a shortage of oil or any other heating material, we will still find some – Thursday, Friday, Saturday, Sunday – cold, icy, without any heat without any hot water. And I called up my wife just before I can here [and asked], "Will there be any heat today? Otherwise, I won't come home at all." She went down to the super. He said, there will not be any heat, but that is only because of the shortage of housing. Some of the owners know that the tenants can't help themselves; they must accept, because even the board of health would help out if the owner would be interested. I am bringing out this little incident that we are going through now to indicate to you the acuteness of the problem that we are £acing.

In 1948, he followed CIO president Philip Murray in an anti-communist stance (against the pro-CPUSA ALP, which he helped found) in rejecting former US Vice President Henry A. Wallace and his Progressive Party and sticking with incumbent US President Harry S. Truman. In July 1948, he publicly opposed Lee Pressman, who was the ALP candidate for U.S. Congress in the 14th District of New York (Brooklyn) against Abraham J. Multer.

In 1953, the ACWA and CIO celebrated the start of Hollander's eleventh term as manager of the New York joint board of the ACWA. They marked a triple anniversary: 40 years as ACWA executive, 20 years as chief spokesman for the ACWA in New York City, and 10 years as president of the New York State CIO. To mark the occasion, he gave an overview of "labor's evolution":

"It was an industrial jungle," Mr. Hollander recalls, "with no semblance of civilization. The worker had no security and it was crazy even to suggest that he had any rights. I started as an apprentice at $3 a week and even the most skilled tailors and cutters had to be satisfied with $9 to $15 a week."
The 1913 strike was a nightmare," in which the workers were reduced to baking potatoes in the stove at their union hall and depending on charity. The strike settlement provided for a basic work week for fifty-four hours and a $1 wage increase, but many employers ignored its terms. The New York workers demanded a reform in their parent union, which they held responsible for many of their difficulties. When they could not get the kind of changes they wanted, they joined with clothing workers from other areas in forming the Amalgamated. Mr. Hollander was designated its first international organizer.
Today the relations between the Amalgamated and the clothing manufacturers. have become so tranquil that the industry has not had a major strike here since the union struck against the "runaway" shop in 1932. Both sides proceed on the theory that the welfare of employers and workers are interdependent and that neither group.can prosper without the other.

In 1955, when the CIO merged back into the AFL to form the AFL–CIO, Hollander became New York State president of the AFL–CIO.

In 1976, Hollander retired from the ACW, where he had served as a vice president since 1936.

== Personal life and death ==
Hollander was married to Mollie.

In 1939, Hollander established a Louis Hollander Scholarship at Cornell University, which invited him to join its board of trustees in 1944. In 1951, he helped found a Sidney Hillman Health Center and served as its president. In 1970, he retired from the Cornell board.

Hollander supported formation of Israel in 1948 and asked that Marshall Plan include the new state in 1949.

Louis Hollander died age 87 on January 3, 1980, at The Workmen's Circle Home for the Aged in the Bronx.

== Recognition ==
- Page One Award of the Newspaper Guild of New York

== See also ==
- Amalgamated Clothing Workers of America
- World ORT
- American Labor Party
- Congress of Industrial Organizations
- AFL–CIO
- Sidney Hillman
- Joseph Catalanotti
- Adolph Held

== External sources ==
- Louis Hollander Papers at Cornell University's Kheel Center for Labor-Management
- Columbia University: Reminiscences of Louis Hollander : lecture, 1963
