= Joseph Schlossberg =

Belarusian-born Jewish-American labor activist

- יוסף שלאסבערג
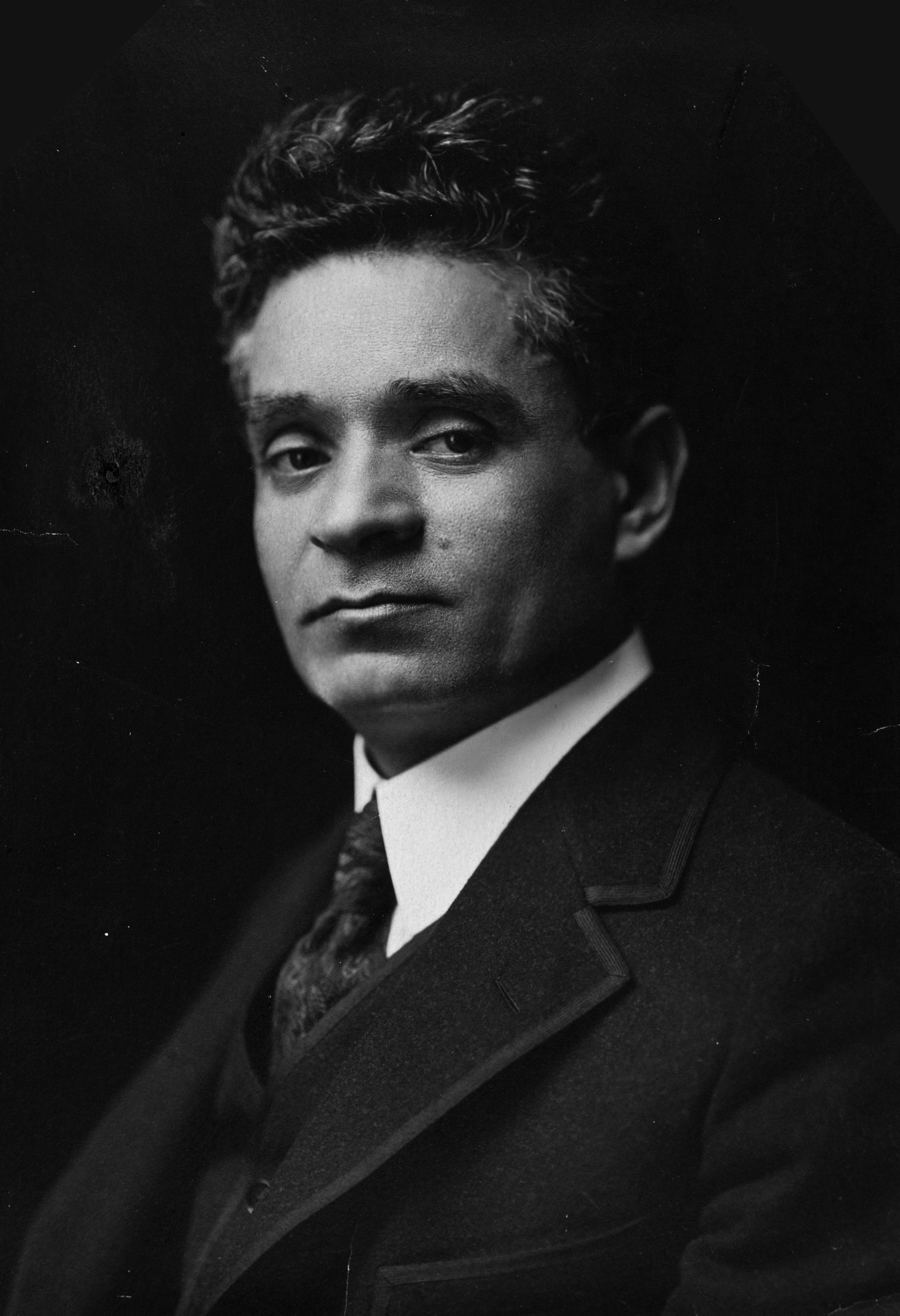
- Schlossberg in 1922

Secretary-Treasurer of the Amalgamated Clothing Workers of America
- In office October 14, 1914 – August 4, 1940
- Preceded by: Office established
- Succeeded by: Jacob Potofsky

Personal details
- Born: May 1, 1875 Koidanovo, Minsk Governorate, Russian Empire
- Died: January 15, 1971 (aged 95) New York City, New York, U.S.
- Resting place: Montefiore Cemetery
- Party: Socialist Labor (before 1938); American Labor (after 1938)
- Occupation: Garment worker, newspaper editor, labor leader, politician

Joseph Schlossberg (in Yiddish: יוסף שלאסבערג; May 1, 1875 – January 15, 1971) was a Belarusian-born Jewish-American garment worker, newspaper editor, labor leader, and politician who served as Secretary-Treasurer of the Amalgamated Clothing Workers of America from its foundation in 1914 until 1940.

== Life ==
Schlossberg was born on May 1, 1875, in Koidanovo, Minsk Governorate, Russia, the son of Max Schlossberg and Bessie Feldman. He immigrated to America and settled in New York City in 1888.

Schlossberg attended public school in New York City for a year. He went to the Columbia University School for Political Science from 1905 to 1907. The son of a tailor, he initially worked as a cloakmaker. He was editor of Dos Abend Blatt, a Yiddish daily, from 1900 to 1902. He edited Der Arbeiter, a Yiddish weekly from 1904 to 1911. In 1912, he edited the Yiddishe Wochenschrift with David Pinski. He also edited the English Advance and the Yiddish Fortschritt, the official publications of the Amalgamated Clothing Workers of America. He was one of the founders of that union in 1914, serving as its general secretary-treasurer.

In the 1904 United States House of Representatives election, Schlossberg was the Socialist Labor candidate in New York's 9th congressional district, losing to Democrat Henry M. Goldfogle. In 1908, he was the Socialist Labor candidate in the New York State Assembly's New York County 4th District, losing to Democrat Aaron J. Levy. Although he was not an original founder of the American Labor Party (he disagreed with its endorsement of a capitalist politician, Franklin D. Roosevelt), in 1938 he ran for Congress in New York's 19th congressional district on an American Labor-Socialist fusion ticket, losing to Democrat Sol Bloom. In 1935, Mayor Fiorello La Guardia appointed him to the City Board of Higher Education, sitting on the board until 1963.

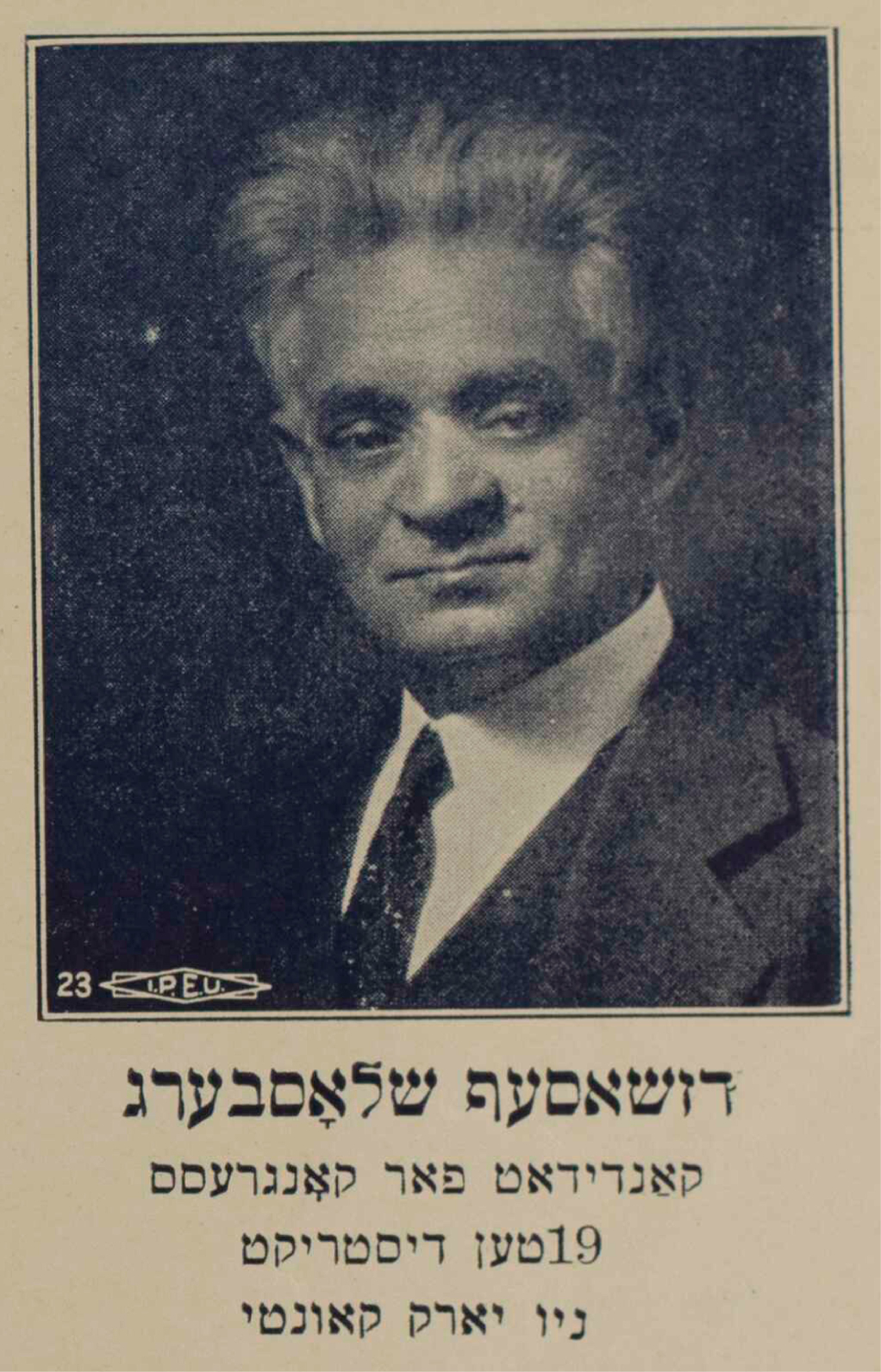
Schlossberg in 1938. "Joseph Schlossberg; Candidate for Congress; 19th District; New York County"

A member of the radical left wing of the American socialist movement, Schlossberg fought with Joseph Barondess over leadership of the garment workers and broke with Morris Hillquit, Meyer London, and Abraham Cahan over socialist policies and tactics. When the latter three left the Socialist Labor Party to form the more moderate Socialist Party, he remained with the original party and came to edit the party's weekly Der Arbeiter. In 1913, during a strike of New York City men's tailors, he supported the tailors against their parent organization, the United Garment Workers of America, who opposed the strike. In response, the tailors formed the Brotherhood of Tailors and elected Schlossberg secretary. His supporters seceded from the United Garment Workers in 1914 and formed the Amalgamated Clothing Workers. As its secretary-treasurer, he formed a successful 25-year team with president Sidney Hillman, administered its accounts, wrote books and pamphlets on the union's programs, and advocated social reform. He resigned from the office in 1940 to focus on community and Zionist affairs.

A long-time Zionist, Schlossberg was active in calling for the first Congress for Labor Palestine in New York in 1918. He was a charter member of the National Committee for Labor Israel and was elected its president in 1934. The Israeli labor federation, Histadrut, later established a cultural center in Ashkelon in his honor. A prolific writer on labor, he wrote articles for the Yiddish and English press for forty years and in 1935 published a collection of essays called "The Workers and Their World." He was a governor of the American Association for Jewish Education and a director of the American Civil Liberties Union, the Amalgamated Bank, the Yiddish Scientific Institute, HIAS, and the League for Industrial Democracy. He was a member of the national executive board of the Religion and Labor Federation.

Schlossberg was a member of the administrative committee of the World Zionist Congress and a member of the Workmen's Circle. In 1905, he married Anna Grossman. Their children were Matthias and Ruth. His daughter Ruth Landes was a professor of anthropology at McMaster University in Hamilton, Ontario, Canada.

Schlossberg died at home in the Bronx on January 15, 1971. He was buried in Montefiore Cemetery's Jewish National Workers Alliance burial society section.

Trade union offices
Preceded by Union founded	Secretary-Treasurer of the Amalgamated Clothing Workers Union; 1914–1940	Succeeded by Jacob Potofsky
