= Jacob Potofsky =

20th-century American labor union leader

Jacob S. Potofsky
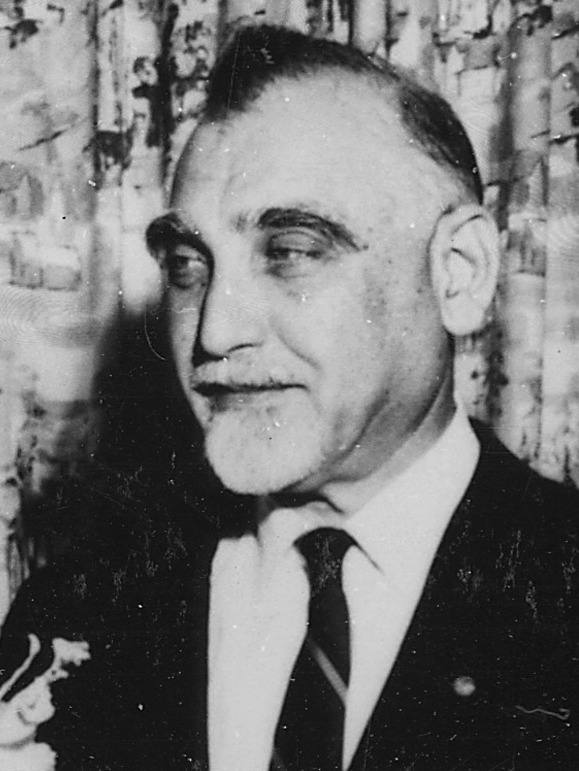
- Potofsky in 1957

President of the Amalgamated Clothing Workers of America
- In office July 10, 1946 – c. October 1972
- Preceded by: Sidney Hillman
- Succeeded by: Murray Finley

Secretary-Treasurer of the Amalgamated Clothing Workers of America
- In office August 4, 1940 – July 10, 1946
- Preceded by: Joseph Schlossberg
- Succeeded by: Frank Rosenblum

Personal details
- Born: Jacob Samuel Potofsky; November 26, 1894 Radomyshl, Russian Empire
- Died: August 5, 1979 (aged 84) New York City, United States
- Party: American Labor
- Spouse(s): Callie Taylor; Blance Lydia Zetland
- Children: 2
- Occupation: Labor leader
- Nickname: Jack

Jacob Samuel Potofsky (November 26, 1894 – August 5, 1979) was a Russian-born American trade unionist, best known as second president of the Amalgamated Clothing Workers of America, succeeding founder Sidney Hillman.

== Background ==
Jacob Samual Potofsky was born on November 26, 1894, in the Teteriv River town of Radomisl, Russian Empire (now Radomyshl, Ukraine). At age eleven, Potofsky immigrated with his family to Chicago, USA.

== Career ==
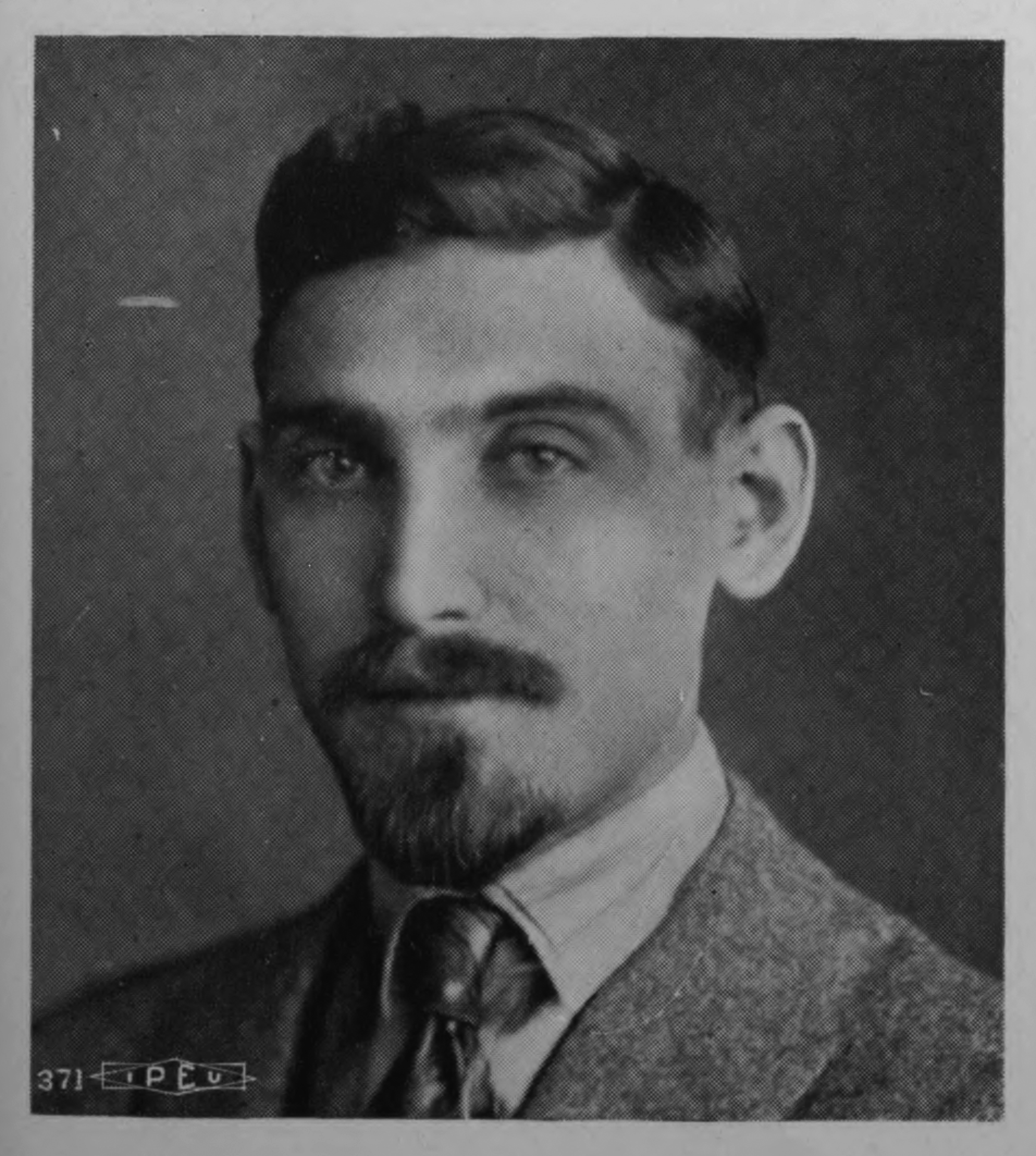
Potofsky c. 1922

Potofsky started working when he was 14 years old as a pocket maker. In 1910, by then a "floor boy" in a clothing factory for Hart, Schaffner & Marx, as a member of Pantsmakers Local 144 he partook in a strike called by Sidney Hillman against the clothing manufacturer. Soon after, Potofsky joined what became the Amalgamated Clothing Workers of America. In 1913, he became secretary-treasurer of the union's joint board in Chicago. In 1916, Hillman moved him to New York, where he became assistant general secretary of the union. In 1934, Potofsky became assistant president. In 1940, he became general secretary-treasurer when Joseph Schlossberg retired. In 1941, he strongly opposed the isolationist policy of John L. Lewis, president of the CIO and also the United Mine Workers (UMW).

In 1946, after 36 years of association, Potofsky succeeded Hillman as president of the Amalgamated Clothing Workers, when the union had 350,000 members and 96% of the men's clothing industry under union contract. He was active in the American Labor Party of New York State.

Potofsky was an influential figure in the labor history of the United States in his own right. In 1960, he supported John F. Kennedy for president; in 1968, he supported Hubert H. Humphrey for president. He held the post until 1972.

Potofsky was noted for his ability to reconcile differences within a union or between union and employer. He was, however, staunchly pro-labor, warning workers that "what you earn at the bargaining tables can be taken away in the legislative halls." His work landed him on the master list of Nixon political opponents.

== Personal life and death ==
Potofsky married twice, first to Callie Taylor (who died in 1946) and then to widow Blance Lydia Zetland; they had two daughters and a son. Daughter Delia married noted photographer and newspaper columnist William P. Gottlieb. Their son Bruce died of leukemia.

Jacob Samuel Potofsky died age 84 on August 5, 1979, in New York City of cancer.

== Legacy ==
Following his death, President Jimmy Carter issued a statement recognizing Potofsky as "one of the giants of the labor movement". The Amalgamated Clothing Workers of America hailed Potofsky, saying in a release that "The life and times of Mr. Potofsky are inextricably interwoven with the growth and stability of the American labor movement." ACW president Murray Finley and secretary-treasurer Jack Sheinkman stated, "Jack Potosfky's genius was motivating workers to face their own destinies. In his case, it was organizing workers to form unions, to bargain collectively, and to make group decisions for the common good."

== Works ==
- Autobiographical essay in American Spiritual Autobiographies: Fifteen Self-Portraits (1948)
- "The Pioneering of Workers' Banks" (1963)

Trade union offices
Preceded by Joseph Schlossberg	Secretary-Treasurer of the Amalgamated Clothing Workers Union; 1940–1946	Succeeded by Frank Rosenblum
Preceded by Sidney Hillman	President of the Amalgamated Clothing Workers Union; 1946–1972	Succeeded by Murray Finley
Preceded by Joseph D. Keenan; Walter P. Reuther	AFL-CIO delegate to the Trades Union Congress; 1958; With: George McGregor Harrison	Succeeded by Joseph A. Beirne; William C. Doherty
