= Amalgamated Clothing and Textile Workers Union =

North American trade union

ACTWU
- Successor: Union of Needletrades, Industrial and Textile Employees
- Founded: 1976
- Dissolved: 1995
- Merger of: Textile Workers Union of America; Amalgamated Clothing Workers of America
- Location: United States of America

The Amalgamated Clothing and Textile Workers Union (ACTWU) was a labor union representing workers in two related industries in the United States.

The union was founded in 1976, when the Textile Workers Union of America merged with the Amalgamated Clothing Workers of America. The small American Federation of Hosiery Workers also joined. On foundation, the new union had about 500,000 members. Like both its predecessors, it affiliated to the AFL–CIO. In 1979, the United Shoe Workers of America merged in, followed in 1983 by the United Hatters, Cap and Millinery Workers International Union.

The union successfully campaigned to unionize workers at J.P. Stevens & Co. However, the industry was in sharp decline in the United States, and by 1995, the union had only 129,000 members. That year, it merged with the International Ladies' Garment Workers' Union, to form the Union of Needletrades, Industrial and Textile Employees.

== Presidents ==
- 1976-1986 Murray Finley
- 1987-1995 Jack Sheinkman

== General Reference ==
- Amalgamated Clothing and Textile Workers Union (ACTWU), Hudson Valley Area Joint Board Records, 1919-1989. M.E. Grenander Department of Special Collections and Archives, University Libraries, University at Albany, State University of New York (hereafter referred to as the ACTWU Records).
