= Bessie Abramowitz Hillman =

American labor organizer

Bessie Hillman
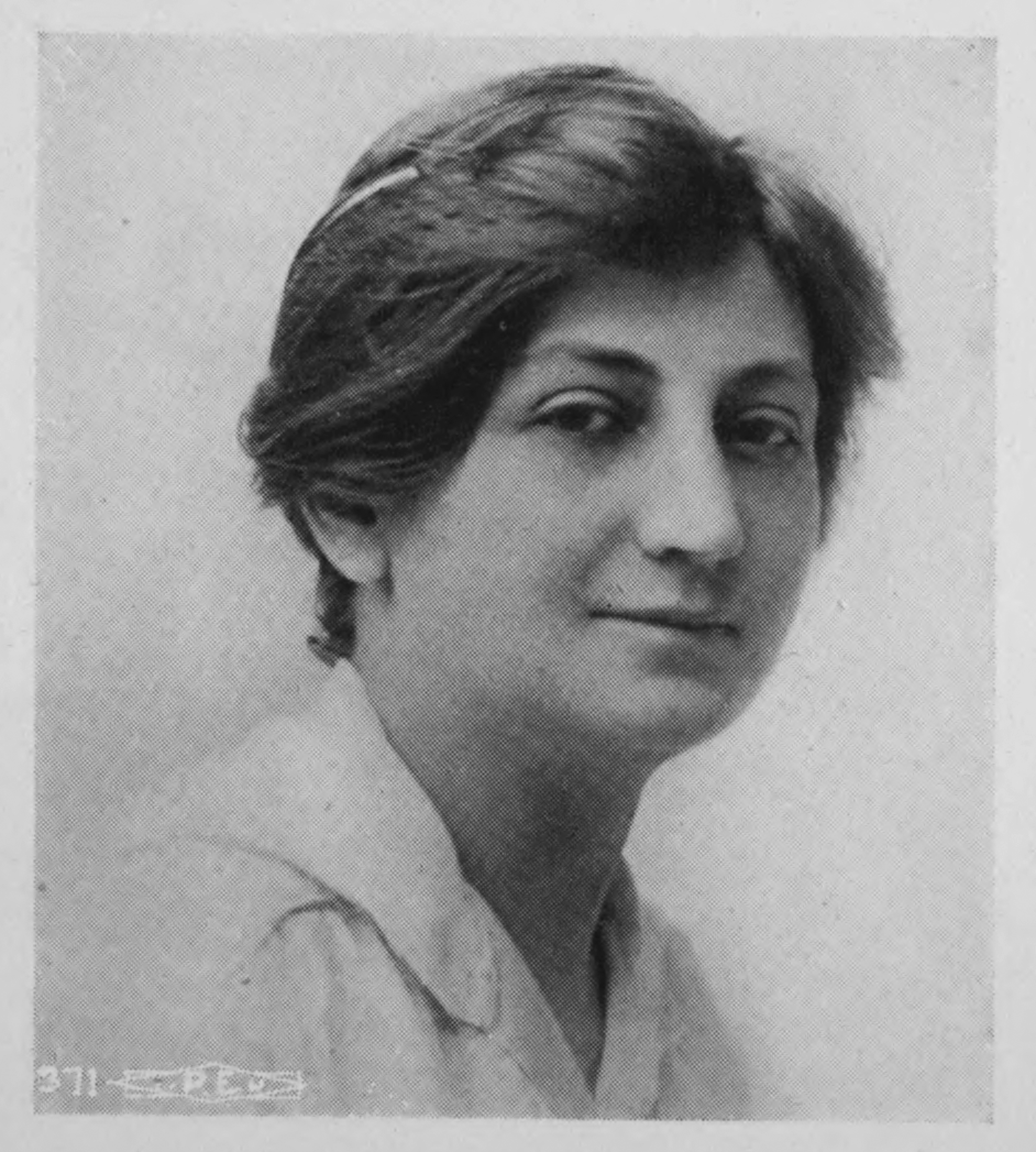
- Abramowitz c. 1922
- Born: Bas Sheva Abramowitz, באַס שבע אַבראַמאָוויץ; May 15, 1889; Linoveh, Grodno, Pale of Settlement, Russia
- Died: December 23, 1970 (aged 81); New York, New York, United States
- Occupations: Labor activist, union organizer
- Known for: Amalgamated Clothing Workers of America
- Spouse: Sidney Hillman
- Children: 2

Bessie Hillman (born Bas Sheva Abramowitz; באַס שבע אַבראַמאָוויץ, May 15, 1889 – December 23, 1970) was a labor activist and founder of the Amalgamated Clothing Workers of America. She led the 1910 Chicago Garment Workers' Strike, which brought about the creation of the Amalgamated Clothing Workers of America labor union in 1914.

== Background ==
Bas Sheva Abramowitz was born on May 15, 1889, in Linoveh, Grodno, Russia, part of the Pale of Settlement. The fourth child of ten, she spent her first fifteen years in Russia with her parents Emanuel Abramowitz, a commercial agent, and Sarah Rabinowitz, an innkeeper. Linoveh was a shtetl, and like many, it had a tightly-knit community. It was home to a number of charities, run by women, that worked to provide for orphans and the poor. Though Linoveh escaped much of the tsarist policies that were targeting Jews, it was surrounded by other Jewish communities that were suffering from discriminatory policies and pogroms. Abramowitz left this home at a young age to seek work elsewhere in Russia, returning after a period of a few months. In 1905, she immigrated to America with two of her cousins. Unlike many around her, she did not leave to escape oppression by Tsar Nicholas II or antisemitic violence, but rather to avoid arranged marriage. Her name was anglicized to "Bessie" by a customs officer upon her arrival.

== Career ==
=== Chicago ===
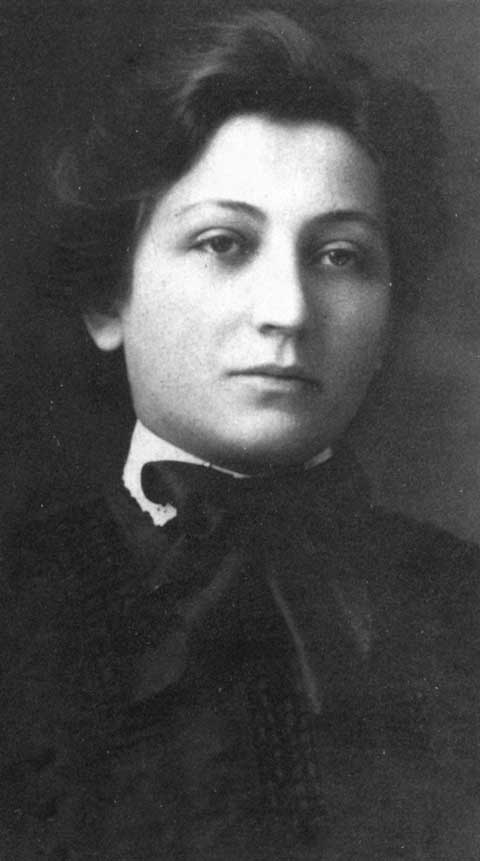
Abramowitz c. 1910

Arriving in the United States knowing only Yiddish and some Russian, Abramowitz moved into a boardinghouse owned by her relatives and began working at the Hart Schaffner & Marx garment factory as a button sewer. At night, she attended school at the Hull House, a settlement house for European immigrants. She used her salary to fund the immigration of two of her younger sisters in 1907, who moved into the boardinghouse and earned money making bow ties.

Abramowitz was fired from her job after organizing a protest among other workers to challenge poor working conditions and salary. Blacklisted by her employer, she used a pseudonym to regain employment at the same company. In September 1910, again in response to poor working conditions, Abramowitz led a group of sixteen women in a walkout. Although initially mocked by other workers, the walkout gained in strength. By the middle of October, most of the 8,000 Hart Schaffner & Marx employees had joined, as well as employees from other companies.

The movement gained the support and funding of the Women's Trade Union League, the Chicago Federation of Labor, and Jane Addams of the Hull House. Men eventually joined the strike, and it grew to almost 40,000 people, bringing the industry to a standstill.

In 1914, Abramowitz attended the national convention for the United Garment Workers of America as a delegate. Disagreements among its membership led Abramowitz to split off into the Amalgamated Clothing Workers of America, alongside Sidney Hillman, whom she would marry two years later in 1916. Hillman became the first president of the ACWA, and Abramowitz was elected to the General Executive Board.

=== New York ===
After her marriage in 1916 to Sidney Hillman, Bessie Abramowitz Hillman resigned from her role as business agent for the Chicago Local 152 to move with him to New York City. She resigned from the board of the ACWA, after agreeing with her husband that only one of them should earn a salary from the union. Her resignation did not mean the end of her work with the union, however; she continued to volunteer for the following thirty years. Between 1937 and 1939, Hillman worked to organize New York laundry workers, and was elected educational director for the Laundry Workers Joint Board.

Following her husband's death in 1946, Hillman was elected as a vice president for the ACWA. Although the union worked to support mostly-female workforce, Hillman was the only female leader of the union, and her title was ceremonial.

In 1961, Hillman was invited by Eleanor Roosevelt to join the Committee on Protective Labor Legislation as part of the Presidential Commission on the Status of Women. In this role, Hillman worked to pass legislation protecting female laborers.

== Personal life and death ==
During negotiations surrounding the 1910 strike, Abramowitz met Sidney Hillman, another worker at Hart Schaffner & Marx who was helping to lead the movement. Although they were secretly engaged in 1914, their careers and the expense caused them to delay the marriage. In 1916, Abramowitz and Hillman made their engagement public when they led a group of clothing workers in the May Day parade, arms linked. They married two days later and moved to New York City, where the Amalgamated Clothing Workers of America was headquartered. The couple had two daughters: Philoine in 1917, and Selma in 1921.

Bessie Abramowitz Hillman died in New York on December 23, 1970.

== See also ==
- Sidney Hillman
- Amalgamated Clothing Workers of America
- 1910 Chicago Garment Workers' Strike
