= Russian-American Industrial Corporation =

Economic development venture

Logo of the Russian-American Industrial Corporation

The Russian-American Industrial Corporation (RAIC) (Russian: Русско-американская индустриальная корпорация) was an international economic development venture launched in 1922 by the Amalgamated Clothing Workers of America in conjunction with the government of Soviet Russia. The corporation, mostly funded measure by small donations from sympathetic American union members, was conceived as a mechanism for the launch of new clothing factories to help alleviate the economic distress which had wracked the Soviet republic during the recently terminated era of Civil War and War Communism.

About $2 million was raised in the RAIC campaign, which was expended to launch or modernize 34 facilities, with the employment of 17,500 garment workers in Soviet Russia. Corporation stockholders received an interest payment of 5% annually until the program was terminated in 1925.

== History ==
=== Background ===
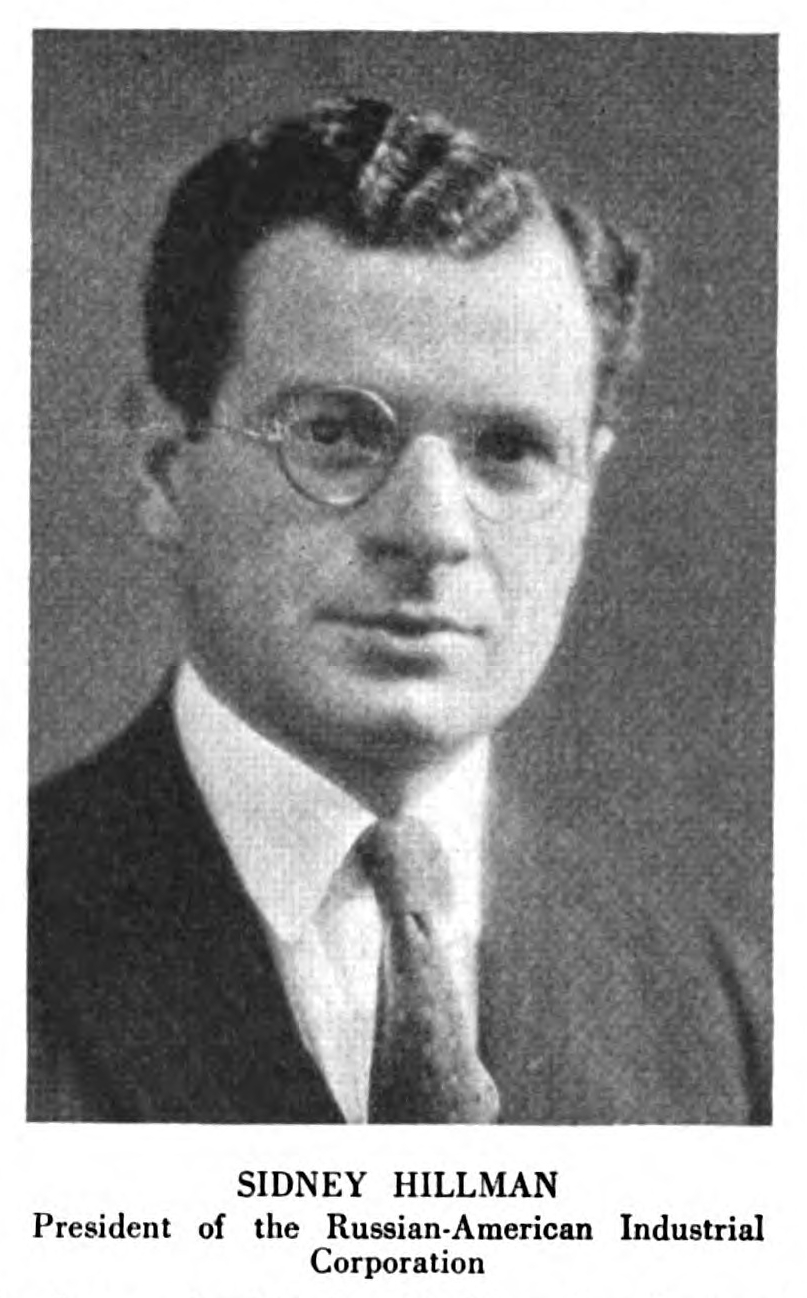
The RAIC was the brainchild of union leader Sidney Hillman, shown here in Soviet Russia Pictorial, February 1923

The Russian Revolution of 1917 and the bitter and bloody Civil War which followed left the economy of Soviet Russia shattered. Cities were depopulated as peasant-workers returned to the villages of their origin for a planned redistribution of land. Short of labor, raw materials, and organizational capability, factories were shuttered and industrial production plummeted. The Great Famine of 1921 swept the country, killing millions through starvation and disease. Through it all the governing Bolshevik Party stood firm as the world's first Socialist republic, offering a contrasting vision of a bountiful future that captured the imagination of wage workers around the world, motivating many to action.

In the United States many of those most anxious to help were those recent émigrés from the Russian Empire, including hundreds of thousands of Jews who had escaped the anti-Semitic regime in seeking a better life in the new world. Many of these worked in the American garment trades, manufacturing clothing and participating in a burgeoning New York City-based trade union movement in such unions as the Amalgamated Clothing Workers of America (ACWA) and the International Ladies' Garment Workers' Union (ILGWU). Not only was there pressure from the rank-and-file below to do something to aid the embattled Soviet regime, but many union officials were themselves radically minded immigrants to America who had departed Russia some years previously with a strong interest in lending aid to the so-called proletarian dictatorship in Soviet Russia.

Chief among these was Sidney Hillman, born in Žagarė, Lithuania (part of the Russian empire) in 1887. As a youth Hillman had become a Marxist and had actively worked for the revolutionary overthrow of Tsarism from 1903 as a member of the Bund and the Menshevik wing of the Russian Social Democratic Labor Party (RSDLP). It would be Hillman who would conceive of the institution known as the Russian-American Industrial Corporation as a mechanism to import garment-making machinery and organizational know-how to Soviet Russia in a tangible effort to aid the successful development of the Russian Revolution.

=== Formation ===
The idea to establish a corporation for the construction of clothing factories was born in the summer of 1921. Already in that year there was a model American-inspired industrial colony established in the Kuznetsk Basin of Western Siberia, the brainchild of émigré IWW activist William "Big Bill" Haywood and Dutch communist S. J. Rutgers. This input of American organizational know-how and technology had been credited with a tenfold rise in worker productivity in the Kemerovo coal mines, and had spurred the interest of Soviet government officials in replication of the program in other fields.

The idea for a similar joint effort in the Soviet textile industry emerged during the Russian leg of a European fact-finding mission of ACWA president Hillman. Hillman spent more than a month in Soviet Russia studying the difficult situation facing its textile industry. Shocked by the famine and disrepair, Hillman advocated the immediate appropriation of financial aid to Soviet Russia, believing that infusion of foreign capital would be required to restore the Russian industrial base.

Hillman proposed expanding the Kuzbas model, reorganizing and establishing a section of the industry in accordance with American practice and American technology. This proposal met with official approval, and two hours of negotiations with Soviet leader Vladimir Lenin ensued to finalize the particulars.

Hillman and Lenin signed a formal agreement, naming nine factories for the project — six in Petrograd (today's St. Petersburg), and three in Moscow — conditional upon the raising of $1 million for the project in the United States. The initiative was originally conceived as one which would eventually extend beyond the clothing industry into other divisions of Soviet industry, Hillman declared in an interview with the official state newspaper Izvestiia prior to his departure.

The matter was taken to the 5th National Convention of the Amalgamated Clothing Workers, held in Chicago in May 1922, and was ratified there. In a speech to union members, Hillman charged the Allied powers with engaging in a systematic campaign "to starve Russia into submission to the rule of international financiers" and argued that aid to Soviet Russia was not a matter of being for or against Bolshevism, but rather "for or against slaughter of millions of people." Hillman's report was warmly applauded and plans for the establishment of a new international development company fell rapidly into place.

Papers were filed in Delaware on June 2, 1922, to legally incorporate the new entity, to be known as the Russian-American Industrial Corporation (RAIC). Funds for the project were to be raised by having union members purchase capital stock in RAIC, priced at $10/share. Sales of stock were not packaged as a de facto donation but rather as an interest-bearing investment, the principal of which was to be insured by Lloyd's of London. An office for the project was maintained at 31 Union Square, Room 902, in New York City.

The RAIC project was endorsed by popular Socialist Party leader Eugene V. Debs, freed from prison six months earlier, who noted the low share price made it possible for workers "to invest according to his means in this most timely and laudable undertaking to contribute America's full share toward the reconstruction of Russia and the promotion of the highest human welfare throughout the world."

=== Development ===
Following approval of the RAIC program by the convention of the Amalgamated Clothing Workers, Hillman returned to Soviet Russia in the summer of 1922 to hammer out additional details of the enterprise. Contracts were negotiated with the chief economic planning organizations of the day, including an agreement with the Council of Labor and Defense (STO) authorizing RAIC to do business with various Soviet agencies and another with the Supreme Council for National Economy (Vesenkha) insuring the RAIC's contracts and pledging a dividend of 8% on invested funds if either the Soviets or the Americans sought to terminate the company after a three-year trial period.

The first investment by RAIC took the form of small machine parts and other machinery, with delivery beginning in August 1922. Despite promises to raise $1 million to fully finance the effort, American fundraising through sale of stock fell short of the mark, although an initial payment of $200,000 was made early in 1923.

RAIC's operations were governed by a nine-member Control Board, seven of whom were Soviets owing to the unequal financial commitment of the two parties to the enterprise. Day-to-day management of RAIC's manufacturing facilities was largely turned over to American skilled workers and experts, with the introduction of American production methods into backwards Russian industry being one of the primary appeals of the program from the perspective of the Soviet regime.

The nine initial factories provided to RAIC by the Soviet government were to be expanded to a network of fifteen facilities around the country under the terms of the contractual agreement. These factories were to produce a range of consumer commodities, including shirts, coats, suits, overcoats, underwear, caps, gloves, and other fabric goods. Factories were staffed both by Soviet and American workers, most of whom were returning émigrés from Tsarist Russia, numbering in the hundreds.

Investment eventually topped the $2 million mark with RAIC production ultimately expanded to 34 factories, employing 17,500 workers in total.

Dividends were twice paid to stockholders, an initial partial payment of 3% paid at the end of 1923, covering the first half year of productive operations, and a second payment of 5% in January 1925, covering the year 1924. News coverage of the latter payment asserted the total number of stockholders in RAIC to be 5,500.

=== Termination and legacy ===
The Soviet economy's recovery via the market-oriented New Economic Policy (NEP) alleviated the need for external capitalization of the consumer goods industry. RAIC was consequently terminated by the end of 1925. The company's impact during the first years of NEP had been significant, with its factories in eight cities reckoned to have produced more than twenty percent of total Soviet clothing output in those years.

In addition to a lessened Soviet need for foreign investment in consumer dry goods production, a contributing factor to the end of RAIC was economic necessity on the American side, with the coffers of the Amalgamated Clothing Workers and the personal finances of its members drained by a protracted tailoring strike in 1925.

RAIC provided a lasting impact by helping to regularize financial connections between the Industrial Bank of Moscow and two banks owned by the ACWA — the Amalgamated Trust and Savings Bank of Chicago and the Amalgamated Bank of New York. This relationship made possible the transfer of additional funds from workers in America to their family members in the Soviet Union, with more than $9 million being so transmitted by the start of 1925. This significantly eased the dire economic situation of Soviet citizens attempting to rebuild their lives amidst economic chaos.

== See also ==
- Amtorg Trading Corporation (Amtorg)
- All Russian Co-operative Society (Arcos)
