= Farah strike =

1970s labor strike in El Paso, Texas

The Farah strike (1972–1974) was a labor strike by the employees of Farah Manufacturing Company, a clothing company in El Paso, Texas and New Mexico. The strike started at the Farah plant in San Antonio in 1972 when the Mexican women, called Chicanas, led by Sylvia M. Trevino, at the company demanded a labor union formation to fight for better working conditions. The two-year long strike included 4,000 individuals, of which the majority were women.

William Farah was the CEO of the company. The company's workforce consisted of mostly Mexican women. In 1967, the company went public and employed around 7,000 people. In 1972, it had expanded globally employing 9,500 people, making it the second largest employer in Texas. The company expected high production rates from its employees despite low wages and poor working conditions. This led to the beginning of the strike. Workers supporting the strike were penalized and risked their jobs.

Amalgamated Clothing Workers of America (ACWA) was the mediator of the strike and within a month after the strike begun, they launched a national boycott of the products of Farah Manufacturing Company.

The strike was culminated in 1974 in the favor of the women workers. The women employees benefitted from the strike as some women were then actively involved in political organizations fighting for women's rights and fair and safe labor environments.

== Farah Manufacturing Company ==
The Farah Manufacturing Company, owned by Willie Farah, was the "largest manufacturer of men's and boy's pants in the United States." The company had a total of eleven plants all based in San Antonio, El Paso, Victoria, and New Mexico with a total of 10,400 employees pre-strike. Five of the plants were located in El Paso, making it the largest employer in the city. The El Paso–based plants were also the largest private employer and was almost entirely unorganized. The El Paso plant, central part of the strike, was seven-tenths of a mile long with a capacity to hold up to 5,000 employees.

== Reasons for the Farah strike ==
Amalgamated Clothing Workers of America (ACWA) is the union that represented the Farah strikers. A majority of the strikers were Chicanas, or Mexican American women. Although ACWA has been known to portray images of men as the face of the movement, "majority of the workers at Farah and on striker were women... many of them were single female parents with children." Many of the mothers on strike had to bring their children to the picket lines. At first, ACWA kept the women strikers "limited to picketing and clerking tasks, while men made public statements." The Chicanas challenged ACWA's lack of gender neutrality and formed their own group to display their solidarity and talents, Unidad Para Siempre (Unity Forever), where they were able to utilize their techniques when they "organized speaking and television engagements, facilitated resources to supporters, and developed a strike fund directed from a local church." This was a way for Chicanas to create a voice and claim space for women during the strike.

=== Job security ===
One of the reasons for the Chicana-led strike was lack of job security and Farah Manufacturing Co.'s lack of union support. Other factors that contributed to the strike were: no benefits for workers, gender prejudices, low wages, raises based on favoritism, health and safety hazards, and unattainable quotas.

Alice Saenz, a Farah picketer, voiced her experience with Farah's effortless employment termination when she stated, "the main reason we need a union is for job security." Another striker that was fighting against lack of job security was Armando, and he joined the picket line because he had eight children and was uncomfortable with not knowing if he would be fired for minor reasons. He stated, "For me it was job security, I saw a lot of people fired for no reason. Every day you have to think maybe this day I'll be fired because something else happens."

=== Lack of benefits ===
Lack of benefits was another element for the strike. Although Farah Manufacturing Co. provided their workers with a clinic inside the plant and retirement plan, several of the striker's experiences with Farah's benefits were unacceptable and discriminatory. According to a pamphlet by The San Francisco Bay Area Farah Strike Support Committee, which provided a platform for the narrative of the strikers, "the clinic at Farah is supplied with birth control pills for the women employees, who are indirectly asked to take them. Farah's attitude is why should they be delivering babies when they can be delivering pants at this factory." If an employee is ill, the company did not allow the employees to go home, instead, they were instructed to "take a number and go back to work and listen for your number to be called to see the company doctor...you don't get paid for the time you are in the clinic. He [the company doctor] gives you some pills and you are back to work again, so the company doesn't lose any production." Many illnesses went misdiagnosed by the company doctor.

As far as the retirement plan provided by Farah, several of the employees witnessed workers being terminated or forced to quit as they reached retirement age. In its 53 years of operation, pre-strike, no Farah workers were granted retirement. According to a striker, "With one older woman, Farah's speed-up wasn't driving her out fast enough so he had a supervisor standing over her every day until she couldn't take it anymore. She was forced to sign a form saying she quit on her own," even though the uncomfortable working conditions forced her out.

Another factor was the lack of maternity benefits. If the pregnant employee were to take time off after giving birth, she was not guaranteed her job upon arrival, she lost all seniority, and her pay would start back at new-hire wages. Due to these factors, "many of the women have to wait until the last week or two to take leave... several women have even had their babies at the plant!" These conditions were unacceptable and discriminatory for the female workers, and that was motivation for them to join the strike.

=== Discriminatory treatment ===
Gender prejudices were prevalent in the Farah Manufacturing Co. plants, and women were particularly discriminated against. Many of the women at Farah were either exclusive supporters of their household, or their family depended on their income to make ends meet. The North American Congress on Latin America stated, "women with several years on the job were still being paid minimum wage... women who were willing to date their Anglo supervisors were given preferential treatment, while others were subjected to constant harassment. 'The supervisors would snap their fingers at you, bang the machine and push you'." Due to the gender-biased environment in the workplace, Chicanas decided to join the strike and fight for better working conditions.

Wages for Farah employees were below the 1970s national average income, "most Farah employees (sewing-machine operators, etc.) are paid just above the federal minimum wage limit of $1.60 an hour compared to the $2.50 national average." The average take-home pay for the Farah employees was $69 per week ($3,588 per year) which forced whole families to work at the Farah plant in order to survive. The wages given to Farah employees were substantially below the 1970s national poverty line. According to the National Census, the poverty line, around the time of the strike, for an average family of four was $3,968 per year, and Farah employees were, on average, bringing home $3,588 per year.

=== Health and safety ===
Safety and health hazards around the plant was another element in striking for better working conditions. "Health problems in the plant were numerous. Some workers contracted bronchitis from working directly under huge air conditioners, while others suffered from lack of ventilation." The pressure of production played a factor in the amount of illnesses on the plant floor, "many women became ill, because they were reluctant to take time to go to the restroom or to get a drink of water."

=== Unrealistic standards ===
Unattainable, difficult-to-meet quotas were the norm at Farah. One Chicana striker, Miss Munoz, shared her experiences pertaining to the quota system, "She had to ask for a raise having been at the same pay level for three years. She was told that unless she could raise her daily production quota and keep it there, she couldn't have a raise. She started working at Farah as a belt setter at $1.30 an hour with a quota of 18 bundles a day – a dozen pairs of pants to a bundle. When she went on strike she was being asked to do 125 bundles a day, 125 dozen pairs of pants." Farah's supervisors would set unattainable quotas for his employees, and if they were not met, he would threaten their employment or reject pay raises.

== The strike ==
The Farah strike was a major garment dispute that was originated and led by majority Chicanas. The strike lasted twenty-two months and took place between 1972 and 1974, predominately in El Paso, Texas.

In May 1972, four thousand garment workers walked out of the Farah Manufacturing Company facility, with over 85% of the strikers being Chicanas and Mexicanas. They walked out of the Farah plant as a result of their demands to be represented by Amalgamated Clothing and Textile Worker's Union (ACWA) and have some measure of control over their daily working conditions. As strikers were outside the plant picketing, Farah supervisors were present at the rally to take pictures and names of the workers they were able to identify, and the following day the workers were fired due to their participation in the strike. Willie Farah, "paid low wages, pressured his employees to work faster and faster, consistently ignored health and safety conditions, and swiftly fired all those who complained." This placed an immense amount of pressure on the factory workers, because they had a daily fear of being fired without cause or mediation.

To the union organization, ACWA, if they were to represent the employees and force the mogul of factory owners, Willie Farah, into union contracts, they would be able to tackle several more factories around the nation. The president of ACWA, Anthony Sanchez, assured reporters that, "if they can crack Farah, they can organize anywhere in the country. He's the big one. The tough one. And that's what they're after." So, Sanchez and ACWA were willing to use their union's resources to help the Farah protesters succeed in this battle.

According to an article published in Corpus Christi Caller-Times newspaper, the reporter explained how Chicana strikers not only had support from ACWA, but they were staining national backing, including Senator Edward Kennedy, The United Farm Workers' Union, New York's Governor John O. Rockefeller, Los Angeles Mayor, Tom Bradley, and several other national figures. The National Organization for Women (N.O.W), an organization that has been widely criticized for its lack of inclusion of intersectional feminism, also supported the Farah strikers. El Chicano newspaper interviewed N.O.W's coordinator, Arlie Scott, and asked her why her organization supported this powerful movement, and her response was, "because it represents that positive action and personal courage required in the struggle to improve economic status of women and minorities." Scott also stated that the Farah Strike is a "fight for all women," to bring women out of the shadows, out of poverty, and out of oppression.

Once the strike took off, ACWA created The Farah Distress Fund, which allowed the community to contribute directly to the 4,000 strikers and their families. The strikers began obtaining support from other unions, La Raza groups, students, clergy, and people from around the nation.

A national boycott of Farah pants launched which was critical for their cause, because it would eventually force pressure on Willie Farah to adopt ACWA's union and better the working conditions of all his employees.

=== Willie Farah's reaction to the strike ===
A couple of weeks after the Farah Strike broke out, Willie Farah obtained a court injunction that stated, "people picketing had to be 50 feet apart." This injunction was based on the 1880 Texas law. Picketers were being arrested for protesting Farah's company and being fined $4, which was a substantial amount of money to be forced to pay while not receiving wages. 800–1,000 strikers, mostly women, were arrested, some during midnight raids of their homes. The 1880 Texas law did not hold-up in court, and was later ruled as unconstitutional due to the United States's first amendment's protection of peaceful assembly.

Willie Farah was on the board of directors at the First National Bank of El Paso and utilized his power to "cut off all loans to strikers," which was another strategy to stop protesters.

Fortress Farah was the name given to another Farah-scheme to end the strike, "The plants were surrounded with barbed wire and telescopic cameras. Plant guards were issued guns and unmuzzled attack dogs."

=== Reaction of the local El Paso community ===
The reaction from local El Paso residents was favored towards Willie Farah. El Paso newspapers provided Farah with a positive platform, and completely silenced and villainized the striker's voices. El Chicano focused on Willie Farah's reaction, who referred to the women as "filth" and "unreasonable." In that same article, the coordinator of N.O.W responded by saying, "when 'unreasonable' is the word used by one class, they use it when they want to subjugate another."

In Vicki Ruiz's book, From Out of the Shadows: Mexican American Women in Twentieth-Century America, she wrote that one of the Farah strikers stated, "We thought when we went out on strike that our only enemy was Farah... but we fount out it was also the press, the police, the businessmen..." Not only were the strikers facing repercussions from The Farah Manufacturing Co., Willie Farah, and Farah supervisors, but they were also facing backlash from the members of their local community of El Paso. It wasn't until the Farah Strike began obtaining national backing, support, and recognition that the El Paso natives began siding with the strikers.

== Aftermath ==
The strike ended in January 1974 in-favor of the strikers. Willie Farah adopted a union contract including: job security, arbitrable quotas, a grievance system, a company-paid health plan, recognition of the ACWA union, and rehire of the strikers. With the negative press surrounding Farah Manufacturing Company, and the period of economic stagnation in the United States, Farah's company began to declining. As a result of the national boycott of Farah pants, their sales declined from $150 million in 1972 to $126 million in 1974; retailers began taking Farah slacks off their racks to help support the cause and show their disapproval of Farah's business methods.

The Texas State Historical Association stated, "a national recession and company mistakes in production and marketing left Farah in a serious financial predicament. Layoffs, plant closures, and high turnover of the work force followed, thus inhibiting the growth of a strong union."

Texas Monthly described the Farah Strike as the "strike of the century." The reporter wrote, "By the time the work stoppage ended, March 1974, both sides suffered; The union had spent $8 million (~$39.5 million in 2024), and the company's image was irreparably damaged."

Farah Manufacturing's stock market value in 1972 was $39.50, and by 1974 it plunged to $8.00. This was primarily due to the negative media attention caused by the Farah Strike.

Today, Farah Manufacturing has taken-on several different names, including Cliff Mark, Beau Mark, Golden Scroll, Passport, Club 20, Par Excellent, Su Par Jeans, Daire, Kinrod, Classic Twenties, and K-Mart.
