= 1910 Chicago garment workers' strike =

Labor dispute in the United States

1910 Chicago garment workers' strike (Hart, Schaffner, and Marx strike)
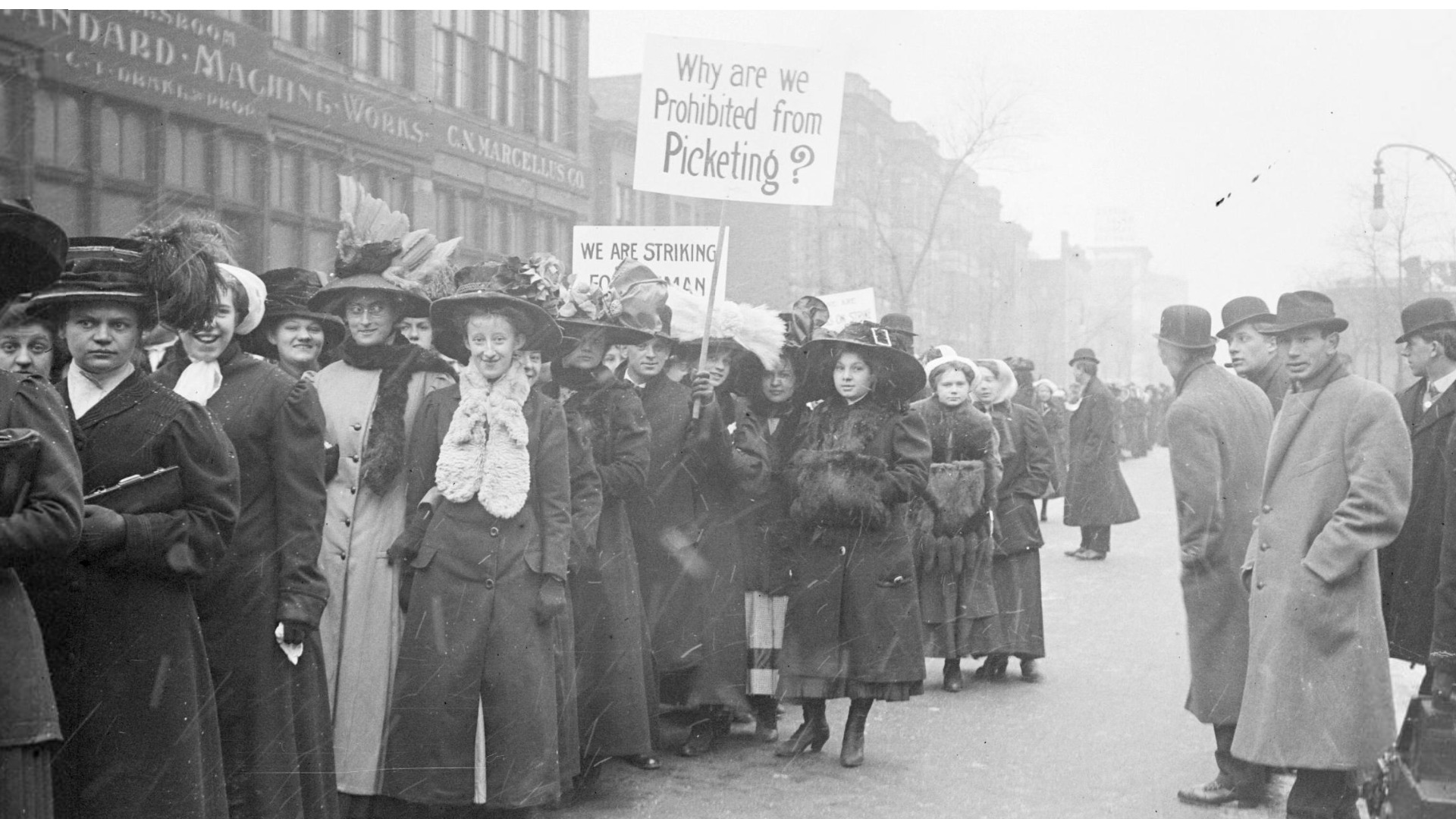
- Date: September 22, 1910 – February 18, 1911
- Location: Chicago, Illinois
- Result: Codification in 1911 improved standards within the labor workers standards. The emergence of the Amalgamated Clothing Workers of America

Parties
United Garment Workers	Hart, Schaffner and Marx

Lead figures
Bessie Abramowitz; Sidney Hillman	

The 1910 Chicago garment workers' strike, also known as the Hart, Schaffner and Marx (HSM) strike, was a labor strike established and led by women in which diverse workers in the garment industry showed their capability to unify across ethnic boundaries in response to an industry's low wages, unrealistic production demands, and poor working conditions. The strike began on September 22, led by 17-year old Hannah Shapiro, with sixteen women protesting the establishment of a bonus system that demanded high production rates, while also cutting in the piece rate by ¼ cent. Eventually up to 41,000 workers walked out at the peak of the strike. The strike was initially supported by the United Garment Workers (UGW), however the UGW withdrew its support in December over issues of settlement and the strike came to a halt when a deal was agreed upon between the labor leader Sidney Hillman (who later married strike leader Bessie Abramovitch) and HSM in January 1911. Although the most militant strikers held out until February 18, the strike succeeded in getting Rate Committee mandated contracts that presented workers with improved wages and conditions.

== Background ==
From 1880 - 1920, there had been a significant amount of labor strikes as the conditions, treatment, and wages of workers did not equal the amount of time and quality of work the average laborer dedicated. The rise of the garment industry in this time period was particular relevant to women, as by the end of the first decade of the 20th century, the garment industry was Chicago's third-largest employer and the single largest employer of women. The 1910 Chicago Garment Workers' Strike was preceded by similar garment labor strikes in different locations, such as the Uprising of the 20,000 in New York City, and subsequent strikes in Cleveland and Philadelphia. Fair treatment was desired by women as they did an equal amount of work compared to men, yet men oftentimes received a higher pay rate and/or concealed benefits.

== Strike ==
The strike began on September 22, 1910, when sixteen women, led by Hannah Shapiro, protested the Hart, Schaffner, Marx firm due to a biased bonus system and a cut in the piece rate. The strike grew rapidly and tremendously by the end of the first week as 2,000 women had joined the effort. The peak of the strikers came when the strike was sanctioned by the UGW with 41,000 workers walking off the job. Even though, the UGW supported the strikers, its support was not sufficient as the UGW did not call a general strike but relied upon the workers that did not have contracts and the HSM was able to counter the strikers by providing work to non-union subcontractors. This resulted in the strike losing an edge on the HSM and subsequently the strike began to decline. The UGW backed out of support in December 1910 as the Chicago Federation of Labor and the Women's Trade Union League (WTUL) encouraged that the strikers reach a deal. A deal was reached when the labor leader Sidney Hillman collaborated with the HSM firm. After a bitter, four-month strike, Hillman was instrumental in convincing the HSM to accept most worker demands, including recognition of newly formed Local 39 of the UGW, and an agreement to settle some future disputes by arbitration.

== Outcome ==
The strike was partially successful: workers received important support and attention that led to a re-codification of rules that were part of the deal. This deal also led to other codifications in 1913 and 1916. Also, the strike marked the start of what became the Amalgamated Clothing Workers of America and began the careers of strikers Bessie Abramovitz and Sidney Hillman (later to marry) as prominent labor leaders.

The strike claimed five lives. The first was striker Charles Lazinskas, killed by a private detective on December 3, and Frank Nagreckis was shot and killed while picketing on the 15th. Then between December 24 and January 3, eighteen-year-old non-union worker John Donnelly was shot to death by three unknown men, bystander Ferninand Weiss was shot and killed by a private detective, and a company guard named Fred Reinhart was killed by strikers in an ambush.
