= Murray Finley =

American labor union leader and lawyer (1922–1995)

Murray Howard Finley (March 31, 1922 – July 31, 1995) was an American labor union leader and lawyer.

Born in Syracuse, New York, Finley attended the University of Michigan in the early 1940s. While there, he worked in an automobile plant, joining the United Automobile Workers. He served in the military during World War II, then studied law at Northwestern University. After graduating, he became an assistant attorney for the Amalgamated Clothing Workers Union, based in Detroit.

In 1961, Finley was elected as manager of the Chicago Joint Board, in which role he launched college scholarships for the children of union members. He also founded the United Dwellings Foundation, to build housing for workers on low incomes. In his spare time, he served on the Chicago Public Library Board, on which he campaigned for a new library building, incorporating affordable housing, and a scheme to get college students to read to local children.

In 1972, Finley was elected as the president of the union. He led a campaign for Farah to recognize the union, and arranged a merger with the rival Textile Workers Union of America (TWUA), forming the Amalgamated Clothing and Textile Workers Union, of which he became the first president. He took up an existing TWUA campaign to unionize J.P. Stevens, which was successful. He was also co-chair of the Full Employment Action Council, and a leader of the campaign to make Martin Luther King Jr. Day a national holiday.

Finley retired in 1986, moving to Ann Arbor. He died in 1995.

Trade union offices
Preceded by Jacob Potofsky	President of the Amalgamated Clothing Workers Union; 1972–1976	Succeeded by Union merged
Preceded by Union founded	President of the Amalgamated Clothing and Textile Workers Union; 1976–1986	Succeeded by Jack Sheinkman
