= Amalgamated Clothing Workers of America =

Former American trade union

ACWA
- Amalgamated Clothing Workers of America
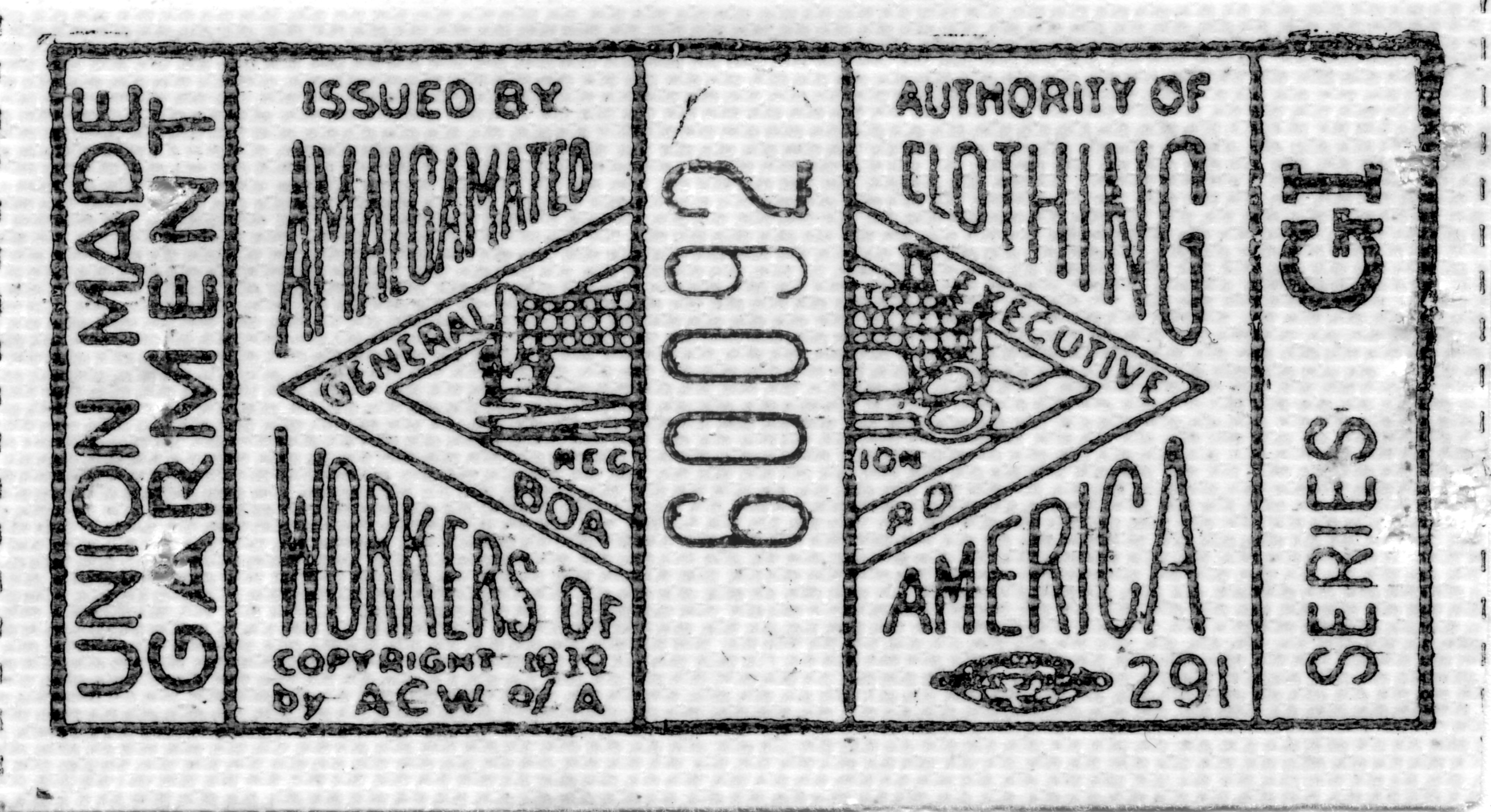
- Union Label, 1919
- Union merger: Amalgamated Clothing and Textile Workers Union
- Successor: Union of Needletrades, Industrial and Textile Employees, UNITE HERE, Workers United
- Founded: 1914
- Dissolved: 1976
- Location: United States
- Key people: Sidney Hillman
- Affiliations: AFL, CIO, AFL–CIO

Amalgamated Clothing Workers of America (ACWA) was a United States labor union known for its support for "social unionism" and progressive political causes. Led by Sidney Hillman for its first thirty years, it helped found the Congress of Industrial Organizations. It merged with the Textile Workers Union of America (TWUA) in 1976 to form the Amalgamated Clothing and Textile Workers Union (ACTWU), which merged with the International Ladies' Garment Workers' Union in 1995 to create the Union of Needletrades, Industrial and Textile Employees (UNITE). UNITE merged in 2004 with the Hotel Employees and Restaurant Employees Union (HERE) in 2004 to create a new union known as UNITE HERE. After a bitter internal dispute in 2009, the majority of the UNITE side of the union, along with some of the disgruntled HERE locals left UNITE HERE, and formed a new union named Workers United, led by former UNITE president Bruce Raynor.

== Founding ==
In 1914, the Amalgamated Clothing Workers of America—also known as "ACWA" or simply "the Amalgamated"—formed as a result of the revolt of the urban locals against the conservative AFL affiliate the United Garment Workers. The roots of this conflict date to the 1910 Chicago garment workers' strike, when a spontaneous strike by a handful of women workers led to a citywide strike of 41,000 garment workers. The bitter strike pitted the strikers against not only their employers and the local authorities, but also their own union.

The leadership of the United Garment Workers mistrusted the more militant local leadership in Chicago and in other large urban locales, which had strong Socialist loyalties. When it tried to disenfranchise those locals' members at the UGW's 1914 convention, those locals, representing two thirds of the union's membership, bolted to form the Amalgamated Clothing Workers of America. The AFL refused to recognize the new union and the UGW regularly raided it, furnishing strikebreakers and signing contracts with struck employers, in the years to come.

The Amalgamated's battles with the UGW's leadership also soured the union's relations with Abraham Cahan and the Daily Forward, which Cahan edited. During the 1913 strike by the United Brotherhood of Tailors in New York City, Cahan and the United Hebrew Trades had taken sides with the UGW leadership against the strikers by endorsing a settlement that the strikers rejected. The same split surfaced again the following year when the Forward and members of the Socialist Party who had a stake in the AFL supported the new union, but only tepidly, when it split from the UGW and the AFL. While the Forward played a direct role in the internal politics of the other major garment union, the International Ladies' Garment Workers' Union (ILGWU, or ILG), in years to come, it had far less influence over the ACWA.

== Growth ==
1918 pamphlet promoting the State Assembly candidacy of Socialist Harry Rogoff, sponsored by the ACWA

The Amalgamated solidified its gains and extended its power in Chicago through a series of strikes in the last half of the 1910s. The Amalgamated found it harder, on the other hand, to make gains in Baltimore, where it was able to sign an agreement with one of the largest manufacturers that, like HSM (Hart Schaffner and Marx) in Chicago, sought labor peace, it found itself at odds with an unusual alliance of UGW locals, the corrupt head of the Baltimore Federation of Labor, and the Industrial Workers of the World, who undermined the Amalgamated's strikes and attacked strikers. Complicating the picture further were the ethnic bonds between the many Lithuanian members of the IWW and the subcontractors whom the Amalgamated was trying to put out of business and the anarcho-syndicalist politics of many Lithuanian workers, who had developed their politics in opposition to czarist oppression in their homeland. The Amalgamated eventually prevailed, as the contradictions between the IWW's politics and its alliance with small contractors and the AFL eventually undercut its support among Lithuanian workers.

The ACWA also benefited from the relatively pro-union stance of the federal government during World War I, during which the federal Board of Control and Labor Standards for Army Clothing enforced a policy of labor peace in return for union recognition. With the support of key progressives, such as Walter Lippman, Felix Frankfurter, and Charles Rosen the union was able to obtain government support in organizing outposts such as Rochester, New York, as part of an experiment in industrial democracy.

That experiment ended in 1919, when employers in nearly every industry with a history of unionism went on the offensive. The ACWA not only survived a four-month lockout in New York City, but came away in an even stronger position. By 1920, the union had contracts with 85 percent of men's garment manufacturers and had reduced the workweek to 44 hours.

Under Hillman's leadership, the union tried to moderate the fierce competition between employers in the industry by imposing industry wide working standards, thereby taking wages and hours out of the competitive calculus. The ACWA tried to regulate the industry in other ways, arranging loans and conducting efficiency studies for financially troubled employers. Hillman also favored "constructive cooperation" with employers, relying on arbitration rather than strikes to resolve disputes during the life of a contract. As he explained his philosophy in 1938:

Certainly, I believe in collaborating with the employers! That is what unions are for. I even believe in helping an employer function more productively. For then, we will have a claim to higher wages, shorter hours, and greater participation in the benefits of running a smooth industrial machine....

The ACWA also pioneered a version of "social unionism" that offered low-cost cooperative housing and unemployment insurance to union members and founded a bank, Amalgamated Bank, that would serve labor's interests. Hillman and the ACWA had strong ties to many progressive reformers, such as Jane Addams and Clarence Darrow.

Hillman was, on the other hand, opposed to revolutionary unionism and to the Communist Party USA. While Hillman had maintained warm relations with the Communist Party during the early 1920s—at a time when his leadership was being challenged both by the Forward on the right and by Lithuanian and Italian syndicalists and Jewish anarchists within the union on the left—those relations cooled in 1924 when the CP withdrew its support for the Farmer–Labor Party created to support La Follette's candidacy for President. From that point forward Hillman battled the CP activists within his union, but without the massive internecine strife that nearly tore apart the ILGWU in this era.

The CP did not refuse to put up a fight when it broke with Hillman and the ACW leadership. The struggle was most acute in outlying areas, such as Montreal, Toronto and Rochester, where the CP and its Canadian counterpart were strongly entrenched. In New York City the fight was often physical, as Hillman brought in Abraham Beckerman, a prominent member of the Socialist Party with close ties to The Forward, to use strongarm tactics on communist opponents within the union. By the end of the decade, the CP was no longer a significant force in the union.

== Fighting organized crime ==
While battling the CP, Hillman turned a blind eye to the infiltration of gangsters within the union. The garment industry had been riddled for decades with small-time gangsters, who ran protection and loansharking rackets while offering muscle in labor disputes. First hired to strongarm strikers, some went to work for unions, who used them first for self-defense, then to intimidate strikebreakers and recalcitrant employers. ILG locals used "Dopey" Benny Fein, who refused on principle to work for employers.

Internecine warfare between labor sluggers eliminated many of the earliest racketeers. "Little Augie" Jacob Orgen took over the racket, providing muscle for the ILGWU in the 1926 strike. Louis "Lepke" Buchalter had Orgen assassinated in 1927 in order to take over his operations. Buchalter took an interest in the industry, acquiring ownership of a number of trucking firms and control of local unions of truckdrivers in the garment district, while acquiring an ownership interest in some garment firms and local unions.

Buchalter, who had provided services for some locals of the Amalgamated during the 1920s, also acquired influence within the ACW. Among his allies within the ACW were Beckerman and Philip Orlofsky, another officer in Cutters Local 4, who made sweetheart deals with manufacturers that allowed them to subcontract to cut-rate subcontractors out of town, using Buchalter's trucking companies to bring the goods back and forth.

In 1931 Hillman resolved to act against Buchalter, Beckerman and Orlofsky. He began by orchestrating public demands on Jimmy Walker, the corrupt Tammany Hall Mayor of New York, to crack down on racketeering in the garment district, Hillman then proceeded to seize control of Local 4, expelling Beckerman and Orlofsky from the union, then taking action against corrupt union officials in Newark, New Jersey. The union then struck a number of manufacturers to bar the subcontracting of work to non-union or cut rate contractors in Pennsylvania and New Jersey. In the course of that strike the union picketed a number of trucks run by Buchalter's companies to prevent them from bringing finished goods back to New York.

While the campaign cleaned up the ACW, it did not drive Buchalter out of the industry. The union may, in fact, have made a deal of some sort with Buchalter, although no evidence has ever surfaced, despite intensive efforts of political opponents of the union, such as Thomas Dewey and Westbrook Pegler, to find it. Buchalter claimed, before his execution in 1944, that he had never dealt with either Hillman or Dubinsky, head of the ILGWU.

== The Great Depression and the founding of the CIO ==
The Great Depression reduced the Amalgamated's membership to one third or less of its former strength. Like many other unions, the ACWA revived with the passage of the National Industrial Recovery Act, whose promise of legal protection for workers' right to organize brought thousands of garment workers back to the ACWA. The AFL finally allowed the ACWA to affiliate in 1933.

Hillman and the ACWA were supporters of the New Deal and Roosevelt from the outset. FDR named Hillman to the Labor Advisory Board of the National Recovery Administration in 1933 and to the National Industrial Recovery Board in 1934. Hillman provided key assistance to Senator Robert F. Wagner in the drafting of the National Labor Relations Act and to Secretary of Labor Frances Perkins in winning enactment of the Fair Labor Standards Act.

Within the AFL, the ACWA was one of the strongest advocates for organizing the mass production industries, such as automobile manufacture and steel, where unions had almost no presence, as well as the textile industry, which was only partially organized. Hillman was one of the original founders in 1935 of the Committee for Industrial Organizing, an effort led by John L. Lewis, and the ACWA followed the Mine Workers and other unions out of the AFL in 1937 to establish the CIO as a separate union confederation. With the new federation establishing itself as a viable alternative to the AFL, Hillman would serve as its first vice president. The ACWA experienced prodigious growth during the CIO's early years. At the federation's founding in 1935, the ACWA's members numbered roughly 100,000, but by 1940, they had more than doubled, counting 239,000 members in 265 locals.

The ACWA provided major financial support for the Textile Workers Organizing Committee, which sought to establish a new union for textile workers after the disastrous defeat of the United Textile Workers' strike in 1934. The Textile Workers Union of America, with more than 100,000 members, came out of that effort in 1939 as part of Operation Dixie. The ACWA also helped create the Retail, Wholesale and Department Store Workers Union of America through the CIO's Department Store Workers Organizing Committee.

Hillman and Lewis eventually had a falling out, with Lewis advocating a more independent tack in dealing with the federal government than Hillman. Lewis, however, gradually distanced himself from the CIO, finally resigning as its head and then withdrawing the United Mine Workers from it in 1942. Hillman remained in it, still the second most visible leader after Philip Murray, Lewis' successor.

Jacob Potofsky, a fellow veteran of the Hart. Schaffner & Marx strike of 1910, succeeded Hillman upon his death in 1946. The Amalgamated continued to grow during the 1950s, crossing the 300,000 member threshold in 1951, but, like other garment unions, faced long-term pressures from the flight of unionized work to non-union manufacturers in the South and abroad.

== Mergers ==
The ACWA had played a leading role in the funding and leadership of the Textile Workers Organizing Committee, an organization founded by the CIO in 1939 as part of its effort to organize the South. The TWOC, which later renamed itself the Textile Workers Union of America, grew to as many as 100,000 members in the 1940s, but made little headway organizing in the South in the decades that followed.

In 1961, the International Glove Workers' Union of America merged into the ACWA. The ACWA merged with the TWUA in 1976 to form the Amalgamated Clothing and Textile Workers Union.

== Political activities ==
The ACWA had been active in trying to form a labor party in the 1920s, combining some elements of the Socialist Party with supporters of La Follette.

Hillman used the ACWA as a base, along with the ILGWU led by David Dubinsky, in founding the American Labor Party in 1936, an ostensibly independent party that served as a halfway house for Socialists and other leftists who wanted to support FDR's reelection but were not prepared to join the Democratic Party. Dubinsky later split from the Labor Party over personal and political differences with Hillman to found the Liberal Party of New York.

ACWA represented strikers in the Farah strike, 1972–1974.

== Leadership ==
=== Presidents ===
1914: Sidney Hillman
1946: Jacob Potofsky
1972: Murray Finley

=== Secretary-Treasurers ===
1914: Joseph Schlossberg
1940: Jacob Potofsky
1946: Frank Rosenblum
1972: Jack Sheinkman

== Co-founding Vice Presidents ==
- Bessie Abramowitz Hillman
- August Bellanca
- Dorothy Jacobs Bellanca
- Joseph Catalanotti
- Louis Hollander

== See also ==
- Cooperative Village
- Jimmy Burke
- Dorothy Jacobs Bellanca
- Russian-American Industrial Corporation
