= Jack Sheinkman =

American labor union leader (1926–2004)

Jacob Sheinkman (December 6, 1926 – January 29, 2004) was an American labor union leader.

Sheinkman was born in the Bronx, to parents who had recently emigrated from Kyiv. In his youth, Sheinkman attended Evander Childs High School and was active in the Workmen's Circle. He served in the US Navy during World War II, then in the Naval Reserve, where he became a lieutenant. After the war, he studied industrial labor relations at Cornell University, then law, and also completed a certificate in economics with the University of Oxford.

After completing his studies, Sheinkman became an organizer with the International Brotherhood of Pulp, Sulphite and Paper Mill Workers, then in 1953 switched to work for the Amalgamated Clothing Workers of America. In 1958, he became the union's general counsel, then in 1972, he was elected as its secretary-treasurer. The union merged into the new Amalgamated Clothing and Textile Workers Union, and Sheinkman continued as secretary-treasurer, then in 1987, he was elected as its president. As leader of the union, he was prominent in opposition to CIA activities in Nicaragua, and was also known for working with companies in an attempt to persuade them to keep jobs in America. He also served on the President's Advisory Committee for Trade Policy and Negotiations.

With the textile and clothing industry in decline, Sheinkman arranged a further merger, which in 1995 formed the Union of Needletrades, Industrial and Textile Employees. He retired, taking the title of president emeritus of the new union, and instead becoming chair of Americans for Democratic Action.

Trade union offices
Preceded by Frank Rosenblum	Secretary-Treasurer of the Amalgamated Clothing Workers Union; 1972–1976	Succeeded by Union merged
Preceded by Charles S. Zimmerman	President of the Jewish Labor Committee; 1974–1979	Succeeded by Donald S. Slaiman
Preceded by Union founded	Secretary-Treasurer of the Amalgamated Clothing and Textile Workers Union; 1976–1986	Succeeded by Charles Sallee
Preceded by Murray Finley	President of the Amalgamated Clothing and Textile Workers Union; 1986–1995	Succeeded by Union merged
Non-profit organization positions
Preceded by John Lewis	Chair of Americans for Democratic Action; 1995–1998	Succeeded by Jim Jontz
