= Sidney Hillman =

American labor leader (1887–1946)

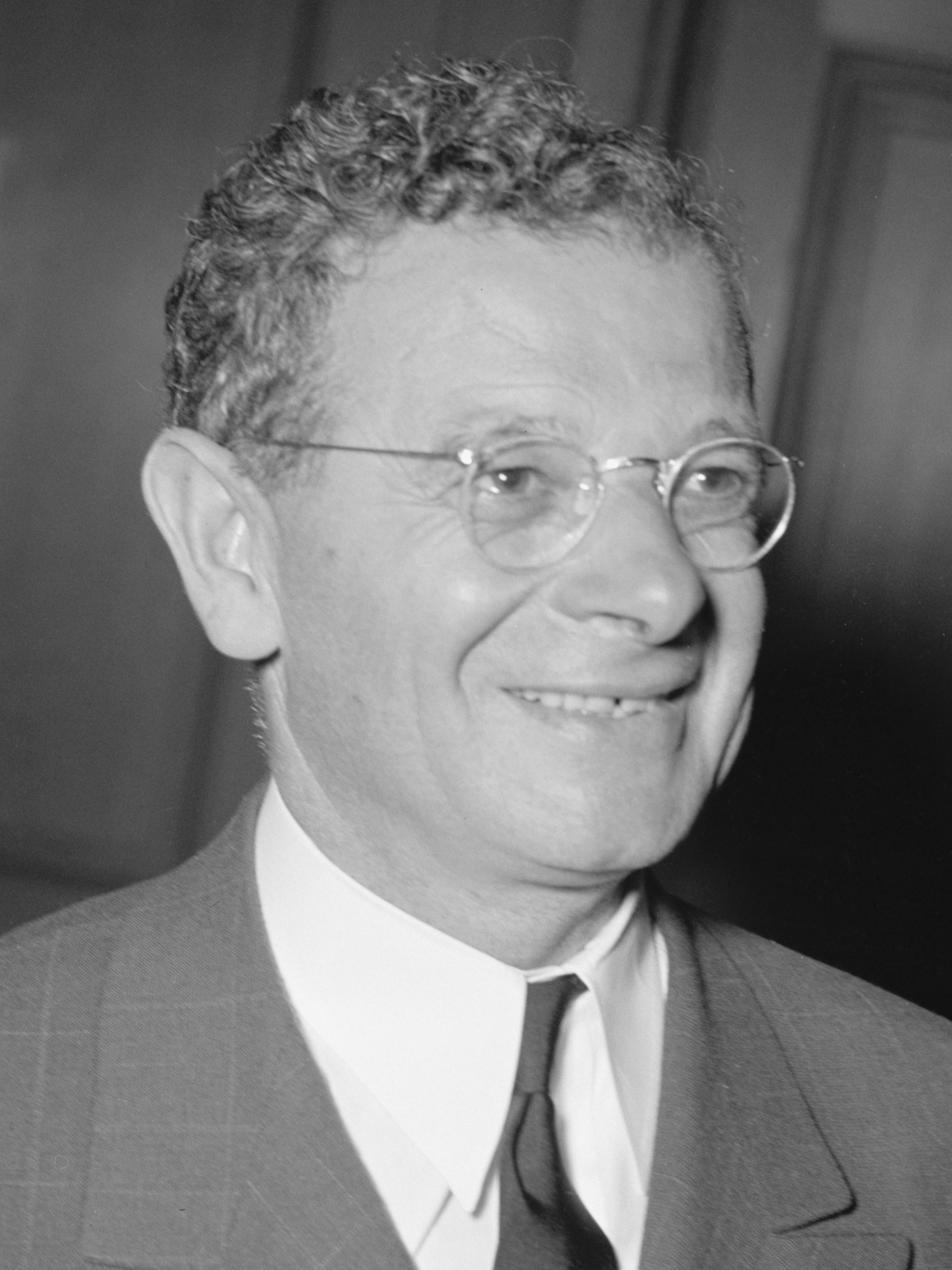
- Hillman c. 1940

President of the Amalgamated Clothing Workers of America
- In office October 14, 1914 – July 10, 1946
- Preceded by: Office established
- Succeeded by: Jacob Potofsky

New York State Chairman of the American Labor Party
- In office April 8, 1944 – July 10, 1946
- Preceded by: George Counts
- Succeeded by: Hyman Blumberg

Personal details
- Born: March 23, 1887 Žagarė, Russian Empire (now Lithuania)
- Died: July 10, 1946 (aged 59) Point Lookout, New York, U.S.
- Resting place: Westchester Hills Cemetery
- Party: American Labor
- Spouse: Bessie Abramowitz (m. 1916)
- Children: 2
- Occupation: Labor leader

Sidney Hillman (March 23, 1887 – July 10, 1946) was an American labor leader. He was the head of the Amalgamated Clothing Workers of America and was a key figure in the founding of the Congress of Industrial Organizations and in marshaling labor's support for President Franklin D. Roosevelt and the New Deal coalition of the Democratic Party.

== Early life ==
Sidney Hillman was born in Žagarė, Lithuania, then part of the Russian Empire, on March 23, 1887, the son of Lithuanian Jewish parents. Sidney's maternal grandfather was a small-scale merchant; his paternal grandfather was a rabbi known for his piety and lack of concern for material possessions. Hillman's father was himself an impoverished merchant, more concerned with reading and prayer than with his faltering business.

From a young age Sidney had shown great academic promise, mastering the rote memorization upon which the cheder education of the day was based. By the age of 13, Hillman had memorized several volumes of the Talmud. The next year he was chosen by the Hillman rabbinical clan to go away to attend yeshiva in Vilijampolė, a small town across the river from the city of Kaunas. It was hoped that Sidney would follow in the Hillman family tradition by becoming a rabbi.

Things did not proceed as planned, however. While in Slobodka, Hillman began to regularly attend the secret meetings of an illegal study circle headed by a local druggist. The study circle's members read radical literature and books on political economy, and Hillman was here exposed to the works of Charles Darwin, Karl Marx, John Stuart Mill, and Herbert Spencer in Russian translation.

== Career ==
=== Russia ===
Early in 1903, Hillman passed from the training grounds of the Marxist study circle to fully fledged membership in the Bund, a revolutionary socialist union of Jewish workers within the Pale in conflict with the Tsarist authorities. Hillman became a leading activist in the Bund, leading the first May Day march ever conducted by the organization through the streets of Kovno in 1904. Hillman was arrested shortly thereafter for his revolutionary activities and sat in prison for several months, where he learned more about revolutionary social theory from fellow prisoners.

By 1905 Hillman — along with many others in the Bund — had come to identify himself with the Menshevik wing of the Russian Social Democratic Labor Party (RSDLP), identifying in particular with the internationalism of Julius Martov. Hillman played only a minor local role during the Russian Revolution of 1905, engaging in the distribution of leaflets, raising funds for the revolutionary organization, and informally speaking on the streets to groups of workers.

=== Great Britain ===
In 1906, Tsarist repression in the form of police raids and organized pogroms forced the Russian socialist movement back underground. Hillman joined the exodus of revolutionaries from the country in October 1906, traveling under a false passport through Germany to Manchester, England, where he joined his uncle, a prosperous furniture dealer, and two brothers already living there.

=== Chicago ===
In the summer of 1907, Hillman emigrated once again, this time setting out for America aboard the White Star liner Cedric, arriving in New York City on August 8. Hillman's prospects were poor in New York and he soon set out for Chicago, where a friend and a more favorable job market awaited him.

In Chicago, Hillman worked briefly picking orders in a warehouse for $6 a week. He then found a slightly better-paying job as a clerk in the infants' wear department of Sears, Roebuck & Co. Hillman remained in that position for nearly two years before being fired in the spring of 1909 during a downturn of business.

The unemployed Hillman found work in the garment industry as an apprentice garment cutter for Hart Schaffner & Marx, a prominent manufacturer of men's clothing. It would prove to be Hillman's last job as a worker at the bench.

=== Amalgamated Clothing Workers Union ===
==== Formation ====
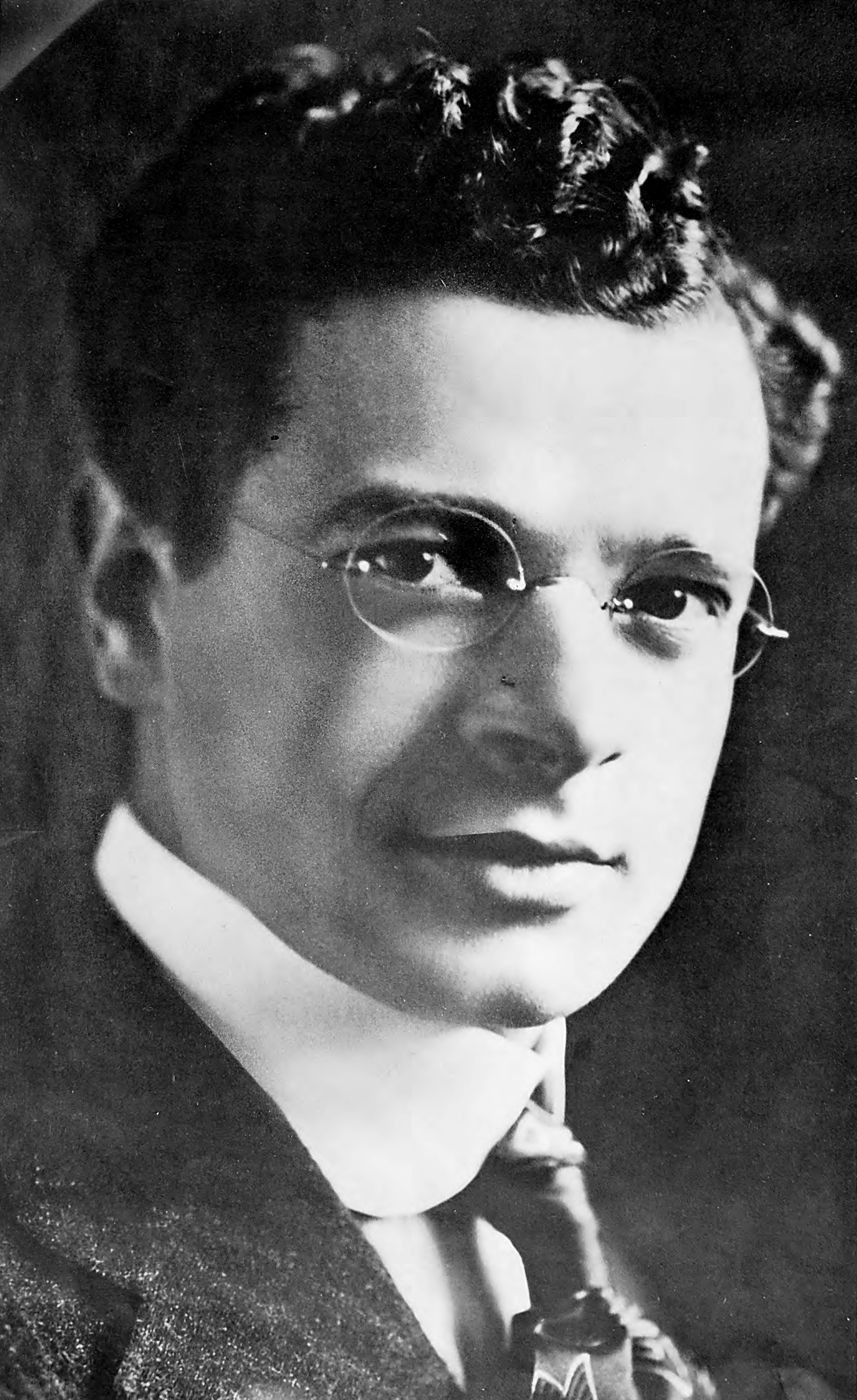
Hillman in 1914

When a spontaneous strike by a handful of women workers there led to a citywide strike of 45,000 garment workers in 1910, Hillman was a rank-and-file leader in the strike. That strike was a bitter one and pitted the strikers against not only their employers and the local authorities, but also their own union, the United Garment Workers, a conservative AFL affiliate. When the UGW accepted an inadequate settlement, the membership rejected the offer and continued the strike, winning some gains at Hart, Schaffner. Hillman became a business agent for the new local.

The leadership of the international union mistrusted the more militant local leadership in Chicago and in other large urban locals, which had strong Socialist loyalties. When it tried to disenfranchise those locals' members at the UGW's 1914 convention, those locals, representing two thirds of the union's membership, bolted to form the Amalgamated Clothing Workers of America.

Hillman had taken the position of Chief Clerk within the International Ladies' Garment Workers' Union in New York in early 1914. He found that job, in which he tried to maintain the stability imposed on a ferociously competitive industry by the Protocols of Peace, and in which the internal rivalries within the union threatened to flare up into all-out conflict, frustrating. When the insurgents who had walked out of the UGW convention to form the Amalgamated sent him a telegram imploring him to accept the Presidency, followed by another telegram from Bessie Abramowitz (b.1889). She was one of the original leaders of the 1910 strike, an important figure in union politics and his fiancée. Hillman accepted and left the ILG after less than a year.

Hillman knew the risks he was taking. The AFL refused to recognize the new union and the UGW regularly raided it, furnishing strikebreakers and signing contracts with struck employers, in the years to come. He helped the Amalgamated solidify its gains and extend its power in Chicago through a series of strikes in the last half of the 1910s and to extend the union's membership into important garment centers in Baltimore and Rochester, New York, where the union had to overcome divisions within garment workers on ethnic lines and the opposition of the Industrial Workers of the World. Manning ramparts for Hillman in Rochester was Paul Blanshard.

The ACWA also benefited from the relatively pro-union stance of the federal government during World War I, during which the federal Board of Control and Labor Standards for Army Clothing enforced a policy of labor peace in return for union recognition. Hillman was particularly receptive to the opportunities that government intervention in labor relations presented the union; he not only did not have the ingrained distrust of governmental regulation that now marked Samuel Gompers and other leaders of the AFL, but had a firm belief in the sort of industrial democracy in which government helped mediate between labor and management. The government's interest in maintaining production and avoiding disruptive strikes helped the Amalgamated organize non-union outposts such as Rochester and control the cutthroat competition that had prevailed in the industry for decades.

That policy ended in 1919, when employers in nearly every industry with a history of unionism went on the offensive. The ACWA not only survived a four-month lockout in New York City in 1919, but came away in an even stronger position. By 1920, the union had contracts with 85 percent of men's garment manufacturers in the city and had reduced the workweek to 44 hours.

==== Social unionism and economic rationalization ====
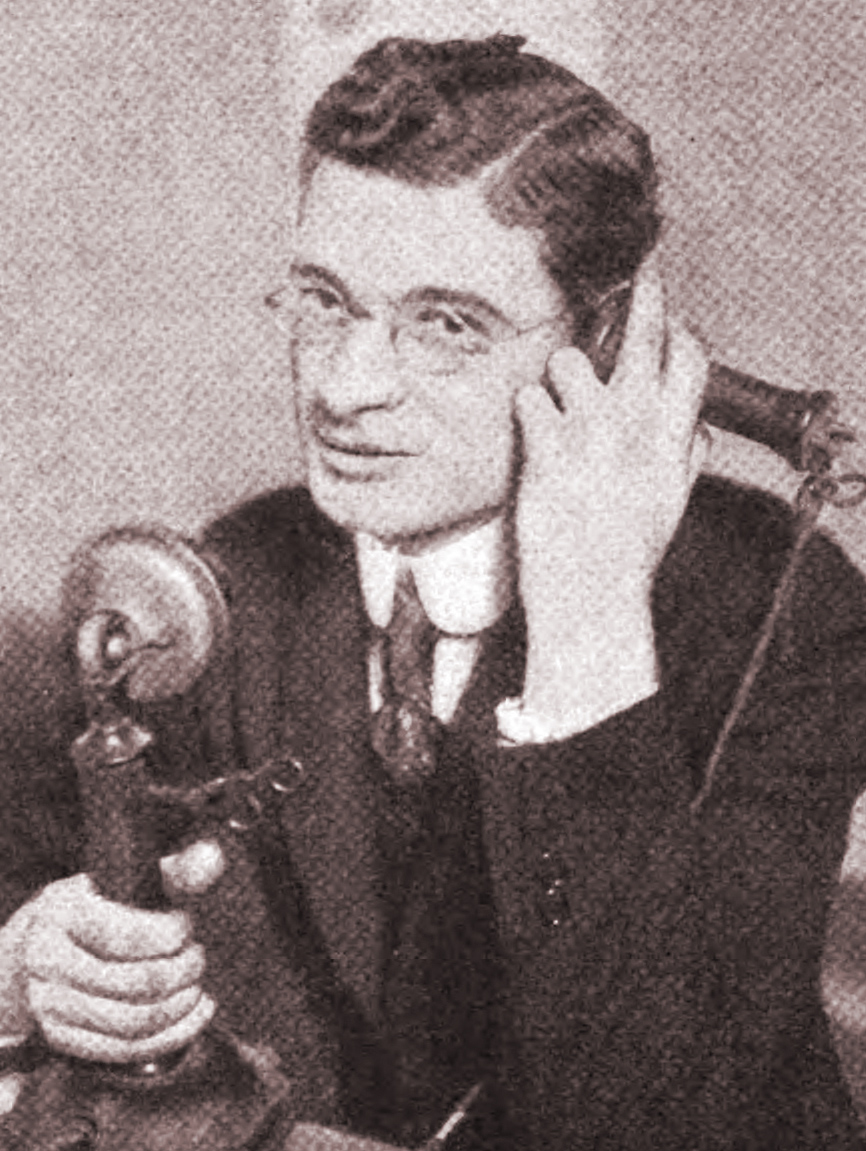
Hillman c. 1922

The ACWA pioneered a version of "social unionism" in the 1920s that offered low-cost cooperative housing and unemployment insurance to union members and founded a bank (Amalgamated Bank) that would serve labor's interests. Hillman had strong ties to many progressive reformers, such as Jane Addams and Clarence Darrow, who had assisted the Amalgamated in its early strikes in Chicago in 1910 and New York in 1913. While other unions, notably the railroad brotherhoods and building trades unions within the AFL also founded banks of their own, the Amalgamated also used its banks to supervise the business operations of those garment businesses that came to it for loans.

Under Hillman's leadership, the union tried to moderate the fierce competition between employers in the industry by imposing industry wide working standards, thereby taking wages and hours out of the competitive calculus. The ACWA tried to regulate the industry in other ways, arranging loans and conducting efficiency studies for financially troubled employers. Hillman also favored "constructive cooperation" with employers, relying on arbitration rather than strikes to resolve disputes during the life of a contract. As Hillman explained his philosophy in 1938:

Certainly, I believe in collaborating with the employers! That is what unions are for. I even believe in helping an employer function more productively. For then, we will have a claim to higher wages, shorter hours, and greater participation in the benefits of running a smooth industrial machine....

Hillman's belief in stability as the basis for progress was linked with a willingness to embrace industrial engineering approaches, such as Taylorism, that sought to rationalize the work processes as well. This put Hillman and the ACW leadership at odds with the strong anarcho-syndicalist tendencies within the union's membership, many of whom believed in direct action as a principle as well as tactic.

==== Bolshevism ====
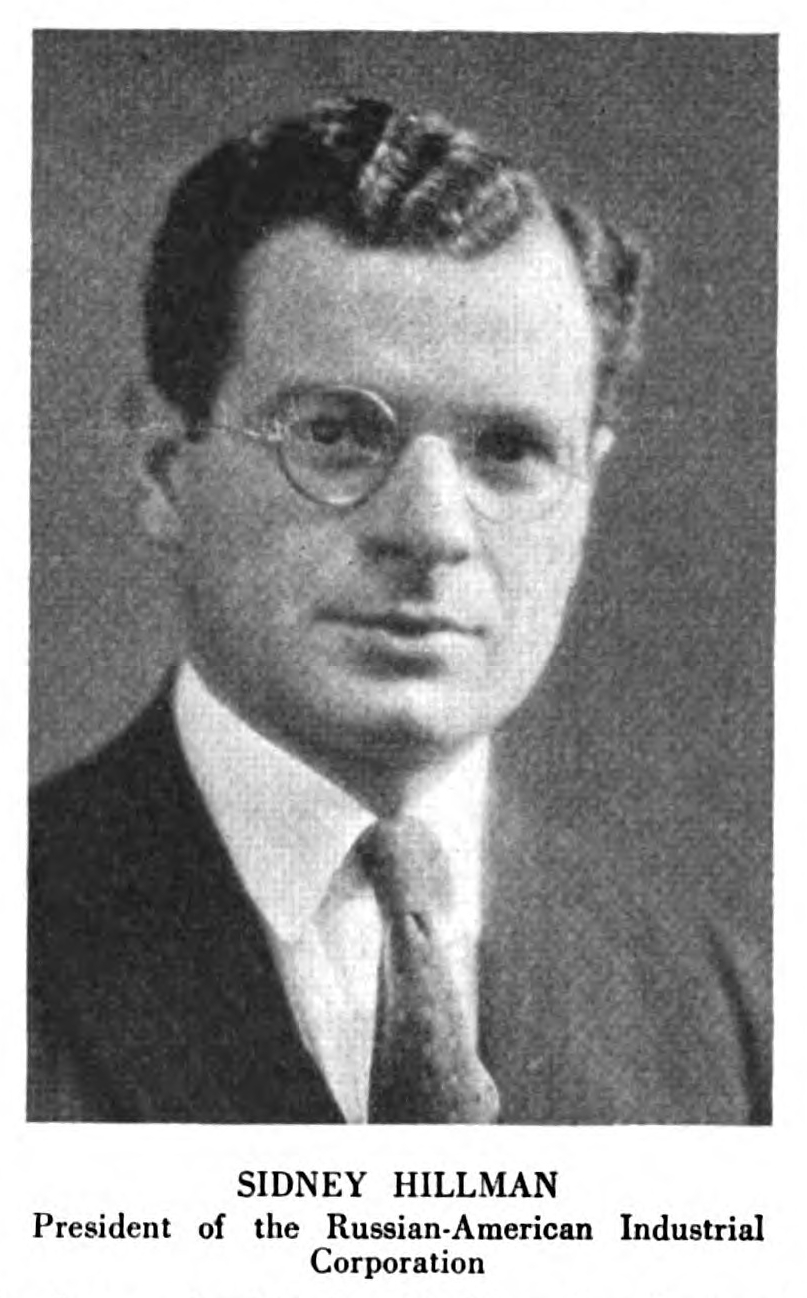
Hillman in Soviet Russia Pictorial, February 1923

On the other hand, it made Hillman receptive in the early 1920s to the Soviet Union's reconstruction efforts, particularly during its New Economic Policy phase. Hillman led the union into a joint business project with the Soviet Union that brought western technology and principles of industrial management to ten clothing factories in the Soviet Union.

The mechanism for this interaction was the Russian-American Industrial Corporation (RAIC) at 31 Union Square, New York City, launched by Hillman with Max Lowenthal as his attorney. Both Hillman and Lowenthal were also among the original directors of the Amalgamated Bank of New York, as advertised in the Liberator magazine. The ad mentions that the bank is owned and operated by the Amalgamated Clothing Workers. It lists chairman Hyman Blumberg, president R. L. Redheffer, vice president Jacob S. Potofsky, cashier Leroy Peterson, and directors including Sidney Hillman, August Bellanca, Fiorello H. La Guardia, Joseph Schlossberg, and Max Zaritsky.

Hillman's support for the Soviet experiment won him the enthusiastic support of the Communist Party USA in the early 1920s; it also further alienated him from those in the Socialist Party and associated with the Daily Forward under the leadership of Abraham Cahan, with whom Hillman and the Amalgamated already had strained relations. While Hillman's relationship with the Communist Party ultimately broke up in the conflict over whether to support Robert La Follette, Sr.'s candidacy for President on the Progressive Party ticket in 1924, Hillman never faced the sort of volcanic upsurge that nearly tore apart the International Ladies' Garment Workers' Union during this period and never undertook the wholesale purges that David Dubinsky and other leaders of the ILGWU used to stay in power. By the end of the decade, after fighting and losing battles in Montreal, Toronto and Rochester, the CP was no longer a significant force in the union.

==== Fighting organized crime ====
While battling the CP, Hillman turned a blind eye to the infiltration of gangsters within the union. The garment industry had been riddled for decades with small-time gangsters, who ran protection and loansharking rackets while offering muscle in labor disputes. First hired to strongarm strikers, some went to work for unions, who used them first for self-defense, then to intimidate strikebreakers and recalcitrant employers. ILG locals used "Dopey" Benny Fein and his sluggers, who were more often hired by unions than employers although they were thugs for hire.

Internecine warfare between labor sluggers eliminated many of the earliest racketeers. "Little Augie" Jacob Orgen took over the racket, providing muscle for the ILGWU in the 1926 strike. Louis "Lepke" Buchalter had Orgen assassinated in 1927 in order to take over his operations. Buchalter took an interest in the industry, acquiring ownership of a number of trucking firms and control of local unions of truckdrivers in the garment district, while acquiring an ownership interest in some garment firms and local unions.

Buchalter, who had provided services for some locals of the Amalgamated during the 1920s. also acquired influence within the ACWA. One of his allies within the ACWA was Abraham Beckerman, a prominent member of the Socialist Party with close ties to The Forward, whom Hillman used to inflict strongarm tactics on his communist opponents within the union. Beckerman and Philip Orlofsky, another local officer in Cutters Local 4, made sweetheart deals with manufacturers that allowed them to subcontract to cut rate subcontractors out of town, using Buchalter's trucking companies to bring the goods back and forth.

In 1931, Hillman resolved to act against Buchalter, Beckerman, and Orlofsky. He began by orchestrating public demands on Jimmy Walker, the corrupt Tammany Hall Mayor of New York, to crack down on racketeering in the garment district, Hillman then seized control of Local 4, expelling Beckerman and Orlofsky from the union, then taking action against corrupt union officials in Newark, New Jersey. The union then struck a number of manufacturers to bar the subcontracting of work to non-union or cut rate contractors in Pennsylvania and New Jersey. In the course of that strike the union picketed a number of trucks run by Buchalter's companies to prevent them from bringing finished goods back to New York.

While the campaign cleaned up the ACWA, it did not drive Buchalter out of the industry. The union may, in fact, have made a deal of some sort with Buchalter, although no evidence has ever surfaced, despite intensive efforts to find it by political opponents of the union, such as Thomas Dewey and Westbrook Pegler. Buchalter claimed, before his execution in 1944, that he had never had any deal with either Hillman or Dubinsky, head of the ILGWU. He did claim to have murdered a factory owner and labour opponents of Hillman at Hillman's behest, a claim which was never corroborated.

=== Great Depression and CIO ===
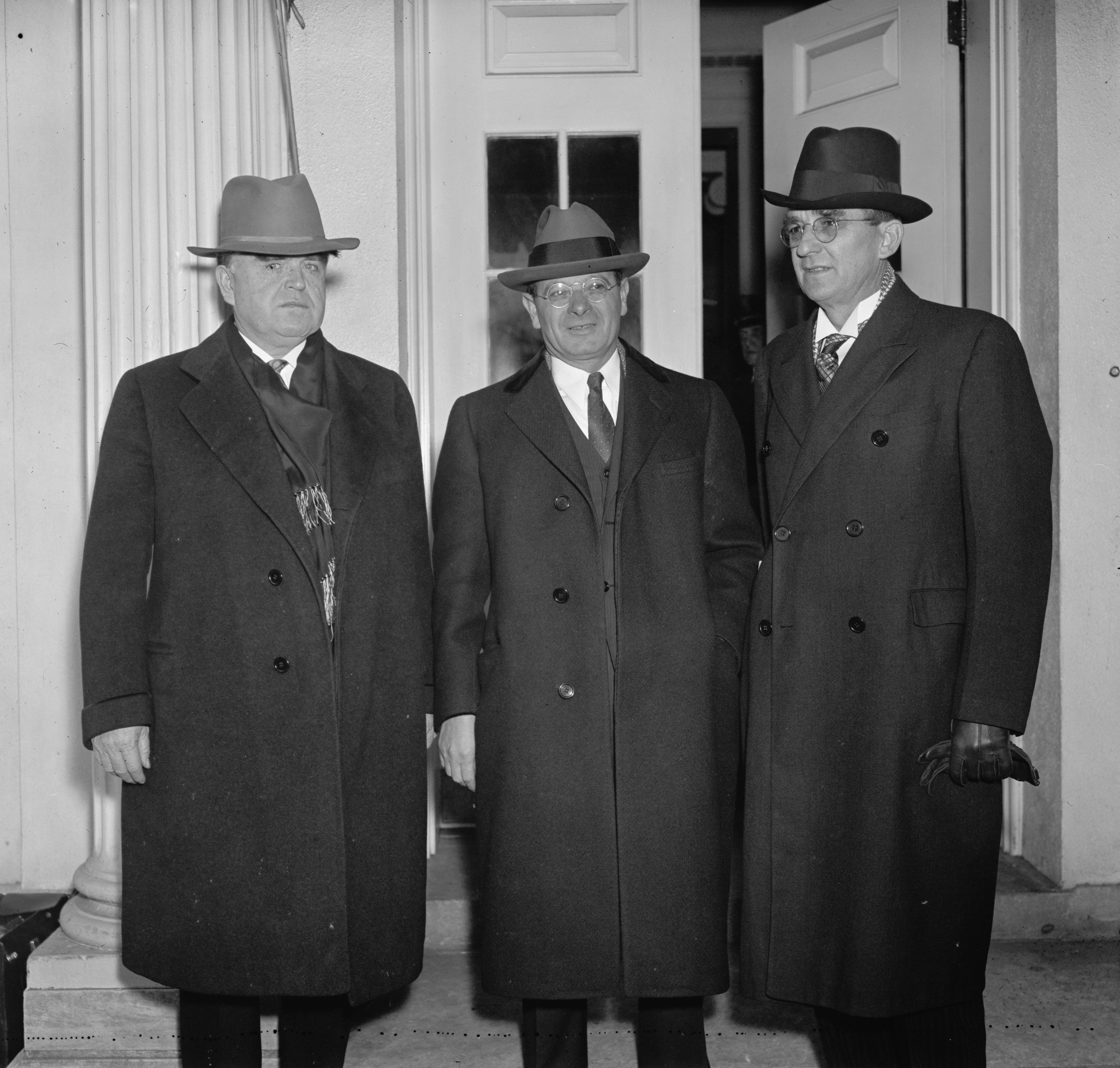
John L. Lewis, Hillman, and Charles P. Howard exit the White House after discussing labor legislation with president Franklin D. Roosevelt, 1937

The Great Depression reduced the Amalgamated's membership to one third or less of its former strength. Like many other unions, the ACWA revived with the passage of the National Industrial Recovery Act, whose promise of legal protection for workers' right to organize brought thousands of garment workers back to the ACWA. The AFL finally allowed the ACWA to affiliate in 1933.

Hillman was a supporter of the New Deal and Roosevelt from the outset. FDR named him to the Labor Advisory Board of the National Recovery Administration in 1933 and to the National Industrial Recovery Board in 1934. Hillman provided key assistance to Senator Robert F. Wagner in the drafting of the National Labor Relations Act and to Secretary of Labor Frances Perkins in winning enactment of the Fair Labor Standards Act.

Within the AFL, Hillman was one of the strongest advocates for organizing the mass production industries, such as automobile manufacture and steel, where unions had almost no presence, as well as the textile industry, which was only partially organized. He was one of the original founders in 1935 of the Committee for Industrial Organizing (later the Congress of Industrial Organizations; CIO), an effort led by John L. Lewis, and became Vice-President of the CIO when it established itself as a separate union confederation in 1937.

Hillman played a role in nearly every major initiative of the CIO in those years. He oversaw, and provided major financial support for, the Textile Workers Organizing Committee, which sought to establish a new union for textile workers after the disastrous defeat of the United Textile Workers' strike in 1934. The Textile Workers Union of America, with more than 100,000 members, came out of that effort in 1939. Hillman also played a decisive role in mediating the internal disputes that nearly destroyed the United Auto Workers in its infancy in 1938 and helped create the Retail, Wholesale and Department Store Workers Union of America through the CIO's Department Store Workers Organizing Committee.

Hillman and Lewis eventually had a falling out, with Lewis advocating a more independent tack in dealing with the federal government than Hillman. Lewis, however, gradually distanced himself from the CIO, finally resigning as its head and then withdrawing the United Mine Workers from it in 1942. Hillman remained in it, still the second most visible leader after Philip Murray, Lewis' successor.

=== Political activities ===
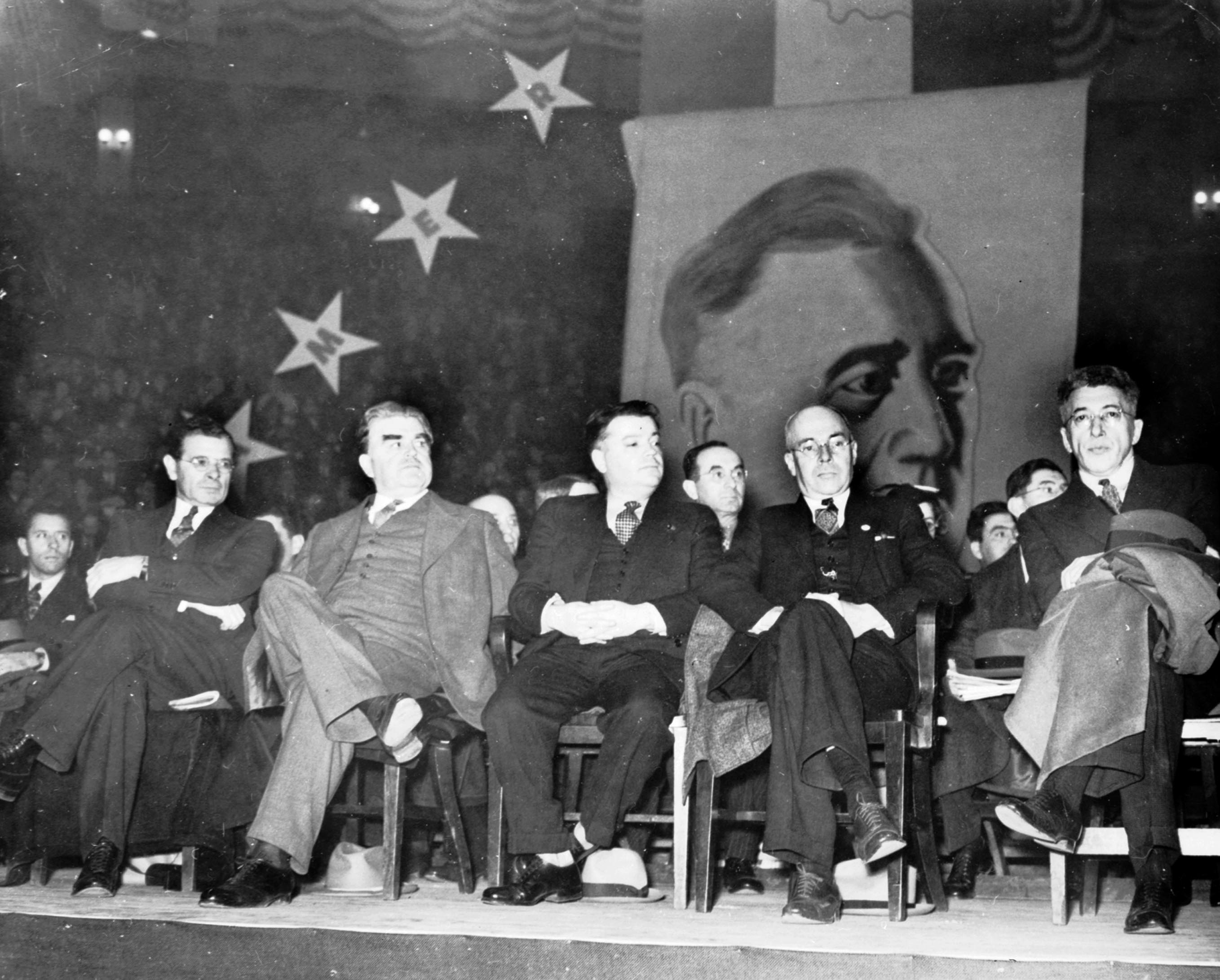
Hillman, John L. Lewis, David Dubinsky, and Baruch Charney Vladeck at an American Labor Party rally

Hillman and Dubinsky founded the American Labor Party in 1936, an ostensibly independent party that served as a halfway house for Socialists and other leftists who wanted to support FDR's reelection but were not prepared to join the Democratic Party, with its alliance with the most reactionary white elites in the South. Dubinsky later split from the Labor Party over personal and political differences with Hillman to found the Liberal Party of New York.

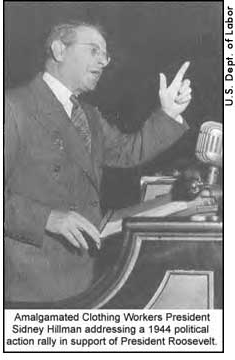
Hillman addressing a 1944 political rally

Hillman was a strong opponent of Nazi Germany and a supporter of U.S. aid to England and France. Roosevelt appointed Hillman to the National Defense Advisory Committee in 1940 and named him associate director of the Office of Production Management in 1941. When FDR created the War Production Board in 1942, he appointed Hillman to serve as the head of its labor division.

As in the case in World War I, Hillman used the influence of the federal government to advance both labor's social goals and its immediate organizing needs. Hillman was unable to persuade the Board to debar labor law violators but did help introduce arbitration as an alternative to strikes in defense industries. Hillman's prioritization of emergency production for national defense over labor radicalism brought him criticism from others within the CIO, as when he stood with the Roosevelt administration's decision to send in troops to break a wildcat strike at the North American Aviation plant in Inglewood, California in 1941. (The strikers' wage demands were soon conceded in arbitration, which the Communist-supported strike had forestalled.)

Hillman also believed in the need for unions to mobilize their members politically. He and Lewis founded Labor's Non-Partisan League, which campaigned for Roosevelt in 1936 and again in 1940, even though Lewis himself had endorsed Wendell Willkie that year. Hillman was the first chair of the CIO Political Action Committee, founded in 1942, as well as of the National Citizens Political Action Committee (NCPAC) (which co-founded the 1948 Progressive Party).

In July 1943, Philip Murray of the CIO led formation of the CIO-PAC, of which Hillman was the first head. In Roosevelt's last election in 1944, Hillman raised nearly $1 million on behalf of the Democrat national ticket. Hillman was also credited with grass roots activities, registering labor voters and bringing them in heavy numbers to the polls. In 1945, he attended the World Trade Union Conference in London alongside many renowned trade unionists.

== Personal life ==
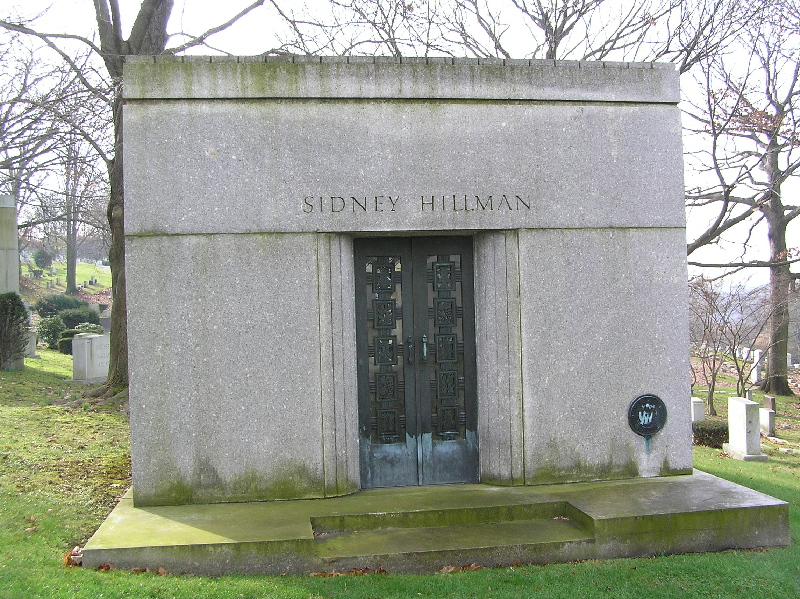
The mausoleum of Sidney Hillman in Westchester Hills Cemetery.

Hillman and Bessie Abramowitz were married in 1916 and had two daughters.

== Death ==
Hillman, who had been sick for some time, died of a heart attack at age 59 on July 10, 1946, at his summer home in Point Lookout, New York. His body was interred in a mausoleum located at Westchester Hills Cemetery, 20 miles north of New York City.

== Legacy ==
According to labor historian David Brody, Hillman built upon the conservative job-oriented unionism that dominated the American scene, discarding his youthful radicalism and opposition to capitalism. Hillman was realistic, nonideological, and eager for tangible results. Under Hillman's leadership, the Amalgamated became an active partner in the men's clothing business, building two banks, fostering low-cost unemployment insurance, and setting up internal educational and social support programs for union members. This was the "New Unionism"of the 1920s, which combined a large powerful union, with many small capitalist enterprises, all of them controlled by Jews who could talk together easily. Hillman's broader perspective gave him a leading role in forming the CIO and establishing entirely new mass-production unions that confronted not small local Jewish capitalists but world-class corporations. Hillman also was a pioneer in integrating union power with major political powers on a national level. The New Deal had proven a bonanza for union membership growth, and beginning with the 1936 presidential election, Hillman pushed hard for labor to give systematic nationwide support to Roosevelt and the New Deal cause. His main rival was John L. Lewis, who broke with Roosevelt, and with the CIO, leaving Hillman the central labor politician in the national Democratic Party.

Hillman's successor as head of the ACWA, Jacob Potofsky, took a far less visible role within the CIO, a federation which re-united with the AFL in 1955. The American Labor Party that Hillman had helped create passed out of existence in that same year.

The Amalgamated Housing Cooperative in the Bronx was the first limited equity housing cooperative in the United States. It was funded and inspired by Hillman and Abraham Kazan. A street in the neighborhood, Hillman Avenue, is named for him. Hillman is also the namesake of the Hillman Housing Corporation, a housing cooperative sponsored by the Amalgamated Clothing Workers and part of Cooperative Village in Lower East Side of Manhattan.

The Sidney Hillman Foundation, established in his honor, gives annual awards to journalists and writers for work that supports social justice and progressive public policy. The first Sidney Hillman Awards were announced in 1950. In addition, from 1949 to 1995 the foundation made annual awards honoring public figures who pursue social justice and public policy for the common good.

== See also ==
- Amalgamated Clothing Workers of America
- International Ladies' Garment Workers' Union
- Congress of Industrial Organizations
- CIO-PAC
- Russian-American Industrial Corporation
- American Labor Party
- Bessie Abramowitz Hillman

Trade union offices
Preceded by Union founded	President of the Amalgamated Clothing Workers Union; 1914–1946	Succeeded by Jacob Potofsky
