= List of Zionists =

People who played important roles in the definition, historical development and growth of the modern Zionist movement:

== A–B ==
- Sarah Aaronsohn (1890–1917), born and died in Ottoman Syria/Ottoman Empire (now Israel), member of the Nili Jewish spy ring (working for the British)
- Gershon Agron (1890s–1959), born in the Russian Empire (Ukraine), immigrated to Palestine during the First World War when fighting in the Jewish Legion, founder of The Jerusalem Post
- Abba Ahimeir (1897–1962), born in the Russian Empire (Belarus), immigrated to Mandatory Palestine, c.1924, active in Revisionist Zionism
- Sholem Aleichem (1859–1916) born in the Russian Empire (Ukraine), left for New York after witnessing the 1905 pogroms; advocated Zionism in his writings
- Shulamit Aloni (1928–2014), born in Poland, active in Zionist youth movement, later Israeli politician
- Chaim Arlosoroff (1899–1933), born in Romny, Russian Empire (Ukraine), leader of the Yishuv during the British Mandate in Palestine
- David Baazov (1883–1947), born in Tskhinvali, Russian Empire (Georgia/South Ossetia), public and religious figure involved in the Zionist movement in Georgia/Georgian Soviet Socialist Republic
- Meir Bar-Ilan (1880–1949), born in Volozhin, Russian Empire (Belarus), rabbi and leader of Religious Zionists (National Religious Party)
- Shulamit Bat-Dori (1904–1985), born in the Russian Empire (Poland), migrated to Mandatory Palestine in 1923, dramatist founded kibbutz theatre
- Menachem Begin (1913–1992), born in the Russian Empire (Belarus), leader of the militant Irgun group, later prime minister of Israel
- David Ben-Gurion (1886–1973), born in Congress Poland (then Russian Empire), founder and first prime minister of Israel
- Mordechai Bentov (1900–1985), born in the Russian Empire (Poland), immigrated to Mandatory Palestine in 1920, one of the founders of the Kibbutz Movement, later an Israeli politician
- Eliezer Ben-Yehuda (1858–1922) born in the Vilna Governorate (Russian Empire), Hebrew lexicographer and language revivalist
- Hugo Bergmann (1883–1975) born in Austria-Hungary, immigrated to Palestine in 1920
- Max Bodenheimer (1865–1940), German-born lawyer and associate of Theodor Herzl, settled in Palestine in 1935
- Dov Ber Borochov (1881–1917), born in Zolotonosha (Russian Empire/Ukraine), involved in founding Poale Zion party, Yiddish philologist
- Max Brod (1884–1968), born in Prague (then in Bohemia), Zionist from 1912, settled in Mandatory Palestine in 1939

== C–H ==
- Rachel Cohen-Kagan (1888–1982), born in Odessa, activist and Israeli politician
- Abba Eban (1915–2002), born in South Africa, active in the Youth movement and the World Zionist Organization, later Israeli politician
- Albert Einstein (1879–1955), born in the German Empire, scientist who supported the Zionist movement. Albert Einstein's political views#Zionism
- Israel Eldad (1910–1996), Galician-born Revisionist Zionist, follower of Ze'ev Jabotinsky
- Mary Fels (1863–1953), German-born/American philanthropist, Georgist, suffragist, Zionist
- Paul Friedmann (1840–c. 1900), German philanthropist, founded the short-lived Midian colony as a safe haven for Russian Jews
- Nahum Goldmann (1895–1982), born in Vishnevo, Russian Empire, founder and president of the World Zionist Congress
- Shulamit Goldstein (1914–2011), born in Ukraine, underground militant and member of the Irgun.
- Romana Goodman (1885–1955), Polish-born, co-founder of the Federation of Women Zionists in 1918
- A. D. Gordon (Aaron David Gordon, 1856–1922), born in the Russian Empire, Labor/Practical Zionist, founded Hapoel Hatzair
- Uri Zvi Greenberg (1896–1981), Galician-born in present-day Ukraine poet writing in Yiddish and Hebrew; Labor, later Revisionist Zionist
- Dov Gruner (1912–1947), Hungarian-born, active in Mandatory Palestine, member of the Irgun paramilitary group
- Ahad Ha'am (1856–1927), Russian Empire-born, Cultural Zionist
- Theodor Herzl (1860–1904), born in the Austrian Empire, founding father of modern political Zionist movement
- Arthur Hertzberg (1921–2006), Polish-born Rabbi, lived in the United States, scholar of Zionism
- Moses Hess (1812–1875), French-born philosopher, Labor Zionist

== J–R ==
- Ze'ev Jabotinsky (1880–1940), born in the Russian Empire (now Ukraine) publicist, leader of Revisionist Zionism
- Senta Josephtal (1912–2007), born in Germany, joined the HaBonim movement in 1933, immigrated to Palestine in 1938, later Israeli politician
- Zvi Hirsch Kalischer (1795–1874), German (Prussian) Orthodox Rabbi, one of Zionism's earliest pioneers in the country
- Berl Katznelson (1887–1944), born in present-day Belarus, founder of the Histadrut (Jewish trade union) in Palestine during the British mandate
- Abraham Isaac Kook (1865–1935), born in the Russian Empire (now Latvia), religious Zionist, Chief Rabbi of Jerusalem, later Palestine, during the British Mandate period
- Saul Raphael Landau (1870–1943), Polish lawyer, journalist and Zionist activist
- Moshe Leib Lilienblum (1843–1910), born in the Russian Empire (Lithuania) scholar, early advocate of reestablishment of the Jews in Palestine
- Emma Levine-Talmi (1905–2004), born in the Russian Empire (Poland); moved to Mandatory Palestine in 1924, later an Israeli politician
- Golda Meir (1898–1978), born in the Russian Empire (Ukraine), moved to Mandatory Palestine in 1921, former prime minister of Israel
- Samuel Mohilever (1824–1898), born in the Russian Empire (Belarus) Religious Zionist, a founder of the Hovevei Zion
- Max Nordau (1849–1923), born in the Austrian Empire (Hungary), involved in the foundation of the Zionist Organisation (later World Zionist Organisation)
- Erna Patak (1871–1955), Austrian social worker and women's activist
- Leon Pinsker (1821–1891), born in the Russian Empire (Poland), founder/leader of Hovevei Zion
- Ruth Popkin (1913–2015), led Hadassah and the Jewish National Fund
- Haviva Reik (1914–1944), parachutist born in the Kingdom of Hungary (Slovakia); member of underground Palmach (Haganah elite force) in Mandatory Palestine
- Isaac Rülf (1831–1902), Rabbi born in Hesse-Kassel (Germany), advocated a Jewish home in Palestine, became aware of the dangers from German antisemitism
- Arthur Ruppin (1876–1943), born in the German Empire (Prussia), moved to Palestine in 1907 and organized Jewish immigration
- Pinhas Rutenberg (1879–1942), born in the Russian Empire (Ukraine), engineer and activist, settled in Mandatory Palestine in 1919

== S–Z ==
- Solomon Schechter (1847–1915), born in the Principality of Moldavia (now Romania), rabbi, spokesman for Zionism within Conservative Judaism
- Moshe Sharett (1894–1965), born in the Russian Empire (Ukraine) settled in Ottoman Palestine in 1906, journalist and activist, later an Israeli politician
- Abraham Stern (1907–1942), born in the Russian Empire (Poland), immigrated to Mandatory Palestine in 1925, one of the leaders of the Irgun and Lehi militant group (sometimes known as the Stern gang)
- Sun Yat-sen (1866-1925), Chinese revolutionary and politician, founder of the Republic of China, supporter of Zionism
- Nachman Syrkin (also known as Nahum Syrkin, 1868–1924), born in the Russian Empire (Belarus), founder of Labor Zionism
- Hannah Szenes (1921–1944), born in Hungary, migrated to Mandatory Palestine, active in the Haganah, parachutist with the British SOE
- Henrietta Szold (1860–1945), Zionist leader and founder of Hadassah, the Women's Zionist Organization of America
- Bernice Tannenbaum (1913–2015), activist with Hadassah
- Joseph Trumpeldor (1880–1920), born in the Russian Empire, involved in the organisation of the Zion Mule Corps which assisted in Jewish immigration to Mandatory Palestine
- Menachem Ussishkin (1863–1941), born in the Russian Empire (Belarus), leader of the Jewish National Fund
- Chaim Weizmann (1874–1952), born in the Russian Empire (Belarus), biochemist, founder of Synthetic Zionism and first president of Israel
- Felix Weltsch (1884–1964), born in Bohemia (Czech Republic), librarian, philosopher, author, editor, publisher and journalist involved with the Zionist newspaper Selbstwehr (self-defense)
- Robert Weltsch (1891–1982), born in Prague (then Austria-Hungary, present-day Czech Republic), journalist and editor active in Brit Shalom
- Orde Wingate (1903–1944), non-Jewish British army officer who trained the Haganah
- L. L. Zamenhof (1859–1917), born in Białystok (then in the Russian Empire, now Poland), ophthalmologist and creator of Esperanto, briefly active in Hovevei Zion
- Israel Zangwill (1864–1926), British author, cultural Zionist involved in the Jewish Territorial Organization
- A. L. Zissu (1888–1956), Romanian writer and industrialist, Religious Zionist
- Baruch Zuckerman (1887–1970), American-Israeli Zionist, Yad Vashem proponent
