= Szold =

Szold is a surname. Notable people with the surname include:

- Benjamin Szold (1829–1902), Hungarian-American rabbi
- Henrietta Szold (1860–1945), founder of the Hadassah Women's Organization
- Nadia Szold (born 1984), filmmaker
- Robert Szold (1889–1977), American lawyer, Zionist movement leader
- Zip Szold (1888-1979), fourth president of the Hadassah Women's Zionist Organization of America

== See also ==
- Kfar Szold, a kibbutz in Israel, named after Henrietta Szold
