= Jessie Sampter =

American poet

- Born: March 22, 1883; New York City
- Died: November 25, 1938 (aged 55)
- Resting place: Givat Brenner, Israel
- Occupations: Educator, poet
- Writing career
- Language: English, Hebrew

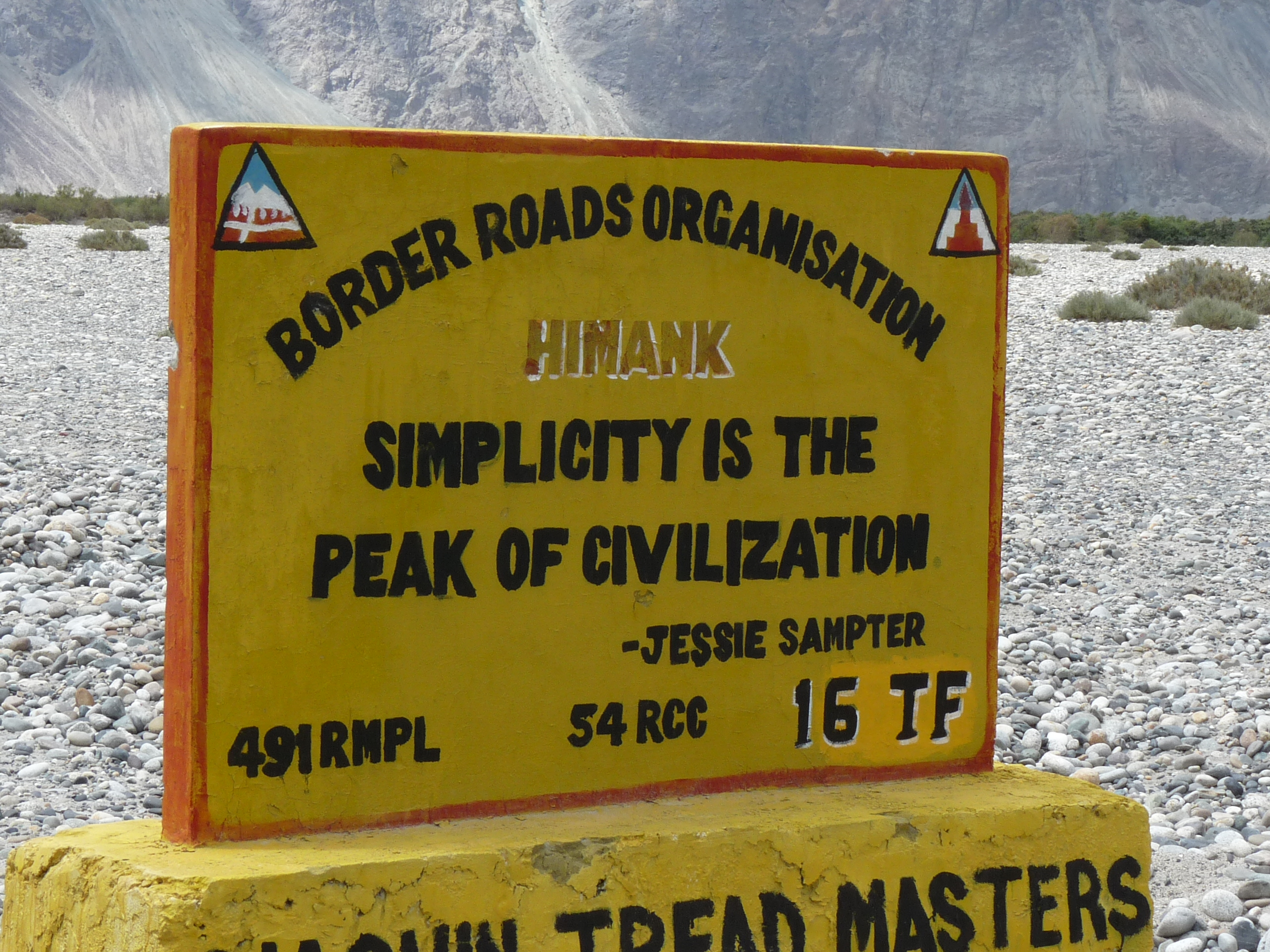
Jessie Sampter quotation on Himank BRO sign board in the Nubra Valley, Ladakh, Northern India

Jessie Sampter (March 22, 1883 – 1938) was a Jewish educator, poet, and Zionist pioneer. She was born in New York City and immigrated to Palestine in 1919.

== Biography ==
Jessie Ethel Sampter was born in New York City to Rudolph Sampter, a New York attorney, and Virginia Kohlberg Sampter, who maintained an assimilated Jewish home. She had one sister, Elvie. At the age of thirteen she contracted polio which prevented her from leaving home. Since she was unable to attend school her family hired tutors. Later she audited courses at Columbia University.

In her twenties she joined the Unitarian Church and began writing poetry. Her poems and short stories emphasized her primary concerns: pacifism, Zionism, and social justice. Around this time, she began spending time in the home of Henrietta Szold and began to appreciate the Eastern European Jews of New York City. She moved into a settlement house on the Lower East Side, then to a Young Women's Hebrew Association.

== Zionist activism ==
Assuming the role of Hadassah's leading educator, she produced manuals and textbooks and organized lectures and classes. She led Hadassah's School of Zionism, training speakers and leaders for both Hadassah and other Zionist organizations like the Federation of American Zionists (now the Zionist Organization of America). She composed educational manuals with Alice Seligsberg and edited a textbook on Zionism.

In 1919 she settled in Palestine where she helped organize the country's first Jewish Scout camp. Sampter developed a strong commitment to assisting Yemenite Jews, founding classes and clubs especially for Yemenite girls and women who often received no education. She adopted a Yemenite foundling and raised her with progressive education.

Sampter died at Beilinson Hospital at 10:00 am on Friday 25 November 1938 of malaria and heart disease and was buried at Givat Brenner the following Sunday afternoon, 27 November. At the time of her death she had established a vegetarian convalescent home at Kibbutz Givat Brenner. Szold presided at her funeral.

== Legacy ==
Sampter is one of several popular 'philosophers' whose quotations appear on the roadsigns of Project HIMANK in the Ladakh region of northern India.

== Published works ==
- The Seekers (1910)
- Nationalism and Universal Brotherhood (1914)
- A Course in Zionism (1915)
- The Books of Nations (1917)
- The Coming of Peace(1919)
- A Guide to Zionism(1920)
- Around the Year in Rhymes for the Jewish Child (1920)
- The Emek (1927)
- Modern Palestine: A Symposium (1933)
- Brand Plucked from the Fire (1937)
- Far Over the Sea: Poems and Jingles for Children by H.N. Bialik, translated by Jessie Sampter (1939)
