= ESCO Foundation for Palestine =

The ESCO Foundation for Palestine, or just ESCO Foundation, was a private Zionist family foundation set up in 1940 by Frank Cohen and named in honor of his wife Ethel Cohen. It was focused on Jewish projects in Mandatory Palestine, later Israel.

== Publication ==
One of its best known projects was the publication of Palestine - A Study Of Jewish Arab And British Policies in spring 1947, a two-volume 1350-page source document published by Yale University Press covering the history of Mandatory Palestine, primarily created by (although not attributed to) Isaac Baer Berkson. The work was used by the UNSCOP in their deliberations over the future of the region. The work for the study was begun on 18 April 1942, and the draft versions were used throughout the 1940s by Abba Hillel Silver's American Zionist Emergency Council.

== Members ==
"ESCO" is an acrostic for Ethel S. Cohen, one of the founders and the wife of Frank Cohen. Other members of the ESCO boards were: Irvin M. Berliner, Dr. Israel S. Chipkin, Mark Eisner, Marian Gerber Greenberg, Harry Handler, Dr. Leo Honor, Rose G. Jacobs (President), Dr. Mordecai M. Kaplan, Leah Klepper and Dr. Israel S. Wechsler. Henrietta Szold was an advisor to the foundation.

== Publications ==
- Palestine - A Study Of Jewish Arab And British Policies, Volume 1
- Palestine - A Study Of Jewish Arab And British Policies, Volume 2
