= Rae Landy =

Nursing pioneer (1885-1952)

Rae D. Landy
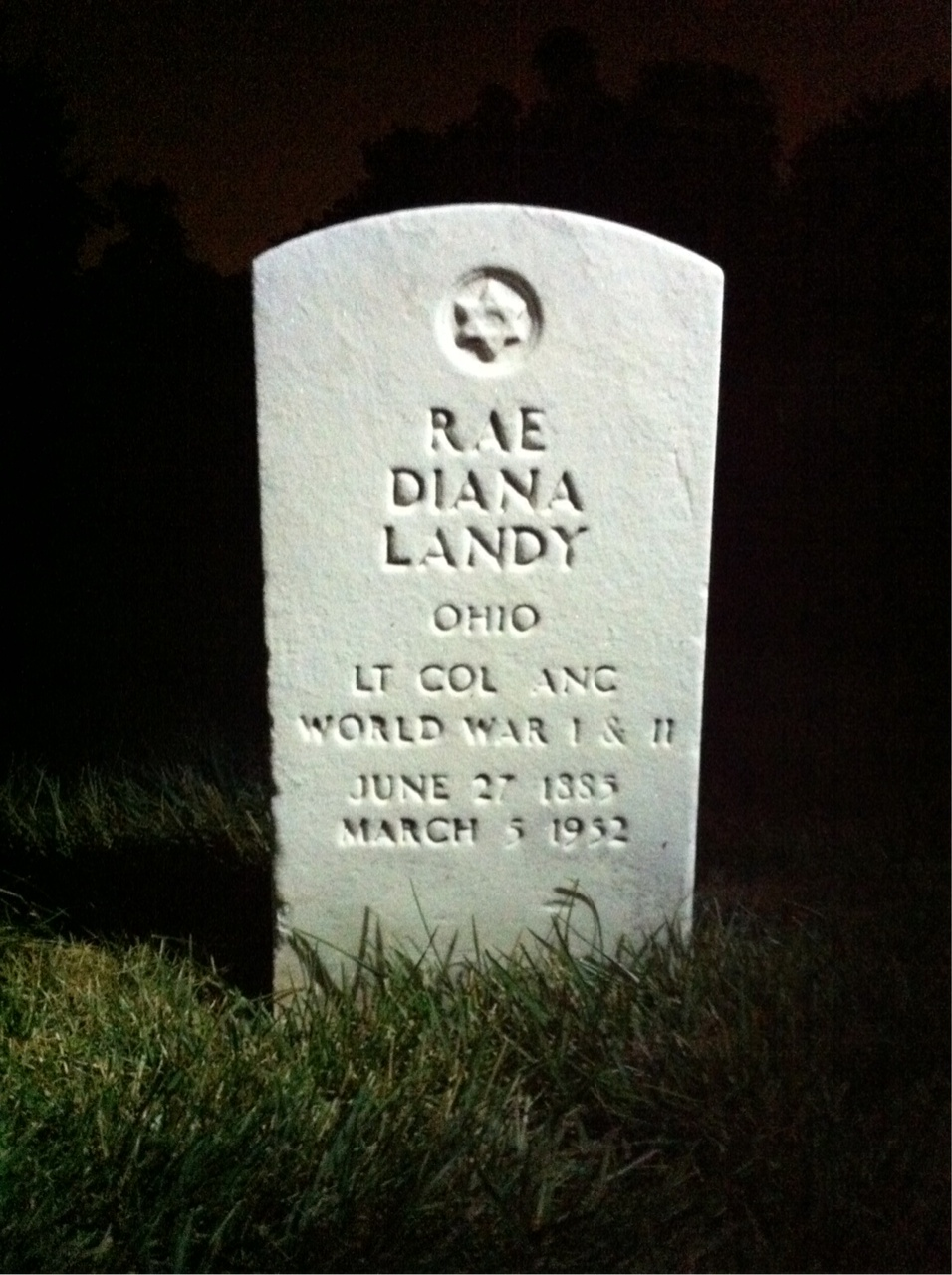
- Grave at Arlington National Cemetery
- Born: Rachel Diana Landy; June 27, 1885; Lithuania
- Died: March 5, 1952 (aged 66); Cleveland, Ohio
- Occupation: Nurse

Rae Landy (June 27, 1885, Lithuania – March 5, 1952, Cleveland, OH) was a nursing pioneer. She was one of the first two American nurses (along with Rose Kaplan) sent to Palestine by Hadassah in 1913.

== Early life ==
Landy (born Rachel) was the daughter of Rabbi Jacob and Eva (Gross) Landy. Together with her three sisters and three brothers, the family immigrated to Cleveland, Ohio, in 1888.

== Nursing career ==
In 1904, Landy was part of the first class of nursing students sponsored by the Jewish Women's Hospital Association (later Mount Sinai Hospital) in Cleveland. In 1913, Landy was personally recruited by Henrietta Szold, the founder of Hadassah, to travel to Palestine and start a visiting nurse service. Together with Rose Kaplan, Landy opened a settlement house to train young women in nursing, first aid, and hygiene. She remained in Palestine until the outbreak of World War One caused Hadassah to suspend the program.

Landy began her long career with the United States Army Nurse Corps in 1918. She served overseas with the American Expeditionary Forces in Germany, Belgium, and France, as well as in the Philippines during the 1930s. She rose through the ranks, serving at the headquarters of the Second Corps Area at Governors Island in New York and Crile General Hospital in Cleveland. She retired in 1944 as a lieutenant colonel, the second highest rank in the Army Nursing Corps. Landy is buried at Arlington National Cemetery.
