= Inbal Abergil =

Photographer and educator

Inbal Abergil (Hebrew: ענבל אברג'יל) is a documentary photographer and educator of North African descent. Her research focuses on the aftermath of war and the human cost of conflict, using still and moving images along with testimony to examine loss, grief, and healing. Her work is in the collection of the National Gallery of Art in Washington, D.C..

== Life and education ==
Abergil was born in Jerusalem. She attended Hadassah College and has a BFA from Midrasha School of Art. Abergil received her M.F.A. in Visual Arts from Columbia University.

== Collections ==
- National Gallery of Art, Washington, D.C.
- The Museum of Fine Arts, Houston, Tx.
- Israel Museum
- Fisher Landau Center for Art
- The American University Art Museum

== Exhibitions ==
- Houston Center for Photography
- Franklin D. Roosevelt Four Freedoms Park
- The Elizabeth Foundation for the Arts

== Awards ==
The Pollock-Krasner, New York City
