= Zemianske Sady =

Municipality in Trnava Region, Slovakia

- Municipality
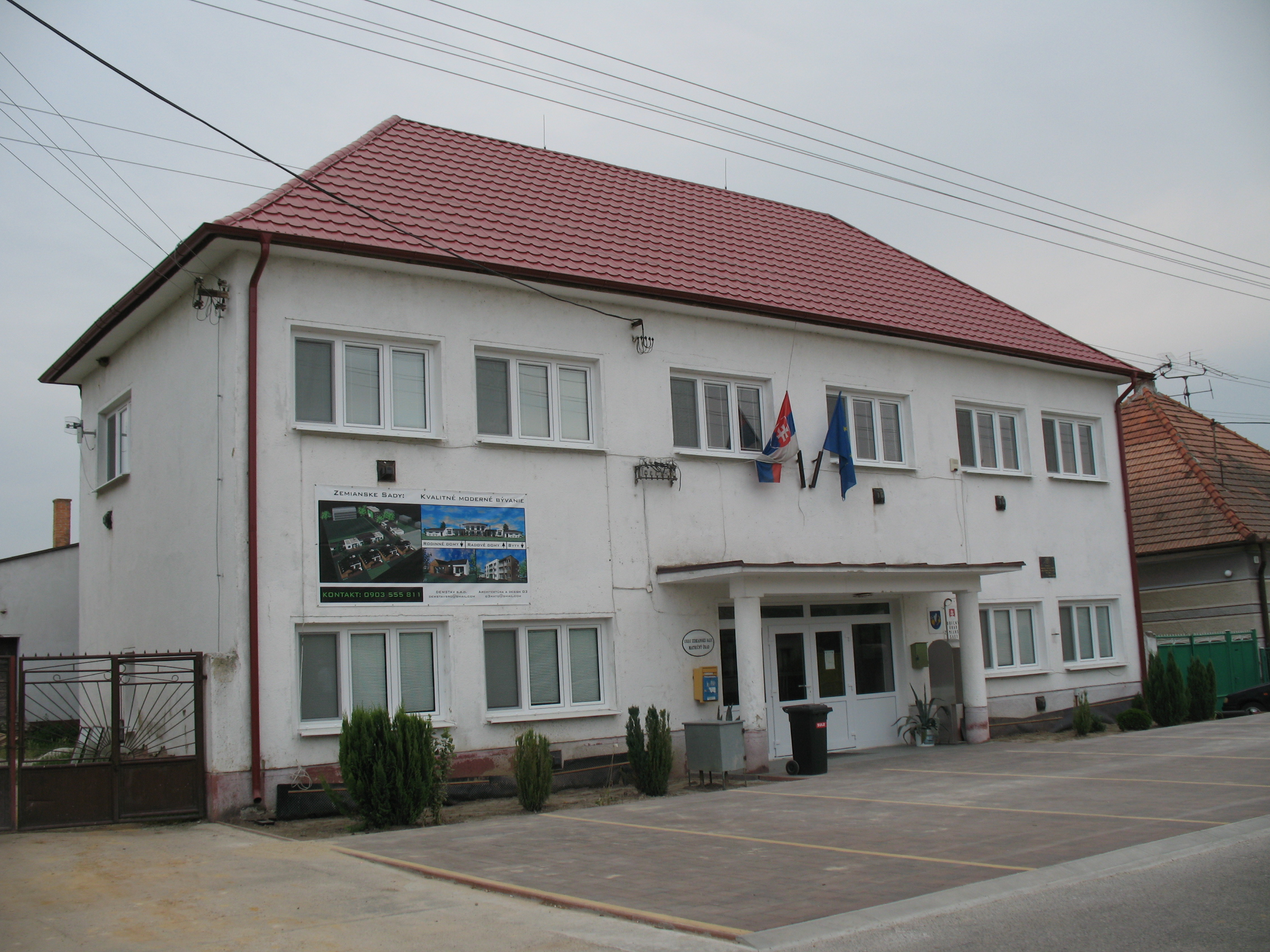

- Flag

- Location of Zemianske Sady in the Trnava Region Location of Zemianske Sady in Slovakia
- Coordinates: 48.33°N 17.82°E
- Country: Slovakia
- Region: Trnava Region
- District: Galanta District
- First mentioned: 1156

Area
  - Total: 8.05 km^{2} (3.11 sq mi)
- Elevation: 153 m (502 ft)

Population (2025)
  - Total: 845
- Time zone: UTC+1 (CET)
  - Summer (DST): UTC+2 (CEST)
- Postal code: 925 54
- Area code: +421 31
- Vehicle registration plate (until 2022): GA
- Website: zemianskesady.sk

Zemianske Sady (old form: Nemeškert; Hungarian: Nemeskürt) is a village and municipality in Galanta District of the Trnava Region of south-west Slovakia.

== History ==
In historical records the village was first mentioned in 1156. Before the establishment of independent Czechoslovakia in 1918, it was part of Nyitra County within the Kingdom of Hungary.

== Geography ==
The municipality lies at an altitude of 153 metres (502 ft) and covers an area of 8.05 km^{2} (3.11 sq mi) (2025).

== Population ==
Population statistic (10 years)
Year	1995	2005	2015	2025
Count	862	877	861	845
Difference		+1.74%	−1.82%	−1.85%

Population statistic
Year	2024	2025
Count	852	845
Difference		−0.82%

It has a population of 845 people (31 December 2025).

=== Ethnicity ===
Census 2021 (1+ %)
Ethnicity	Number	Fraction
Slovak	830	95.4%
Not found out	33	3.79%
Czech	9	1.03%
Total	870	

In year 2021 was 870 people by ethnicity 830 as Slovak, 33 as Not found out, 9 as Czech, 6 as Hungarian, 2 as Rusyn, 2 as Romanian, 1 as Ukrainian, 1 as Other and 1 as French.

Note on population: The difference values of population numbers in the table "Population statistic" and in the sections "Ethnicity" & "Religion" is caused by the use of various statistical methods.

=== Religion ===
Census 2021 (1+ %)
Religion	Number	Fraction
Roman Catholic Church	638	73.33%
None	159	18.28%
Not found out	30	3.45%
Christian Congregations in Slovakia	14	1.61%
Evangelical Church	10	1.15%
Total	870	

In year 2021 was 870 people by religion 638 from Roman Catholic Church, 159 from None, 30 from Not found out, 14 from Christian Congregations in Slovakia, 10 from Evangelical Church, 7 from Greek Catholic Church, 4 from Jehovah's Witnesses, 2 from Calvinist Church, 2 from Eastern Orthodox Church, 2 from Other, 1 from United Methodist Church and 1 from Ad hoc movements.

== People ==
- Benjamin Szold, father of Henrietta Szold
