= Miriam Freund-Rosenthal =

American civic leader (1906–1999)

Miriam Kottler Freund-Rosenthal
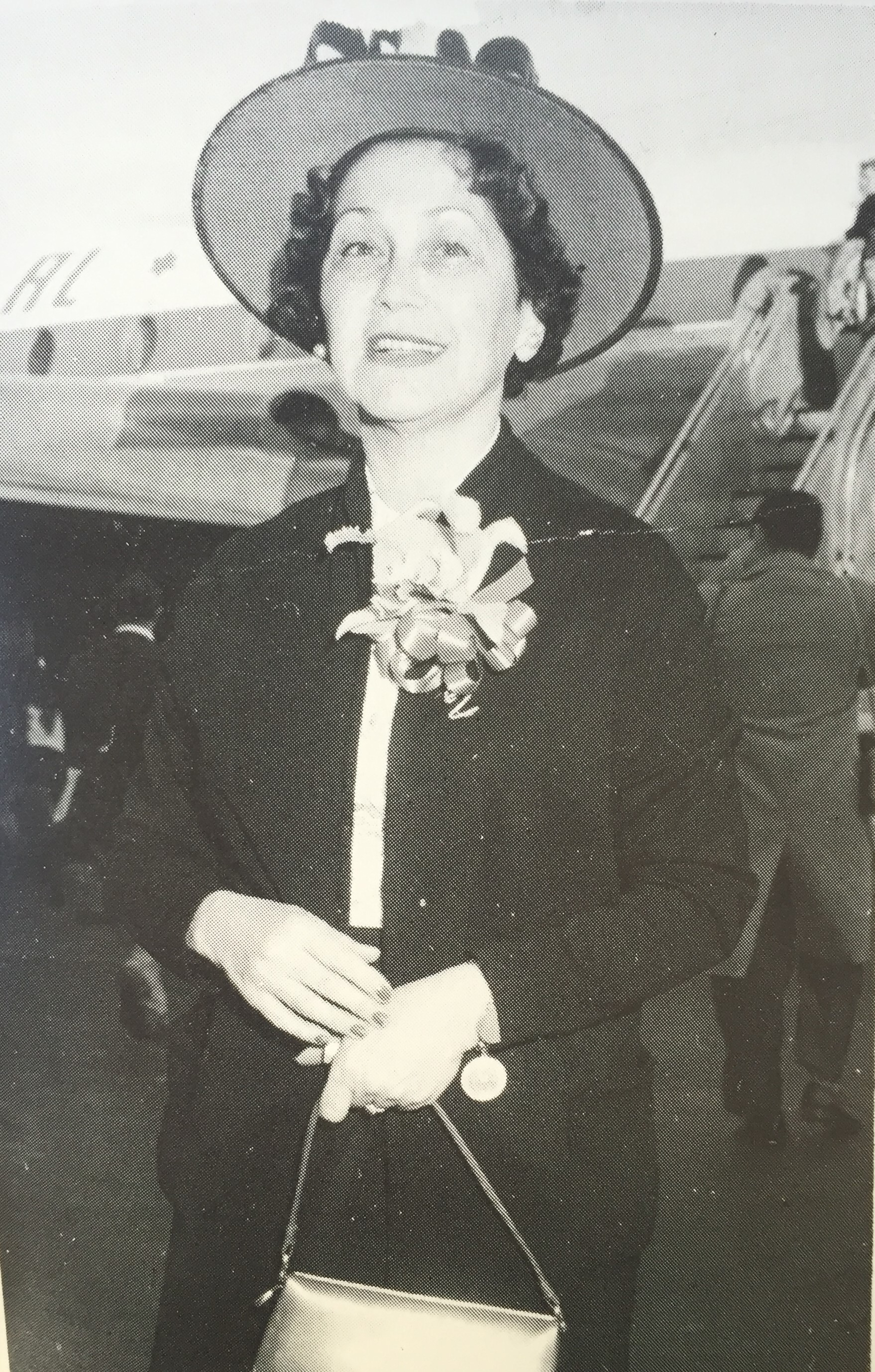
- Freund-Rosenthal in 1956
- Born: Miriam Kottler; 1906; Brooklyn, New York, U.S.
- Died: January 16, 1999 (aged 92); Miami Beach, Florida, U.S.
- Spouses: Milton B. Freund (m. 1927; died 1968) Harry Rosenthal (m. 1974; died 1989)

Miriam Kottler Freund-Rosenthal (1906 – January 16, 1999) was an American civic leader, best known for her contributions as President of the Hadassah Women's Zionist Organization of America.

== Personal life ==
Freund-Rosenthal was born in Brooklyn on January 1, 1906, and reared in Harlem and Perth Amboy, New Jersey. The child of Harry Kottler and Rebecca Zindler, a member of the first Zionist women’s group on the East Side, the Daughters of Zion. She earned her bachelor's degree from Hunter College in 1925, and went on to earn a master's degree and doctorate in American history from New York University in 1935, where she joined the sorority Alpha Epsilon Phi.

In 1927, she married Milton B. Freund, with whom she had two sons, Matthew and Harry, before his death of a heart attack in 1968. She remarried to Harry Rosenthal, an importer of men's sportswear, in 1974, and thereafter moved to his Saint Paul, Minnesota home.

In 1999, Freund-Rosenthal died in Miami Beach at the age of 92.

== Career ==
Freund-Rosenthal taught in the New York City Public Schools for 15 years until 1944. She also played a major role in raising the funds to found Brandeis University in 1948.

=== Hadassah ===
Throughout the latter half of 1930s, after her first trip to Israel, Freund-Rosenthal was asked to speak to Hadassah groups about her visit. In 1940, she was asked to join the national board of Hadassah Women's Zionist Organization of America. She left Hadassah in 1942 before resigning from her position as a public school teacher and returning to Hadassah in 1943, when she took over as the chair of the American Zionist Youth Commission. Between 1943 and 1956 she held a variety of Hadassah National Board positions including National Vocational Education chair, National Youth Aliyah chair, and Vice President.

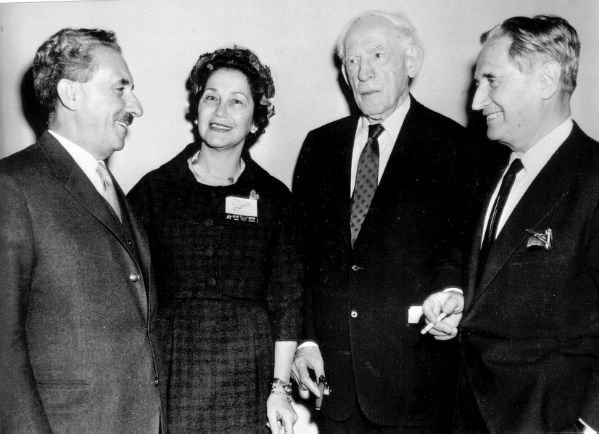
From left to right: Moshe Sharett, Miriam Freund, Louis Lipsky, and Nahum Goldmann, 1960

In 1956, Freund-Rosenthal was elected national president of Hadassah. During her four-year tenure, Hadassah built and dedicated its new medical center at Ein Karem in Jerusalem. At the time, the Jordanian annexation of the West Bank made the Hospital's original campus on Mount Scopus unusable and the hospital had been operating in a scattered set of temporary facilities. Freund-Rosenthal persuaded Marc Chagall to design and execute the twelve stained-glass windows symbolizing the twelve tribes of Israel for the medical center's synagogue, which have come to be known as the "Chagall windows." After her presidency, she held other board posts including the chair of Education, Zionist Affairs, Hadassah Magazine (from 1966 to 1971), two Youth Survey committees, and nongovernmental representative to the United Nations.

=== Post-Hadassah ===
Freund-Rosenthal continued her scholarly pursuits outside Hadassah. She was a founding member of the World Bible Society. She delivered a paper, "Medicine and the Hebraic Tradition," at the 25th International Congress of Orientalists. After moving to Saint Paul with her second husband, she helped create an educational endowment fund for National Hadassah. And in her late eighties, she spearheaded the compilation and editing of A Tapestry of Hadassah Memories, a collection of interviews and memoirs of Hadassah leaders. In 1991, she was elected an American regent of the International Center for University Teaching of Jewish Civilization.

== Books ==
- Jewish Merchants in Colonial America (1939). Freund-Rosenthal's doctoral thesis.
- Jewels for a Crown (1963). About the Chagall windows in Jerusalem.
- In My Lifetime: Family, Community, Zion, (1989). A memoir and nostalgic look at recent Zionist history.
- A Tapestry of Hadassah Memories (1994). Compiled by Freund-Rosenthal from the writing and memories of over 200 Hadassah members.
