= Benjamin Szold =

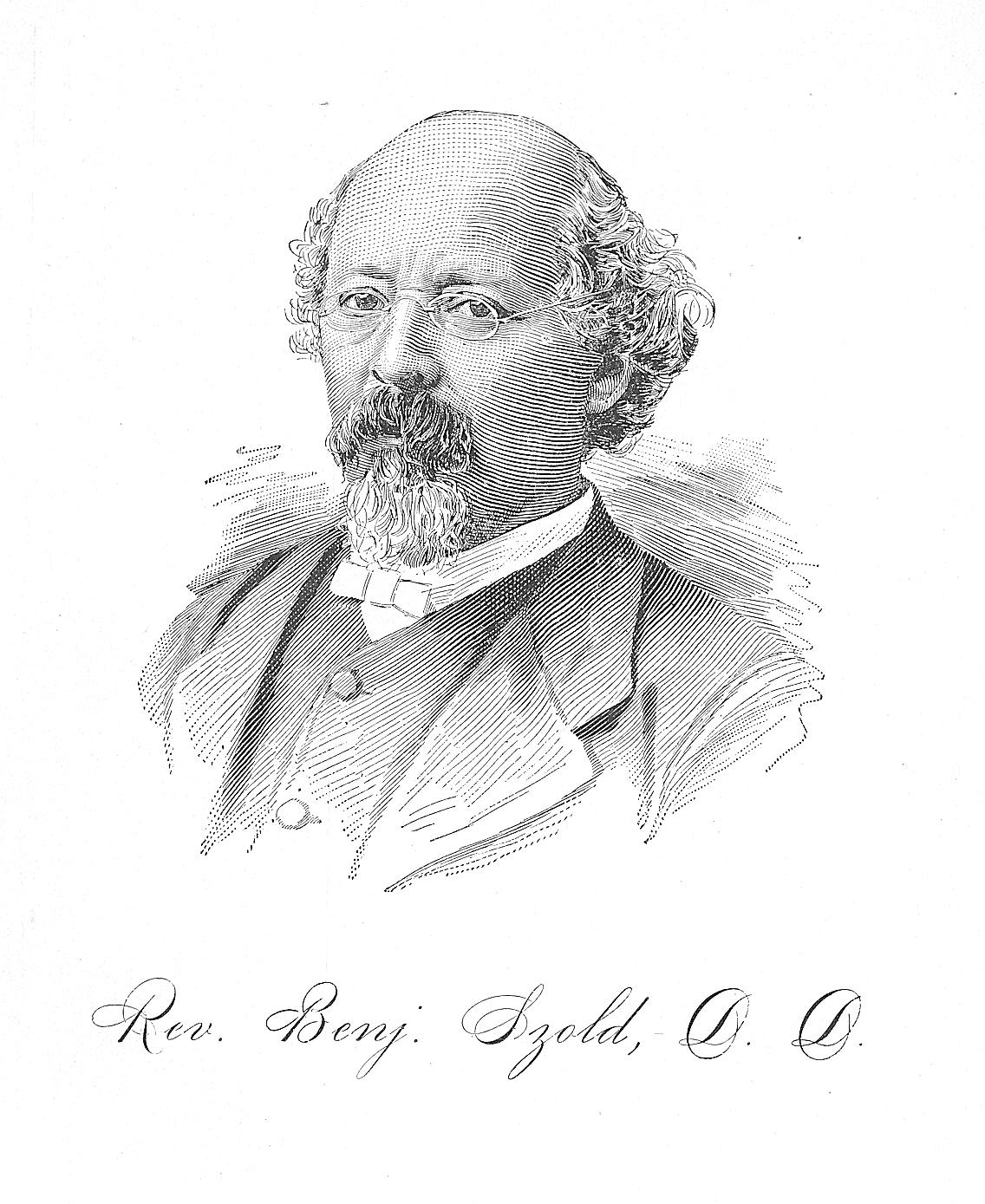
Benjamin Szold, 1887

Benjamin Szold (15 November 1829 in Nemes-Kürt Kingdom of Hungary, (now Zemianske Sady, Slovakia) – 31 July 1902 in Berkeley Springs, West Virginia) was an American rabbi and scholar.

== Education ==
Szold studied under Rabbis Jacob Fischer of Shalgaw, Wolf Kollin of Vrbové, and Benjamin Wolf Löw at the Pressburg Yeshiva, and received the semikhah from Judah Assod of Bur and Simon Sidon of Tyrnau. In 1848, he studied in Vienna, but when the revolution of that year broke out he went to Pressburg. From 1849 to 1855 he tutored privately in Hungarian families, and in the latter year enrolled at the Jewish Theological Seminary of Breslau and the University of Breslau, where he remained until 1858. While a student he officiated during the holy days at Brieg, Silesia (1857), and at Stockholm, Sweden (1858).

He served as rabbi for the Temple Oheb Shalom (Baltimore, Maryland) from 1859 to 1892, he served as rabbi emeritus from 1892 to his death. He arrived in the United States on September 21, 1859, about a month after his marriage to Sophie Schaar, and immediately took active charge of the congregation. Under his guidance it grew rapidly, and inspired by his example, it became widely known for its strict observance of Shabbat. Before Szold's arrival the congregation had adopted for use in its Shabbat service the Minhag America, a prayer book (siddur) written by Isaac Mayer Wise, a Reform rabbi. During the High Holy Days the congregation reverted to using Minhag Ashkenaz. After much discussion with his congregation Szold introduced a new prayer-book, Abodat Yisrael, which closely followed traditional lines. The first edition of this prayer-book appeared in 1863, with German translation, and was widely adopted by congregations in the United States. New editions were published in 1864 and 1865, the latter with an English translation, and another, revised edition appeared in 1871. Rabbis Marcus Jastrow of Philadelphia and Henry Hochheimer of Baltimore collaborated with Szold on its publication.

== Career ==
During his entire career Szold opposed radicalism, and fought against the extreme tendencies that had already manifested themselves when he arrived in the United States. He took a prominent part in communal life, and besides helping establish the charitable institutions of Baltimore, he devoted himself to helping Russian refugees who had emigrated to America because of the May Laws. He was in sympathy with the nationalist (later Zionist) movement, speaking in its favor as early as the winter of 1893–94 before the Zion Society of Baltimore. As an exegete he developed a subtle and original system in which full account was taken of the work of the Masorites. His "Commentary on Job" (Baltimore, 1886), written in classical Hebrew and conceived in an original and deeply Jewish spirit, attests to the accuracy of his scholarship. His publications include articles in Jewish and secular periodicals, as well as sermons, lectures, religious school-books, and devotional literature. He also wrote a commentary on the eleventh chapter of Daniel (Kohut Memorial Volume), edited "Bibelkritische Notizen" by Michael Heilprin, and published a sketch of Moses Mendelssohn on the occasion of the 150th anniversary of his birth. He left numerous manuscripts.

His daughter Henrietta was a translator, editor, philanthropist, educator, Zionist leader and the founder of Hadassah. Her younger sister Adele Szold-Seltzer (1876–1940) was the translator of the first American edition of Maya the Bee. It was published in 1922 by her husband Thomas Seltzer.

== See also ==
- Henrietta Szold
- Robert Szold (Cousin of Henrietta Szold)
- Zip Szold (Wife of Robert Szold)

== External sources ==
- Goldman, Yosef. Hebrew Printing in America, 1735–1926, A History and Annotated Bibliography (YGBooks 2006).
- "Benjamin_Szold" Jewish Encyclopedia
- [Wilhelm, Kurt]. Benjamin Szold and the Rabbinical Post in Stockholm in 1858. With An Unpublished Letter of Isaac M. Wise. In: Historia Iudaica, N.Y., 1953, 1, pp. 49–58
