= Jerusalem Multidisciplinary College =

Public college in Jerusalem, Israel

Coordinates: 31.7834°N 35.2212°E

- המרכז האקדמי הרב תחומי ירושלים
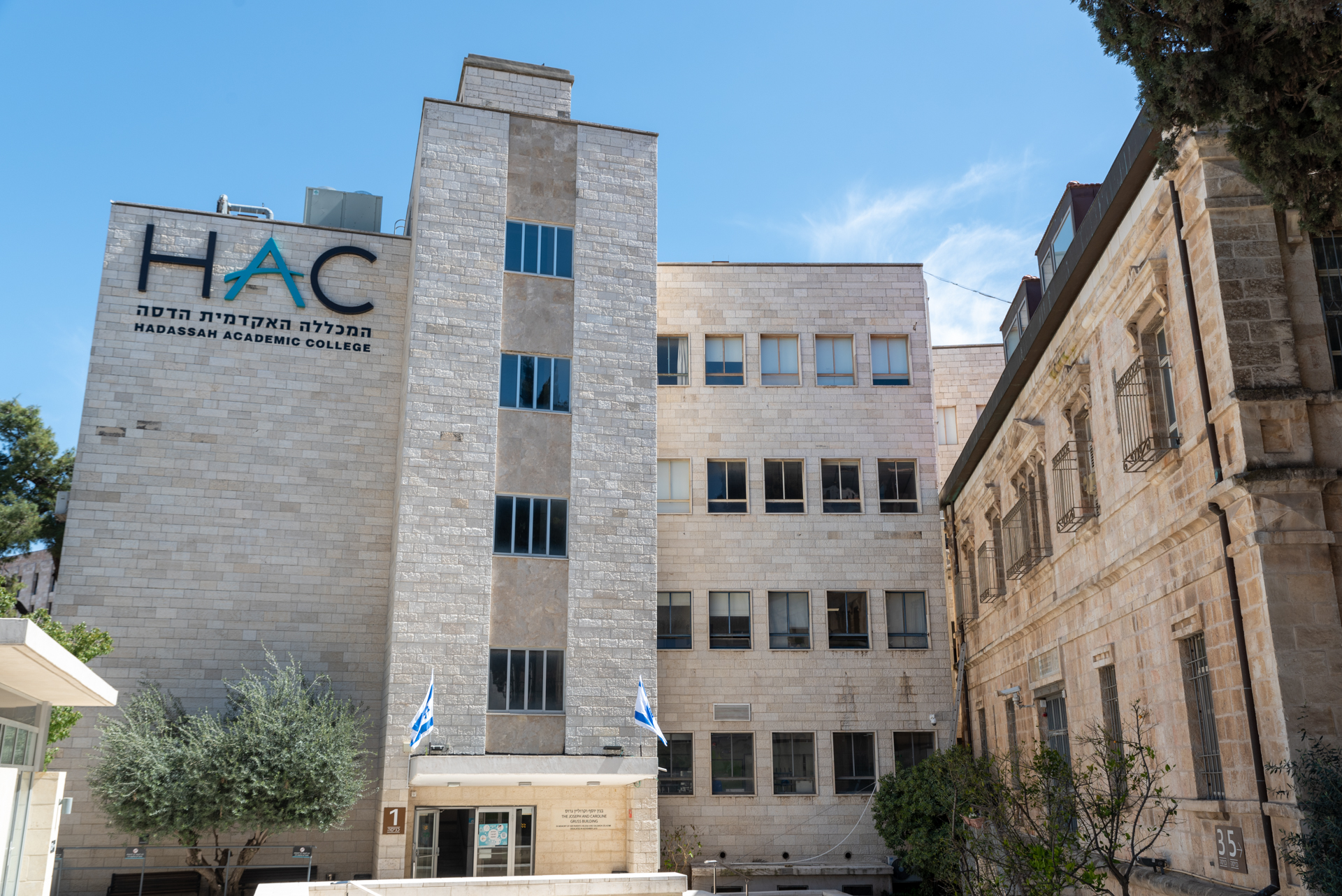
- Former name: Hadassah Academic College
- Type: Public college
- Established: 1970
- Location: Jerusalem
- Campus: Urban
- Website: jmc.ac.il/en/

Jerusalem Multidisciplinary College (Hebrew: המרכז האקדמי הרב תחומי ירושלים; formerly HAC, Hadassah College of Technology) is a publicly funded college in Jerusalem.

== History ==
Hadassah College of Technology was established in 1970 to meet the changing needs in Israel for trained professionals. Its name came from Hadassah, an American Jewish organization which provided financial assistance. HAC officially opened in 1972. HAC became a degree-granting institution in 1996 and was accredited by the Israel Council for Higher Education in 1998.

The historic main building, dating to 1888, was donated by the Rothschild family and became the site of Hadassah Hospital, which first opened in the Old City in 1854 as the Rothschild Hospital. An inscription above the door reads “Hôpital Israélite Meyer Rothschild,” and the name of the institution appears in Hebrew, English and Arabic on the gatepost. The building later housed the Seligsberg Vocational School for Girls.

According to Israel's Council of Higher Education, in the 2020–2021 academic year the college had a student population of over 4,000.

In 2025, HAC officially rebranded as Jerusalem Multidisciplinary College.

== Structure ==
Studies take place in one of HAC's two schools: the Interdisciplinary School for Science, Health, and Society which prepares students for Israel's healthcare and science-based sectors; and the Interdisciplinary School for Society and Community which trains students for positions in the business and public sectors.

The Azrieli Center for Diversity and Inclusion in Higher Education and Employment, established with support from the Azrieli Foundation and the Russell Berrie Foundation, supports underserved populations to ensure their integration into the world of higher education, and prepare them for successful entry into the workforce. The Blender, an innovation and entrepreneurship center, was launched in 2021 in collaboration with the Jerusalem Development Authority.

The current president of the college is Prof. Ariela Gordon.

== Degrees ==
HAC awards the following degrees:

=== Bachelor's degrees ===
- BA in Behavior Sciences
- BSc in Biotechnology
- BA in Communication Disorders
- BSc in Computer Science
- BA in Economics and Accounting
- BSc in Environmental Quality Sciences
- BA in Health Systems Management
- B.Des in Inclusive Industrial Design
- BA in Management
- B.Med.Lab.Sc in Medical Laboratory Sciences
- B.Optom in Optometry
- BA in Photographic Communication
- BA in Politics and Communication
- BSW in Social Work

=== Master's degrees ===
- MA in Communication Disorders
- MSc in Computer Science
- M.Optom in Optometry and Vision Sciences
- MA in Service Organization Management

== See also ==
- List of Israeli universities and colleges
- Education in Israel
