= Bernice Tannenbaum =

American activist

Bernice Tannenbaum (6 November 1913 – 6 April 2015) was an activist with Hadassah. She joined Hadassah in 1944. She was Hadassah's president from 1976 until 1980, and while president she began Hadassah's practice of periodically holding its annual convention in Israel, with the first such Jerusalem held gathering in 1978. She was chairwoman of the Hadassah Medical Organization from 1980 to 1984.

In 1983 Tannenbaum established Hadassah International. She also lobbied against a statement equating Zionism with racism which was included in an annex to a report to be considered at the final conference of the United Nations Decade for Women in 1985 in Nairobi, Kenya. As stated in It Takes a Dream: The Story of Hadassah (1997), by Marlin Levin, "Bernice asked [President Ronald] Reagan to publicly repudiate the U.N. resolution. He agreed and promised that the U.S. delegation would walk out of Nairobi if the Zionism-equals-racism resolution was included in the final conference declaration." Tannenbaum also convinced the United States Senate to condemn the conference resolution and demand its withdrawal. She also flew to Kenya with a draft of the Senate resolution, where Maureen Reagan, the daughter of President Reagan and the head of the American delegation, repeated the president's promise to withdraw from the conference if the resolution was included in the final conference delegation. Kenya then brokered a compromise in which Zionism was omitted from the final conference report. In 2003 Tannenbaum was awarded Hadassah's highest honor, the Henrietta Szold Award for Distinguished Humanitarian Service.
