= Sophie Rabinoff =

Jewish pediatrician, public health educator, and researcher (1899–1957)

- Born: 1899
- Died: 1957 (aged 57–58)

Sophie Rabinoff (1899–1957) was a Jewish pediatrician, public health educator, and researcher. She was known for her contributions to the field of preventative medicine.

Sophie served as a health official in various hospitals and centers in New York including New York Department of Health and New York Medical College. She was the first female physician on house staff at Mount Sinai Beth Israel and the only female physician in the American Zionist Medical Unit in Israel during World War I.

== Life ==
Rabinoff was born to Jewish parents Louis and Rose Rabinoff in Mogeileff, Russia (now Belarus) on May 19, 1889. Immediately after birth, the family relocated ro New York, US. She had a brother, George Rabinoff, and three sisters, Clara Rabinoff Carson, Jeannie Rabinoff and Eva Rabinoff Goalwin.

She attended New York public schools, then Hunter College from 1906 - 1908, and then went to Woman's Medical College of Pennsylvania (now Drexel University College of Medicine) receiving her medical degree in 1913. Rabinoff was the first female intern at Beth Israel Hospital in New York (now Mount Sinai Beth Israel), going on to complete a three-year residency in Pediatrics.

In 1945 Rabinoff received a master's degree in public health from Columbia University. She lived at 166 East 96th street in New York City and died in 1957 at the age of 68.

== Career ==
=== New York City ===
In 1913 Rabinoff became the first female intern on house staff at Mount Sinai Beth Israel (then Beth Israel Hospital) Hospital "triumphing over thirty men in a competitive examination". Initially told by the hospital that women are not eligible for appointment, the hospital later agreed to allow her to sit for the examination, at which she came in first place.

In 1915 Rabinoff and Dr. Alfred F. Hess attempted to prophylacticly immunize children against mumps and chickenpox at the Hebrew Infant Asylum where Rabinoff was a physician. Children who never had mumps received injections from the blood of mumps patients and were then placed in mumps wards. This experiment yielded resounding success to stem the spread of Chickenpox through vaccines and led to others copying this method including Chicago's Home for Jewish Friendless.

From 1918 - 1919, she worked on the first large-scale project on the use of Diphtheria toxin, Antitoxin, and Toxoid.

From 1919 - 1934, Rabinoff ran the pediatric clinic at Mount Sinai Hospital (Manhattan). In addition, she maintained a private medical practice specializing in Pediatrics and in the 1930s was the cardiologist for the New York Infirmary for Women and Children. In 1934, Rabinoff began working with the New York Department of Public Health, organizing health center programs on the Lower East and West side.

In 1938, Rabinoff became the Health Officer for the East HarlemHealth District. In 1944 she was put in charge of the Tremont, Fordham, Riverdale district of The Bronx. One initiative she led was instituting chest X-rays for visitors to Bronx Park.

In 1946, she led the campaign to reduce infant mortality in East Harlem for the New York Department of Public Health.

She was also the leader of the Benjamin Franklin Community Advisory Council's Health Committee and Director of the Health Center. She was noted as a "potent force" for improved health and sanitation.

=== Teaching career ===
In 1939 Rabinoff taught as a Clinical Instructor in public health for New York Medical College, supervising fieldwork for senior medical students. When she returned to East Harlem in 1951 to take a teaching position at Flower and Fifth Avenue Hospital.

She retired in June 1956 as a professor of Public Health and Industria; Medicine and Director of the Department of Public Health at New York Medical College, and died there in October 1957 at the age of 68.

=== Israel ===
Due to her specialized training, in June 1918, Rabinoff was selected by Henrietta Szold to join the American Zionist Medical Unit in Israel, serving with the British forces in World War I. She was the only female physician in the unit. There she helped organize hospitals and clinics for Arab and Jewish children in Jerusalem and Jaffa focusing on treating Malaria.

Rabinoff returned to the United States in 1919 where she published a medical paper on her experience there, Some Experience with Malaria Among Children in Palestine, presenting it at the New York Academy of Medicine in December 1919.

== Advocacy ==
After retiring in 1956, Rabinoff continued working with the East Harlem Council for Community Planning and Public Health Committee of New York County Medical Society.

Rabinoff also continued raising money for various Jewish philanthropies.

== Awards and associations ==
In 1957 Rabinoff received the Achievement Award of the Alumnae Association of Woman's Medical College.

She was named a Diplomate of the American Board of Preventive Medicine and Public Health.

She was a member of the American Public Health Association, Women's Medical Association of New York City and New York State, American Medical Association, Women's City Club of New York, and New York Academy of Medicine.
