= Faye Schenk =

American Zionist activist and leader

Faye L. Schenk (August 17, 1909 – August 17, 1981) was an American Zionist activist and leader. She was the president of Hadassah (American Zionist Federation) from 1968 to 1972. She was also the president of the American Zionist Federation from 1974 to 1978.

== Early life and education ==
Schenk was born in Des Moines, Iowa, to Naphtali Herz Zeichik and Rebecca (Zeichick). Schenk received her bachelor's and master's degrees in genetics from Drake University.

== Life ==
Schenk married Rabbi Max Schenk in 1933. For ten years between 1939 and 1949, she and her husband, Rabbi Max Schenk, lived in Australia. During her time in Australia, Schenk was active in the Women's International Zionist Organization. On the couples return to live in New York City, Schenk started becoming much more active in Hadassah. She originated the New York chapter located in the Washington Heights area. During her time in the Hadassah organization Schenk at one time held every major office there. She subsequently held the office of national president from 1968 to 1972. While she was the president, Hadassah began to start the restoration and rebuilding of its hospital at Mount Scopus. Faye Schenk testified at US Congressional committee meetings so that Hadassah could receive a five million dollar (USD) grant, in order to be used for the rebuilding of the hospital at Mount Scopus in Jerusalem. Schenk moved to Israel in 1978.

== Other leadership roles ==
- President of the American Zionist Federation
- Co-chair of Keren Hayesod–United Jewish Appeal
- Vice-chair of the National Council of the American-Israel Public Committee
- Member of the board of governors for the Hebrew University
- Member of the board of governors for the Jewish Agency

== Later years ==
In September 1970, Schenk survived the El Al airplane hijacking. Schenk said about the incident, “Life owes me nothing more. I owe life everything.”

The Hebrew Union College–Jewish Institute of Religion gave the honorary degree of doctor of humane letters to Schenk in 1974.

== Death ==
Schenk had a heart attack and died in Israel on August 17, 1981. She was buried in Jerusalem on the Mount of Olives.
