= Robert Szold =

American lawyer

- Born: September 29, 1889; Streator, Illinois, United States
- Died: November 9, 1977 (aged 88); New York City
- Education: Knox College
- Alma mater: Harvard Law School
- Occupation(s): Lawyer, government legal counselor
- Years active: 1915–1960
- Employer(s): Szold, Brandwen, Meyers and Altman (AKA Lowenthal, Szold and Brandwen)
- Known for: Zionist Organization of America chairman
- Movement: Zionism
- Spouse: Zip Szold
- Parent(s): Adolph Szold, Rachel Esther Gumbiner
- Relatives: Henrietta Szold, Benjamin Szold

Robert Szold (1889–1977) was a 20th-century American lawyer, best known as a champion for the reform of child labor law and as a Zionist movement leader as well as a founding partner of Szold, Brandwen, Meyers and Altern (1918).

== Background ==
Robert Szold was born on September 29, 1889, in Streator, Illinois. His parents were merchants: Adolph Szold of Berehove, Zakarpatska, Ukraine, and Rachel Esther Gumbiner of Poland. He had three siblings. In 1909, he received a BA from Knox College. In 1912, he received a law degree with honors from Harvard University.

== Career ==
In 1915, Szold was appointed Assistant Attorney General of Puerto Rico under United States Solicitor General John W. Davis until 1918. A brief that Szold wrote at that time led to the first-ever U.S. federal child labor law.

In 1918, Szold returned to private practice and helped found the law firm of Szold, Brandwen, Meyers and Altman. (At some time during the early 1920s, the firm was known as Lowenthal, Szold and Brandwen of 43 Exchange Place, New York City. Lowenthal (1888–1971) became a director of the Amalgamated Bank and, later, a close advisor to U.S. President Harry S. Truman. Brandwen (1896–1986) became general counsel to the Amalgamated Clothing Workers of America and a managing director of Amalgamated Bank.) His clients included the Amalgamated Clothing Workers of America, led by Sidney Hillman. He also served as president of the United Housing Foundation.

In 1919, Szold became friends with United States Supreme Court Justice Louis Brandeis. That year, he also traveled to British Mandatory Palestine as a member of the Zionist Commission with his friend Harry Friedenwald. In 1920, he traveled to London with Július Šimon and Nehemia de Lieme as a member of the Reorganization Committee. Around that time, he found himself ousted as part of the Brandeis-Mack faction by Chaim Weizmann faction.

In 1930, the Brandeis-Mack faction returned to power, and Szold became chairman of the Zionist Organization of America through 1932. In this position, he drafted the certificate of incorporation of the Palestine Endowment Funds, Inc., for the Hebrew University.

In 1937, Szold opposed the partition of Palestine.

In 1942, Szold became treasurer and chairman of the budget committee of the American Emergency Committee for Zionist Affairs.

In 1943, Szold became the first American Zionist leader to visit the British Mandate of Palestine since the United States of America entered World War II.

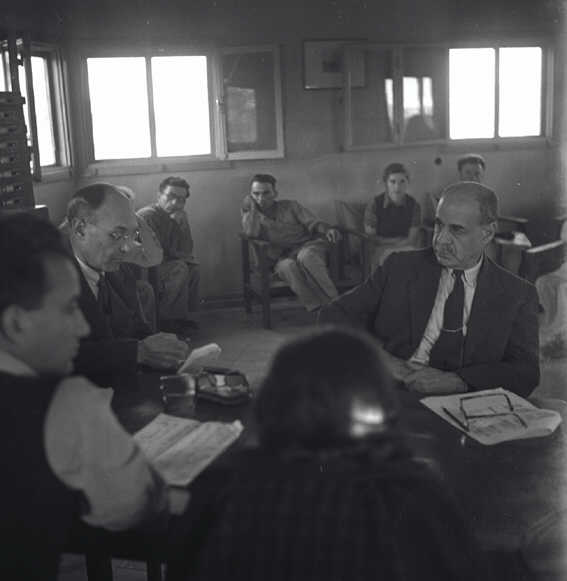
Robert Szold on visit to Ramat Hashofet 1943

In 1945, Szold began serving as chairman of the board of the Palestine Economics Corporation through 1960.

In 1946, at the 22nd World Zionist Congress, Szold supported Weizmann (against Abba Hillel Silver) to negotiate with the British.

In addition to the above organizations, Szold served as a director for the Riverbay Corporation, East River Housing Corporation, and Edward A. Filene Good Will Fund. He was also an officer of the Hillman Housing Corporation and vice chairman of Council of Jewish Agency

== Personal life and death ==
On September 4, 1917, Szold married Zip Falk. They had four daughters: Miriam, Ruth, Betty, and Joan.

Szold was a third cousin of Henrietta Szold, whose father was Rabbi Benjamin Szold.

Szold died age 88 on November 9, 1977, in New York City at the Columbia Presbyterian Medical Center.

== Awards ==
- 1956/1966: Honorary Doctorate of Humane Letters from Brandeis University
- 1966: Solomon Bublick Award
- 1972: Honorary Juris Doctor from Hebrew University

== Legacy ==
In April 1966, the Hebrew University opened the Robert Szold Institute of Applied Science in his name. The Palestine Endowment Funds, Inc., of which he was president, endowed the institute with $500,000. Louis Mintz, an Anglo-Jewish philanthropist, was believed to have donated more than $250,000 anonymously.

== Works ==
- The Proposed Partition of Palestine (1937)
- Zionism: Its Cardinal Principle (address at the joint session of the Convention of the Zionist Organization of America and of Hadassah, the Women's Zionist Organization of America) (1942)
- War time Palestine (1944)
- The State of Israel in International Law: A Historical Survey (1958)
- A Galaxy of American Zionist Rishonim: Dr. Harry Friedenwald (1962)
- 77 Great Russell Street: Recollections of Robert Szold (1967)

== External sources ==
- New York Times: image of Szold
