= Rose G. Jacobs =

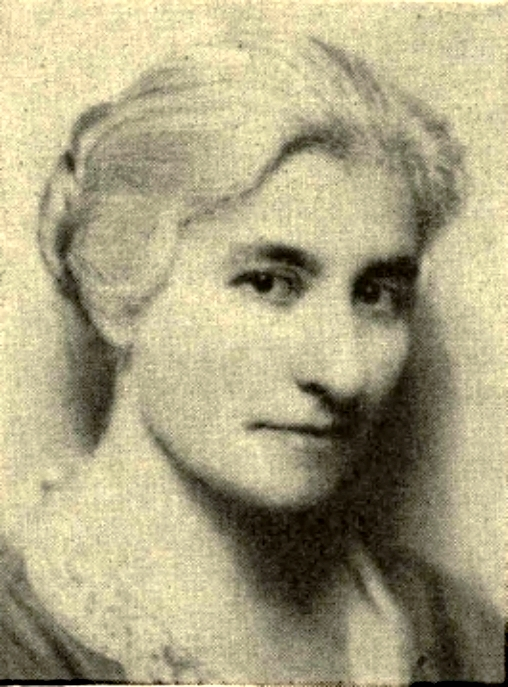
Rose G. Jacobs, 1930

Rose Gell Jacobs (1888-1975) was a founding member and two-term president of Hadassah Women's Zionist Organization of America.

== Biography ==
Rose Gell Jacobs was born on September 10, 1888, in New York City. She attended Columbia University and worked as a public school teacher until 1914. As a Hadassah founding member, she established chapters and edited the Hadassah News Bulletin. In 1920, she served as acting president of Hadassah while Henrietta Szold was in Palestine. She served two terms as official national president of Hadassah, from 1930 to 1932 and from 1934 to 1937. During her second term, she committed Hadassah fundraising efforts to Youth Aliyah. After her terms as president, she was involved in the Hadassah Emergency Committee and the building of the Rothschild-Hadassah University Hospital and Medical School on Mount Scopus.

Additionally, Jacobs was involved with the Committee for the Study of Arab-Jewish Relations, ESCO Foundation, Jewish Telegraphic Agency, and the Jewish Agency for Palestine.

Jacobs and her husband Edward had two children.
