= Paul Friedmann =

German philanthropist and Zionist (1840–c. 1900)

Paul Friedmann (26 April 1840 – c. 1900) was a German philanthropist and an early Zionist.

== Biography ==
Friedmann was born in Königsberg to a Jewish family, but converted to Christianity. He was related to Moses Mendelssohn. He was a resident of Berlin but spent much of his life in London.

Much distressed over the fate of the Russian Jews after the persecutions of 1882–1890, he resolved to found a Jewish state in the Arabian peninsula. Towards this end, he consulted with Sir Evelyn Baring (later Lord Cromer, the British representative in Egypt) and purchased land in the Midian region for a Jewish colony. He assembled a group of 30 Jews, mainly refugees from Russia, appointing a Prussian officer to lead it.

Friedmann had a steamboat (S.S. Israel) built in Scotland, and went to Kraków personally to select the first immigrants. Twenty-four of these, under the leadership of Friedmann, Baron von Seebach and Lieutenant Thiele, with a doctor, a chemist and a builder, left Cairo in the middle of November 1891.

A landing was made at Sharm al-Moza on the east side of the Gulf of Aqaba, but the new colony did not last for more than two months. Internal dissensions broke out between the leaders, who were all Christians, and the Jews. The project was viewed with "considerable anxiety" in Constantinople.

Friedmann, who had sunk 170,000 marks in the project, brought suit against the Egyptian government for £25,000. The Russian consul in Cairo also opened an investigation, and violent denunciatory articles appeared in the Egyptian press, especially in connection with the death of one of the settlers who had been forced to leave the encampment because of insubordination. In connection with the venture, Friedmann privately published Das Land Madian (Berlin, 1891).
