= Ruth Popkin =

Ruth Popkin (13 June 1913 – 2 January 2015) led Hadassah and the Jewish National Fund. In 1978 she was co-chair of Hadassah’s first national convention in Israel. She was president of Hadassah from 1984 to 1988 and served as a Hadassah delegate to seven Zionist Congresses from 1966 to 2002. She was president of the Jewish National Fund from 1989 until 1993.

She was also the first woman to be Chair of the Presidium and President of the World Zionist Congress, being elected to both positions in 1987.

The Hebrew University-Hadassah School of Medicine has a Ruth and Morris Popkin Chair in Health Administration, and the dining room at the Hadassah Neurim Youth Village is named for Ruth Popkin.
