= Zip Szold =

Zipporah Szold (née Falk, 1888–1979) was the fourth president of the Hadassah Women's Zionist Organization of America, serving from 1928 to 1930.

== Background ==
Zipporah Falk was born in Savannah, Georgia, in 1888. She studied at Bryn Mawr College and graduated in 1909.

== Career ==
Szold's achievements during her time as Hadassah president included fundraising for the Hadassah Hospital on Mount Scopus in Jerusalem and working to increase awareness related to Palestine at the time. She also edited the Hadassah Newsletter and served as the United Nations chairwoman for the organization.

== Personal life ==
Zip Falk married Robert Szold, Henrietta Szold's cousin and president of the Zionist Organization of America. Robert Szold was also a partner in Lowenthal, Szold and Brandwen of 43 Exchange Place, New York City.

Szold died 1979 in New York City at the age of 91.

== See also ==
- Robert Szold
- Henrietta Szold
- Benjamin Szold
