= Alice Seligsberg =

Alice Lillie Seligsberg (August 8, 1873 – August 27, 1940) was an American Zionist, social worker, and president of Hadassah Women's Zionist Organization of America from 1921 to 1923.

== Early life and education ==
Alice Seligsberg was born on August 8, 1873, in New York to Louis and Lillie (Wolff) Seligsberg. Her parents were affiliated with the Ethical Culture Movement, and the values of this movement guided Seligsberg throughout her life and career. She graduated from Barnard College with a bachelor's degree in 1895 and did graduate work at Columbia University and Friedrich Wilhelm University in Berlin.

== Work with Hadassah, the Women's Zionist Organization of America ==
In 1918, Hadassah, the Women's Zionist Organization of America founded the American Zionist Medical Unit, with Alice Seligsberg in charge of its administration. From 1921 to 1923, she served as Hadassah's national president. She was later an honorary associate of the national board. In 1920, Seligsberg was instrumental in founding Junior Hadassah; she served as an adviser to Junior Hadassah from 1924 until her death.
