= Hadassah (organization) =

Jewish-American volunteer women's organization

Hadassah, The Women's Zionist Organization of America
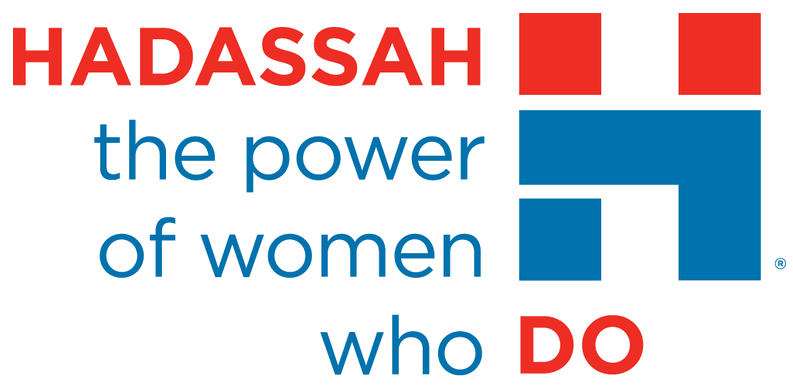
- Founded: 1912; 114 years ago
- Founder: Henrietta Szold
- Type: 501(c)(3)
- Purpose: Hadassah Medical Organization, Youth Aliyah villages, women's empowerment, Women's rights, reproductive rights, tikkun olam, public health, Middle East and Israel
- Location: New York City, New York, U.S.
- Key people: Carol Ann Schwartz, President; Ellen Finkelstein, CEO and Executive Director
- Website: hadassah.org

Hadassah, The Women's Zionist Organization of America is an American Jewish volunteer women's organization. Founded in 1912 by Henrietta Szold, it is one of the largest international Jewish organizations, with nearly 300,000 members in the United States. Hadassah fundraises for community programs and health initiatives in Israel, including the Hadassah Medical Organization, two leading research hospitals in Jerusalem. In the US, the organization advocates on behalf of women's rights, religious autonomy and US–Israel diplomacy. In Israel, Hadassah supports health education and research, women's initiatives, schools and programs for underprivileged youth. It is also a partner of the Israel Coalition for Trauma.

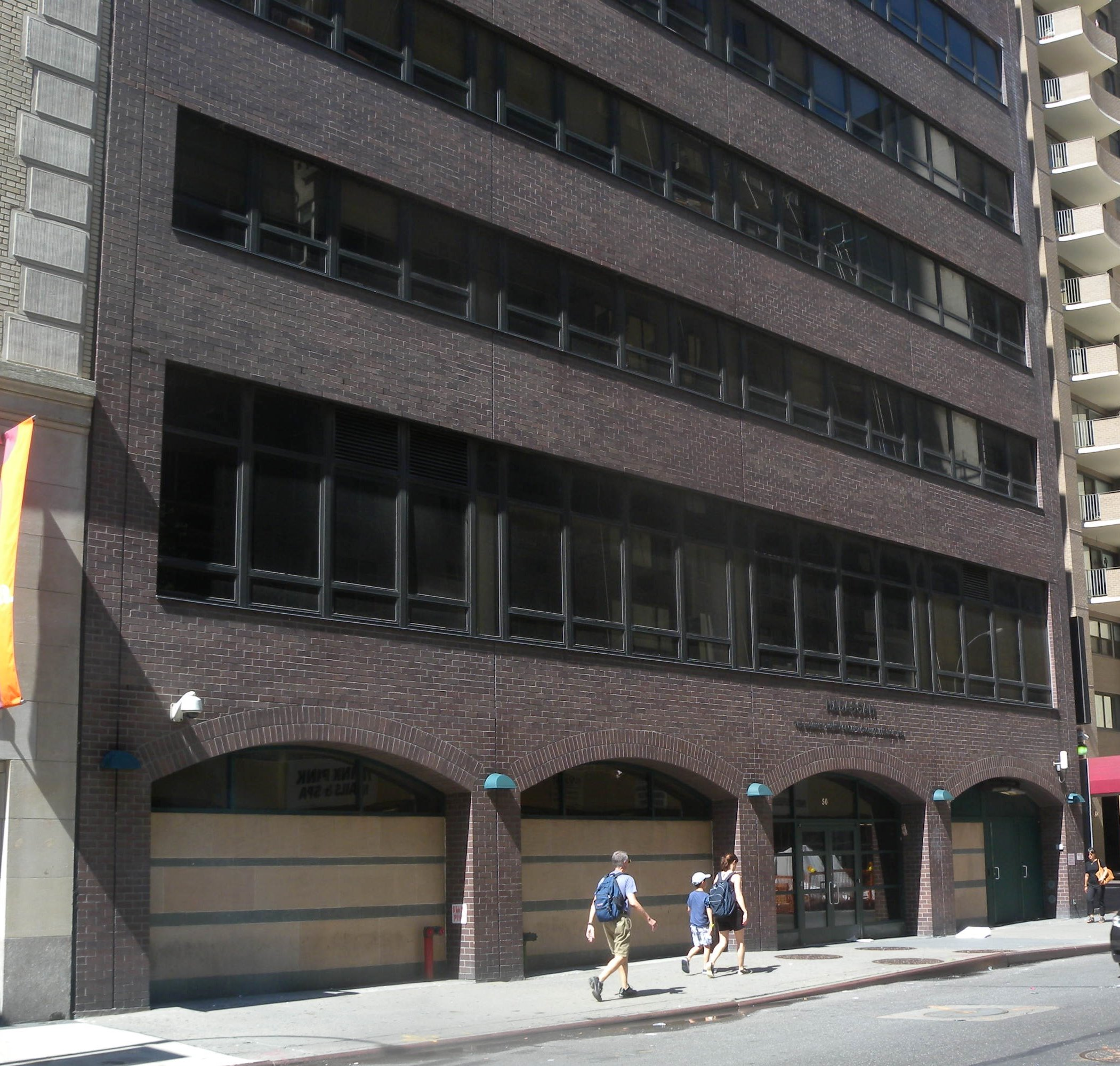
Former Headquarters of Hadassah in Manhattan

== History ==
=== Origins ===
At a meeting at Temple Emanu-El in New York City on February 24, 1912, Henrietta Szold, together with other Zionist women, proposed to the Daughters of Zion study circle that they expand their purpose and embrace proactive work to help meet the health needs of Palestine's people. The goal was to promote the Zionist ideal through education, public health initiatives, and the training of nurses in what was then the Palestine region of the Ottoman Empire. Because the meeting was held around the time of Purim, the women called themselves "The Hadassah chapter of the Daughters of Zion," adopting the Hebrew name of Queen Esther. Szold became the first president. Within a year, Hadassah had five growing chapters in New York, Baltimore, Cleveland, Chicago and Boston. Its charter articulates twin goals: to begin public-health initiatives and nurse training in Palestine, and to foster Zionist ideals through education in America.

=== The first years: Establishing healthcare in Palestine ===
1919–1915: Hadassah sent two nurses to Palestine, Rose Kaplan and Rae Landy. They set up a small public health station in Jerusalem to provide maternity care and treat trachoma, a dreaded eye disease rampant in the Middle East. The core of future Hadassah education programs emerged when Jessie Sampter founded The Hadassah School of Zionism in New York in 1915. The school required chapter leaders to take courses, instituted a correspondence course and inspired other Hadassah chapters to create their own Schools of Zionism. Sampter published "A Course in Zionism," a collection of facts, essays, and reading lists financed by prominent American Zionist, Judge Louis Brandeis.

1916: Hadassah established the Palestine Purchasing and Supplies Department (later the Hadassah Supplies Bureau) to buy and ship items unavailable in the yishuv, the pre-state Jewish community in Palestine. Although Hadassah's first two nurses were compelled to return to America in 1915, the physicians with whom they had co-operated– Dr. Avraham Ticho and Dr. Helena Kagan – as well as the midwives and probationers were able to carry on their work.

1918: Hadassah established the American Zionist Medical Unit (AZMU) in 1918, which was composed of 45 doctors, nurses, dentists and sanitary engineers. The sole female physician in the group was Sophie Rabinoff. The unit was set up to combat the intolerable health conditions of postwar Palestine and to create permanent health and welfare programs. From the beginning, it established a principle of serving all with equal care, regardless of race, creed, ethnicity, or nationality. The AZMU helped to establish six hospitals in Palestine which were then turned over to municipal authorities. Led by Alice Seligsberg, the unit sailed for Palestine in June, bringing desperately needed drugs, medical instruments and supplies, linen and clothing. That year, Hadassah also founded a nursing school to train local personnel and create a cadre of nurses. Over the next few years, the unit, based in the old Rothschild Hospital in Jerusalem, initiated American-style health and welfare programs with intensive campaigns to wipe out malaria, cholera, trachoma and scalp diseases in many Jewish communities in the yishuv. The unit organized a sanitation program and founded Hadassah hospitals in Jaffa, Tiberias, and Safed, and opened the Nurses' Training School at the Rothschild Hospital in Jerusalem. The first 22 young women graduated from Hadassah's Nurses' Training School in 1921. In 1924, the unit's name is changed to Hadassah Medical Organization.

1919–1920: Hadassah organized the first School Hygiene Department in Palestine to give routine health examinations to Jerusalem schoolchildren. During the Arab riots of 1920, Hadassah nurses cared for the wounded on both sides. Henrietta Szold also moved to Jerusalem that year to develop community health and preventive care programs. Back in New York in 1920, Alice Seligsberg formed Junior Hadassah, which provided programs for young women who wanted to participate in Hadassah's Zionist mission. In the same year, Henrietta Szold moved to Palestine to lead the medical work started by the unit. She remained based in Jerusalem until her death in 1945.

1921: Hadassah nurse Bertha Landsman created Palestine's first permanent infant welfare station, Tipat Halav (Drop of Milk), in Jerusalem. The overwhelming success inspired Hadassah to expand the program, delivering fresh milk to needy families by "donkey express." Hadassah also opened a hospital in Tel Aviv, the city's first hospital. Under Hadassah's philosophy of "devolution," it initiated and developed a number of facilities and projects and then transferred them to the appropriate municipalities. Hadassah transferred administration of this hospital to the Tel Aviv municipality in 1931.

1923: Hadassah instituted a school lunch program to teach nutrition and serve healthy meals to children and teenagers in Palestine. Pennies were collected by American Hebrew school students to fund this project, which was devolved to the Israeli government in 1950, with Hadassah's support ending in 1954.

1924: Nathan Straus contributed $10,000, with which Hadassah developed its Infant Welfare Stations into a complete network, extending from Jerusalem to Tiberias. Pamphlets were distributed to all Hadassah chapters for five cents each.

1925: Junior Hadassah assumed sole support of the Meir Shfeya Children's Village, a youth village housing World War I orphans and socially disadvantaged children (devolved to the Israeli government's Ministry of Agriculture in 1953, with Hadassah continuing limited financial support).

1926: Hadassah formed a partnership with the Jewish National Fund (JNF), also known as Keren Keyemeth LeYisrael (KKL), an organization established in 1901 by the Fifth World Zionist Congress to purchase and transform land in Palestine for Jewish farming, housing, roads, and recreation. JNF became, and has remained, a major Hadassah project in Israel. Hadassah opened Palestine's first tuberculosis ward in its Safed hospital, which became the region's tuberculosis center in 1935 (devolved to the Israeli government in 1957).

1927: The cornerstone was laid at a solemn ceremony for the Nathan and Lina Straus Health Center in Jerusalem, conceived as a model for future health centers in Palestine, with funding from Nathan Straus. According to Dr. E. M. Bluestone, then Director of the Hadassah Medical Organization, this center would serve as the headquarters of the Health Welfare Department of the Hadassah Medical Organization, with space devoted to new health activities. Over the decades, the building housed many preventive health programs, including a dental clinic, children's exercise programs, and Nathan Straus' milk pasteurization plant, among others.

1928: Hadassah's urban recreational activities program began with the supervision of the Guggenheimer Playgrounds, with funds from the estate of Bertha V. Guggenheimer. By 1950, when the playgrounds were devolved to the Israeli government's Ministry of Education, the program had grown to fifty playgrounds throughout the country where urban children had a safe, sanitary place to play.

1929: Hadassah Medical Organization (HMO) opened the Nathan and Lina Straus Health Center to serve Jerusalem's growing population, made possible by a large gift from the Straus family. The center operates today as an outpatient facility in downtown Jerusalem.

=== Youth Aliyah ===
1933: Recha Freier began Youth Aliyah (Jugendaliyah, Aliyat Hano'ar) in Berlin, working with German youth leaders to resettle Jewish children in Palestine. Henrietta Szold was appointed the first Director of Youth Aliyah by the governing council of the Yishuv, the Va'ad Le'umi.

1934: Youth Aliyah's first 43 wards arrived in Haifa. In what became a lifelong practice, Henrietta Szold greeted them at the dock and accompanied them to Kibbutz Ein Harod. The cornerstone was laid on Mount Scopus for the Rothschild-Hadassah University Hospital (RHUH) and new quarters for Hadassah's Nurses' Training School.

1935: Spearheaded by National President Rose Jacobs, Convention delegates accepted Youth Aliyah as an official Hadassah project and established Hadassah as its sole American sponsor. Palestine's first social-service programs began when Hadassah opened the Nettie Lasker Social Service Department in Jerusalem.

1936: In honor of Henrietta Szold's 75th birthday, the name of the nursing school officially changed during graduation ceremonies to the Henrietta Szold Hadassah-Hebrew University School of Nursing. On October 21, the Groundbreaking ceremony for the Hadassah-Hebrew University Hospital and Medical School was held on Mt. Scopus, and attended by Henrietta Szold, David Ben-Gurion, hospital architect Erich Mendelsohn and others. Young Judaea, the oldest Zionist youth movement in the U.S. (founded 1909), joined the Hadassah family when Hadassah agreed to provide partial funding for the movement. The British Royal Commission, known as the Peel Commission, praised Hadassah's work in its 1937 report:

The Hadassah Medical Organization has developed a widespread system of clinics in Jewish centres and hospitals in the principal towns...Though naturally the Jewish population benefited most, the Hadassah medical services were available to all the communities in Palestine, and many of the poorer classes amongst the Arabs received much assistance from the organization's work. This disinterested philanthropy of Hadassah deserves recognition: it was a real step towards promoting good feeling between the two races; but, unhappily, the effect of its work was impaired by other influences.

1939: The Rothschild-Hadassah University Hospital on Mount Scopus, the first teaching hospital and medical center in Palestine, opened on May 9. New Scopus quarters for the celebrated Henrietta Szold-Hadassah School of Nursing were also dedicated. When World War II began in Europe on September 1, Hadassah began war emergency shipments of medical supplies, equipment, food, drugs and clothing to Palestine.

=== Advocacy in the U.S. ===
1940: Hadassah and the Zionist Organization of America (ZOA) formed the American Zionist Youth Commission, establishing Hadassah as Young Judaea's co-sponsor. Hadassah formed an American Affairs Committee, the core of today's American Affairs programs, reflecting Hadassah's concern with the ideals of democracy, freedom and justice in the U.S. and in the yishuv. War relief and defense of democracy were two immediate committee projects. Former Hadassah national president Rose Jacobs started the Committee for the Study of Arab-Jewish Relations to promote "Zionism's unfinished agenda", coexistence between Palestine's two major populations.

=== 1941–1970: Building healthcare in Israel ===
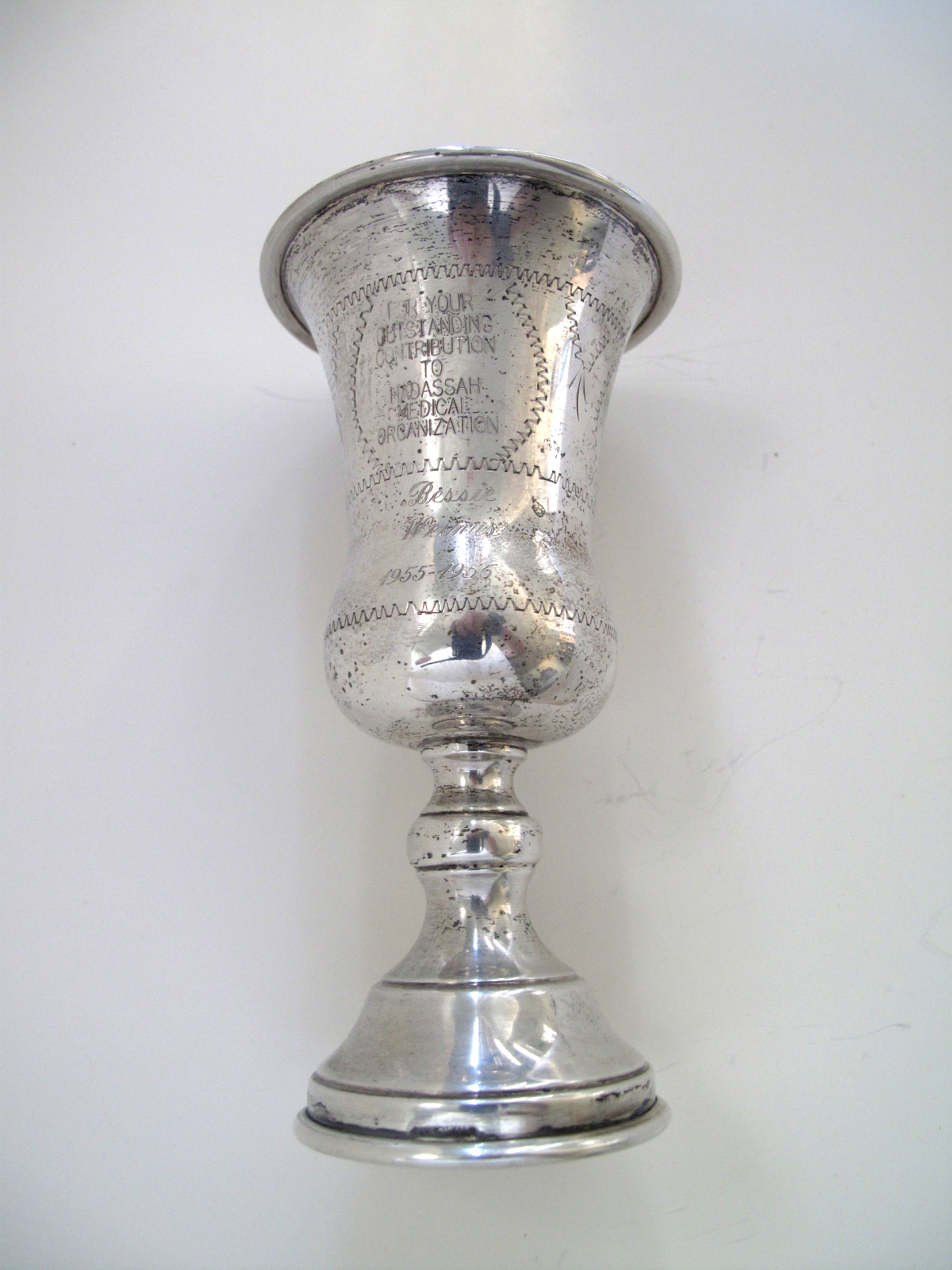
Kiddush cup given to Hadassah volunteer, Bronx, New York, 1955–1956

1941: Hadassah sent an American neurosurgeon, Dr. Henry Wigderson, to Palestine to create the Hadassah Medical Organization's first Department of Neurosurgery. At age 81, Henrietta Szold established the Child and Youth Welfare Organization to coordinate public and voluntary child and youth welfare services. Hadassah, the Va'ad Leumi and the Jewish Agency funded the project. In 1945, after her death, the organization was renamed the Henrietta Szold Foundation for Child and Youth Welfare. In 1948, it became autonomous, with Hadassah participating on the board of directors. In 1960, on the centennial of Szold's birth, the Israeli government, together with Hadassah and the Jewish Agency, undertook to contribute to the budget of the foundation, now renamed Machon (or Mosad) Szold, the Szold Institute.

==== Hadassah women in WWII ====
1942: After the U.S. entered World War II, Hadassah immediately mobilized to support the American war effort. Members established blood banks, sold war bonds, and volunteered in their local communities, while National Hadassah continued to ship food, drugs and medical supplies to Palestine. At Henrietta Szold's request, Hadassah began its vocational education initiatives, later called the Hadassah Vocational Education Services (HVES), by establishing the Alice L. Seligsberg Trade School for Girls, the first school of its kind in Palestine; 35 girls enrolled.

1943: Due in part to Hadassah's relentless efforts, the Tehran Children, a group of more than 800 young Polish Jewish refugees, arrived in Haifa after four years of wandering from Poland through the Soviet Union to a squalid refugee camp outside Tehran, Iran. Youth Aliyah accepted these young Holocaust survivors and helped them adjust to their new lives.

1944: Hadassah opened the Apprenticeship Department at the Brandeis Vocational Center, named in honor of U.S. Supreme Court Justice Louis Brandeis. Two years later, the Fine Mechanics Workshop was joined by the Apprenticeship School of Printing. The Hadassah Vocational Guidance Bureau (later the Hadassah Vocational Guidance Institute and, in 1989, the Hadassah Career Counseling Institute [HCCI]) was opened in Jerusalem. Youth Aliyah observed its tenth year of youth rescue.

1945: Henrietta Szold, age 84, died of pneumonia on February 13 (30 Shevat 5705) at the Rothschild-Hadassah University Hospital. Her funeral was attended by some of the thousands of Youth Aliyah children and nursing students whose lives she touched. She was mourned throughout the world. Hadassah and the American Friends of the Hebrew University initiated a $4 million fundraising campaign to build the Hebrew University-Hadassah School of Medicine.

Hadassah was awarded a citation recognizing the sale of $200 million worth of U.S. government defense bonds during World War II.

==== Impact of UN Partition Plan ====
1947: In the wake of the UN partition plan of November 29, which called for the establishment of independent Jewish and Arab enclaves in Palestine within a year, travel to and from Mount Scopus became increasingly dangerous. Hadassah and Hebrew University personnel were compelled to commute by armed convoy. Part of the process in making their decision involved a visit by members of the United Nations Special Committee on Palestine (UNSCOP) to various facilities throughout Palestine, including the sophisticated Rothschild-Hadassah University Hospital on Mount Scopus.

===== Hadassah Medical Convoy Massacre =====
1948: While attempting to reach Mount Scopus on April 13, a convoy of Hadassah and Hebrew University doctors, nurses and other personnel were ambushed. Besieged and under fire for hours, 78 people were killed, among them HMO Director Dr. Haim Yassky. Unable to guarantee the safety of its patients or staff, Hadassah evacuated all its facilities on Mount Scopus, relocating all departments to five makeshift hospitals in temporary quarters around Jerusalem. Hadassah lost access to Mount Scopus for the next 19 years.

=== Israel's birth ===
1948: The State of Israel was born. HMO tended to the thousands of wounded soldiers pouring into Jerusalem, plus the usual high numbers of civilians seeking aid.

1949: As "Operation Magic Carpet" rescued and brought 45,000 Yemenite Jews to Israel, HMO created an emergency hospital in Rosh Ha'ayin for the care of new immigrants, as requested by the new Israeli government. With its resources stretched to the limit, the Hadassah Medical Organization in Jerusalem asks the Hadassah National Board to provide six American nurses to work for a year at the Rosh Ha'ayin immigrant camp. Youth Aliyah opened Ramat Hadassah Szold Youth Village near Haifa as a reception center for refugee children from Arab countries, Turkey, Hungary, and elsewhere. Today it serves Israeli-born and immigrant children, ages 11 to 15, who require intensive remedial education programs. Hadassah established the Henrietta Szold Award as its highest honor, to be presented annually. Eleanor Roosevelt was named the first honoree for her efforts on Hadassah's behalf, most notably as World Patron of Youth Aliyah. HMO opens the Lasker Mental Hygiene and Child Guidance Clinic in Jerusalem (today part of HMO's Department of Psychiatry). Hadassah opened the Hadassah-Yassky Memorial Hospital in Beersheva (later transferred to Kupat Holim in 1960).

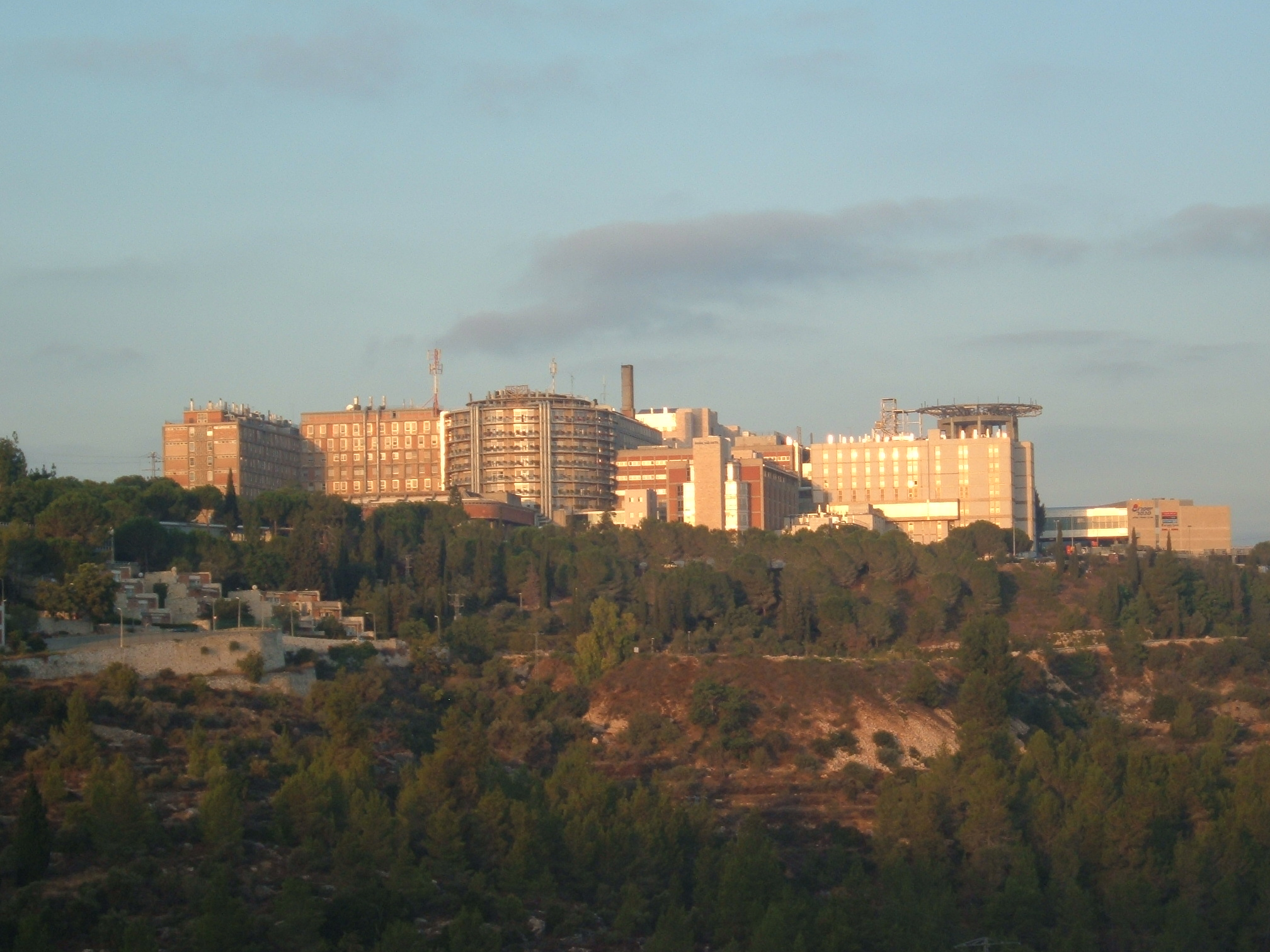
Hadassah Ein Karem

1950: Two years after the evacuation of Mount Scopus, the Hadassah National Board voted to build a new medical center on the hillside above Ein Kerem, a small village west of Jerusalem. A fundraising campaign for this medical complex began in 1953. As part of its continuing policy of devolution, Hadassah transferred its Nutrition Department, including the school lunch program, to the Israeli government.

==== New medical center ====
1952: Hadassah transferred its network of 134 health welfare stations throughout Israel to the Israeli government, retaining its 32 stations in Jerusalem and the surrounding area, which it devolved to the government in 1963. The Hebrew University-Hadassah School of Medicine graduated its first class of physicians. The groundbreaking was held for the new medical center at Ein Kerem. Hadassah's educational youth programs in Israel, previously grouped under Hadassah Youth Services, were renamed Hadassah Vocational Education Services.

==== Operation Reindeer ====
1953: Hadassah participated in "Operation Reindeer", a U.S. government program to alleviate food shortages within Israel, particularly within immigrant populations. The Hebrew University-Hadassah School of Dental Medicine opened, founded in cooperation with the Alpha Omega Jewish Dental Fraternity. Students trained at HMO's Jerusalem dental clinic.

1954: HMO pilots Ya'al, the "Helping Hand of Hadassah", a volunteer auxiliary of women who served in Hadassah's medical facilities that later became a model for volunteerism in Israel. HMO opened Israel's first cardiac surgical unit and its first Department of Psychiatry at the Hebrew University-Hadassah School of Medicine.

1955: Youth Aliyah began its day center program with services for youth from Israel's rural and development areas. The program rapidly expanded to encompass urban youth as well. The national headquarters of HWZOA moved into its first "house," a Hadassah-owned and occupied building on East 52nd Street in New York City.

1956: HMO piloted a community health station in the Arab village of Abu Ghosh. Young Judaea opened its first Year Course in Israel for high school graduates.

1958: Construction of the new medical center at Ein Kerem accelerated, and Hadassah began its first pilgrimage to Israel.

1959: HMO introduced open-heart surgery to Israel, installed the cobalt bomb for cancer therapy, and graduated the first ten Israel-trained dentists from the Hebrew University-Hadassah School of Dental Medicine. The Hebrew University-Hadassah School of Medicine began training African and Asian doctors in cooperation with the World Health Organization and Israel's Foreign Ministry. The initiative later expanded to include South American doctors.

1961: Hadassah-Ein Kerem opened on June 6. Supervised by HMO senior staff, the Israeli Army transported every patient in each of Hadassah's five temporary hospitals to a preassigned bed at the new medical center.

1962: Hadassah turned 50 and celebrated its golden jubilee year. The Fannie and Maxwell Abbell Chapel (synagogue) at Hadassah-Ein Kerem was dedicated. Marc Chagall's 12 stained-glass windows, each representing one of Israel's 12 tribes, were installed in the synagogue. Former National President Dr. Miriam Freund-Rosenthal enlisted the artist and saw the project to completion.

1964: The Hebrew University-Hadassah School of Dental Medicine moved into its new quarters at Hadassah-Ein Kerem. Chaim Gross's bronze "Mother and Child" sculpture was installed near the entrance to Hadassah-Ein Kerem.

1965: The U.S. Agency for International Development (USAID) announced its first grant to Hadassah: $335,000 for Hadassah-Ein Kerem and the Alice L. Seligsberg High School. Today, Hadassah continues to receive generous USAID grants earmarked for HMO. The Hebrew University-Hadassah School of Medicine moved to new building facilities at Hadassah-Ein Kerem.

==== Israel's first open-heart surgery ====
1967: An HMO surgical team completes Israel's first successful two-valve open-heart operation. Hadassah Associates was founded as the fundraising arm for American men who wanted to support Hadassah's work. Rebecca Shulman, the only National Board member in Israel during the Six-Day War, was given a seat in the first Hadassah Medical Organization car to travel to the hospital on Mount Scopus immediately after the war ended. For the first time since 1948, the Hadassah flag was raised at the damaged hospital buildings. At the end of the Six-Day War, National President Charlotte Jacobson and HMO Director-General Dr. Kalman Mann traveled to Mount Scopus to receive the keys to Hadassah's hospital. At the Israeli government's request, Hadassah agreed to rebuild its first "hill of healing" as a general hospital for the surrounding community. Hadassah accepted sole sponsorship of an expanded, co-educational Zionist Youth Movement. Young Judaea and Junior Hadassah were merged as Hashachar (the Dawn) for ages 9–18. Young adults, ages 18–25, became members of Hamagshimim (the Fulfillers). The movement as a whole is referred to as "Young Judaea."

==== Israel's first kidney transplant ====
1967: HMO performs Israel's first successful kidney transplant.

1968: The official restoration of Hadassah-Mount Scopus began with Hadassah planning a 260-bed hospital and rehabilitation center. Hadassah launched a fundraising campaign to restore Hadassah-Mount Scopus. HMO pioneered 24-hour emergency units at Hadassah-Ein Kerem for acute respiratory and coronary care, burns and trauma. At the first National Board mid-winter meetings held in Israel, ground was broken at Hadassah-Ein Kerem for the Siegfried & Irma Ullman Building for Cancer and Allied Diseases, which would later house the Moshe Sharett Institute of Oncology (opening in 1976).

1970: Hadassah established a youth center on Mount Scopus for Young Judaeans participating in Israel programs in the building intended for the Nurses' Training School before 1948. The building was renamed the Judith Riklis Building (Beit Riklis). Hadassah established the Hebrew University-Hadassah School of Occupational Therapy, housed in the Edith and James Ross building on Hadassah-Mount Scopus. The Hadassah Community College (later Hadassah College Jerusalem [HCJ]), Israel's first American-style community college, opened in the Brandeis Vocational Center complex with 124 day and 84 evening students. The Alice Seligsberg Comprehensive High School merged with Brandeis (see 1944) to become the co-ed Hadassah Seligsberg-Brandeis Comprehensive High School (devolved to the Jerusalem municipality in 1988).

=== Postwar ===
1972: The Hadassah Community College graduated its first class with Golda Meir as guest of honor. Hadassah incorporated the high school, college, and guidance center under one project, named Hadassah Israel Education Services (HIES).

1973: Graduates of the Young Judaea Year Course in Israel led a group of olim ("new immigrants") and native-born Israelis and established Kibbutz Ketura in the Arava region of the Negev. HMO medical teams rapidly mobilized, treating more than 4,000 casualties during the Yom Kippur War. During and after the war, HMO concentrated on the rehabilitation of the severely burned and wounded, relying heavily on pace-setting rehabilitation services offered through its newly opened Trauma Unit.

1974: After Congress passed legislation, which helped tens of thousands of Soviet Jews immigrate to Israel during the 1970s and '80s, the National Board allocated $1 million to retrain Russian doctors, nurses and other health professionals at HMO. In honor of Youth Aliyah's 40th anniversary, Hadassah allocated more than $1 million to provide new residential and innovative day centers for Youth Aliyah.

==== UN General Assembly Resolution 3379: "Zionism Equals Racism" ====
1975: On October 21, Hadassah rededicated the rebuilt and refurbished Hadassah University Hospital at Mount Scopus. The Arab bloc succeeded in passing United Nations General Assembly Resolution 3379 "Elimination of All Forms of Racial Discrimination", better known as the "Zionism Equals Racism" resolution. Hadassah worked passionately for its repeal, and it was ultimately rescinded in 1991. Hadassah introduced the Bachelor of Nursing Sciences program at the Henrietta Szold Hadassah-Hebrew University School of Nursing, Israel's first four-year nursing degree program. Hadassah pledged to help Youth Aliyah absorb 3,000 disadvantaged Israeli youth and allocated $200,000 to build new dormitory space, its first program to focus exclusively on native-born Israelis. This program continues today as Youth Aliyah's Children at Risk.

1976: Hadassah welcomed its 100,000th Life Member. The newly reopened Hadassah-Mount Scopus hospital received its first 100 patients in April, almost 28 years after the convoy massacre of 1948. Hadassah and JNF celebrated 50 years of partnership by completing Hadassah's 16th JNF project, "Greening of the Desert," in three development towns, and by dedicating Hadassah Plaza in the JNF Bicentennial Park near Jerusalem. The Daniel and Florence Guggenheim Rehabilitation Pavilion, the first of its kind in Israel, opens at Hadassah-Mount Scopus. The Moshe Sharett Institute of Oncology and Allied Diseases opens in the Siegfried and Irma Ullmann Building at Hadassah-Ein Kerem. Hadassah moves its national headquarters from West 52nd Street to 50 West 58th Street, New York, its current location.

==== Israel's first EMI scanner ====
1977: Hadassah installed Israel's first EMI scanner at HMO's Radiology Department and opened the Rosalie Goldberg Neonatal Intensive Care Unit, Israel's first NICU, at Hadassah-Mt. Scopus. The NICU soon received its first one-pound baby. The Aleen and Lawrence Schacht-Hadassah Day Care Nursery opens at Hadassah-Ein Kerem to care for 100 preschool-age children of hospital personnel.

1978: Hadassah Community College opened Israel's first two-year dental technicians' course, in cooperation with the faculty of the Hebrew University-Hadassah School of Dental Medicine. HMO performed Israel's first successful bone marrow transplant. Following the previous year's visit of Egyptian President Anwar el-Sadat to Jerusalem, Hadassah convened its 64th National Convention—its first in Israel—bringing 2,500 participants to Jerusalem. Hadassah established a tradition of holding periodic National Conventions in Israel. Jacques Lipchitz's sculpture, "Tree of Life", was unveiled at Hadassah Mount Scopus.

1979: Hadassah's Aliyah Department organized Israel Family Live-In programs for work-study-travel participants. National and local Hadassah leaders marched for Soviet Jewry in the Solidarity Sunday parade in New York.

1982: HMO received casualties by helicopter and ambulance convoy throughout the first war with Lebanon. Despite the war, Hadassah held its 68th National Convention in Israel, the organization's second convention in Israel. Hadassah-Ein Kerem became one of five world centers capable of performing test-tube conception. A year later, Jerusalem's first test-tube baby (a girl) was born to a high-risk mother.

1986: The Ina and Jack Kay Hospice, Jerusalem's only Jewish hospice, opened at Hadassah-Mount Scopus, in response to a critical need among Jewish patients. HMO opened a regional AIDS testing center at Hadassah-Ein Kerem.

==== Building hospitals in Africa ====
1988: At the invitation of USAID, HMO medical staff members help plan, construct and open a hospital in Kinshasa, Zaire. Hadassah advocated for increased health services for those infected with HIV/AIDS and adequate funding for AIDS research in the U.S. The Hadassah Seligsberg-Brandeis Comprehensive High School was devolved to the Jerusalem municipality and relocated to East Talpiot. Expansion of Hadassah Community College began.

==== Marching for abortion legality in the U.S. ====
1989: At a historic pro-choice rally of 300,000 in Washington, D.C., Hadassah marched with women and men from across the U.S. With the end of the Cold War and the gradual collapse of the Soviet bloc, hundreds of thousands of Soviet Jews began to leave for Israel; Hadassah prepared to meet their needs and absorbed many of them as employees. HIES was restructured, and Hadassah Community College was renamed the Hadassah College of Technology (HCT), today Israel's foremost technology institute (now called Hadassah College-Jerusalem). The Hadassah Vocational Guidance Bureau was renamed the Hadassah Career Counseling Institute (HCCI). The city of Jerusalem honored Hadassah by dedicating Hadassah Square, a small city square on Rehov Ha-Melekh George (King George Street), near Agron Street. HMO's Complementary (alternative) Medicine Department opened in downtown Jerusalem. It later moved to Hadassah-Ein Kerem in 2001.

==== Operation Exodus ====
1990: As "Operation Exodus" continued to bring waves of Jews to Israel from the dissolving Soviet Union, Hadassah absorbed and retrained groups of health-care professionals. HCT became the first institution in Israel to retrain immigrants by offering both Russian and Hebrew courses in dental and laboratory technology, and by translating its materials into Russian. HCCI trained Russian career counselors and offered Russian-language occupational materials to immigrants. Youth Aliyah started its first ulpan (Hebrew language program) for Soviet students. Young Judaea invited Soviet teen immigrants living in the U.S. to attend its leadership camp, Tel Yehudah. Hadassah met an additional JNF pledge to replace 100,000 trees destroyed by arson, and pledged to provide JNF recreational facilities in a Galilee development plan. Over a two-week period in a remote area of Kenya, HMO eye surgeons operated on 400 blind people, giving many sight for the first time.

1992: During the Persian Gulf War ("Operation Desert Storm", 1991), Iraqi Scud missiles struck Israel. HMO treated casualties and helped distribute health information and gas masks to the population. Despite the risks, 45 National Board members, led by National President Carmela E. Kalmanson, traveled to Israel on their scheduled mission, demonstrating Hadassah's solidarity with Israel's people. "Operation Solomon" brought thousands of Ethiopian Jews to Israel, with 14,500 arriving within a single day. Hadassah contributed $3 million to Youth Aliyah over the next three years, enabling it to adapt its programs to meet the needs of this newest group of olim. HMO formally opened two major interdisciplinary units for liver disease and diabetes, both with inpatient wards, outpatient clinics, laboratories, and facilities for day care, patient education, teaching and research. Kiryat HaYovel opened a special clinic to extend care to 700 Ethiopian immigrants. Hadassah initiated Hadassah Cares, an ongoing breast health awareness and education program for American women of all ages. This program included Hadassah's award-winning Check It Out program for high school girls, and today offers testicular cancer education for teenage boys.

==== Israel's first heart-lung transplant ====
1993: HMO performed Israel's first successful heart-lung transplant.

1994: Hadassah, WZOA, received the approval of the Zionist General Council for special status as a member of the World Zionist Organization, ensuring that Hadassah would be granted participation in all activities of the World Zionist Organization, as well as in every Congress, with a fixed delegation of 32 members.

==== Advocating for the Violence Against Women Act ====
1995: U.S. Congress passed the Violence Against Women Act, creating programs and greater legal recourse for survivors of domestic abuse. Hadassah, an early advocate on behalf of victims of domestic violence, intensified its programs on domestic abuse, both in the U.S. and in Israel. The National Committee of Hadassah Associates was formed to encourage men to take a more active role in membership enrollment and fundraising for the Hadassah Medical Organization. Reflecting hopes for peace in the Middle East, Hadassah honored Prime Minister Yitzhak Rabin and Foreign Minister Shimon Peres with the Henrietta Szold Award, presented at the national annual convention held in Jerusalem. Hadassah dedicated its $23 million Mother and Child Center at Hadassah-Ein Kerem during the annual National Convention; it comprised the Julia Goldwurm Maternity Pavilion and the Wolfson Children's Pavilion. The Center was named the Charlotte R. Bloomberg Mother and Child Center in 2003 in honor of New York City Mayor Michael Bloomberg's mother.

1996: Elsie Roth galvanizes her Hadassah Nurses' Council colleagues to spearhead a relief drive for war-torn Bosnia. Hadassah members collected over 100 tons of supplies. Roth and fellow volunteer Sherry Hahn personally delivered them to people in Bosnia. Hadassah's National Commission on American Jewish Women published Voices for Change: Future Directions for American Jewish Women, a landmark study that directly questioned Jewish women about their needs, hopes, and desires. Hadassah initiated grassroots community service with READ*WRITE*NOW!, a U.S. volunteer literacy program. Hadassah transformed its historic 19th-century Villa Rosemarie in Jerusalem's German Colony into Merkaz Hamagshimim, an absorption/community center and residence for young adult olim from English-speaking countries

1997: In honor of Hadassah's 85th Anniversary, Hadassah's first Women of Distinction Awards were presented in Israel (January) and in the U.S. at Purim (March) at Temple Emanu-El in Staten Island, where Hadassah's first meeting was held in 1912. Hadassah joined a broad-based national coalition lobbying for federal legislation to prevent genetic discrimination by health insurance carriers and employers. The Henrietta Szold Hadassah-Hebrew University School of Nursing formed a historic partnership with the University of Maryland School of Nursing to create a clinical master's program at Hadassah. Future projects included graduate programs in trauma/critical care, geriatric nursing and oncology nursing. Young Judaea formed ATID (future, in Hebrew), an educational and action partnership with Israel's Tsofim (Scouts) and Britain's Federation of Zionist Youth (FZY), its sister movement. Impelled by Voices for Change, Hadassah founded the International Research Institute on Jewish Women at Brandeis University, now known as the Hadassah-Brandeis Institute (HBI).

1998: In honor of Israel's 50th Anniversary, Hadassah allocated $3 million to make JNF's American Independence Park Israel's first completely handicapped-accessible park. Eight more such Hadassah-funded parks were scheduled for necessary renovation. Hadassah's Jewish Education Department published "Zionism: The Sequel", examining the state of the Zionist movement and Israel. Hadassah sponsored a special Miracle Mission to Israel, led by former National President Ruth Popkin. Youth Aliyah's Meir Shfeya Children's Village received the Israel Prize in Education. Hadassah initiated the Hadassah Leadership Academy (HLA), which then piloted its first multi-year program in Jewish women's history, Zionism and Israel, community leadership, and social advocacy. Hadassah's National Board formally established the Hadassah Foundation with a $10 million endowment to address societal needs in Israel and the U.S., outside the traditional Hadassah project framework. Hadassah established the Goldyne Savad Institute of Gene Therapy at Hadassah-Ein Kerem. The Young Judaea Alumni Study, undertaken to gauge the youth movement's long-term impact on participants, revealed that active membership in Young Judaea exerted a powerful positive influence upon adult Jewish identity and increased Jewish involvement. HMO health professionals Professor Dan Engelhardt and Professor Yoel Donchin, activated IDF reservists, brought medical equipment and eight tons of medical supplies to Macedonian field hospitals to assist refugees from a devastated Kosovo.

1999: At a National Convention in Washington, D.C., 2,000 Hadassah delegates from across the United States visited Capitol Hill, bringing Hadassah voices to their senators and representatives at Hadassah's largest "Day on the Hill" ever.

==== "To Save a Life" program ====
2000: The Hadassah College of Technology turned 30 and graduated its first academic class. Hadassah introduced Pikuah Nefesh ("To Save a Life"), a program created to increase awareness of the need for organ and tissue donations. In support of stricter gun control legislation, Hadassah members and friends joined the Mother's Day Million Mom March in Washington, D.C., and around the United States. The Al-Aksa Intifada erupts on the Temple Mount on September 28. After violence in Israel, HMO mobilized to treat the wounded, while HWZOA provided new programs, speakers, materials and action alerts for its members in the United States. Hadassah partnered with Birthright Israel, with some programs provided through Young Judaea. Hadassah hospitals at Mount Scopus and Ein Kerem were designated smoke-free zones in accordance with Hadassah's mission to protect and promote health.

=== Since 2001 ===
==== ECOSOC recognition ====
2001: Hadassah was approved by the U.N. Economic and Social Council (ECOSOC) as a non-governmental organization (NGO), enabling Hadassah to lend its medical and social expertise to the international body. As JNF celebrated its centennial, Hadassah, its partner for 75 years, designated $3 million to help improve Israel's water situation with a new reservoir in the Jordan Valley. The Esther Gottesman Center for Technology, housed within HCT's restored "Arches" building, was dedicated. It included the new Henrietta Szold Center for students with special needs and challenges.

2002: In response to the growing need for trauma medicine, Hadassah launched a major fundraising program to expand the Center for Emergency Medicine at Hadassah-Ein Kerem.

2004: With many months of recovery and reconstruction work needed to repair the devastation left by Hurricane Charley on the southwest coast of Florida, Hadassah launched a special appeal to raise assistance funds. At HMO, a research team led by Professors Benjamin Reubinoff and Tamir Ben-Hur found that human embryonic stem cells can improve the functioning of a laboratory rat with Parkinson's disease. The research was funded in part by the National Institute of Neurological Disorders and Stroke (NINDS), a component of the National Institutes of Health (NIH) in the United States.

2005: Hadassah dedicated a new facility, the Judy and Sidney Swartz Center for Emergency Medicine at Ein Kerem. The $50 million center could treat 100,000 to 120,000 patients annually, an increase of 41 percent over previous use, and included an expanded trauma and resuscitation unit, an acute and critical care facility, adult and pediatric emergency units, and an observation unit.

In 2005, the two Jerusalem hospitals of the Hadassah Medical Organization were nominated for the Nobel Peace Prize, citing areas in which they promoted peace:

- Maintaining equal treatment for all regardless of religion, ethnicity and nationality
- Setting an example of cooperation and coexistence by maintaining a mixed staff of people of all faiths
- Initiatives to create bridges for peace, even during periods of active conflict between Israel and one or more of its neighbors

2006: Hadassah staff from the Hadassah-Hebrew University Medical Center in Jerusalem volunteered to travel 112 miles north to Katyusha-struck Nahariya every weekday during the missile bombardment in the summer. They traveled in teams composed of a physician (usually an internist), a child psychiatrist, a clinical psychologist, a social worker, and a medical clown, clad in helmets and bullet-proof vests, moving through the town from shelter to shelter, reaching out to Nahariya's traumatized residents.

==== Henrietta Szold's induction into National Women's Hall of Fame ====
2007: Henrietta Szold, founder of Hadassah, was inducted into the National Women's Hall of Fame in Seneca Falls, NY, the birthplace of the American women's movement. As Young Judaea's Year Course in Israel celebrated its fiftieth year, a new Year Course track included travel to and study of four extraordinary communities with deep-rooted connections to the Jewish people: Marranos in Portugal, the Lemba of Southern Africa, Bene Israel and Bnei Menashe communities in India, and the Abayudaya Jews of Uganda. Hadassah received a 4-star rating from Charity Navigator, a highly regarded independent charity evaluator. Inspired by its historical imperative to continue building Jerusalem's medical infrastructure, Hadassah raised the first $164 million needed to begin construction of the new Sarah Wetsman Davidson Hospital Tower on the campus of Hadassah Hospital in Ein Kerem.

2008: Nancy Falchuk, National President of Hadassah, was part of the Bush Delegation celebrating the 60th Anniversary of the State of Israel. Research at HMO showed that transplantation of human embryonic stem cells into the brains of mice with multiple sclerosis (MS) significantly slows the clinical symptoms and pathological manifestations of the disease.

2012: Hadassah celebrated its centennial in Jerusalem. Hadassah opened the Sarah Wetsman Davidson Hospital Tower, a 500-bed facility with 20 operating theaters, as well as five below-ground floors for protection from terrorist attacks.

== List of national presidents ==
Years president	Name
1912–1921, 1923–1926	Henrietta Szold
1921–1923	Alice Seligsberg
1926–1928	Irma Lindheim
1928–1930	Zip Szold
1930–1932, 1934–1937	Rose G. Jacobs
1932–1934, 1947–1952	Rose Halprin
1937–1939, 1943–1947	Judith Epstein
1939–1943	Tamar de Sola Pool
1952–1953	Etta Rosensohn
1953–1956	Rebecca Shulman
1956–1960	Miriam Freund-Rosenthal
1960–1964	Lola Kramarsky
1964–1968	Charlotte Jacobson
1968–1972	Faye Schenk
1972–1976	Rose Matzkin
1976–1980	Bernice Tannenbaum
1980–1984	Frieda Lewis
1984–1988	Ruth Popkin
1988–1991	Carmela Kalmanson
1991–1995	Deborah B. Kaplan
1995–1999	Marlene Post
1999–2003	Bonnie Lipton
2003–2007	June Walker
2007–2011	Nancy Falchuk
2011–2015	Marcie Natan
2015–2020	Ellen Hershkin
2020–2024	Rhoda Smolow
2024–present	Carol Ann Schwartz

== Other ventures ==
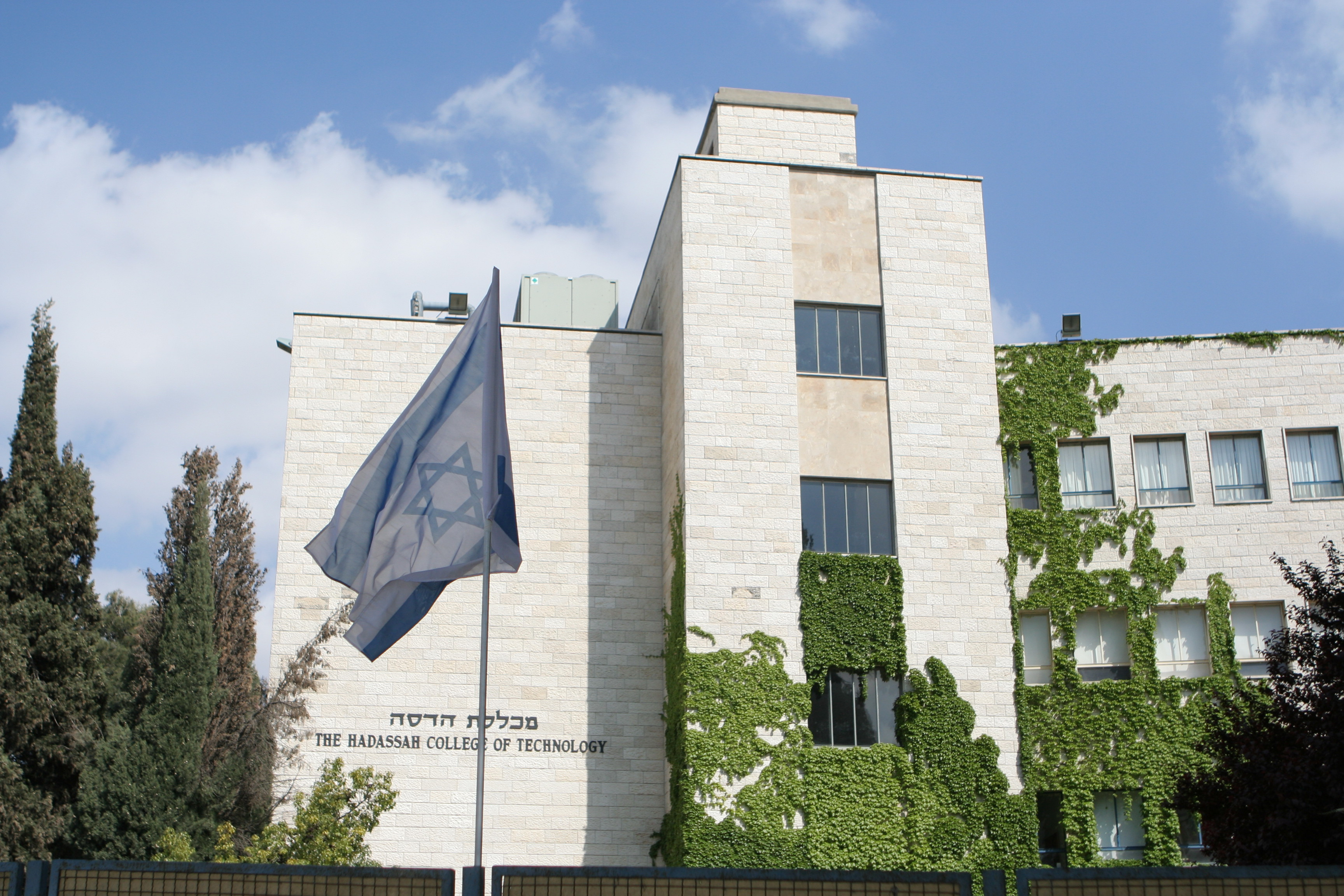
Hadassah College of Technology, Jerusalem

=== Jewish National Fund ===
The Jewish National Fund was founded in 1901 by Theodor Herzl to secure ownership of land in Palestine for the Jewish people from the Ottoman Empire. Most of this land was uncultivated and was reclaimed to create collective workers' communities that could sustain themselves through agricultural means. As the Jewish National Fund's funding grew, so did its involvement in other facets of cultural improvement, such as building major city structures, financing Jewish scientists' expenses, and founding institutions of higher education. Hadassah's partnership with JNF in the 1920s aided in the continuation of like-minded efforts, including meeting an additional JNF pledge to replace 100,000 trees destroyed by arson in 1990, a pledge to provide JNF recreational facilities in a Galilee development plan, and allocating $3 million to make JNF's American Independence Park Israel's first completely handicapped-accessible park, among others. Memorial trees and forests are still purchased in individuals' honors and given as gifts for major events.

=== International programs ===
Established in 1983 by National President Bernice Tannenbaum, Hadassah International is a network of volunteers, including men and women of many faiths and nationalities. Hadassah International does work on every continent save Antarctica. Young Hadassah International is Hadassah International's branch for 18- to 35-year-olds, active in Germany, Australia, Mexico and the United Kingdom, among others.

=== Hadassah Magazine ===
Hadassah Magazine is a bimonthly magazine published out of Hadassah, WZOA's headquarters in Manhattan, covering news, politics and cultural topics, primarily for a Jewish female audience. It has been in circulation since 1914, and in 1986 had 385,000 paid subscribers to its printed edition. The magazine gained additional readers in the early 2000s when it added its free online edition, though the move also brought a decline in the printed edition readership. The paid print circulation is now estimated at over 250,000.

Hadassah Magazine received more than 350 awards for editorial excellence, including a National Magazine Award nomination in 1993, and multiple Simon Rockower Awards.

The magazine was a pioneer in the ban on cigarette advertising "in keeping with the mission and philosophy of the organization"

== Madoff scandal ==
Hadassah invested some $40 million with Bernard Madoff Securities, beginning in 1988 with a $7 million gift from a French donor and adding $33 million over the following eight years. The investment initially proved quite profitable: through April 2007, Hadassah withdrew a total of $137 million.

Hadassah's balance of $90 million evaporated in December 2008, when the fund was revealed as a Ponzi scheme. Moreover, because Hadassah had profited from Madoff's scheme, it was targeted for "clawback" efforts by the trustee representing Madoff victims who lost money. After several months of negotiations, Hadassah agreed to contribute $45 million to a fund for Madoff's victims.

After testifying at Madoff's sentencing hearing and urging a long prison sentence for the disgraced financier, Hadassah's Chief Financial Officer, Sheryl Weinstein acknowledged a 20-year long adulterous affair with Madoff, during which period Hadassah had been investing heavily with him. As a result, the Young Judaea movement, which was previously solely funded by Hadassah lost millions in funding. The Young Judaea movement became independent of Hadassah in 2011.

== See also ==
- List of investors in Bernard L. Madoff Securities
- Health care in Israel
- Economy of Israel
- Education in Israel
- Hadassah Medical Center
