= Henrietta Szold =

American Zionist leader, political activist and editor

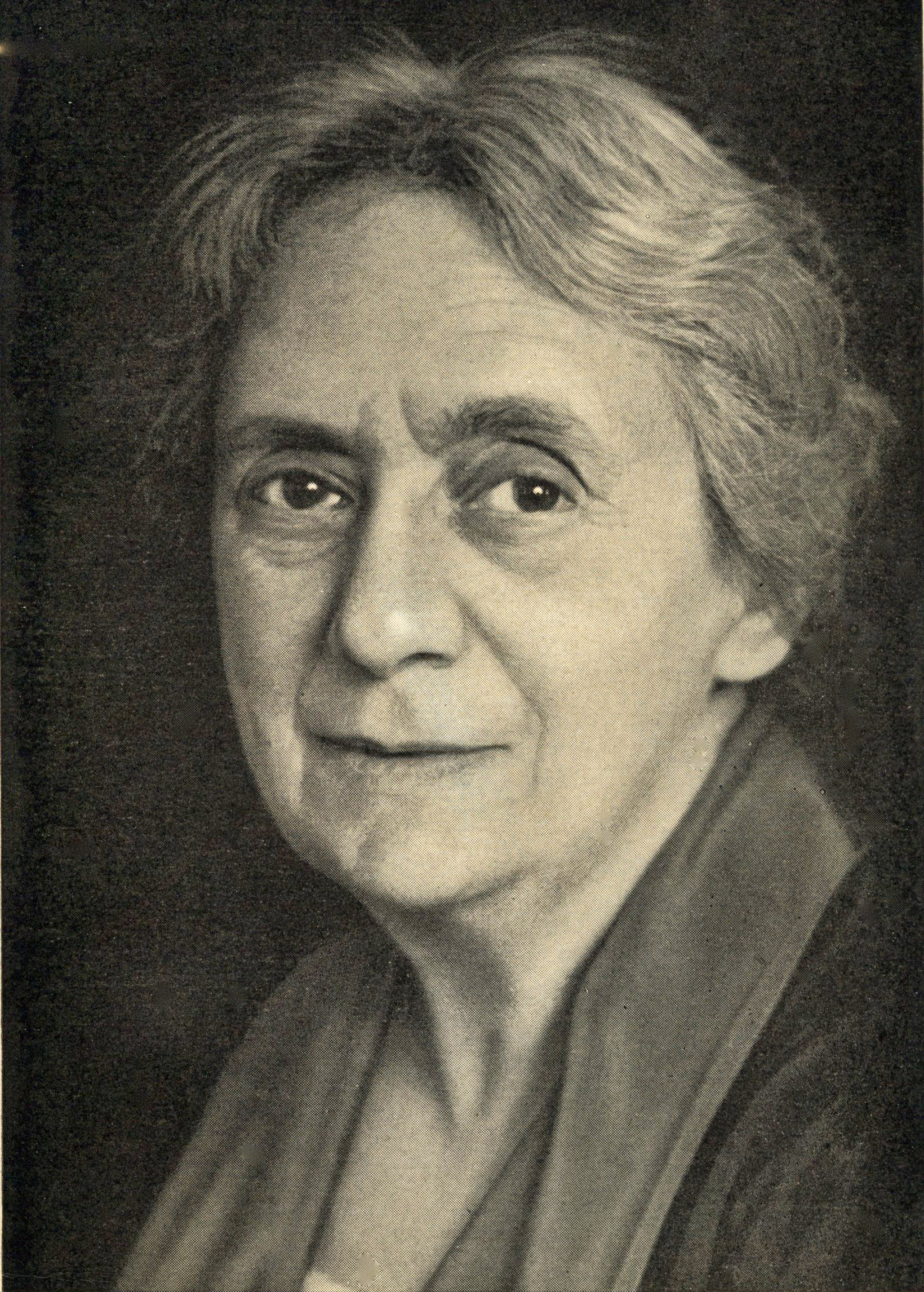
- Szold in 1940
- Born: December 21, 1860; Baltimore, Maryland, U.S.
- Died: February 13, 1945 (aged 84); Jerusalem, Mandatory Palestine
- Known for: Founder of Hadassah, the Women's Zionist Organization of America

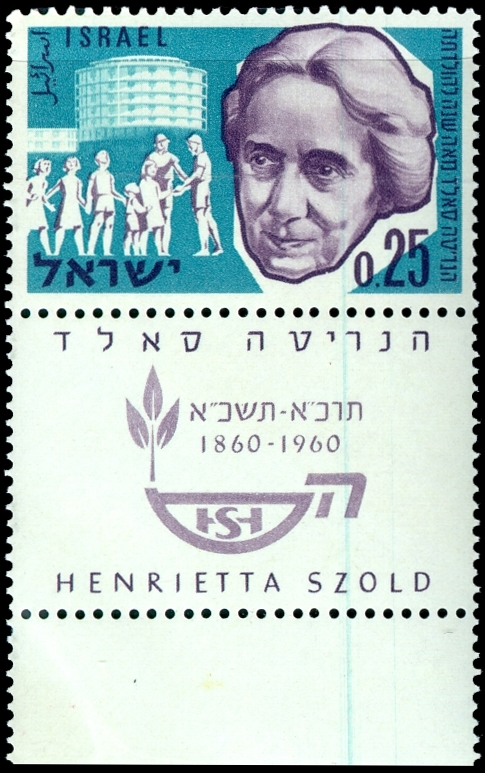
Henrietta Szold stamp

Henrietta Szold (/zoʊld/ ZOHLD, Hungarian: [ˈsold]; December 21, 1860 – February 13, 1945) was an American-born Jewish Zionist leader and founder of Hadassah, the Women's Zionist Organization of America. In 1942, she co-founded Ihud, a political party in Mandatory Palestine dedicated to a binational solution. An obituary in The New York Times described her as "the most brilliant woman in America."

== Biography ==
Henrietta Szold was born in Baltimore, Maryland, December 21, 1860. She was the daughter of Rabbi Benjamin Szold of Hungarian birth, who was the spiritual leader of Baltimore's Temple Oheb Shalom. Her mother was Sophie Schaar Szold. She was the eldest of eight daughters, and her younger sister Adele Szold-Seltzer was the translator of the first American edition of Maya the Bee.

In 1877, Henrietta Szold graduated from Western High School. For fifteen years she taught at Miss Adam's School and Oheb Shalom religious school, and gave Bible and history courses for adults. Highly educated in Jewish studies, she edited Professor Marcus Jastrow's Talmudic Dictionary. To further her own education, she attended public lectures at Johns Hopkins University and the Peabody Institute.

In 1902, Szold took classes in advanced Jewish studies at the Jewish Theological Seminary of America. However, its rabbinic school was restricted to males. Szold begged the school's president, Solomon Schechter, to allow her to study; he did only with the provision that she not seek ordination. Szold did well at the seminary, earning the respect of other students and faculty alike.

Szold never married and never had children of her own. While she was in her forties, she had an unrequited relationship with Talmudic scholar Rabbi Louis Ginzberg. He was fifteen years her junior, and he returned her feelings only platonically. After their relationship ended, she expressed her sadness: "Today it is four weeks since my only real happiness was killed." Years afterward, she said: "I would exchange everything for one child of my own."

Szold was the oldest of eight daughters and had no brothers. In Orthodox Judaism, it was not the norm for women to recite the Mourners' Kaddish. In 1916, Szold's mother died, and a friend, Hayim Peretz, offered to say Kaddish for her. In a letter, she thanked Peretz for his concern but said she would do it herself.

"I know well, and appreciate what you say about the Jewish custom; and Jewish custom is very dear and sacred to me. And yet I cannot ask you to say Kaddish after my mother. The Kaddish means to me that the survivor publicly and markedly manifests his wish and intention to assume the relation to the Jewish community, which his parent had, and that so the chain of tradition remains unbroken from generation to generation, each adding its own link. You can do that for the generations of your family, I must do that for the generations of my family."

Szold's answer to Peretz is cited by "Women and the Mourners' Kaddish," a responsum written by Conservative Rabbi David Golinkin. This responsum, adopted unanimously by Conservative Judaism's Va'ad Halakhah (Law Committee) of the Rabbinical Assembly of Israel, permits women to recite the Mourners' Kaddish in public when a minyan is present. Szold was religiously traditional, but advocated a larger role for women in Rabbinic Judaism.

== Pedagogic career and Zionist activism ==
Szold established the first American night school to provide English language instruction and vocational skills for Russian Jewish immigrants in Baltimore. Beginning in 1893, she worked as the first editor for the Jewish Publication Society, a position she retained for over 23 years. "The sole woman at the JPS, Szold's duties included the translation of a dozen works, writing articles of her own, editing the books, and overseeing the publication schedule.

In 1896, one month before Theodor Herzl published Der Judenstaat (The Jewish State), Szold described her vision of a Jewish state in Palestine as a place to ingather Diaspora Jewry and revive Jewish culture. In 1898, the Federation of American Zionists elected Szold as the only female member of its executive committee. During World War I, she was the only woman on the Provisional Executive Committee for General Zionist Affairs.

In 1899, she took on the lion's share of producing the first American Jewish Year Book, of which she was sole editor from 1904 to 1908. She also collaborated in the compilation of the Jewish Encyclopedia.

== Health, education and welfare ==
Her commitment to Zionism was heightened by a trip to Palestine in 1909, at age 49. Here, she discovered her life's mission: the health, education and welfare of the Yishuv (pre-state Jewish community of Palestine). Szold joined six other women to found Hadassah, which recruited American Jewish women to upgrade health care in Palestine. Hadassah's first project was the inauguration of an American-style visiting nurse program in Jerusalem. Hadassah funded hospitals, a medical school, dental facilities, x-ray clinics, infant welfare stations, soup kitchens and other services for Palestine's Jewish and Arab inhabitants. Szold persuaded her colleagues that practical programs open to all were critical to Jewish survival in the Holy Land. She founded Hadassah in 1912 and served as its president until 1926.

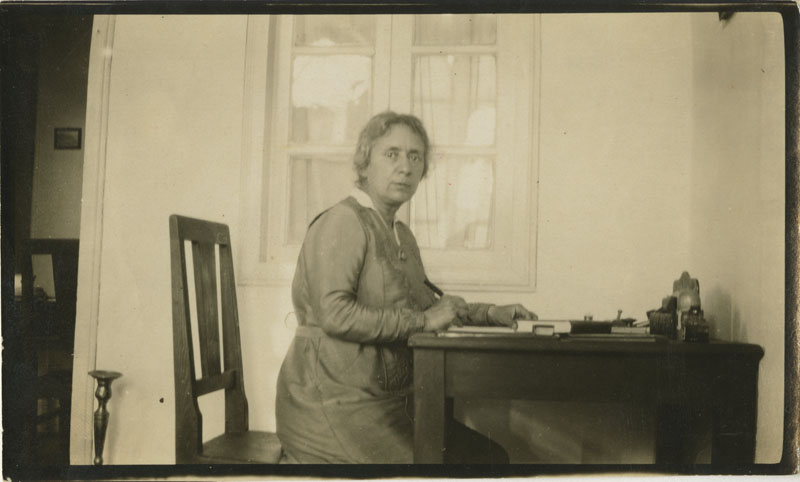
Henrietta Szold at her home in Jerusalem, c. 1922

In 1933, she immigrated to Palestine and helped run Youth Aliyah, an organization that rescued 30,000 Jewish children from Nazi Europe. In October 1934, Szold laid the cornerstone of the new Rothschild-Hadassah-University Hospital on Mount Scopus.

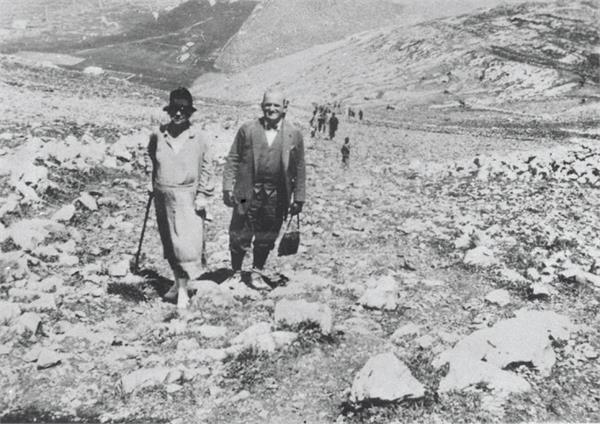
Henriette Szold visiting Galilee 1940

== Political activism ==
In the 1920s and 1930s, she supported Brit Shalom, a small organization dedicated to Arab-Jewish unity and a binational solution. In 1942, she was one of the co-founders of the Ihud party, which opposed the partition of Palestine.

== Death and burial ==
On February 13, 1945, at age 84, Szold died in the same Hadassah Hospital she helped to build in Jerusalem. She was buried in the Jewish Cemetery on the Mount of Olives in Jerusalem. From 1948 to 1967, the Mount of Olives was cut off from the rest of Jerusalem by the 1947–48 Civil War in Mandatory Palestine and the 1949 Armistice Agreements.

After Israel regained the region in the Six-Day War, Kalman Mann, then-director general of Hadassah Medical Center, went with a group of rabbis to the cemetery to assess the condition of Szold's grave. They found that it had been paved over by a road built by the Jordanians, who had also vandalized many grave markers.

They were able to locate Szold's burial site using a cemetery chart and "counting the indentations in the ground". The grave was later rebuilt and remarked with a new stone marker in an official ceremony.

== Awards and recognition ==
Kibbutz Kfar Szold, in Upper Galilee is named after her. The Palmach, in recognition of her commitment to "Aliyat Hanoar" Youth Aliyah, named the illegal immigration (Ha'apalah) ship "Henrietta Szold" after her. The ship, carrying immigrants from the Kiffisia orphanage in Athens, sailed from Piraeus on July 30, 1946, with 536 immigrants on board, and arrived on August 12, 1946. The passengers resisted capture, but were transferred to transport for Cyprus.

In 1949, Hadassah inaugurated the Henrietta Szold Prize, which was awarded that year to Eleanor Roosevelt.

The Henrietta Szold Institute, National Institute for Research in the Behavioral Sciences, located in Jerusalem, is named after her. The institute is Israel's foremost planner of behavioral science intervention and training programs.

Public School 134 on Manhattan's Lower East Side in New York City is also named after her.

In Israel, Mother's Day is celebrated on the day that Szold died, on the 30th of Shevat.

In the northwest corner of Szold's home city of Baltimore, Szold Drive, a short street in a residential neighborhood with homes built in the 1950s, is named after her as well. The northernmost part of the street is in Baltimore County.

In New York City, Szold Place, formerly Dry Dock Street runs from East 10th Street to East 12th Street in the East Village neighborhood of Manhattan.

In 2007, Szold was inducted into the National Women's Hall of Fame in Seneca Falls, New York.

== See also ==
- Benjamin Szold
- Robert Szold
- Zip Szold
