= List of New York City housing cooperatives =

A partial list of housing cooperatives in New York City.

== Projects originally built as housing cooperatives ==
- Alku and Alku Toinen, started in 1916 by Finnish immigrants
- Hudson View Gardens (1923–25), Hudson Heights, real estate developer Charles Paterno, architect George Fred Pelham Jr.
- United Workers Cooperative Colony (1927–1929), 339 + 385 units, on Allerton Avenue on the Bronx, sponsored by communist garment industry workers; known as "The Communist Coops"
- Dunbar Apartments, built by John D. Rockefeller Jr. in 1928 as a housing cooperative to provide housing for African Americans. Bankrupt in 1936 and taken over by Rockefeller.

Sponsored by Amalgamated Clothing Workers of America, Architects Springsteen and Goldhammer, Herman Jessor

- Amalgamated Housing Cooperative (1927, 1947–49, expansion 1952–55, 1968–70 Bronx, "The Amalgamated", 1,435 units; still operating as a co-operative
- Amalgamated Dwellings (1930), in Cooperative Village, Lower East Side of Manhattan, New York City, 236 units
- Hillman Housing Corporation (1947–1950), in Cooperative Village, 807 units

Under the Housing Development Fund Corporation

- 566 W. 159th Street, Washington Heights
- 1007-09 E. 174th Street, the Bronx
- Lenox Court, East Harlem

Sponsored by the United Housing Foundation and International Ladies' Garment Workers' Union. Architects George W. Springsteen and Herman Jessor

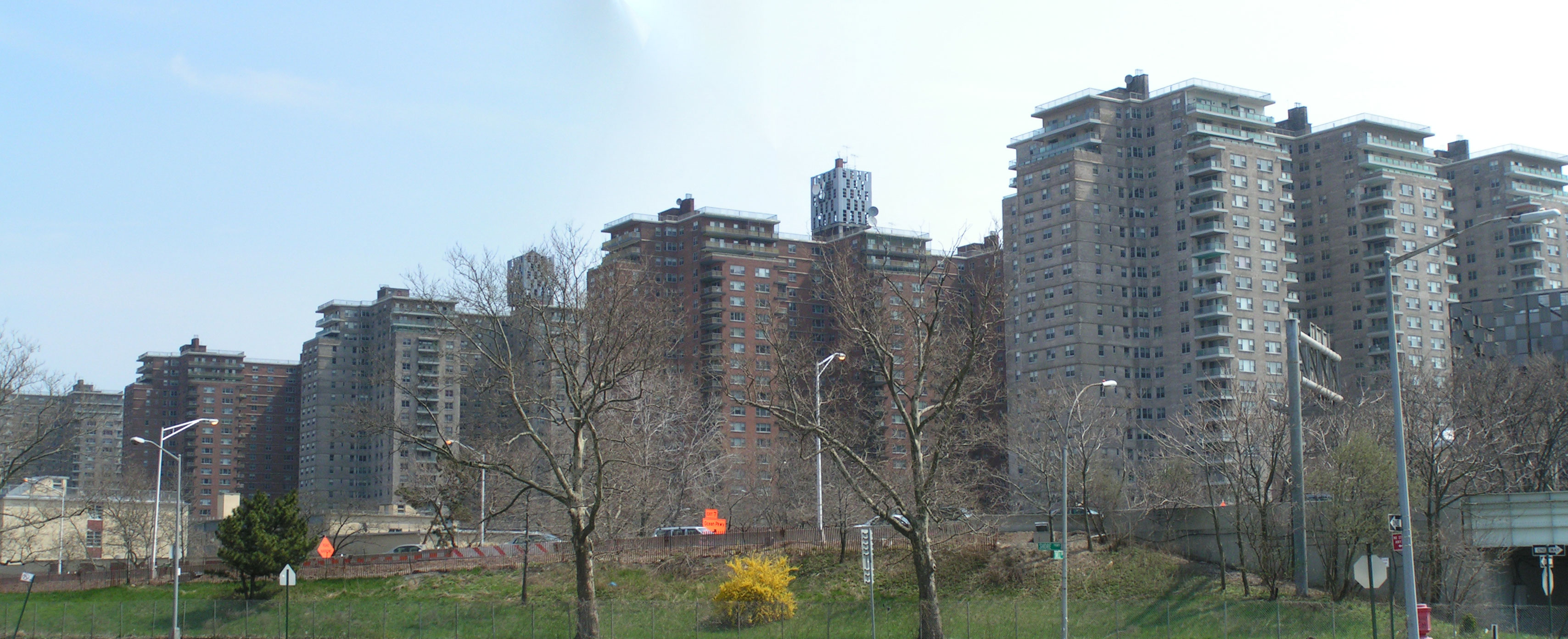
Amalgamated Warbasse Houses on Coney Island

- East River Houses, (1956), in Cooperative Village, 1,672 units,
- Seward Park Housing Corporation, in Cooperative Village, 1,728 units
- Mutual Houses and Park Reservoir Housing Corporation (1955), Bronx affiliated with Amalgamated Housing
- Penn South (1962), 2,820 units, Chelsea, Manhattan
- Rochdale Village (1965), 5,860 units, central Queens
- Amalgamated Warbasse Houses (1965), 2,585 units, Coney Island, Brooklyn
- Amalgamated Towers (1969), 316 units (see "Amalgamated Housing Cooperative" above)
- Co-op City (1968–1971), Baychester area of the Bronx 15,382 units

Mitchell-Lama Housing Program

- Morningside Gardens (1957), Morningside Heights
- Southbridge Towers (1969), Lower Manhattan
- Confucius Plaza (1975), Chinatown, Manhattan
- River Terrace Co-op (1963)
- River View Towers (1963)
- Inwood Terrace (1959)

== Converted rental property ==
- Castle Village (1939, 1985), real estate developer Charles Paterno, architect George Fred Pelham Jr.

== See also ==
- List of condominiums in the United States
