= Hugo Gellert =

Hungarian-American illustrator and muralist

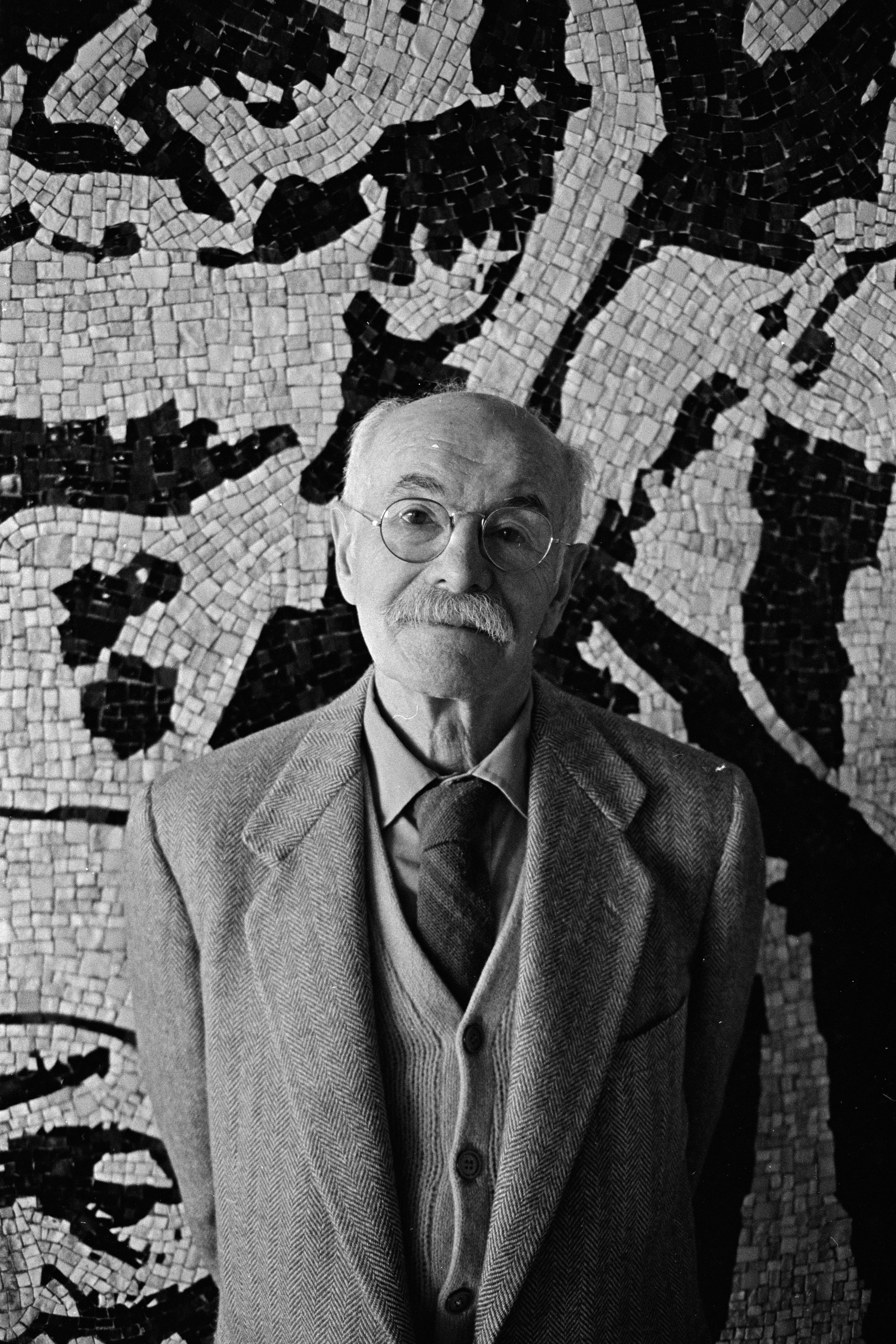
Gellert in 1972

Hugo Gellert (born Hugó Grünbaum; May 3, 1892 – December 9, 1985) was a Hungarian-American illustrator and muralist. A committed radical and member of the Communist Party of America, Gellert created much work for political activism in the 1920s and 1930s. It was distinctive in style, considered by some art critics as among the best political work of the first half of the 20th century.

His family immigrated to New York in 1906. Gellert studied in art schools in New York. His illustrations were first published in radical Hungarian and American magazines, but in the 1920s Gellert worked as a staff artist for The New Yorker magazine and The New York Times newspaper. Although he was opposed to United States' entry into World War I, when conditions were worsening in Europe in 1939 after the rise of Nazi Germany, Gellert helped organize "Artists for Defense"; he later became chairman of "Artists for Victory", which included over 10,000 members.

== Biography ==
=== Early years ===
Hugo Gellert (Hungarian: Gellért Hugó) was born Hugó Grünbaum on May 3, 1892, in Budapest, Hungary, to a Jewish family. In 1906, the family immigrated to the United States, arriving in New York City. They settled there and changed their surname.

Gellert studied at the Cooper Union and the National Academy of Design. He married a woman named Livia Cinquegrana, also an artist.

=== Art and politics ===
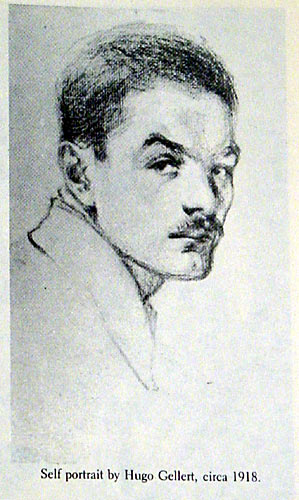
Self-portrait c. 1918

Gellert, a committed socialist who later joined the Communist Party of America, considered his politics inseparable from his art. In a speech titled "The Role of die Communist Artist," he said that "Being a Communist and being an artist are but two cheeks of the same face and, as for me, I fail to see how I can be one, without also being the other." He used his art to advance his ideals for the common people. His advice to young artists was to "Go out in the street and demonstrate. Yell like hell." Much of his art depicted what he saw as the injustices of racial divides and capitalism. Often his works were captioned with slogans to further the illustration. The Working Day, for example shows a black laborer standing back to back with a white miner. It is accompanied by a phrase from Karl Marx's Das Kapital, "Labor with a white skin cannot emancipate itself where labor with a black skin is branded."

=== Art as politics ===
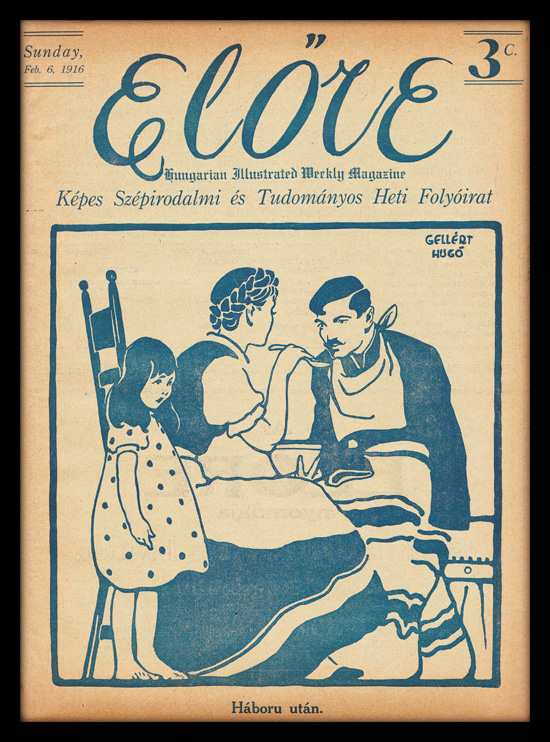
"Out of the War." This cover image of an armless veteran being spoon-fed, from a February 1916 issue of Előre, exemplifies Gellert's radical anti-militarism.

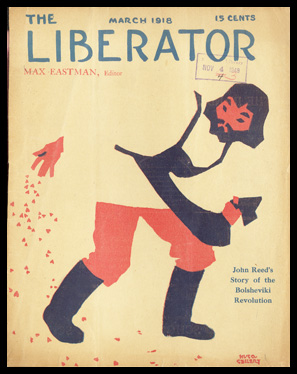
Gellert did the cover art for first issue of The Liberator in March 1918, the seminal American radical magazine.

Opposed to World War I, Gellert published his first anti-war art in 1916. His work was prominently featured both in the illustrated magazine of the Hungarian Socialist Federation of the Socialist Party of America, Előre (Forward), as well as Max Eastman's radical monthly magazine The Masses from this time. He also created numerous illustrations for Eastman's successor magazine, The Liberator, as well as sundry publications of the Communist Party USA after its formation, such as The Workers Monthly and The New Masses. Later, Gellert was offered a position as a staff artist for The New Yorker magazine. In 1925, he moved to the New York Times.

In 1927, Gellert was appointed the leader of the Anti-Horthy League, the first American anti-fascist organization. In this capacity, he organized a demonstration against U.S. president Calvin Coolidge, and both he and his wife were arrested while picketing the White House.

In 1932, the Museum of Modern Art in New York City, feeling uncomfortable about Gellert's public persona and politics, petitioned to have Gellert's work removed from its collection. However, they were forced to reconsider when other artists, a number of whom did not share Gellert's social idealism, came to his defense as fellow artists and threatened to withdraw their own works.

In 1934 Gellert was among the leaders of the Artists Committee of Action, an informal group which had formed to protest Nelson Rockefeller's destruction of Diego Rivera's mural Man at the Crossroads early in the year at Rockefeller Center. Gellert was instrumental in the establishment of Art Front magazine, which started publication in November 1934 and was at first jointly published by the ACA and the Artists Union.

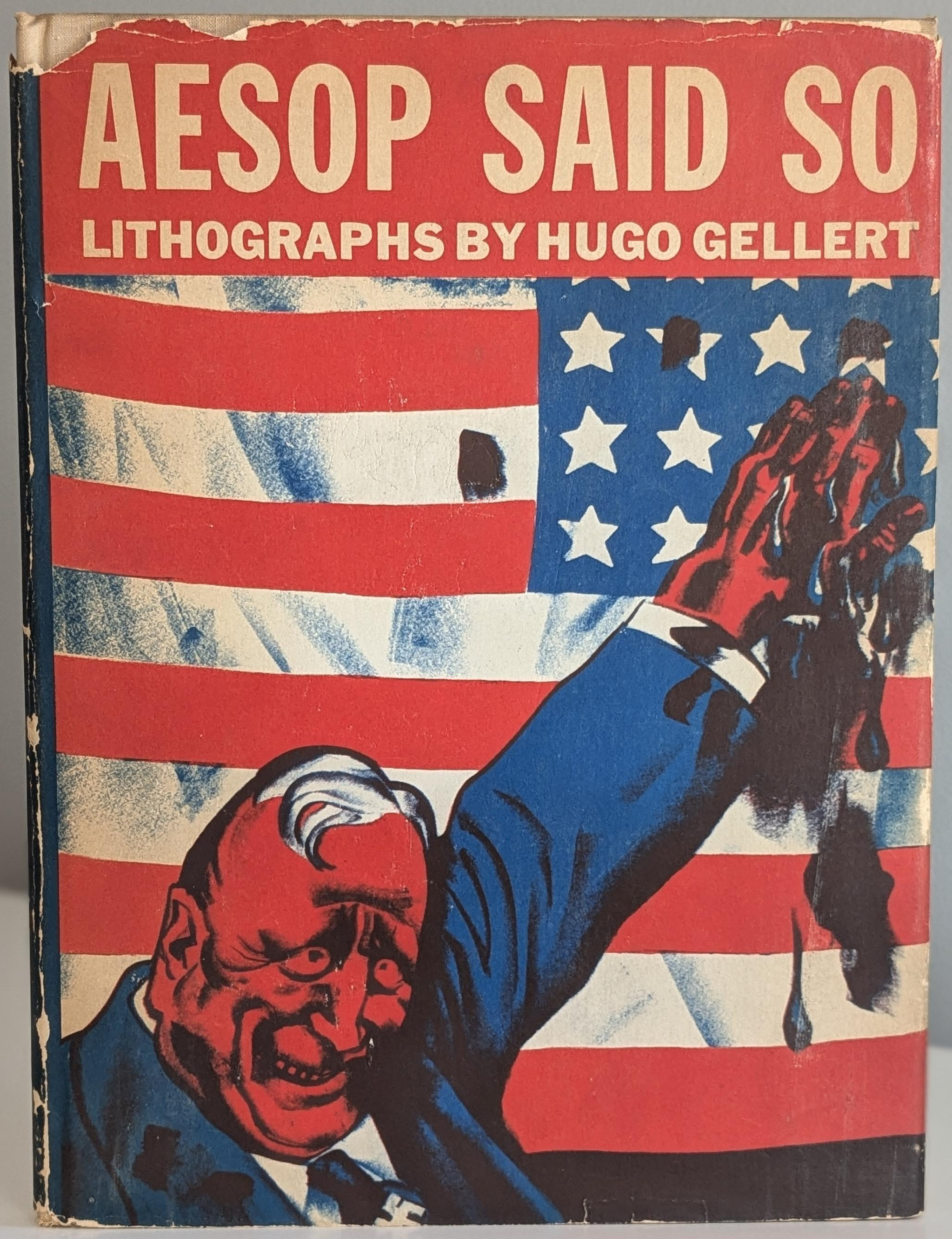
The cover of Aesop Said So, Gellert's book of lithographs, 1936

In 1939, Gellert helped organize the group, "Artists for Defense". He later became the chairman for "Artists for Victory", an organization that included over 10,000 members.

His communist sympathies attracted political persecution from the McCarthyist ruling order in the United States. As McCarthyist persecution intensified, Gellert left the United States with his wife Livia to her native Australia in November 1945, but returned to the US after three years.

A 1994 Freedom of Information Act request to the Federal Bureau of Investigation (FBI) revealed the agency investigated the artist, as well as his brother Otto Gellert, for decades, collecting approximately 3000 pages on the artist. These records showed that the agency began surveiling him as early as 1920, but more thorough investigation began from July 1941 onwards, only ceasing in the 1970s. The files included "photographs of him, examples of his handwriting... as well as research and reports by confidential informants into his citizenship status, his affiliations, his movements domestically and internationally, and his income and expenditures." One Special Agent noted that Gellert was considered "potentially dangerous because of his power of appeal as a cartoonist".

In encounters between the Bureau and Gellert, the artist was uncompromisingly uncooperative. In one such interaction, FBI agents surveiling Gellert attempted to introduce themselves to the artist by extending their hand; Gellert apparently "loudly and vehemently stated, 'I have nothing to say to you,'" before walking away rapidly in the direction of his home.

Shortly after this incident, Gellert was summoned to appear in front of the House Committee on Un-American Activities. Testified before the Committee on November 13, 1956. With a few exceptions, Gellert refused to answer almost all of their questions, invoked the Fifth Amendment. This experience left Gellert largely unscathed, as he was not deported, but it hurt his finances, as he found fewer and fewer opportunities for him to earn money as a result of the suspicion.

== Death and legacy ==
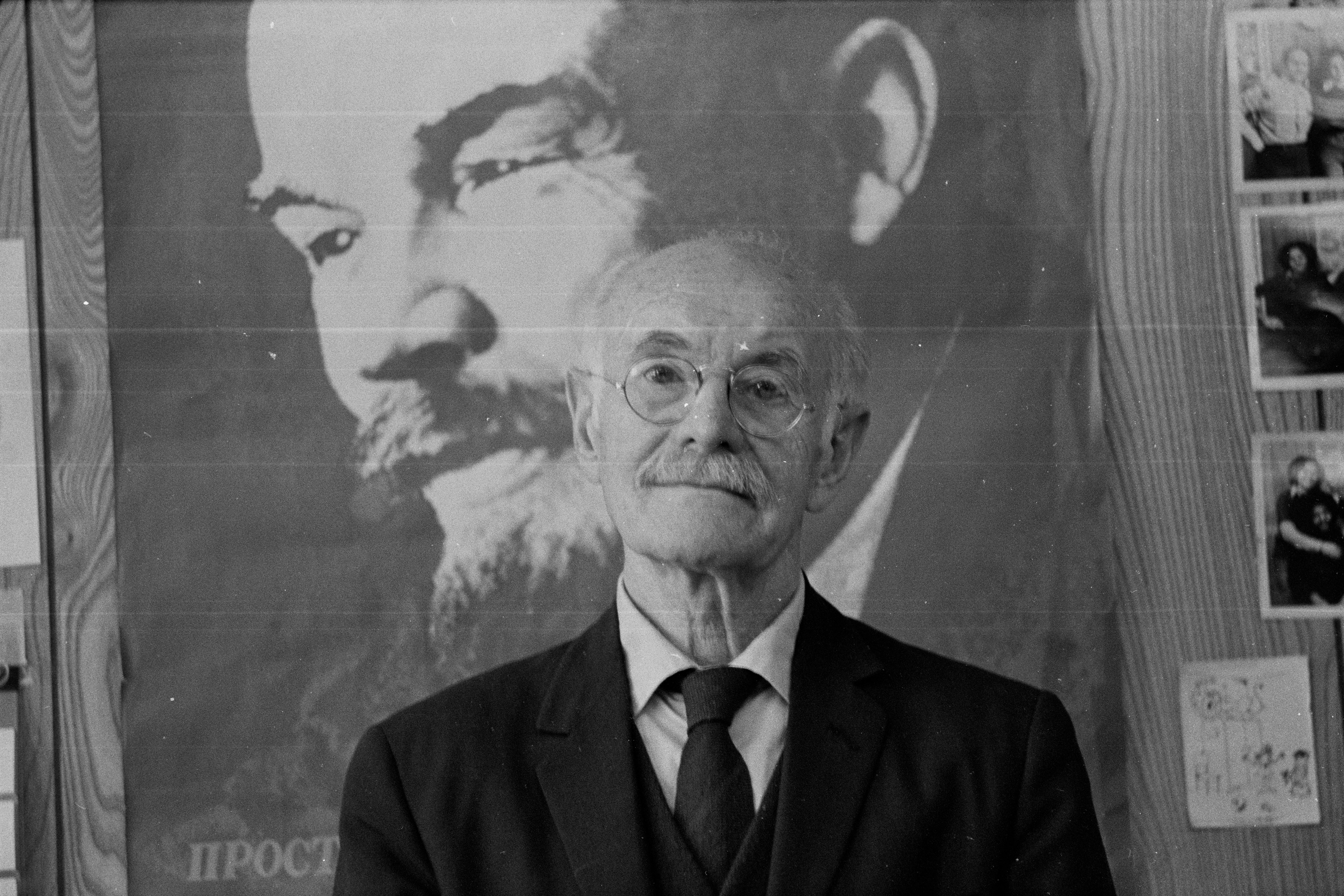
Gellert in 1975

Gellert died in Freehold Township, New Jersey on December 9, 1985. He was a communist stalwart to his dying day; when Paul Avrich interviewed him in 1972, Gellert was firm in his convictions "that the Soviet Union was a workers’ state, that workers’ councils controlled the factories and ran the economy, that Stalin was a great leader who saved the world from Hitler, and so on".

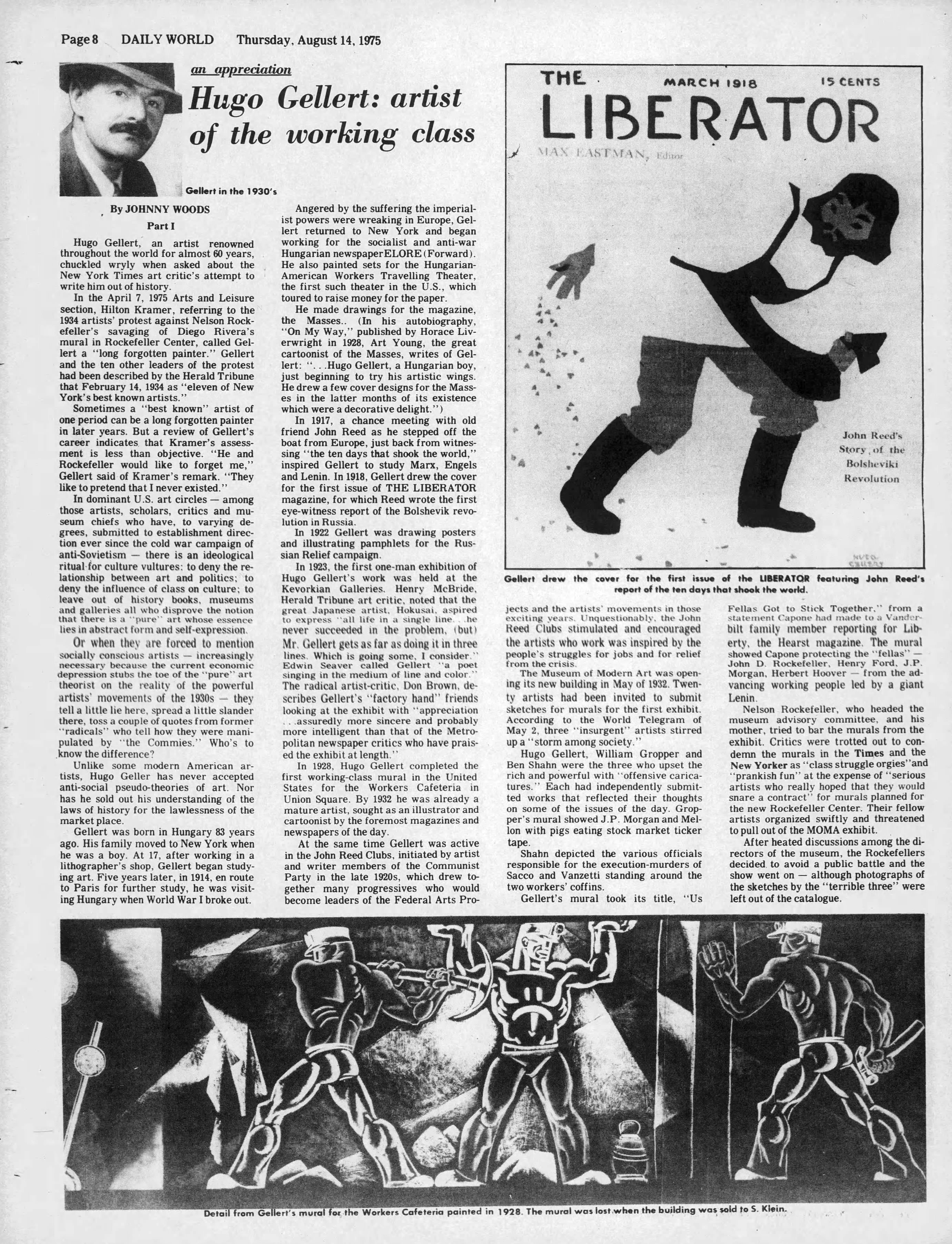
An article by Johnny Woods about Gellert published in the Daily World, August 14, 1975

Gellert's social commentary, his work and his beliefs have placed him among the greatest American social artists of the Art Deco era, according to experts in the field.

His brother Ernest, also a socialist, was drafted in 1917 but refused induction, claiming to be a conscientious objector. He was convicted of refusing the draft and sentenced to prison. Gellert fled to Mexico after Ernest died of a gunshot wound in prison at Fort Hancock, New Jersey, officially a suicide. Their brother Lawrence was a music collector; in the 1930s he documented black protest traditions in the South of the United States.

Although remembered for his art in print, Gellert also painted a number of public murals and frescoes. Among the surviving frescoes is the series that adorn the front entryways of each of the four buildings of the Seward Park Housing Corporation, a housing cooperative with 1728 apartments, designed and built by Herman Jessor as part of the social housing cooperatives built by the Abraham Kazan and the United Housing Foundation. In 2003, the series became the topic of controversy after the cooperative converted from its limited equity status to a fully private and market-rate residential co-op. The cooperative attempted to remove or destroy the four giant Gellert murals. The Co-op board felt the socialist-style paintings were no longer representative of the people or the Lower East Side neighborhood.

Public protests and letter writing, inspired threats of legal action and other possible setbacks, caused the plan to be delayed. Gellert's artwork can still be seen in each of the buildings.

== Publications ==
- The Mirrors of Wall Street. Text by Anonymous, drawings by Gellert. New York: G.P. Putnam's Sons, 1933.
- Karl Marx, Das Kapital in Lithographs. New York: R. Long and R.R. Smith, 1934.
- Comrade Gulliver: An Illustrated Account of Travel into that Strange Country the United States of America. New York: G.P. Putnam's Sons, 1935.
- "Aesop Said So". New York: Covici Friede, 1936.
- Gellert, Lawrence (1936). Negro songs of protest. Illustrated by Hugo Gellert. New York, N.Y.: American music league. LCCN 36036401.
- Wallace, Henry A., Century of the common man (1943)

== Bibliography ==
- Wechsler, James (2003). The art and activism of Hugo Gellert: Embracing the specter of Communism (PhD thesis). City University of New York. ISBN 0496315250. ProQuest 305331828.
