= Andrew St. John (bishop) =

Andrew Reginald St. John is an Australian retired Anglican bishop. In the Anglican Church of Australia, he was a regional bishop in the Diocese of Melbourne from 1995 to 2001. He has since held various roles in the Episcopal Church of America.

== Early life and education ==
The youngest of five children, St. John was born and educated in Melbourne. He graduated from Wesley College in 1961 and attended law school before training for ordination at Trinity College. He became a deacon in 1971 and a priest in 1972. Later, in 1983, he continued his studies at General Theological Seminary in New York City.

== Career ==
St. John was a curate in the Melbourne suburbs and at St Mary the Virgin parish church in Primrose Hill, London, before become precentor and minor canon of St Paul's Cathedral, Melbourne, in 1975. He later served in parishes around Melbourne, including 11 years as rector of Holy Trinity Church in Kew, Victoria. In 1995 he was appointed as a regional assistant bishop in the Diocese of Melbourne as Bishop of the Western Region.

After retiring in 2001, St. John moved to New York, serving as interim rector of Holy Trinity Church on East 88th Street for two years. From 2005 to 2016 he was rector of the Church of the Transfiguration (also known as the Little Church Around the Corner), where he strengthened the church's relationship with the Episcopal Actors' Guild. He then became interim rector of the Church of the Holy Apostles for two years, where he oversaw the Holy Apostles Soup Kitchen. He is currently honorary bishop in residence at St Thomas Church, Fifth Avenue.
