= Kingsbridge Heights, Bronx =

Neighborhood in New York City

Kingsbridge Heights
- Neighborhood of the Bronx
- Interactive map of Kingsbridge Heights
- Coordinates: 40.872°N 73.902°W
- Country: United States
- State: New York
- City: New York City
- Borough: The Bronx
- Community District: Bronx 8

Economics
- ZIP Codes: 10463, 10468
- Area code: 718, 347, 929, and 917
- Website: kingsbridgeheights.nyc

Kingsbridge Heights is a residential neighborhood geographically located in the northwest Bronx, New York City. Its boundaries are Van Cortlandt Park to the north, Jerome Avenue to the east, Kingsbridge Road to the south, and the Major Deegan Expressway to the west. Sedgwick Avenue is the primary thoroughfare through Kingsbridge Heights.

The neighborhood is part of Bronx Community District 8, and its ZIP Codes include 10463 and 10468. The area is patrolled by the 50th and 52nd Precincts of the New York City Police Department. NYCHA property in the area is patrolled by P.S.A. 8 at 2794 Randall Avenue in the Throgs Neck section of the Bronx.

== Demographics ==
Based on data from the 2010 United States census, the population of Kingsbridge Heights was 32,496, a decrease of 790 (2.4%) from the 33,286 counted in 2000. Covering an area of 300.86 acres (121.75 ha), the neighborhood had a population density of 108.0 inhabitants per acre (69,100/sq mi; 26,700/km^{2}).

The racial makeup of the neighborhood was 4.3% (1,389) White, 18.5% (6,004) African American, 0.1% (46) Native American, 4.7% (1,514) Asian, 0.0% (2) Pacific Islander, 0.4% (124) from other races, and 1.0% (322) from two or more races. Hispanic or Latino of any race were 71.1% (23,095) of the population.

The neighborhood has a high concentration of Dominicans especially in the southern and central sections of the neighborhood. In these two areas over 30% of the population lives below the poverty line. A small aging White non-Hispanic population is concentrated near Van Cortlandt Park or Van Cortlandt Village. In more recent years young professionals, mostly White non-Hispanic, have started to move into Van Cortlandt Village. The vast majority of households are renter occupied.

Due to White flight some of the homes in the southern and central parts of the area have been left vacant. Many homes today are being rehabilitated and offered as rentals to the booming Dominican population found in the area.

== Land use and terrain ==
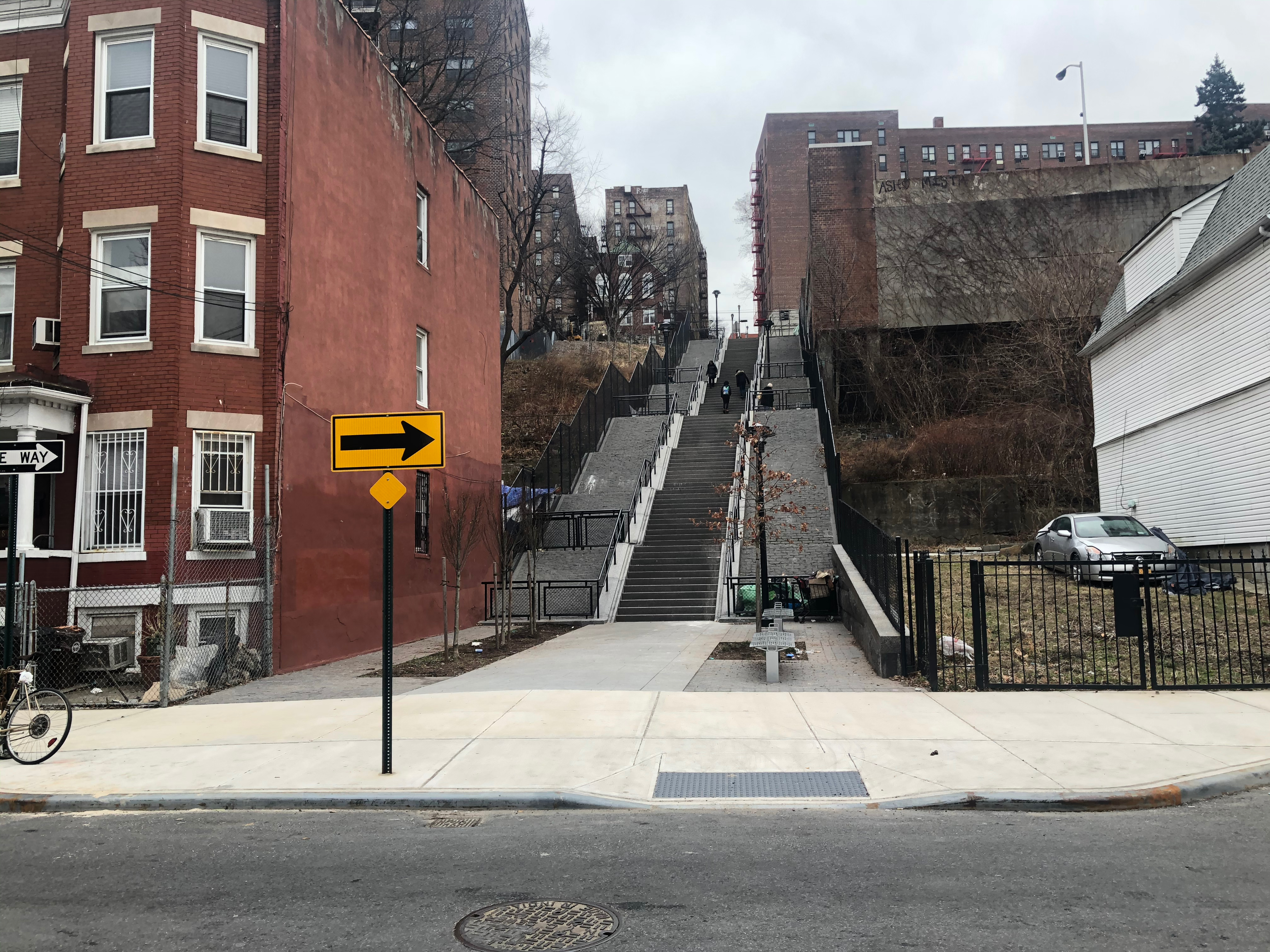
Kingsbridge Heights is hilly and has step streets

Kingsbridge Heights is dominated by multi-unit detached homes. There is also a significant presence of tenement buildings concentrated mostly in the central and southern sections of the neighborhood.

In the 21st century due to intense gentrification, the northern subsection known as Van Cortlandt Village has seen an increase in higher-end rental and co-op building construction. This subsection is bordered by the Major Deegan Expressway to the west, the Jerome Park Reservoir to the east, W 238th Street to the south, and Van Cortlandt Park to the north. In 2007, MSNBC called Van Cortlandt Village one of "America's next hot neighborhoods".

The Fort Independence Street-Heath Avenue Houses are a one, 21-story NYCHA development in Kingsbridge Heights.

=== Landmarks ===
The Jerome Park Reservoir is the most dominant landmark in the area. It was originally part of the Bathgate Estate that was later purchased by Leonard Jerome and Associates, to build The Jerome Park Racetrack. The Jerome Park Reservoir replaced the racetrack and was built in 1906 to serve the Croton Aqueduct as part of the New York City water supply system. The perimeter of this reservoir is approximately 2.2 miles.

Kingsbridge Armory is on Kingsbridge Road.

In 1866, Jerome bought the estate and mansion of James Bathgate near Old Fordham Village in what was then rural Westchester County, but is now The Bronx. Jerome and financier August Belmont Sr. built Jerome Park Racetrack on the Bathgate land; the first Belmont Stakes was held there in 1867. Jerome and his brother Lawrence had a wide boulevard made from Macombs Dam to the track, which city authorities attempted to name "Murphy Avenue" after a local politician. This incensed Jerome's wife so much that she had bronze plaques saying "Jerome Avenue" made up and bolted into place along the road, forcing the city to accept the name. The racetrack was acquired and demolished by the city in 1894, to make way for Jerome Park Reservoir. The Bathgate mansion served as a summer home for the Jerome family. In the early 1900s, the mansion was razed and replaced by the Kingsbridge Armory.

2744 Kingsbridge Terrace, called the Castle of Kingsbridge, was built in 1914 by Samuel B. Reed.

== Police and crime ==
Kingsbridge Heights is patrolled by the 50th Precinct of the NYPD, located at 3450 Kingsbridge Avenue. The 50th Precinct ranked 13th safest out of 69 patrol areas for per-capita crime in 2010.

The 50th Precinct has a lower crime rate than in the 1990s, with crimes across all categories having decreased by 69.9% between 1990 and 2022. The precinct reported three murders, 22 rapes, 185 robberies, 213 felony assaults, 126 burglaries, 695 grand larcenies, and 288 grand larcenies auto in 2022.

== Fire safety ==
Kingsbridge Heights contains a New York City Fire Department (FDNY) fire station, Engine Co. 81/Ladder Co. 46, at 3025 Bailey Avenue.

== Education ==
=== Schools ===
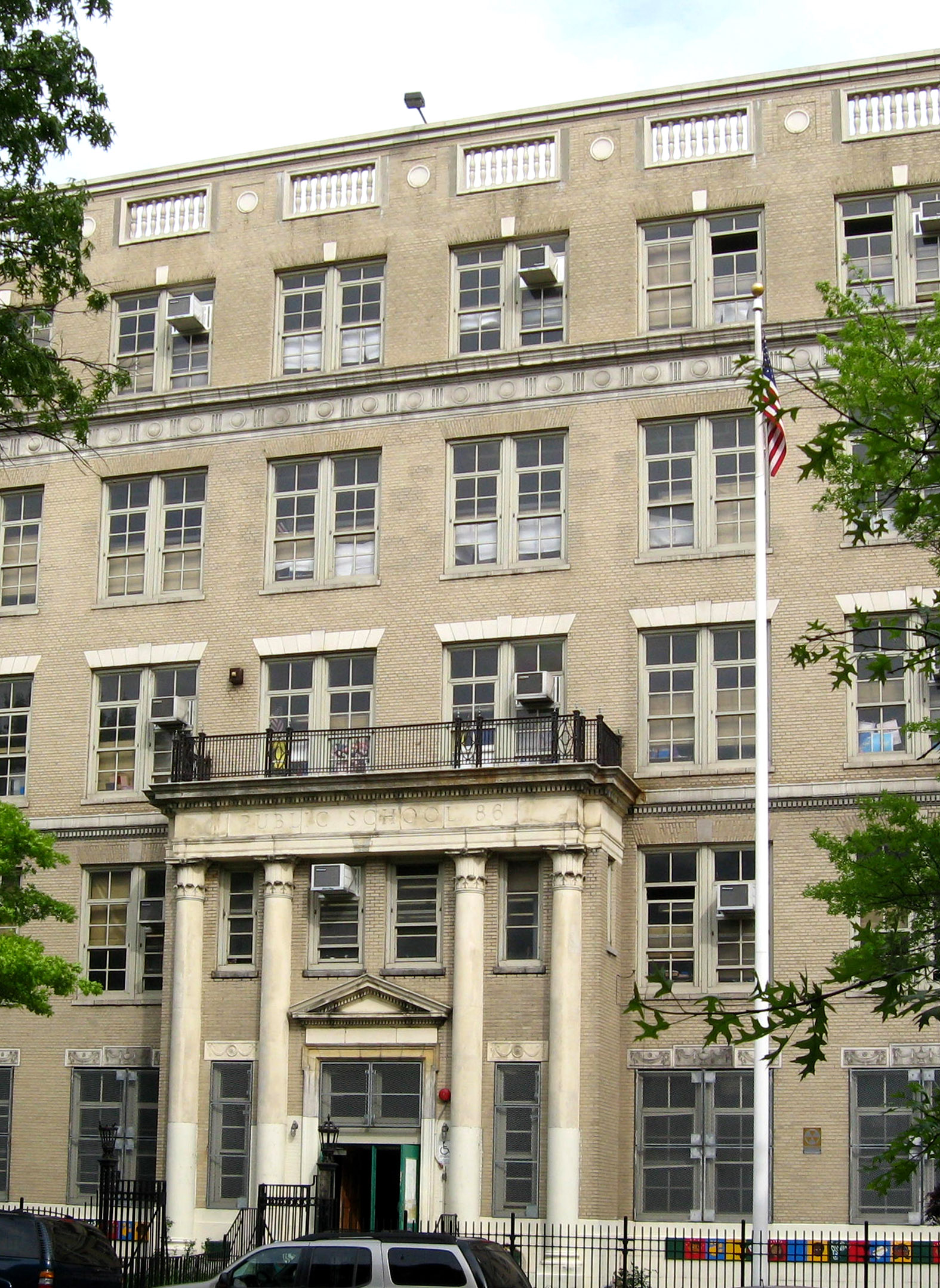
PS 86

Public schools are operated by the New York City Department of Education. Kingsbridge Heights contains the following public elementary schools which serve grades PK-5 unless otherwise indicated:

- PS 86 Kingsbridge Heights (grades PK–6)
- PS 307 Eames Place (grades K–5)
- PS 310 Marble Hill
- PS 340
- PS 360

The following middle school serves grades 6–8:

- New School for Leadership and Journalism

The following high schools serve grades 9–12:

- Celia Cruz Bronx High School of Music
- Discovery High School
- High School for Teaching and the Professions
- Kingsbridge International High School
- Marie Curie High School for Nursing, Medicine, and Health
- Bronx High School of Science

=== Library ===
The New York Public Library (NYPL) operates the Jerome Park branch at 118 Eames Place. The branch first opened in 1957, but moved to its current one-story structure in 1969 and was renovated in 2007.

== Transportation ==
The following MTA Regional Bus Operations bus routes serve Kingsbridge Heights:

- Bx1: to Riverdale or Third Avenue–138th Street station (6 and <6> trains ) (via Grand Concourse)
- Bx2: to Third Avenue–138th Street station (6 and <6> trains) (via Grand Concourse)
- Bx3: to 238th Street station (1 train) or George Washington Bridge Bus Station (via University Avenue)
- Bx9: to Riverdale or West Farms Square–East Tremont Avenue station (2 and 5 trains, via East Kingsbridge Road)
- Bx10: to Riverdale or Norwood–205th Street station (D train) (via Kappock Street)
- Bx22: to Castle Hill (via Castle Hill Avenue)
- Bx32: to Third Avenue–138th Street station (6 and <6> trains) (via Morris and Jerome Avenues)
- BxM3: express to Yonkers or Midtown Manhattan

The following New York City Subway station serves Kingsbridge Heights:

- Kingsbridge Road station (4 train)
