= Church of the Holy Apostles (Manhattan) =

Church in Manhattan, New York

- U.S. National Register of Historic Places
- New York State Register of Historic Places
- New York City Landmark
- (2026)

- Location within New York City Location within New York Location within the United States
- Location: 296 Ninth Ave. Manhattan, New York City
- Coordinates: 40°44′57″N 73°59′57″W
- Built: 1845-48; 1853-54; 1858
- Architect: Minard Lafever; Charles Babcock
- Architectural style: Italianate
- NRHP reference No.: 72000867
- NYSRHP No.: 06101.000439

Significant dates
- Added to NRHP: April 26, 1972
- Designated NYSRHP: June 23, 1980
- Designated NYCL: October 19, 1966

The Church of the Holy Apostles is an Episcopal parish located at 296 Ninth Avenue at 28th Street in the Chelsea neighborhood of Manhattan, New York City. Its historic church building was built from 1845 to 1848, and was designed by New York architect Minard Lafever. The geometric stained-glass windows were designed by William Jay Bolton. The church faces Chelsea Park across 9th Avenue. The building is a New York City landmark and on the National Register of Historic Places.

The church reported 179 members in 2018 and 112 members in 2023; no membership statistics were reported in 2024 parochial reports. Plate and pledge income reported for the congregation in 2024 was $194,219 with average Sunday attendance (ASA) of 65 persons.

== History ==
The Holy Apostles congregation "was founded in 1844 as the result of an outreach by Trinity Church to immigrants who worked on the Hudson River waterfront to the west of the Church’s location in the Chelsea section of Manhattan", evolving out of a Sunday school. Construction on the sanctuary began in 1845 and continued through 1848, although Lafever enlarged the building by 25 feet by adding a chancel in 1853–54. In 1858 the congregation needed to expand, so architect Charles Babcock of the firm of Richard Upjohn & Son enlarged the building into a cross-shaped sanctuary with the addition of transepts.

The church, the only one that Lafever designed which remains extant in Manhattan, is also one of the very few there of Italianate design, although the church has also been described as an early example of Romanesque Revival architecture. The vestry is in "pure Tuscan" style. Lafever's sanctuary was a three-aisled basilica. The ceiling was vaulted with plaster groins "small in scale but beautiful in proportion." Original Lafever touches in the details include the corbels from which the ribs spring.

The church's congregation has always been a socially active one. It is rumored that the church was a stop on the Underground Railroad during the American Civil War. In the 1970s, the church was instrumental in the foundation of Congregation Beit Simchat Torah, a synagogue for gays and lesbians begun by Jacob Gubbay. It hosted the congregation from 1973 to 1975, and again from December 1998 until it found a permanent home in April 2016. In that same decade, Holy Apostles hosted the ordination of the first woman priest (and openly lesbian) in the New York diocese, Rev. Ellen Barrett. In 1982, the congregation began the Holy Apostles Soup Kitchen, which continues to serve the indigent of the area.

The Church of the Holy Apostles is located in Penn South, a housing cooperative. During the construction of Penn South in 1959, builders considered demolishing the church to make way for Penn South. Ultimately, four churches on the site, including the Church of the Holy Apostles, were saved. The UHF's president, Abraham Kazan, later called the preservation a "mistake" because it had prevented Penn South from being developed earlier.

The sanctuary was badly damaged in 1990 by a fire, in which some of the stained-glass windows were lost, but most survived without serious damage. A restoration began almost immediately, and was completed in 1994 under the supervision of Ed Kamper, without interruption of the social services the church provides.

The Church of the Holy Apostles was designated a New York City landmark in 1966, and was added to the National Register of Historic Places in 1972.

"Hungry Minds," an extensive profile in The New Yorker's May 26, 2008, issue, gives an account of the church's history with special attention given to the soup kitchen and the writing workshop that Frazier and others conducted there.

== See also ==
- Holy Apostles Soup Kitchen
