= Cooperative Village =

Housing cooperatives in Manhattan, New York

Coordinates: 40.713968°N 73.979976°W

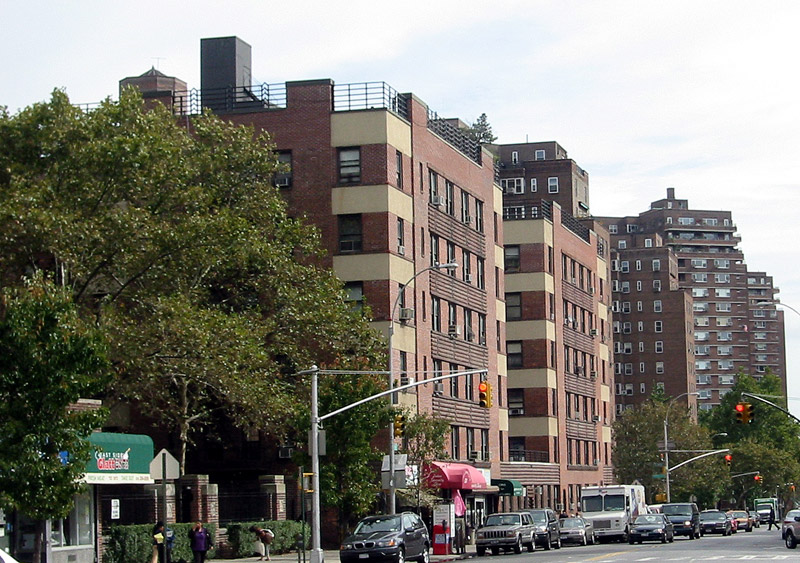
View of Grand Street. Amalgamated Dwellings (1930) in the foreground with two of the Hillman Housing buildings (1947–50) behind it. One of the East River Housing towers (1953–56) in the background.

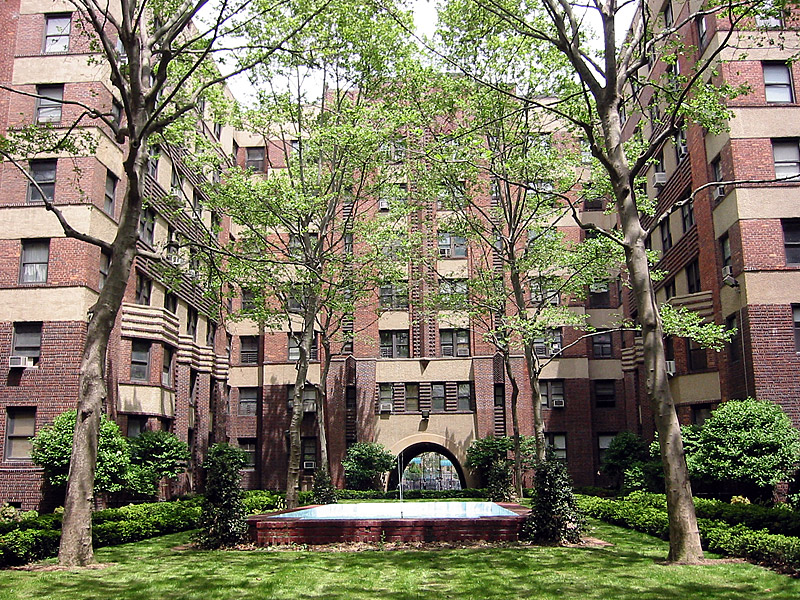
The enclosed courtyard of Amalgamated Dwellings

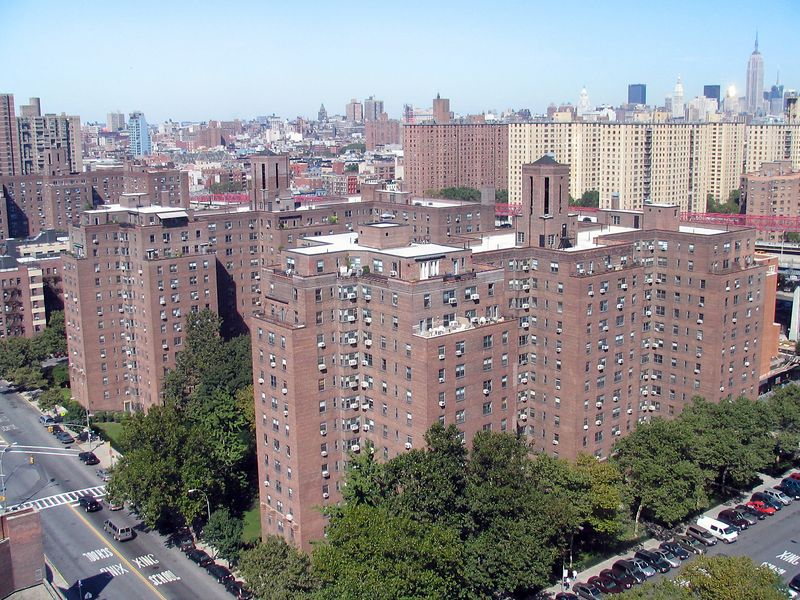
Hillman Housing buildings on Grand Street as seen from the East River towers. Amalgamated Dwellings is seen between the second and the third tower

Cooperative Village is a community of housing cooperatives on the Lower East Side of Manhattan, New York City. The cooperatives are centered on Grand Street in an area south of the entrance ramp to the Williamsburg Bridge and west of the FDR Drive. Combined, the four cooperatives have 4,500 apartments in twelve buildings.

The cooperatives were sponsored, organized and built by trade unions, the Amalgamated Clothing Workers of America and International Ladies' Garment Workers' Union, as well as the United Housing Foundation, a development organization set up by the unions in 1951.

The cooperatives followed strict Rochdale Principles, with one vote per member, irrespective of the nominal value of his shares. Resale of shares was restricted; members moving out of the apartments had to sell their shares back to the cooperative at the buying price, minus a flip tax. After the original financing structures governing the apartments were phased out, beginning in 1986, the shareholders of each cooperative decided, in separate votes in 1997 and 2000, to abandon the limited equity rules and free the resale of shares, in some cases increasing the value of apartments fivefold. To keep the maintenance fees low for original tenants, many of them retirees, a high flip tax is charged, up to 25% of the gross sales price for "first sales" and up to 15% for "second sales". In a similar instance, the shareholders at the Penn South sister cooperative in the Chelsea section of Manhattan voted to continue operating under limited equity rules.

== Amalgamated Dwellings ==
The Amalgamated Dwellings, one of the oldest housing cooperatives in the United States, was the second cooperative sponsored by the Amalgamated Clothing Workers of America, after the successful Amalgamated Cooperative Apartments in the Bronx. The six-story Art Deco building with 236 apartments was designed by the architects Springsteen & Goldhammer and was completed in 1930 at the site of a former printing plant. The building covered one city block, with a protected garden in the center. The design was intended to provide direct sunlight to all rooms, something that was missing from the typical Manhattan tenements. The cooperative also had a library, an auditorium, a nursery, and a gym. The apartments were priced at $500 a room, with monthly maintenance fees, including repayment of the mortgage, at $12.50 a room.

== Hillman Housing Corporation ==
The Hillman Housing Corporation was the third cooperative sponsored by the Amalgamated Clothing Workers. The cooperative, located on Grand Street between Kazan Plaza and Lewis Street on two sides of the Amalgamated Dwellings buildings, consists of three twelve-story buildings with 807 units. A garden links Hillman Houses to each other and to the Amalgamated Dwellings.

Construction was begun in November 1947 and was completed by 1950 at a total cost of $9.1 million. The design is attributed to Springsteen & Goldhammer, with Herman J. Jessor responsible for much of the work. Four slum blocks with 65 tenement buildings were torn down to clear the site for the development. As banks were unwilling to provide loans to the cooperative, financing was provided by the Mutual Life Insurance Company.

The cooperative is named after Sidney Hillman, founder and first president of the Amalgamated Clothing Workers of America. Each of the three Hillman houses is named after a cooperative or labor leader:

- Edward A. Filene, father of the credit union movement
- Meyer London, socialist member of the 64th United States Congress
- Louis D. Brandeis, U.S. Supreme Court Justice

== East River Housing Corporation ==
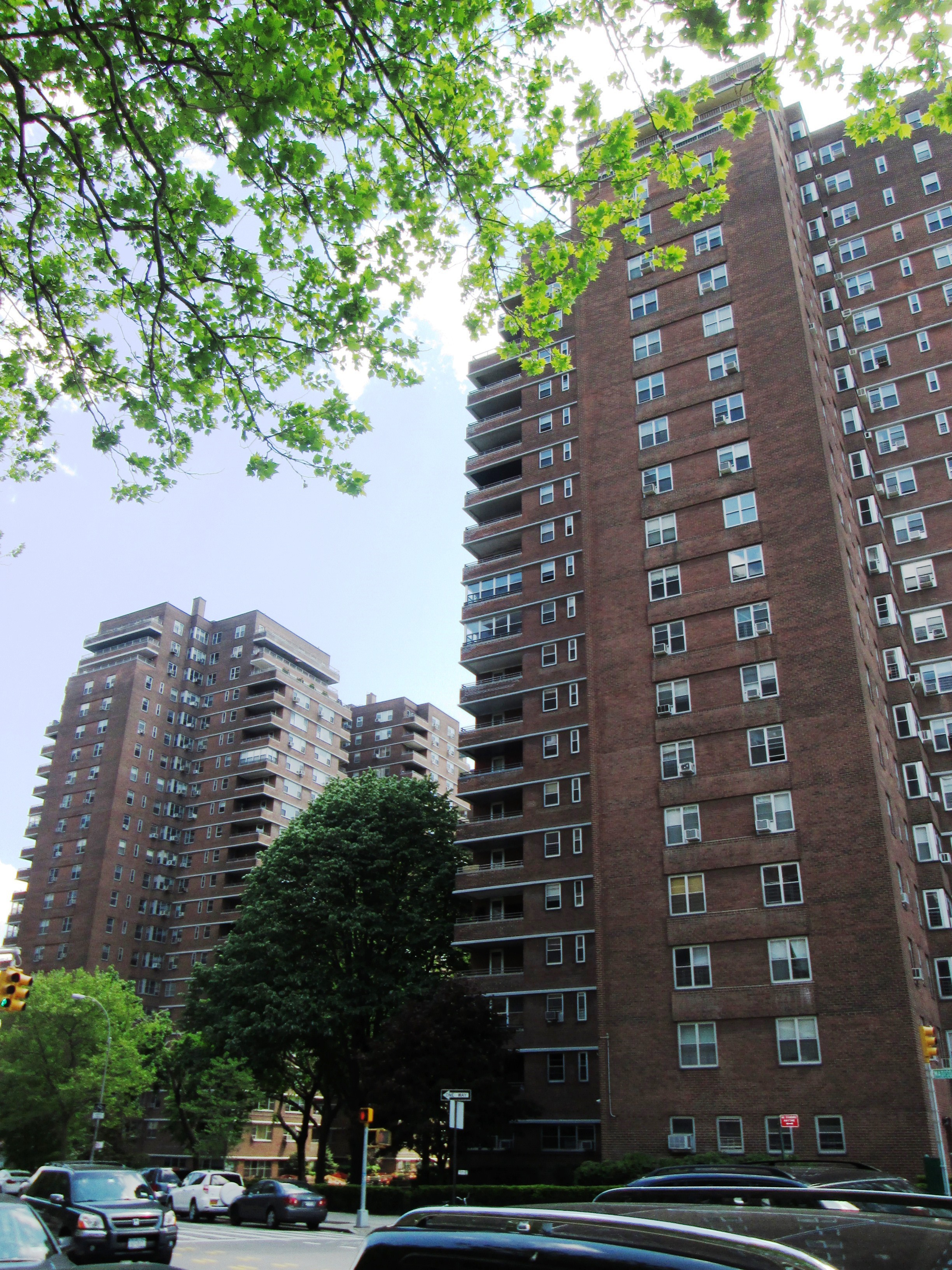
Towers of the East River Housing Corporation

The East River Housing Corporation was one of the first developments of the newly formed United Housing Foundation and was financially sponsored by the International Ladies' Garment Workers' Union. A mortgage loan was insured by the Federal Housing and Home Finance Agency. Construction work was begun in November 1953 and completed in 1956. The cooperative has 1,672 apartments in four 20- and 21-story towers on an open lot facing the East River.

The project was designed by George W. Springsteen and his new associate, Herman J. Jessor, who would go on to design many other UHF projects, including Co-op City. The buildings followed the "towers in a park" concept introduced to the U.S. in the late 1930s by the Castle Village towers in Hudson Heights in upper Manhattan. The Castle Village layout, with cross-shaped towers placed diagonally to the cardinal directions optimized to give each apartment a maximum view, was used by most post-war social and affordable housing in New York City. Springsteen's derivation, used already at Hillman Houses, connects three of these towers side by side. The East River towers also share the reinforced concrete construction and red brick facade with Castle Village. At the time of construction the 21-story towers were the highest reinforced concrete buildings in the U.S.

Each of the four East River houses is named after a labor leader:

- Morris Hillquit, a co-founder of the Socialist Party of America
- Morris Sigman, president of the International Ladies' Garment Workers' Union (ILGWU)
- The Erlich-Alter Building, named after Henryk Erlich and Victor Alter, leaders of the Polish Bund
- Benjamin Schlesinger, three-time president of the ILGWU

== Seward Park Housing Corporation ==
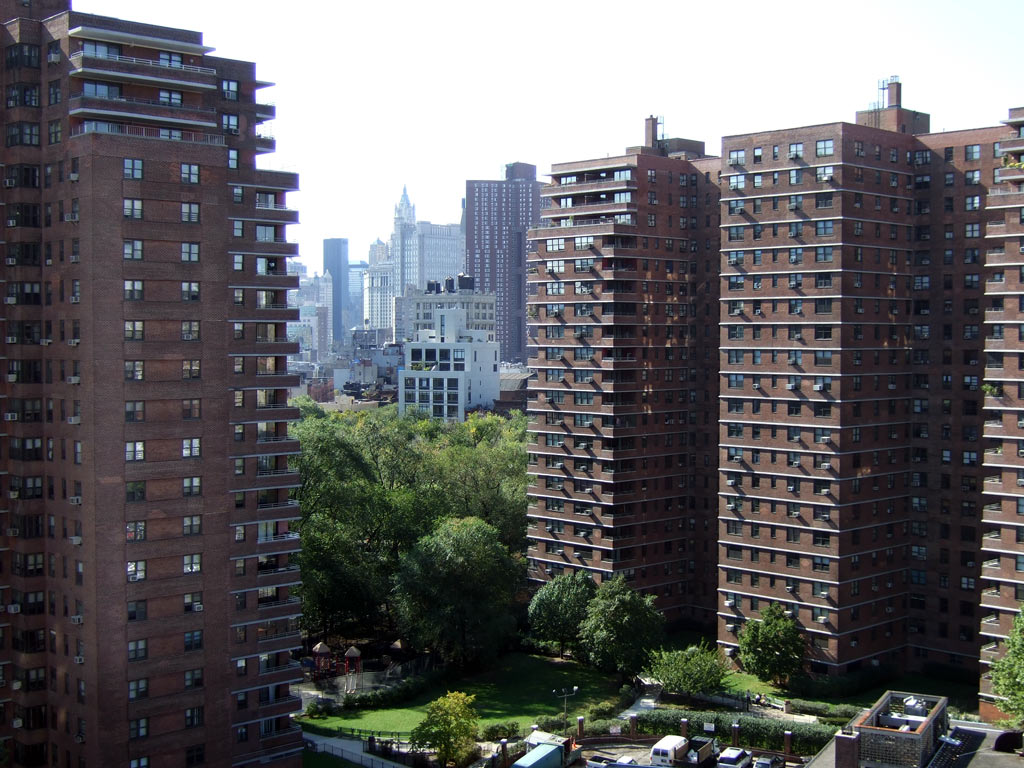
A view southwest through the Seward Park towers

Seward Park Housing Corporation is located in the triangle between Grand Street and East Broadway, and abuts the New York City public park that shares its name. The buildings, designed by Herman Jessor, share the general design of the East River Houses, with four towers facing the Lower East Side. Each of the twelve semi-attached towers has seven or eight apartments on each floor around a central stairwell and corridor.

Construction work was begun in 1957 and finished in 1959 at a total cost of $23,258,392.75. A mortgage loan from Bowery Savings Bank and pension funds of the United Hatters, Cap & Millinery Workers, International Union as well as Brotherhood of Painters, Decorators and Paperhangers of America covered $18 million, with about 25% of the costs paid as equity by the 1,728 cooperative members.

In January 1999, in the wake of a collapse in the parking garage, New York City building inspectors suspected there could be a potential flaw in Jessor's "honeycomb" design of the massive garage roof. The roof had been built to support a vast playground/park above, with trees and grass upon hundreds of thousands of pounds of soil. After the collapse on Friday night, January 15, 1999, the New York City Department of Buildings opened an investigation into other Jessor projects to test for durability. The investigation did not turn up any major design flaws, and cited convergence of many elements including several days of warm rain, followed by quick freezing, thawing, and refreezing, along with a stoppage in the drainage system combined with minor cracking of the concrete in the roof and the immense weight above. After a four-year lawsuit, the Greater New York Insurance Company, insurer for Seward Park Housing, lost their nonpayment case to the cooperative, and $18 million for the damages. After the insurer won a subsequent appeal, the insurer and coop settled in 2010 with the coop returning $3.25 million to the insurer.

The buildings are known for their murals by Hugo Gellert in a socialist realist style. Each of the murals depicts a "progressive" hero with an associated quote:

- Thomas Jefferson: "We hold these truths to be self-evident, that all men are created equal, that they are endowed by their Creator with certain unalienable Rights, that among these are Life, Liberty and the pursuit of Happiness." (Declaration of Independence)
- Abraham Lincoln: "In giving freedom to the slave, we assure freedom to the free." (1862 Annual Message to Congress)
- Franklin D. Roosevelt: "Freedom of Speech • Freedom to Worship • Freedom from Want • Freedom from Fear" (1941 State of the Union Address)
- Albert Einstein: "A new type of thinking is essential if mankind is to survive and move towards higher levels." (1946 telegram on behalf of the Emergency Committee of Atomic Scientists)

== In popular culture ==
Frances Madeson's 2007 comic novel Cooperative Village is set in the co-operative.

== See also ==
- Amalgamated Housing Cooperative
- Co-op City, Bronx
- Essex Crossing
- LeFrak City
- Mitchell Lama
- Parkchester, Bronx
- Parkfairfax, Virginia
- Parkmerced, San Francisco
- Park La Brea, Los Angeles
- Penn South
- Riverton Houses
- Rochdale Village, Queens
- Southbridge Towers
- Starrett City, Brooklyn
- Stuyvesant Town–Peter Cooper Village
