= Herman Jessor =

American architect

Herman J. Jessor
- Born: June 15, 1894; Russian Empire
- Died: April 8, 1990 (aged 95); Manhattan, New York City, U.S.
- Education: Cooper Union
- Occupation: Architect
- Spouse: Eva Jaffee

Herman J. Jessor (June 15, 1894 – April 8, 1990) was an American architect who helped build more than 40,000 units of cooperative housing in New York City. He, along with Abraham Kazan, was a driving force of the cooperative housing movement in the United States.

== Biography ==
Jessor was born in the Russian Empire. He arrived with his family in the United States at age 12, and graduated from Stuyvesant High School in Manhattan, and then the Cooper Union School of Engineering. During school, he worked as an engineer.

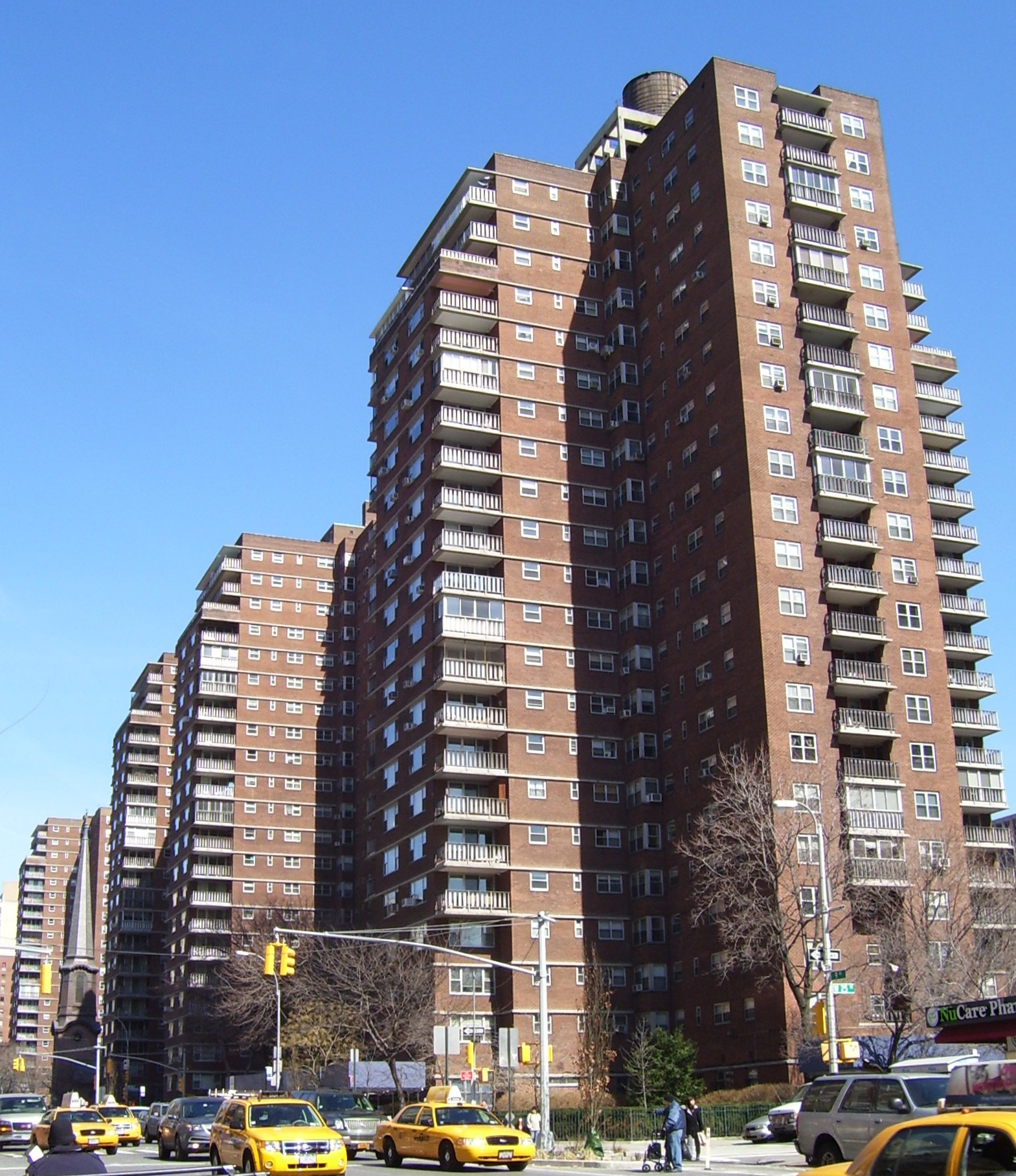
Penn South by Jessor

He was a young architect on the staff of architect George W. Springsteen, of Springsteen & Goldhammer, when that firm engineered the first limited-equity cooperative in New York City, the Amalgamated Housing Cooperative in The Bronx, in 1927. Jessor subsequently worked with Springsteen on the design on the Hillman Housing Corporation and was the architect for phase two of the United Workers Cooperative Colony; East River Housing Corporation [possibly with Springsteen again, depending on the source], Seward Park Housing Corporation; Rochdale Village in Queens and the Penn South complex in Chelsea, Manhattan. In one of his largest undertakings, Jessor was the major designer of Co-op City, the 15,500-unit cooperative development in The Bronx.

Jessor was married to the former Eva Jaffee. He died in Manhattan on April 8, 1990.

== Career ==
Jessor became known for ensuring working-class families had proper social amenities in their daily lives. He included entrance foyers, eat-in kitchens with windows, and bedrooms with cross-ventilation, so working-class families without air-conditioning could benefit from natural breezes. At the time Jessor was an architect, air-conditioning was especially expensive. He eschewed the typical railroad flat design, which required walking through one room to get to the next, favoring a design where rooms were accessed from a common hallway, providing more privacy to the residents.

Jessor was a close ally of such labor unions as the Amalgamated Clothing Workers Union, the International Ladies Garment Workers Union, and the International Brotherhood of Electrical Workers. Many of the buildings he worked on were funded with the help of these unions.

In January 1999, in the wake of a collapse in the Seward Park Housing parking garage, New York City building inspectors suspected there could be a potential flaw in Jessor's "honeycomb" design of the massive garage roof. The roof had been built to support a vast playground/park above, with trees and grass upon hundreds of thousands of pounds of soil. After the collapse on Friday night, January 15, 1999, the New York City Department of Buildings opened an investigation into other Jessor projects to test for durability. The investigation did not turn up any major design flaws, and cited convergence of many elements including several days of warm rain, followed by quick freezing, thawing, and refreezing, along with a stoppage in the drainage system combined with minor cracking of the concrete in the roof and the immense weight above. After a four-year lawsuit, the Greater New York Insurance Company, insurer for Seward Park Housing, lost their nonpayment case to the cooperative, and $18 million for the damages. After the insurer won a subsequent appeal, the insurer and coop settled in 2010 with the coop returning $3.25 million to the insurer.

== See also ==
- List of New York City housing cooperatives
