= Lawrence Gellert =

Lawrence Gellert (1898-1979?), was a music collector, who in the 1920s and 1930s amassed a significant collection of field-recorded African-American blues and spirituals and also claimed to have documented black protest traditions in the South of the United States.

== Background ==
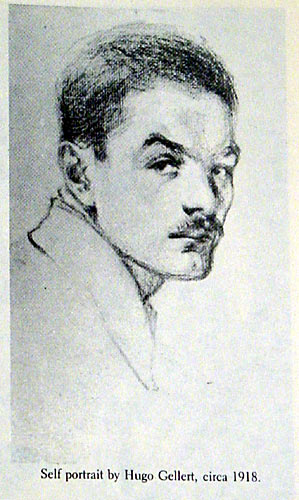
Lawrence Gellert's brother was artist Hugo Gellert, here in a self-portrait (circa 1918)

Lawrence Gellert was born László Grünbaum on September 14, 1898, in Budapest, Hungary. He came to America at the age of seven and grew up in New York City. His mother was Katica Schwartz, while his father was Ábrahám Grünbaum, was a skilled craftsman (tailor) by trade. Both parents were ethnically Jewish, but Lawrence's mother had converted to Catholicism while in Hungary and remained devoutly Christian all her life. The Grünbaum family had left Hungary in part to keep their five sons from being drafted into the Austro-Hungarian army. Lawrence's oldest brother, Hugo Gellert, was accepted into Cooper Union as an art student, won a scholarship to study in Paris, and was soon doing illustrations for The New York Times and later, The New Yorker. When Hugo adopted the surname "Gellert" after a Hungarian Catholic saint who had championed the poor, the family followed suit. When the United States entered World War I, another brother, Ernest (a pacifist and conscientious objector) received a 10-years sentence to a military prison in New Jersey. One morning in March 1918, Ernest was found dead in his cell of a gunshot wound to the head. This was a hugely traumatic event for the family, who were certain Ernest had been tormented and then murdered by the guards. The newspapers reported Ernest's death as a suicide. Hugo Gellert, an impassioned anti-militarist, had fled to Mexico for the duration of the war.

== Career ==
Lawrence Gellert's education was spotty and he dropped out of high school after attending briefly. During the 1920s he found work on a newspaper but was stricken with lung and rib infections and possibly also suffered a mental breakdown. On the advice of his doctors, he maintained, he moved around 1924 to Tryon, North Carolina, in an attempt to recover his health, having originally intended to go to Florida. In Tryon he found friends, joined an amateur theater group, and at some point began writing down the words of African American spirituals and then making audio recording of them, using at first a makeshift, wind-up recording machine and paper-backed zinc discs (now inaudible), and, after 1930, a Presto disc recorder. Gellert's biographer, Bruce Conforth, relates that contrary to what has been written elsewhere, Gellert, who was fascinated with the striking beauty, especially, of African American religious music, was "very slow" to become interested in issues of racial justice and equality and was only pushed into it by his brother Hugo.

=== Folk song collecting ===
From 1933 to 1937 Gellert was back in New York City but made short trips through North Carolina, South Carolina, and Georgia, collecting folksongs of black Americans. At one point, Gellert's automobile was "allegedly known as 'Larry's Nigger Hoo Doo Shack on Wheels'."

Throughout the 1930s Lawrence frequently contributed to the magazine the Masses (later the New Masses), where his brother Hugo was on the editorial staff. Several of his columns appeared under the title "Negro Protest Songs", illustrated by Hugo with pictures of lynchings. These were published in book form under the titles Negro Songs of Protest (1936) and Me and My Captain (1939). Steven Garabedian has described the press reception of Negro Songs of Protest this way:

In a short profile in 1936, Time magazine applauded the "lean, scraggly-haired New Yorker" for his skill in "collecting Negro songs that few white men have ever heard." His collection, determined the New York Times, unearthed a "new genre" of black music dealing with "the realities of Negro life." The left-wing press was even more enthusiastic. The Communist Party newspaper Daily Worker called the release of Negro Songs of Protest a "landmark in American culture." Composer Lan Adomian, in New Masses, wrote that the book featured "some of the finest examples in Negro folk music" of the day. The material, he concluded, represented an "indictment" against long-standing white ignorance and denial, a stark rebuke to "the slander that a nation of thirteen million people, reduced to peonage, is nothing more than a grand minstrel show."

Selections from Gellert's recordings were released in 1973 and 1982 by Rounder Records as vinyl LPs and 1984 on Heritage Records (HT-304). In the 1990s these were reissued on two CDs by Document Records, edited by University of Michigan folklorist and ethnomusicologist Bruce Conforth. In 2008, Conforth published his long-awaited biography, African American Folksong and American Cultural Politics: The Lawrence Gellert Story (2013).

=== Fabrication of Protest Songs ===
During his lifetime, Gellert was suspected by other folklorists and colleagues of doctoring or even of having fabricated the songs he presented as "Negro protest songs", since they were unable to find parallels anywhere. Gellert also refused to share any information on the identity of the singers he recorded nor the dates on which he collected this material, ostensibly to protect the singers from reprisal.

Conforth concludes that Gellert (or someone connected to the New Masses) did indeed fabricate the protest songs. This was done to lend distinction to Gellert's material, which was otherwise indistinguishable from the repertoire collected by other researchers, the difference being only in the manner in which Gellert's material was packaged.

Moreover, Gellert falsified much else about his life, such as that he had witnessed a lynching and had lived with a black woman. Conforth explains that, in his opinion, Gellert, a weak and dependent character, who since his twenties had been a chronic invalid and then an alcoholic, was manipulated into doing this by the "Left" (who included his brother Hugo and New Masses editor, Mike Gold). Cornforth believes that Lawrence was also motivated by a desire to increase his standing in the eyes of his surviving brothers: Hugo, the famous artist, and also Otto and Theodore (Ted) Gellert, who together owned a prosperous import-export business and who financed Lawrence's recording ventures. As described by Conforth, in fact, Gellert was an inveterate fabulist whose stories about himself and how he made his recordings are completely unreliable.

Conforth believes that Gellert's large collection, which comprises predominantly blues and devotional songs, is of great historical importance nevertheless. According to Conforth, Gellert had no interest in politics himself. Nor was he interested in white folk music, which he despised. A strikingly handsome man, who was, especially when young, very attractive to women, Gellert had originally wanted to become a Broadway actor.

== Death ==
In old age, Gellert, who lived in downtown New York City, became known as an eccentric Greenwich Village character. In 1979, at the age of 80, he disappeared after reportedly having become a "person of interest" (or believing that he was) in the disappearance of Etan Patz, a notorious kidnapping-murder case, since the Patzes lived nearby. Conforth interviewed Lawrence's older brothers, who had supported Lawrence financially all his life, and came away believing the family had somehow spirited him away to protect his fragile mental health from the stress of being linked to the case.

== See also ==
- Hugo Gellert
