= United Housing Foundation =

Real estate investment trust in New York, United States

The United Housing Foundation (UHF) was a real estate investment trust in New York that constructed numerous cooperative housing projects, including Rochdale Village in Queens and Co-op City in the Bronx.

The UHF ran into major issues with the Co-op city rent strikes of 1975-1976. Control over Co-op city was turned over to residents and the UHF never built again.

== Purpose ==
In 1951, the United Housing Foundation (UHF) was organized to provide broader sponsorship for cooperative housing formalizing the success of Abraham Kazan and his associates. By 1965 UHF and its predecessors had created some 23 cooperative housing projects in New York City, ranging in size from the 124-unit Mutual Housing Association in the Bronx to Rochdale Village in Queens, with 5,860 apartments and also its own food stores, nursery schools, a credit union, and a multitude of civic and social organizations, to make it an integrated and well-rounded community. The primary architect who designed the buildings with Kazan was Herman Jessor.

The United Housing Foundation worked primarily in New York City and New York State, using financing from savings banks, insurance companies union pension funds and other conventional sources and also direct mortgage loans from the State of New York. The UHF emphasis was on high-rise, large-scale projects to meet a mass need for lower priced housing in New York.

With the support of the Mayor of New York City and Governor of New York State, UHF developed Co-op City which now houses over 15,000 families, or about 40,000 people. UHF built schools for the project and turned them over to the Board of Education of New York City for operation. In addition, the community has three shopping centers with co-op supermarkets, branches of New York City banks and specialty shops and service stores necessary for service of this size community.

== Other resources ==
Records relating to the United Housing Foundation are on deposit at the Kheel Center for Labor-Management Documentation Center, Cornell University.

== See also ==
- List of New York City housing cooperatives
- Cooperative Village
- Amalgamated Clothing Workers of America
- International Ladies' Garment Workers' Union
- Penn South
