= Van Cortlandt Village =

Neighborhood in New York City

- Neighborhood of the Bronx
- Location in New York City
- Coordinates: 40.884°N 73.894°W
- Country: United States
- State: New York
- City: New York City
- Borough: Bronx
- Community District: The Bronx 8

Area
  - Total: 0.862 sq mi (2.23 km^{2})

Population (2010)
  - Total: 50,100
  - Density: 58,100/sq mi (22,400/km^{2})

Economics
  - Median income: $49,126

Ethnicity
  - Hispanic: 64.5%
  - Black: 17.0%
  - White: 12.1%
  - Asian: 4.8%
  - Others: 1.7%
- ZIP Codes: 10463
- Area code: 718, 347, 929, and 917
- Website: www.vancortlandtvillage.nyc

Van Cortlandt Village is a subsection of the Kingsbridge neighborhood in the New York City borough of the Bronx. The neighborhood is part of Bronx Community Board 8. Named after Van Cortlandt Park, it is bordered by the Major Deegan Expressway to the west, the Jerome Park Reservoir to the east, West 238th Street to the south, and Van Cortlandt Park to the north. Its ZIP Code is 10463.

== History ==
The arrival of the elevated IRT Broadway–Seventh Avenue Line subway line around the turn of the 20th century brought an influx of immigrants to Kingsbridge Heights, including the section of the neighborhood that would eventually become known as Van Cortlandt Village.

The still-thriving Amalgamated Housing Cooperative, because of its distinctive culture and high population density, came to define its corner of Kingsbridge Heights as a distinct area, according to Lloyd Ultan, the Bronx Borough Historian. In 1975, a member of the local community board proposed that the Amalgamated and its surroundings be renamed, and a sign was unveiled designating the area Van Cortlandt Village.

=== Naming for preservation ===
The Historic Districts Council in early January 2012 recognized Van Cortlandt Village as a New York City neighborhood in need of preservation. In Van Cortlandt Village, the Fort Independence Park Neighborhood Association has been fighting a handful of land grabs and new housing projects. The community sits atop the ruins of a Revolutionary War fort and was designed by legendary landscape architect Frederick Law Olmsted. It boasts small Tudor Revival homes and during the 1920s became a mecca for socialist factory workers fleeing the tenements of the lower East Side to build cooperative housing. As of 2015 some former co-ops such as the Shalom Aleichem Houses had fallen on hard times and the character of the neighborhood was threatened by overdevelopment, so HDC committed to help FIPNA get it listed on the national historic register, according to Kristin Hart, president of the community group.

Originally the "Yiddish Cooperative Heimgesellschaft", the historic Shalom Aleichem Houses cooperative housing project was started by socialist Yiddish members of the Socialist and Communist Parties. Construction on the 15-building Neo-Tudor fortress-like structure culminated in 1927. As of 2014 the multi-ethnic rental complex is located in what is considered to be the heart of the Van Cortlandt Village community. As part of the Office of the Bronx Borough President's Bronx 2008 historic preservation project, the Shalom Aleichem Co-operative complex was being reviewed for landmark status.

The community, eventually named for legendary Yiddish author Sholem Aleichem, was founded as one of the country's first housing cooperatives. It failed during the Great Depression and became a rental complex. In the spring of 2013 it was acquired by an owner to restore it to its original grandeur and the complex was renamed the Shalom Aleichem Houses.

== Demographics ==
Based on data from the 2010 United States census, the population of Van Cortlandt Village was 50,100, a decrease of 507 (1.0%) from the 50,607 counted in 2000. Covering an area of 506.77 acres (205.08 ha), the neighborhood had a population density of 98.9 inhabitants per acre (63,300/sq mi; 24,400/km^{2}).

The racial makeup of the neighborhood was 12.1% (6,087) White, 17.0% (8,498) African American, 0.2% (93) Native American, 4.8% (2,386) Asian, 0.0% (7) Pacific Islander, 0.5% (259) from other races, and 1.0% (479) from two or more races. Hispanic or Latino of any race were 64.5% (32,291) of the population.

== Land use and terrain ==
Van Cortlandt Village has traditionally been classified as part of Kingsbridge, and in particular, as part of the northern section of Kingsbridge Heights. The 0.5 square miles (1.3 km^{2}) neighborhood is generally thought to extend from its namesake Van Cortlandt Park on the north, to Dickinson and Sedgwick Avenues on the east, to Bailey Avenue on the west and Albany Crescent on the south.

=== Residential ===
Van Cortlandt Village is a mostly low density residential neighborhood.

On September 28, 2004, the New York City Department of City Planning approved the rezoning all or portions of 15 blocks in this northwestern Bronx neighborhood (bounded by Van Cortlandt Park South to the north, Fort Independence Park and Sedgwick Avenue to the east, West 231st Street and Albany Crescent to the south, and by Heath Avenue, Fort Independence Street and Orloff Avenue to the west) into Van Cortlandt Village, which is located within Community District 8. The zoning changes aimed to preserve the community's low-rise/low-density character by ensuring that new development is compatible in scale, both with the one- and two-family detached homes that prevail in parts of the neighborhood and with the more diverse housing stock in others. The area is predominantly low-density residential, with a significant number of one- and two-family detached and semi-detached houses. Even the multifamily apartment buildings in the area are seldom taller than 70 feet (21 m).

Its housing stock is diverse, including spacious single-family homes, multiple-family attached homes and postwar co-op buildings. The New York Times describes the area as a "serene enclave of quaint homes, winding streets and abundant trees." The area is described by Anthony Perez Cassino, a former chairman of Bronx Community Board 8 who helped to rezone the neighborhood, as a "vulnerable" area, as it is more affordable than nearby Riverdale. A garland of greenery wends through the neighborhood. In the heart of the area, on twisting hilly streets like Giles Place and Cannon Place, are elegant brick homes with porticos and manicured hedges. Along the broader avenues are handsome co-op buildings, capped on the northern end by the Amalgamated Cooperative Houses, one of the city's historically significant co-op complexes. With nearly 1,500 units in 11 buildings, the complex was founded in 1927 by leaders of the Amalgamated Clothing Workers Union, who fashioned it as a sort of proletarian paradise. While some of the descendants of the mostly Jewish immigrants who made up the Amalgamated's original tenants remain, a more diverse collection of residents carry on its legacy, with communal enterprises like children's play groups and art classes.

As elsewhere in the city, street parking is scarce and some co-ops have resident parking lots.

=== Commercial ===
Shopping in the neighborhood is limited to a small but serviceable collection of retailers at the northern end of Sedgwick Avenue. Shopping was traditionally also available along Jerome Avenue and Broadway.

Close nearby, to the west and southwest of Van Cortlandt Village, two new large commercial shopping malls were constructed and opened in 2014. The first to open in July 2014 is Riverdale Crossing located at West 237th Street and Broadway, and the second one, opened in fall 2014, is the Broadway Plaza mall located at West 230th Street/Kimberly Place and Broadway.

=== Parks ===
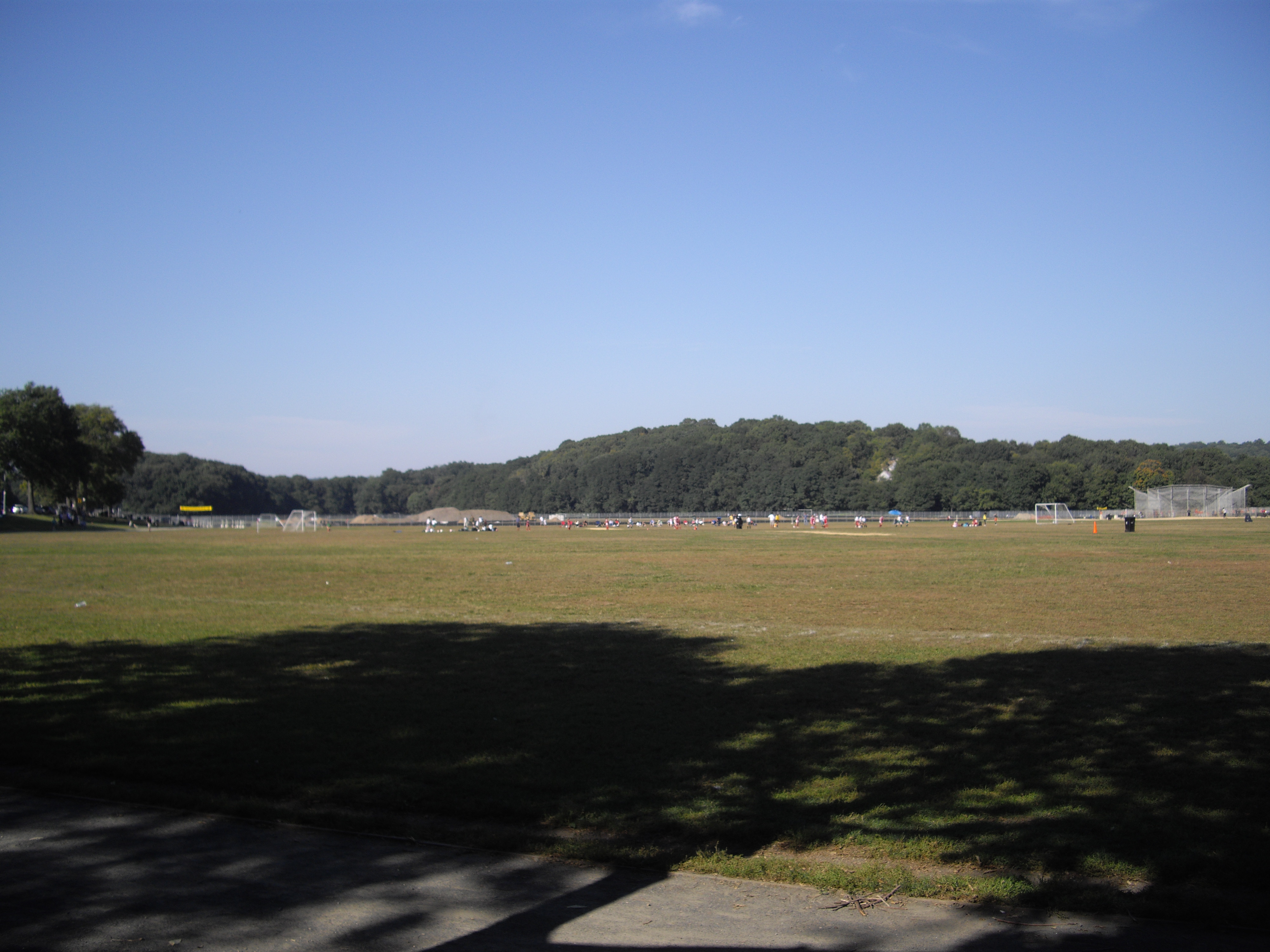
Van Cortlandt Park

The neighborhood abuts Van Cortlandt Park, a 1,110-acre (4.5 km^{2}) swath of forest with various trails and recreational fields. It is the city's fourth-largest park and includes the Van Cortlandt Golf Course. Stretching along part of Sedgwick Avenue is Fort Independence Park, a popular neighborhood spot with handball courts, a basketball court and a playground.

The Jerome Park Reservoir offers a 2.5-mile (4.0 km) walking-jogging scenic pathway.

== Social and civic groups ==
The Amalgamated Co-op offers various social activities: ceramics classes, writers' workshops and art exhibits. Many of the Bronx's cultural amenities are a short distance away, including the New York Botanical Garden and Wave Hill.

The Van Cortlandt Jewish & Senior Centers (JASA) are also located on Sedgwick Avenue.

== Police and crime ==
Van Cortlandt Village is patrolled by the 50th Precinct of the NYPD, located at 3450 Kingsbridge Avenue. The 50th Precinct ranked 13th safest out of 69 patrol areas for per-capita crime in 2010.

The 50th Precinct has a lower crime rate than in the 1990s, with crimes across all categories having decreased by 69.9% between 1990 and 2022. The precinct reported three murders, 22 rapes, 185 robberies, 213 felony assaults, 126 burglaries, 695 grand larcenies, and 288 grand larcenies auto in 2022.

== Fire safety ==
Van Cortlandt Village contains a New York City Fire Department (FDNY) fire station, Engine Co. 81/Ladder Co. 46, at 3025 Bailey Avenue.

== Education ==
=== Schools ===
PS 95 on Hillman Avenue serves grades K-8. The Am Park Neighborhood School serves grades PK-5.

The Bronx High School of Science (75 West 205th Street) is about 0.5 miles (0.80 km) from Van Cortlandt Village. DeWitt Clinton High School, is also located nearby on West Mosholu Parkway.

There are various parochial and private schools in the area, including the Ethical Culture Fieldston School, Horace Mann School, Riverdale Country School and SAR Academy in Riverdale.

Manhattan University, a small institution of higher education, is located nearby. Lehman College, a senior college that is part of the City University of New York (CUNY), is directly across the Jerome Park Reservoir.

=== Library ===
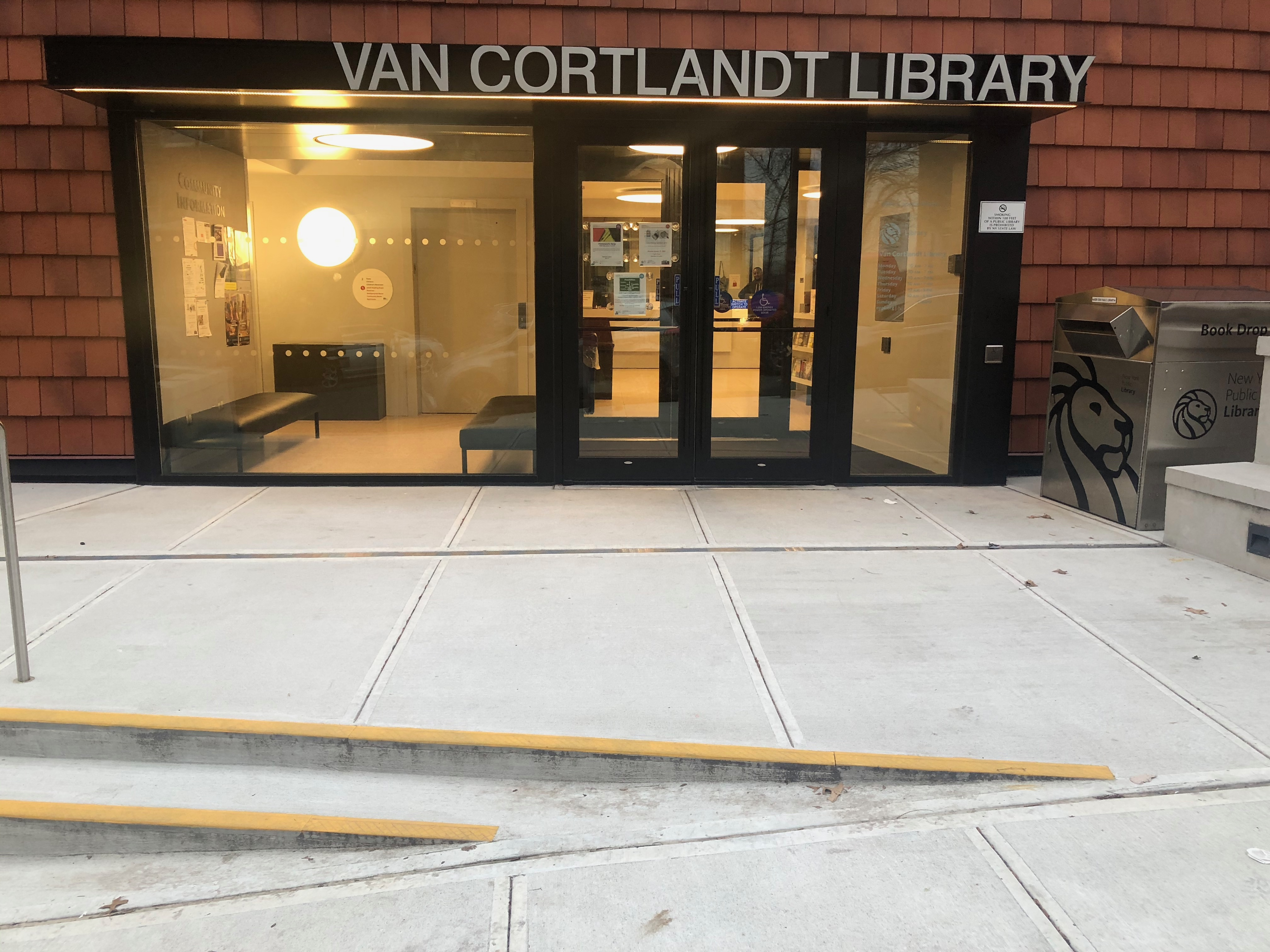
Van Cortlandt Library

The New York Public Library (NYPL) operates the Van Cortlandt branch at 3882 Cannon Place. The two-story, 5,800-square-foot (540 m^{2}) branch opened in 2019, replacing a smaller one-story branch a few blocks away, which opened in 1969 and consisted of a single room.

== Transportation ==
There are no New York City Subway stations in the neighborhood. The nearest subway stations are the 1 train, which serve 242nd Street, 238th Street, and 231st Street on the IRT Broadway–Seventh Avenue Line. Other stations include Mosholu Parkway and Bedford Park Boulevard–Lehman College, serving the 4 train on the IRT Jerome Avenue Line, and Bedford Park Boulevard, serving the B and D trains on the IND Concourse Line.

The following MTA Regional Bus Operations bus routes serve Van Cortlandt Village:

- Bx1: to Riverdale or Third Avenue – 138th Street station (via Grand Concourse)
- Bx2: to Kingsbridge Heights or Third Avenue – 138th Street station (via Grand Concourse)
- Bx3: to Kingsbridge Heights or Columbia University Medical Center in Washington Heights, Manhattan
- Bx10: to Riverdale or Norwood – 205th Street (via Kappock Street and West 231st Street)
- BxM3: to Yonkers or Madison Square Park

The nearby Major Deegan Expressway (Interstate 87) and Henry Hudson Parkway offer a relatively quick route to Upper Manhattan as well as to Bergen County, New Jersey via the George Washington Bridge. Mosholu Parkway leads to Southern Boulevard and the New York Botanical Garden. In addition, the nearby Saw Mill Parkway also offers local access to places in Westchester.
