= Holy Apostles Soup Kitchen =

Soup kitchen in Manhattan, New York City

Holy Apostles Soup Kitchen (HASK) is an emergency feeding program of the Church of the Holy Apostles, located in the Chelsea section of Manhattan. HASK provides hot meals as well as counseling and referrals services citizens of New York City.

== Mission ==
Holy Apostles Soup Kitchen offers food and counsel to the homeless. HASK also advocates on behalf of the hungry and homeless so that their voices are heard.

== History ==
The Soup Kitchen opened on October 22, 1982, as part of the outreach program of the Church of the Holy Apostles, founded in 1844 and designated a NYC Landmark in 1966. HASK is the largest feeding program in the Episcopal Church.

On its first day in 1982, HASK served 35 local homeless individuals camped out across the street from the church. HASK quickly grew in a matter of weeks to 300, and four years later it was serving more than 800 meals each weekday. On September 28, 1988, the Soup Kitchen served its one-millionth meal.

A fire gutted the roof and much of the interior of the church nave in 1990, the Soup Kitchen served 943 meals the next day. HASK has not missed a single serving day since its inception. Vastly improved accommodations made after the fire allow the hungry individuals coming for hot meals to eat in the nave of the church itself.

By 2007, its 25th anniversary, the soup kitchen had served more than 6 million meals. As of 2010, HASK has served over 6.8 million meals and serves currently on average over 1,200 meals each weekday (including holidays).

== Services ==
Holy Apostles Soup Kitchen provides meals Monday through Friday from 10:30 a.m. to 12:30 p.m. The Soup Kitchen operates counseling and referrals services which help with other essential and basic needs by giving information as well as referrals to other organizations. About two dozen participants, recruited primarily from the Soup Kitchen line, enroll each spring.

== Recognition ==
HASK was honored with:

- A proclamation from the Office of the Mayor of New York City in commemoration of its 20th anniversary.
- Proclamations from the City Council of New York, the Office of the Mayor, and a letter of commendation from the Office of the Governor of New York State in commemoration of its 25th anniversary.
- A proclamation from the Office of the Borough President in 2006.
- A proclamation in 1999 from The Episcopal Diocese of New York, presenting HASK its Award for Exemplary Program.

== Visitors ==
Holy Apostles Soup Kitchen has drawn visitors throughout the years.

- New York City Mayor Michael R. Bloomberg
- New York City Public Advocate Betsy Gotbaum
- United States Senator from New York Chuck Schumer
- US Congressman from New York Anthony Weiner
- New York State Senator Tom Duane
- Susan Sarandon
- United States Senator Jeff Sessions
