= Abraham E. Kazan =

American activist

Abraham Eli Kazan
- Born: 1889
- Died: December 21, 1971 (aged 82); New York City, U.S.
- Occupation: Engineer

Abraham E. Kazan (1889–1971) is considered the "father of U.S. cooperative housing".

== Biography ==
Abraham Kazan was born in 1889. Growing up as an eyewitness to appalling tenement conditions, Kazan believed that housing was a vital obstacle for the average person. The problem, as he saw it, was more pronounced in urban settings. Large numbers of people lived within cities, either to be closer work or to be able to share space with multitudes of people who would help contribute to the monthly rent.

As a president of the credit union at the Amalgamated Clothing Workers of America union (A.C.W.U.), Kazan understood that most people, rich and poor, usually considered a home as “purely a product of his own efforts.” Yet, unlike all other routine necessities, owning a home required a sizable initial investment that was usually beyond that of those with moderate means or salaries. He felt that this made newly constructed buildings often out of reach for the poorer earners, causing harsher social and moral conditions with the tenement communities where the poorer people lived in tightly congested clusters.

Kazan did not believe that good housing conditions would guarantee normal, healthy people and families, but he was convinced that substandard housing does directly and adversely affect health, morale, and the social conditions of those who live there within it. Open spaces were important for healthy children, and he believed that lack of quality conditions would result in child delinquency, crime, disease and a host of other social and health crises that would fester.

To try to address this problem he developed the idea of cooperative housing—not merely to create a residential building or complex, but complete cooperative villages. The resulting communities had co-op shopping centers, with supermarkets, pharmacies, credit unions, optical centers and playgrounds.

He earned distinction for his work of integrating sections of New York City through affordable cooperative housing. Today, more than 100,000 people live in homes built by his efforts.

He took his cooperative idea even further and succeeded in federating the "Co-op Supermarkets" into a larger collective in order to give the markets competitive abilities to contend with the established chains. Kazan also inspired the building of co-op electric generating plants to bring down the price of power. Over the past two decades, most, if not all of the Co-op Supermarkets in New York City have been sold to the larger chains.

His life's work was recognized in many ways, as he became the first person in New York City's history to have a street named for him in his lifetime (the segment of Columbia Street between Grand and Delancey streets in Manhattan that ran through Cooperative Village).

== Kazan's Cooperatives ==
One of the first housing co-operative developments in the United States, started in 1927, was Amalgamated Housing in the Northwest Bronx. Kazan founded this development and was its President for 40 years, its Manager for thirty, and a resident. The Amalgamated, as it is known, is still a thriving co-operative community.

Among other developments Kazan was responsible for are his early projects, Amalgamated Dwellings, Hillman Housing, Seward Park Housing and East River Housing on the Lower East Side of Manhattan, known as Cooperative Village prior to its fragmentation. Later developments, under Kazan's United Housing Foundation (UHF), include the Penn South community in the Chelsea area of Manhattan, Warbasse Houses (Brooklyn), Rochdale Village (Queens), and Co-op City in the Bronx, the largest co-operative development of its kind.

== See also ==
- List of New York City housing cooperatives
