= Amalgamated Housing Cooperative =

Historic apartment community in New York City

Coordinates: 40.884732°N 73.891470°W

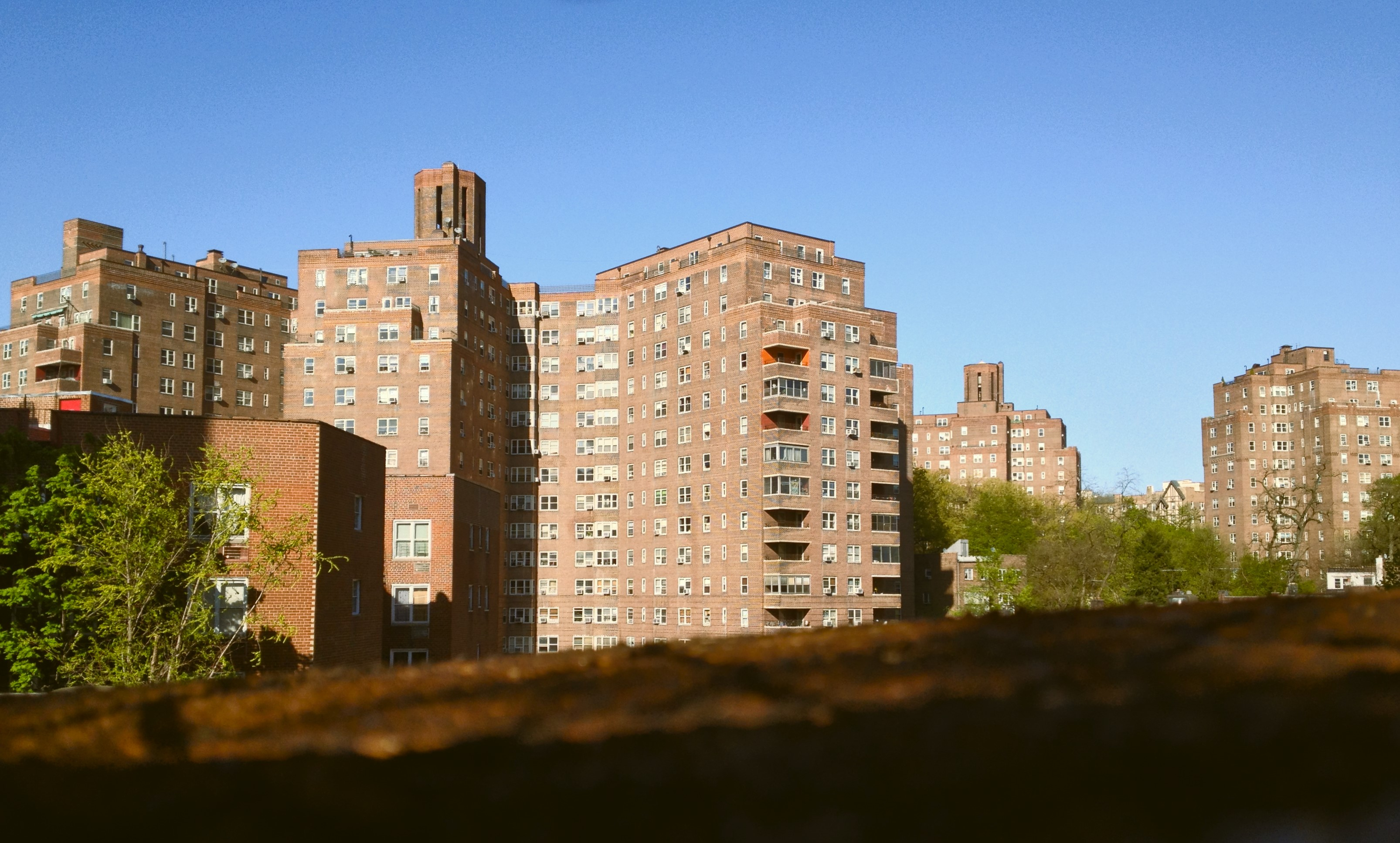
- A view of several larger buildings in the Amalgamated Coop, as seen from Orloff Avenue in 2013.

- Location within New York City

General information
- Location: 98 Van Cortlandt Park South, The Bronx, New York, NY 10463
- Construction started: 1927
- Completed: 1971

Design and construction
- Architect: Herman Jessor

Website
- https://www.amalgamated-bronx.coop

The Amalgamated Housing Corporation (known colloquially as The Amalgamated) is a limited-dividend housing business corp. in Van Cortlandt Village in the Bronx, New York City, not that far from Yankee Stadium. Organized in 1927 under 1926 State Housing Law for the Amalgamated Clothing Workers (ACW), a Manhattan-based socialist labor union, the housing company original flat-roofed building was erected at the southern edge of Van Cortlandt Park in 1927. Gradually, Tudor-style clusters were added (1927-32), now Building 10 (1941), and, in the post-World War II period, small flat-roofed one (1947), concrete high-rises (1949-51), and two towers replacing the original flat-roof in early 1970s.

The Amalgamated's delivery of attractive, affordable housing for working-class New Yorkers; its remarkable survival through the Great Depression; and its continued success and growth earned it praise from Franklin D. Roosevelt, among others. While it first served as a proof-of-concept for a self-help model of urban affordable housing, it later became a model for the much larger, state-sponsored limited-equity housing co-ops built in New York City during the post-World War II period. These included its sister co-op, Park Reservoir (the state's first Mitchell-Lama or limited-profit cooperative corp., with buildings on Sedgwick and Orloff Avenues); as well as Penn South in Manhattan, Rochdale Village in Queens, Co-op City in the Bronx, and others. Amid the decline and abandonment that plagued much of the West Bronx in the 1970s and 1980s, the Amalgamated remained an anchor of stability.

As of 2024, the Amalgamated comprised 11 residential buildings, with 1,468 units, ranging from studio to five-bedroom apartments. It forms the core of the Van Cortlandt Village section of the Bronx, situated between Van Cortlandt Park, to the north, and the Jerome Park Reservoir, to the south and east.

== History ==
The Amalgamated Co-op was the first housing complex in the United States founded under the first, limited-dividend law for limited equity housing (the other being later limited-profit law) that would ultimately be used to develop more than 40,000 units of affordable apartment units, in both owner-occupied, self-governed or for rent initially business corporations and then Mitchell-Lama co-ops (a vast majority) in Greater New York. The original buildings were designed by an architectural team that included Herman Jessor, who would go on to design the bulk of the New York City's housing cooperatives in the post-war era, in partnership with Abraham Kazan and (at times) with strong support from the controversial New York urban planning power broker, Robert Moses. It has been suggested that the scale of these later developments, and their state sponsorship, may have diluted the communitarian and self-governing characteristics that had contributed to the early success of the Amalgamated.

The Amalgamated, itself, grew from an original 303 units in its initial phase to a complex of 1,468 units, across 11 buildings, in 2022. The newest building, the second of two 20-story towers, was occupied in 1971. The Amalgamated's neighnoring co-op, Park Reservoir, located across three buildings in the blocks west of Jerome Park Reservoir, was New York's first Mitchell-Lama cooperative. As of 2024, it comprised an additional 273 units.

== Notable residents ==
- Daniel Libeskind – Architect.

== See also ==
- Amalgamated Clothing Workers of America
- Co-op City
- Cooperative Village
- Garden city movement (UK, US)
- Penn South
- Rochdale Principles
- Rochdale Village
- United Workers Cooperatives (Allerton Coops, Commie Coops)
