= Penn South =

Residential buildings in Manhattan, New York

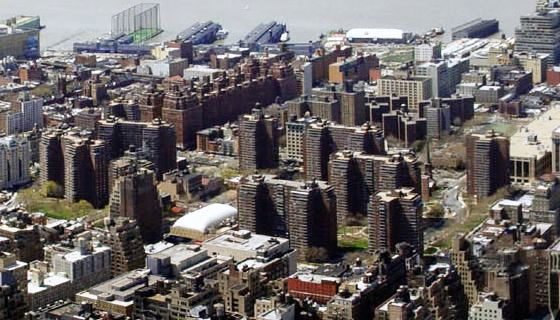
The Penn South cooperative as seen from the Empire State Building

Penn South, officially known as Mutual Redevelopment Houses and formerly Penn Station South, is a limited-equity housing cooperative development located between Eighth and Ninth Avenues and West 23rd and 29th Streets, in the Chelsea neighborhood of Manhattan in New York City. The complex has 2,820 units in ten 22-story buildings. Penn South is so named because of its location southwest of New York Penn Station.

== History ==
=== Planning ===
Penn South was sponsored by the International Ladies' Garment Workers Union based on a cooperative model promoted by the United Housing Foundation. The ILGWU first proposed a slum clearance project in Chelsea in early June 1956. Later that month, the New York City government endorsed the Penn Station South project. The New York City Committee on Slum Clearance recommended Penn Station South for federal funding in August 1956. However, local residents opposed the development because its proposed site would displace an estimated 7,500 residents. In response, in mid-1958, the Committee modified the plan so that two churches within the future development's site would be preserved. Ultimately, four churches were saved, including the Church of the Holy Apostles, which later became a New York City Landmark and a National Register of Historic Places landmark. The UHF's president, Abraham Kazan, later called the preservation a "mistake" because it had prevented Penn South from being developed earlier.

The site of Penn Station South was eligible for federal funding under the Title I of the Housing Act of 1949. The site was slated for demolition in July 1959. Despite this announcement, one developer started renovating three tenement buildings three months before their scheduled demolition date, in the hopes that these buildings would also be granted exemptions from demolition. In early June 1959, the federal government allocated $12 million toward the project.

The ILGWU acquired title to the land that June 28 and immediately began relocating residents. Residents who already lived on the land filed a lawsuit in an attempt to block the land sale. Groups of residents also organized picket lines and filed affidavits that attested to the hardships caused due to their relocations. In another act of protest, tenants living in the future Penn South site withheld rent payments to the ILGWU, their new landlord. The relocation proceedings were tense: one attorney who represented the protesters received death threats in response to his involvements in the protests. After Manhattan Borough President Hulan Jack received a report about "harrowing" relocations that were done in preparation for Penn Station South, Mayor Robert F. Wagner Jr. instituted new rules for Title I relocations around the city. Some former residents alleged that they had been relocated into tenements. Jack created a Citizens Watchdog Committee to oversee the treatment of residents who were being relocated. However, the committee itself disagreed on whether tenants were being treated unfairly during the relocation process. The committee was disbanded in December 1959 due to an inability to resolve these disagreements.

Ultimately, the vast majority of residents moved peacefully. By October 1960, all 2,646 families who had lived on the site had been relocated; they had received bonuses of up to $500, as well as a guarantee of new housing. In addition, as part of an agreement between the ILGWU and the site's residents, 600 of the families who had formerly occupied the site would be given housing in Penn South.

=== Construction ===
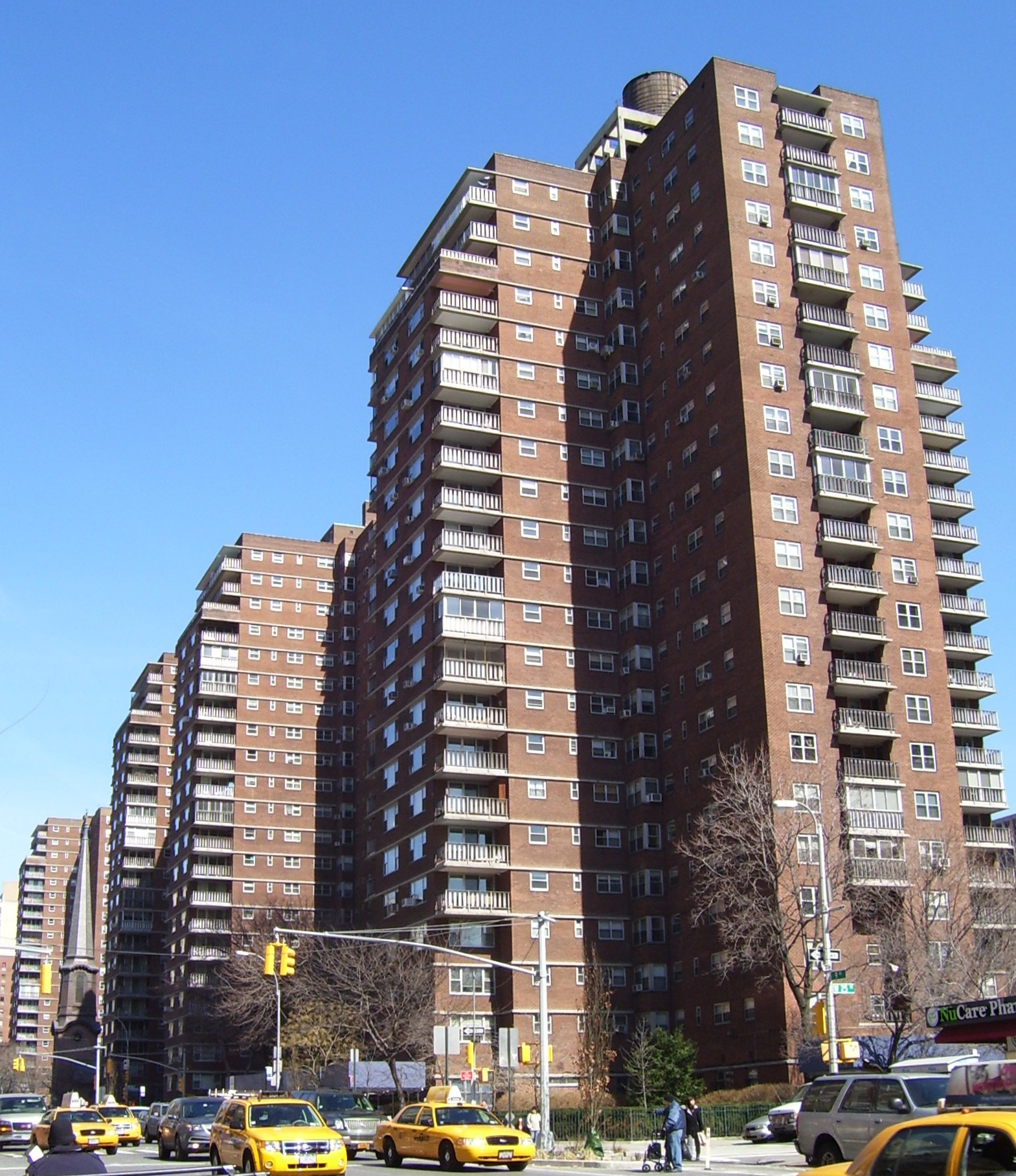
Penn South buildings along Ninth Avenue

Early on in the construction process, supporters of Penn South wanted to include "Chelsea" in the name, in order to better integrate it with the surrounding community. The New York state government awarded $2.42 million toward the Penn South project in April 1960. The construction of the development was funded by a 20-year, $23 million mortgage, to be repaid between 1962 and 1982 at a rate of 5.125%. In May 1960, it was announced that the historic Grand Opera House on 23rd Street would be demolished to make way for Penn South. The theater burned down in a fire the next month. RKO Pictures later constructed a new theater called Chelsea West Cinemas in Penn South near the site of the old opera house, now used by the School of Visual Arts as the SVA Theater.

Construction was delayed in July 1961 by a month-long strike by concrete-mixing workers. By that time, the ILGWU had hoped to complete and sell half of the apartments in Penn South, but were only able to find tenants for a quarter of the apartments.

A dedication ceremony was held on May 19, 1962. President John F. Kennedy addressed the workers on the project, with former First Lady Eleanor Roosevelt and New York Governor Nelson Rockefeller in attendance. Kennedy praised organized laborers for their work on the Penn South project, and cited the development as an example of what could be accomplished when laborers collaborated with public and private developers. That October, some tenants were prevented from moving into their units due to a union dispute regarding sink installations. The Carver Federal Savings and Loan Association, an African-American-run bank, opened a branch in Penn South in 1963, marking the first time that an African-American-run bank had been allowed to operate in a non-African-American neighborhood in New York City.

=== Later years ===
- Bayard Rustin Residence
- U.S. National Register of Historic Places
- New York State Register of Historic Places
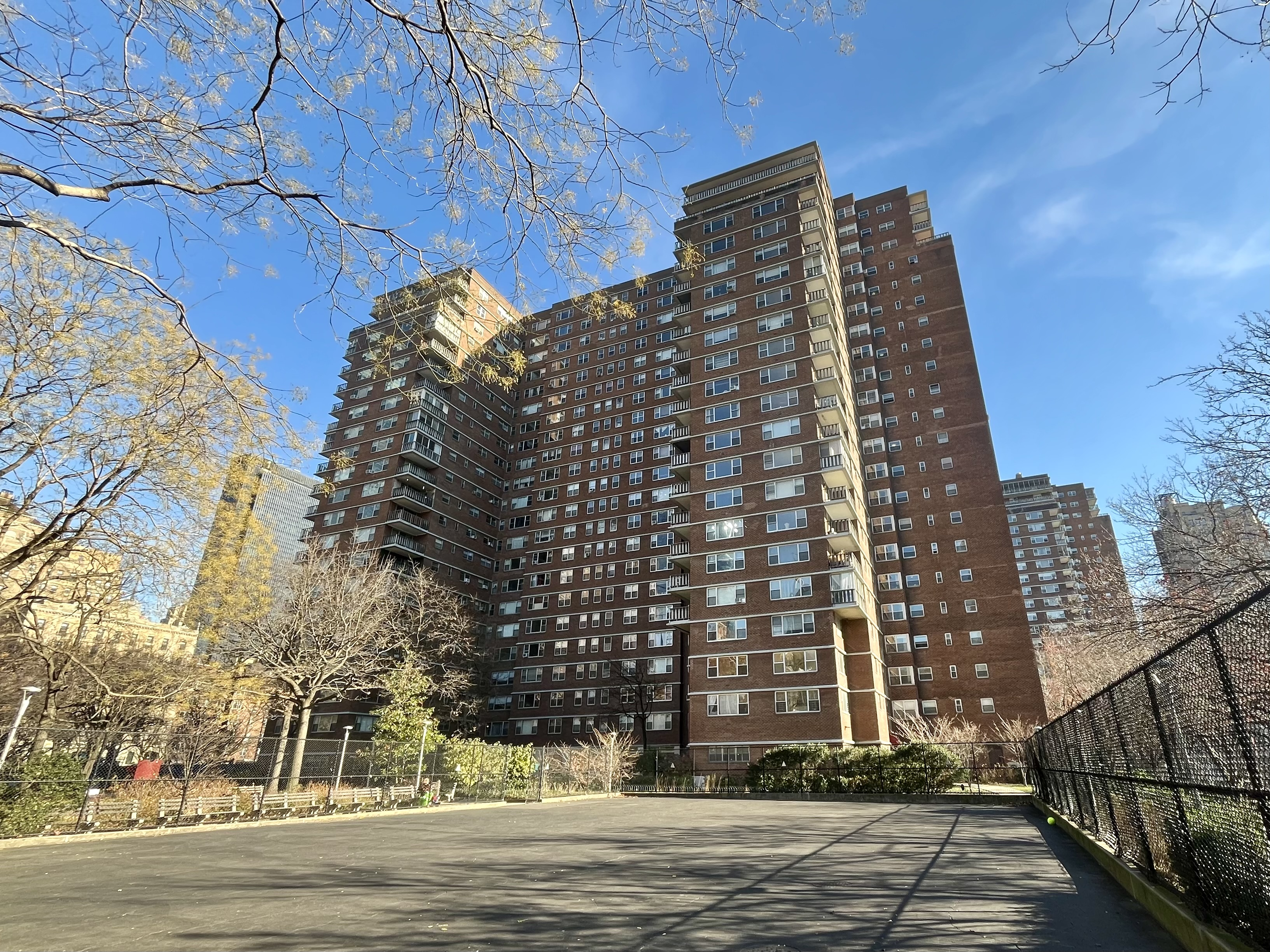
- Penn South Building 7

- Location within Manhattan Location within New York City Location within New York Location within the United States
- Location: 340 W. 28th St., New York, New York
- Coordinates: 40°44′56″N 73°59′51″W
- Area: 0.1 acres (0.040 ha)
- Built: 1963
- Architect: Herman Jessor
- NRHP reference No.: 16000062
- NYSRHP No.: 06101.018815 (Building 7A), 06101.019080 (Building 7B)

Significant dates
- Added to NRHP: March 8, 2016
- Designated NYSRHP: December 31, 2015

The opening of Penn Station South spurred new development and gentrification in the surrounding community. Despite the initial resistance to moving out, many of the site's former residents were given preference for the new housing. As of Penn South's 20th anniversary in 1983, about 600 of the site's original families had moved back into the complex. A New York Times article published that year said that Penn South was "widely regarded as one of the best-run cooperatives in the state". Penn South was composed mostly of elderly residents by 1990. A community garden and a seniors' program opened in Penn South in 1986, and an exercise room and playground was opened in 2000. The co-op renovated its brick facades in 1997. It subsequently replaced its underground electrical infrastructure in 2003 and its HVAC system in 2011.

Building 7 of the complex was listed on the National Register of Historic Places in 2016. Apartment 9J in the B portion of the building had been home to civil and gay rights activist Bayard Rustin from 1962 until his death in 1987.

=== Notable residents ===
- David Graeber, anthropologist, activist, and author; raised in Penn South and lived there sporadically until 2014
- Bayard Rustin, civil rights, socialism, nonviolence, and gay rights activist; lived there from 1962 to 1987

== Description ==
Penn South contains 2,820 units in ten 22-story red-brick buildings numbered from 1 to 10. The site is bounded counterclockwise from the west by Ninth Avenue, 23rd Street, Eighth Avenue, and 29th Street, and occupies an area of 36.44 acres (14.75 ha). The buildings were designed by Herman Jessor. The footprint of the Penn South superblocks includes playgrounds operated by the co-op and the Penn South Playground operated by the city's Parks Department.

Each housing unit has between 2 and 6 rooms. Penn South's desirability among prospective tenants has increased over the years: adjusted for inflation, the average cost of purchase was $650 per room in 1962, and it rose to $2,295 per room in 1983. As of 2012, there were 6,000 names on a waiting list of prospective residents looking to purchase one of the units in the development. In 2014, Penn South's management opened up a lottery system in which it randomly distributed some vacant apartments to applicants who met specified criteria. Nearly 50,000 people applied for 1,200 vacant apartments.

Although the residents of Penn South were generally lower- to middle-class, they were also known as a group that was "rich in spirit". During the 1975 New York City fiscal crisis, residents prepaid their rents six months in advance so the nearly bankrupt New York City government would be able to use the funds. Additionally, Penn South was among the first cooperative developments in New York City to draw power from gas, at a time when most other developments paid four times as much money to consume power from oil-powered generators. The possibility of Penn South generating its own power had been proposed as early as 1960, before the development had opened, due to disagreements with utility provider Consolidated Edison over electricity rates. The co-op was providing much of its own power, heating, and air-cooling by 1986.

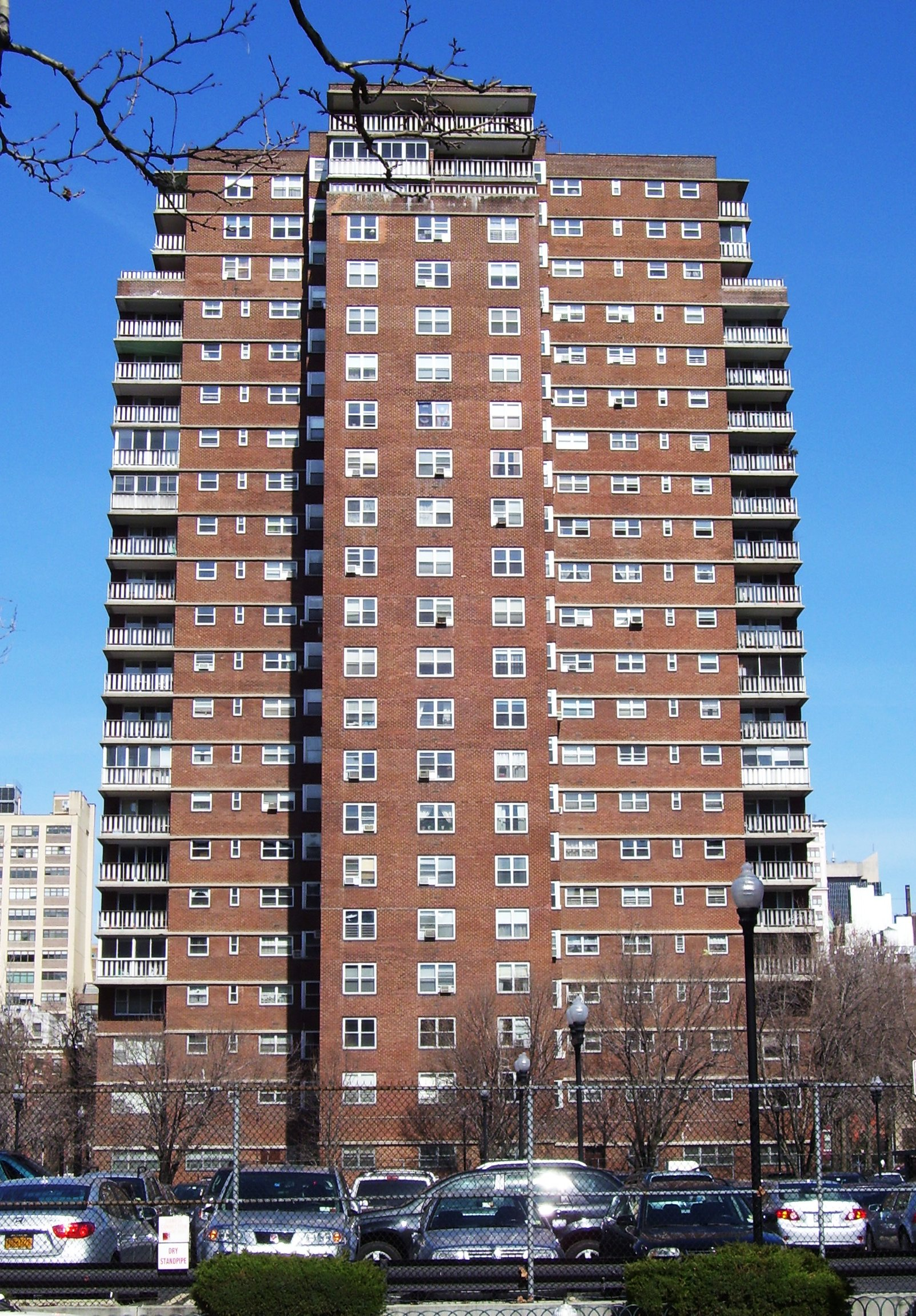
Seen from 26th Street

Penn South is served by the M20 bus operating on Seventh Avenue (southbound) and Eighth Avenue (northbound), and by the M11 bus operating on Ninth Avenue (southbound) and Tenth Avenue (northbound). The M23 Select Bus Service route operates crosstown along 23rd Street just south of the complex. The closest New York City Subway station is the 23rd Street station on the C and E trains at Eighth Avenue. Penn South is also situated one block east of the High Line elevated park and within less than 1 mile (1.6 km) of Penn Station, Chelsea Market, Chelsea Piers, and the Hudson River Park. The northern section of Penn South is located across from Chelsea Park on Ninth Avenue between 27th and 28th Streets. PS 33, a public school, is located just south of the park.

== Tax abatements ==
During Penn South's planning, the United Housing Foundation faced opposing demands. The mostly low-income families who already lived on the site wanted Penn South to have lower rent rates so that they could continue living in the area. Simultaneously, another proposed UHF development in Coney Island, Brooklyn, was being challenged by developer Fred Trump, who promised to pay higher tax rates on the Coney Island site than the UHF would.

To help keep Penn South affordable to those with limited incomes, New York City gave the development a 25-year tax abatement between 1961 and 1986. Taxes on properties in Penn South were levied at the same rates as on the older buildings they replaced. After the tax abatement expired in 1986, the cooperative's shareholders voted for a 25-year phase-in of real-estate taxes, which was approved by the city's Board of Estimate. A further adjustment was made when the development asked the city in 1999 for tax relief when the building boom in Chelsea caused the project's assessed value to skyrocket. The city responded in 2001 by allowing the development's taxes to be calculated based on the cooperative's income, as is done with Mitchell-Lama housing. In return, the development was to remain a limited-equity cooperative until 2022. Under the terms of agreements reached with the City of New York in 2002, and separately with the United States Department of Housing and Urban Development, Penn South's eligibility for tax abatements offered by Mitchell-Lama was extended to 2052. Penn South shareholders voted in 2011 to extend its contract with the city until 2030; in return, the city government awarded the co-op more than $25 million to rehabilitate the complex's HVAC system. In February 2017, the New York City Council extended Penn South's tax abatement to 2052, ninety years after the development's opening.

== See also ==
- Mitchell-Lama Housing Program
- Southbridge Towers
- Co-op City, Bronx
- Cooperative Village
- Hudson Yards Redevelopment Project
- Essex Crossing
- Marcus Garvey Village
