= Flip tax =

Fee paid by a seller or buyer on a housing co-op transaction

A flip tax is a fee paid by a seller or buyer on a housing co-op transaction, typically in New York City. It is not a tax and is not deductible as a property tax. It is a transfer fee, payable upon the sale of an apartment to the co-op.

Flip taxes are considered a method to help raise money for a co-op's overhead expenses without raising the maintenance fees or assessing flat charge to all residences. Charging the fee to those who are leaving the building seems to be the most politically feasible.

== Types ==
- Flat fee
- Dollar amount based on shares allocated to the subject apartment
- Percentage based on the sales price
- Percentage based on the net profit of the sale
- Fee based on the duration the seller has owned the apartments — shorter time periods of ownership typically bring higher fees

== Legality ==
The imposition of flip taxes in New York City has been supported in the courts. The New York State Legislature in July 1986 acted on a proposal from the Council of New York Cooperatives and Condominiums and defined in what way co-ops could legally impose these fees. Specifically, the law allows such an assessment if either of the following applies:

1. if it is sanctioned in the co-op's proprietary lease
2. if the lease is amended with more than two thirds of shareholders approving.

Flip taxes appear to be legal for condominiums in New York City and New Jersey but are generally uncommon.
