= Southbridge Towers =

Residential towers in Manhattan, New York

Coordinates: 40.7093°N 74.0035°W

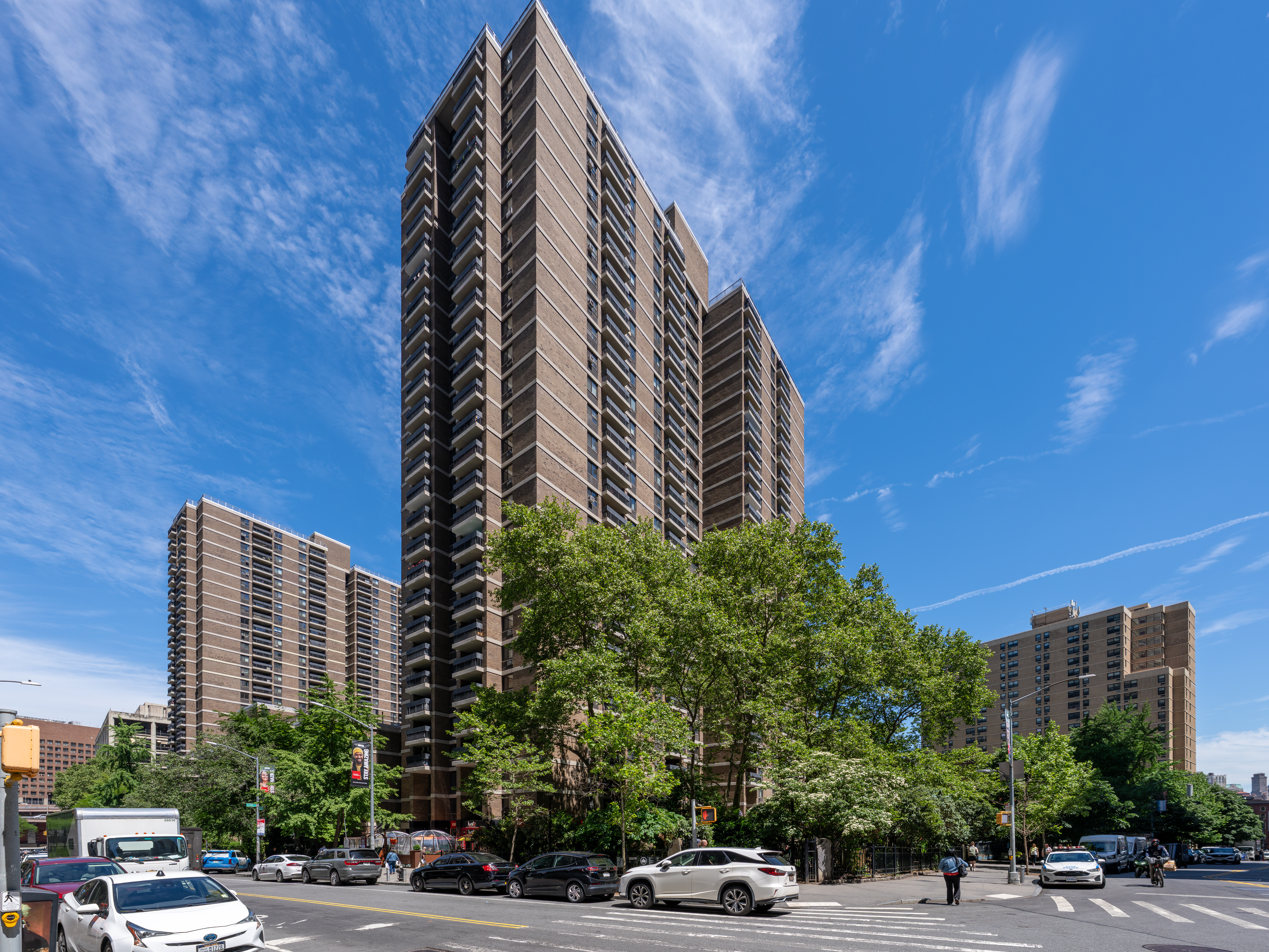
Southbridge Towers

Southbridge Towers is a big housing cooperative development located in the Civic Center neighborhood of Lower Manhattan, New York City. It is situated south of the entrance ramp to the Brooklyn Bridge between Pearl, Gold, Fulton, and Frankfort streets. Southbridge consists of four 27-story towers and five six-story buildings, which collectively include 1,651 apartments with a total of 331,577 square feet (30,804.5 m^{2}) of floor area.

Built between 1965 and 1971 by Tishman Realty & Construction, the complex is noteworthy for a few reasons. Southbridge Towers was intended as an anchor project of the Brooklyn Bridge Southwest Urban Renewal Area, described as a "slum-clearance effort" in the New York Times' article on Mayor Wagner's public announcement in 1964. Other elements were Pace College and the office building at 100 Gold Street, which would have Bache & Company among its tenants.

From inception, this "middle income cooperative apartment development on the Lower East Side"was designed as affordable housing, financed as a subsidized co-op under the Mitchell-Lama housing program. Organized as a corporation under the Limited Profit Housing Corporation Law of the State of New York, Southbridge Towers, Inc. took title to the complex in July 1968.

The complex's architect, Kelly & Gruzen, was "virtually the house architect for the City Hall area." The firm was responsible for Bache & Company, Chatham Tower and Chatham Green Apartments, Police Headquarters, and Beekman-Downtown Hospital, among other buildings in the area.

Although the building had a no-pet clause, some tenants moved in with dogs, which led to complaints. Management company Sulzberger-Rolfe, Inc., filed against the owners in court, leading to a State Appellate Court ruling against them in 1973. The company said the action was warranted "after many tenants complained of fear riding in elevators with large dogs and of dogs defecating in hallways and stairwells." As reported in The New York Times, "A plan of 'compassion' was worked out...Original tenants would be allowed to keep their dogs by paying a $15-a-month 'maintenance' fee, but no new dogs would be allowed in the building."

In October 2005, the cooperative's board of directors voted to undertake a study that could cost up to $25,000 to explore privatization of the building complex.

In September 2014, the residents of Southbridge Towers voted to privatize under the Mitchell-Lama law and reconstitute as a private co-op. The privatization was completed on September 10, 2015.

== See also ==
- Cooperative Village
- Marcus Garvey Village
