= United Workers Cooperatives =

Buildings in the Bronx, New York

- U.S. National Register of Historic Places
- U.S. National Historic Landmark
- New York City Landmark
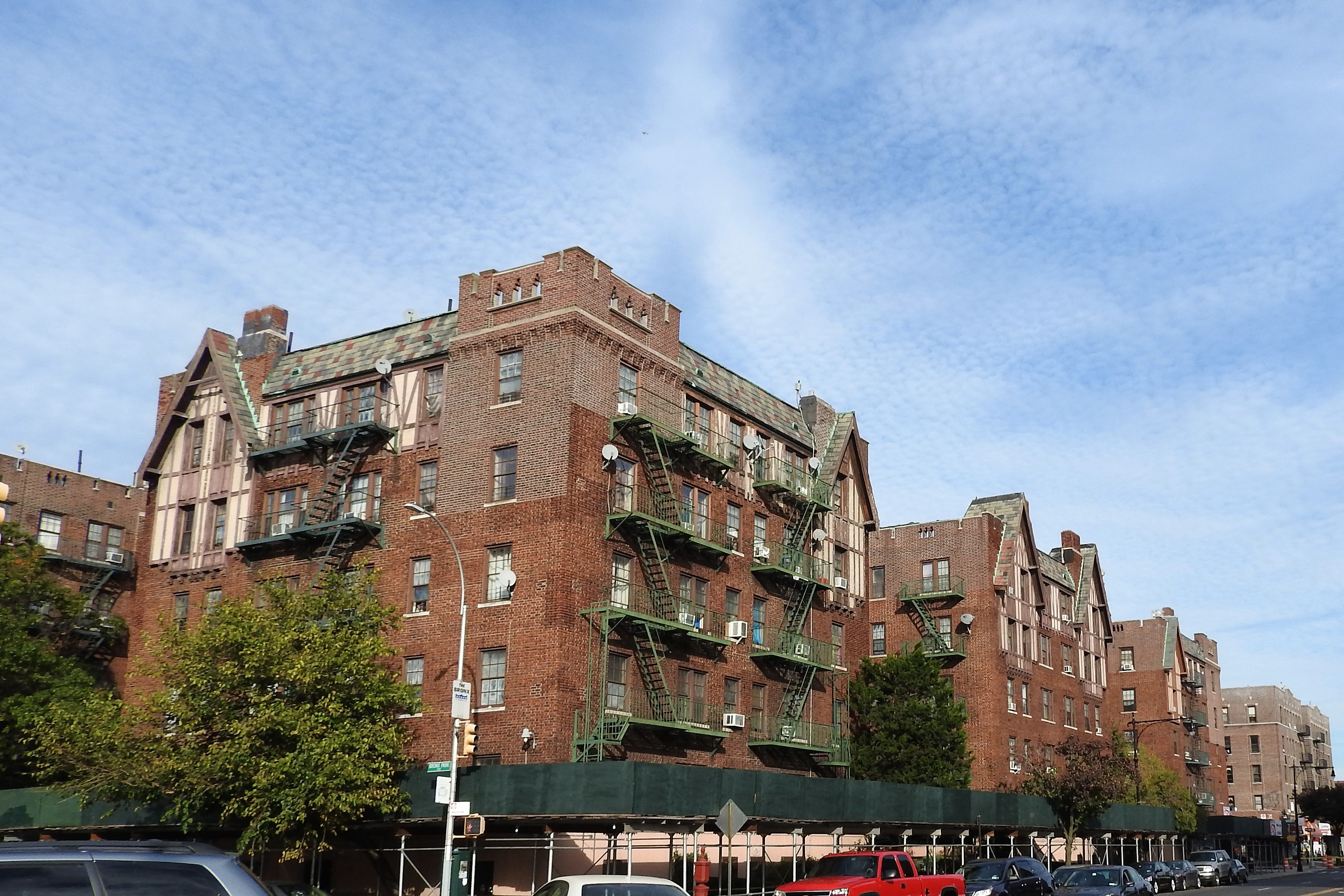

- Location within New York City
- Location: 2700-2870 Bronx Park East, Bronx, NY 10467
- Coordinates: 40°51′59″N 73°52′11″W
- Area: 5.4 acres (2.2 ha)
- Built: 1926
- Architect: Springsteen & Goldhammer; Jessor, Herman J.
- Architectural style: Tudor Revival
- NRHP reference No.: 86002518
- NYCL No.: 1795

Significant dates
- Added to NRHP: September 11, 1986
- Designated NHL: July 17, 1991
- Designated NYCL: June 2, 1992

United Workers Cooperatives, also known as Allerton Coops (colloquially Coops or Commie Coops), is a historic apartment building complex located at 2700–2870 Bronx Park East in Allerton, Bronx, New York City. The complex includes three contributing buildings and five contributing structures. The Tudor Revival style buildings were built during two construction campaigns, 1926–1927 and 1927–1929 by the United Workers' Association. The buildings feature half timbered gables, horizontal half-timbered bands topped with sloping slate roofs, corbelled and crenellated towers, and picturesque chimneys.

== History ==
=== Planning ===
The complex was built by the United Workers' Association (part of the Industrial Workers of the World or "IWW"), and was an important early example of cooperative housing for working-class people. Most of the Association members were secular Jews with Communist political leanings who were engaged in the needle trades. The association sought to improve the living standards of its members, many of whom lived in squalid conditions in the tenements of the Lower East Side.

The plans for forming "the Coops", has its origins partially as a response to the Palmer Raids in 1919 where radicals and immigrants were targeted by the government, with neighborhoods mapped by ethnicity. Facing this, Jewish socialists & communists began selling shares for the planned cooperative at $250 a room (equivalent to $4,643 in 2025).

They bought a plot of land in 1925 in an undeveloped section of the Bronx, near the open space of Bronx Park, and envisioned a community of socially and politically engaged residents who would each have an equal say in the running of the complex, regardless of the size of their apartments or the prices that they paid for them.

=== Foundation & existence ===
The complex had classrooms, a library, and other amenities and activities that were uncommon in other cooperative complexes that were built for profit. The complex also had a non-eviction policy, so although many workers had trouble paying rent during the Great Depression, they had greater security during it. It was also racially integrated after active efforts from the Jewish tenants living there.

The 'Coops' residents played a role in the 1931-33 New York City rent strikes. Playing a crucial supporting role for striking tenants, picketing with the striking tenants and sometimes fighting cops who attempted evictions of the tenants.

In a 2009 documentary, former residents of the UWC describe their experience supporting the rent strikes,

"and the furniture was sitting out on the sidewalk and this was terrible frighting to me."
"The women, and my mother included, would go up into the apartment, they'd crowd into the apartment so they'd stand shoulder to shoulder so the sheriff deputies could not get in to evict the family."
"I remember yelling at the policemen, they'd laughed and said we came from little Moscow."

In the 1940s, facing potential foreclosure there was the opportunity to re-mortgage if rent was raised a dollar more a month, however political divisions among the coop tenants lead to the discussion breaking down and ultimately voting against it. Though considered a social success, the complex failed financially in the Great Depression and was converted to rental housing in 1943. Taken over by the BX Corporation that year. In spite of this, because of the highly organized nature of the tenants there, the conditions in the Coops remained largely the same at first. Later on they were targeted by the FBI during the Second Red Scare (1947–1957). The electoral voting districts were also split 3 ways along the Coops to prevent them voting as a Bloc at the time.

After decades of neglect by a succession of landlords, the complex was purchased and renovated by a new owner in the mid-1980s.

The complex was listed on the National Register of Historic Places in 1986, and was designated a National Historic Landmark in 1991. It was designated a New York City landmark in 1992.

== See also ==
- Amalgamated Housing Cooperative
- List of National Historic Landmarks in New York City
- National Register of Historic Places listings in Bronx County, New York
