= LeFrak City =

Large apartment complex in Queens, New York

Coordinates: 40°44′11″N 73°51′45″W

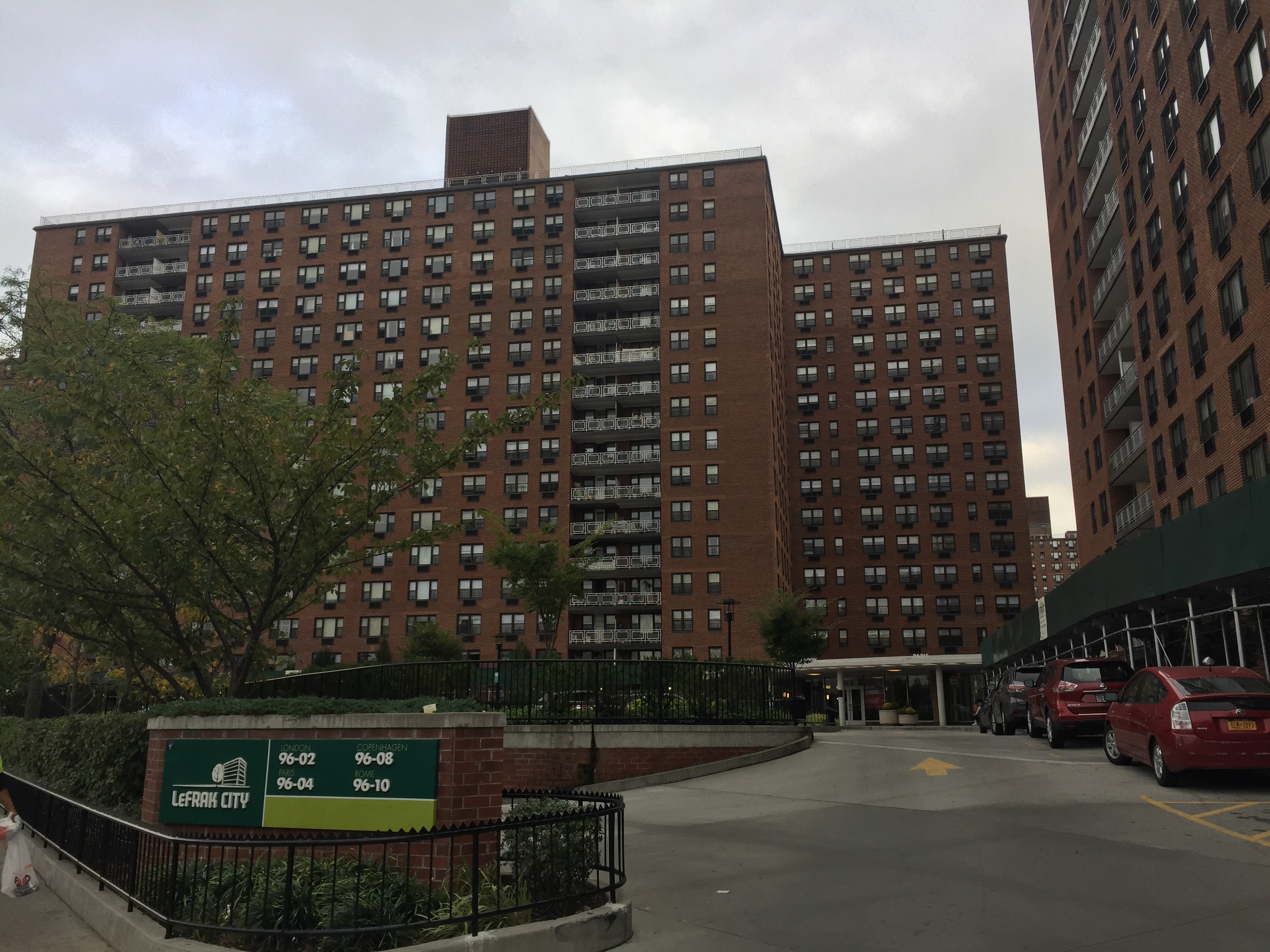
LeFrak City

LeFrak City (originally spelled Lefrak and pronounced le-FRAK) is a 4,605-apartment development in the southernmost region of Corona and the easternmost part of Elmhurst, a neighborhood in the New York City borough of Queens. It is located between Junction Boulevard to the west, 57th Avenue to the north, 99th Street to the east, and the Long Island Expressway to the south.

== Description ==
The complex of twenty 17-story apartment towers covers 40 acres (16 ha) and houses over 14,000 people in 4,605 apartments. (Each building's topmost floor is signed as 18, and there are no thirteenth floors.) The buildings are all named after cities or countries around the world and are grouped in clusters of four based on their theme. This naming system came about during the 1964 New York World's Fair, which was located in nearby Flushing Meadows–Corona Park. The development is part of Queens Community Board 4.

The site includes sitting and play areas (including two artificial turf fields), sports courts, a swimming pool, a branch of the Queens Borough Public Library, a post office, two large office buildings, shops, and over 3,500 parking spaces. A $70 million renovation project, which ended in 2017, entailed installing solar panels atop the complex's roofs; updating the facades, boiler rooms, building interiors, swimming pool, and roofs; constructing new play areas; adding wheelchair access; and landscaping the grounds. LeFrak City also contains New York City's first robotic security guard. The Queens Center Mall and Rego Center are both two to three blocks away from the development, as is the Woodhaven Boulevard station on the New York City Subway's E, F, M, and R trains.

== History ==
Named for its developer, the LeFrak Organization (founded by Samuel J. LeFrak), LeFrak City was built in 1962–1971 primarily for working- and middle-class families who were interested in modern facilities but could not afford or did not desire to live in Manhattan. The complex was built atop Horse Brook, a small stream that once wound through Elmhurst along the path of the LIE. The land on which LeFrak City is located was previously undeveloped marshland, and the megablocks of LeFrak City are a remnant of the lack of development on the site.

The fortunes of the buildings have been closely tied to housing and social trends in New York in general, and after a period of decline in the 1970s and rapid white flight, the complex became home to a very diverse population. The development remains popular with 98% occupancy due to its reasonable rents and large apartments.

== Notable residents ==
Notable current and former residents of LeFrak City include:

- Akinyele, rapper
- Kenny Anderson, former basketball player for the New Jersey Nets
- Telfar Clemens, fashion designer
- Bryant Dunston, professional basketball player
- Ehinomen Ehikhamenor, cruiserweight professional boxer
- Ellie Greenwich and Jeff Barry, composers
- Kaz Hirai, President and CEO of Sony Corporation
- Simon Nabatov, pianist
- Noreaga (aka N.O.R.E.), rapper
- Nneka Onuorah, director and producer
- Kool G Rap, rapper
- Kenny Smith, sports commentator and former NBA basketball player
- Jermaine Turner, former Super League basketball player
- Mark White, bass player for the Spin Doctors
- Hamidou Diallo, professional basketball player

== See also ==
- Cooperative Village
- Co-op City, Bronx
- Mitchell Lama
- Marcus Garvey Village
- Parkchester, Bronx
- Parkfairfax, Virginia
- Parkmerced, San Francisco
- Park La Brea, Los Angeles
- Penn South
- Riverton Houses
- Rochdale Village, Queens
- Starrett City, Brooklyn
- Stuyvesant Town–Peter Cooper Village
