= Frederick H. Ecker =

American businessman

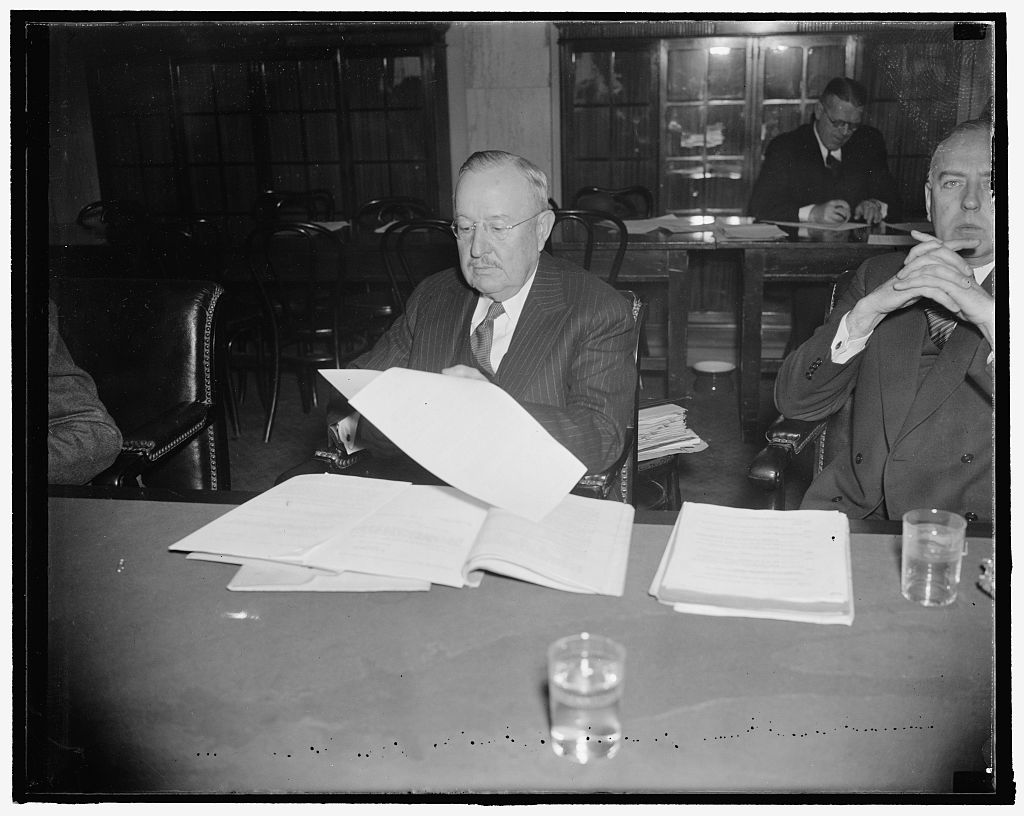
- Born: August 30, 1867
- Died: March 20, 1964 (aged 96)
- Occupation: Insurance Executive
- Years active: 1883–1964
- Notable work: Stuyvesant Town–Peter Cooper Village

Frederick Hudson Ecker (August 30, 1867 – March 20, 1964) was an Insurance executive, and president of the Metropolitan Life Insurance Company. He won the 1947 Gold Medal Award from The Hundred Year Association of New York.

== Life ==
He was born in Phoenicia, New York, and grew up in Brooklyn. He starting working for Metropolitan as an office boy, and rose to become chairman. He was president, from 1929 to 1936.

He was involved in the company's real estate investments: Parkchester, and Stuyvesant Town–Peter Cooper Village and Riverton Houses in Manhattan. These projects were racially segregated, which Ecker justified by saying, "If we brought Negroes into these developments, it would be to the detriment of the city, because it would depress all the surrounding property.”

In 1935, he was questioned by the Securities and Exchange Commission, about railroad investments. In 1940, he defended investing in the Empire State Building. In 1941, the company invested in large garden apartment developments in San Francisco, and Los Angeles.

== Family ==
In 1890, married Henrietta Worrall Harris; in 1932, he married Mrs. Ann Edith Strafford. She died in 1950. His son Frederic W. Ecker (1896-1964) was his second successor (after Leroy A. Lincoln) as president and chairman of Metropolitan Life.
