= Stuyvesant Town–Peter Cooper Village =

Residential development in Manhattan, New York

- Apartment Community
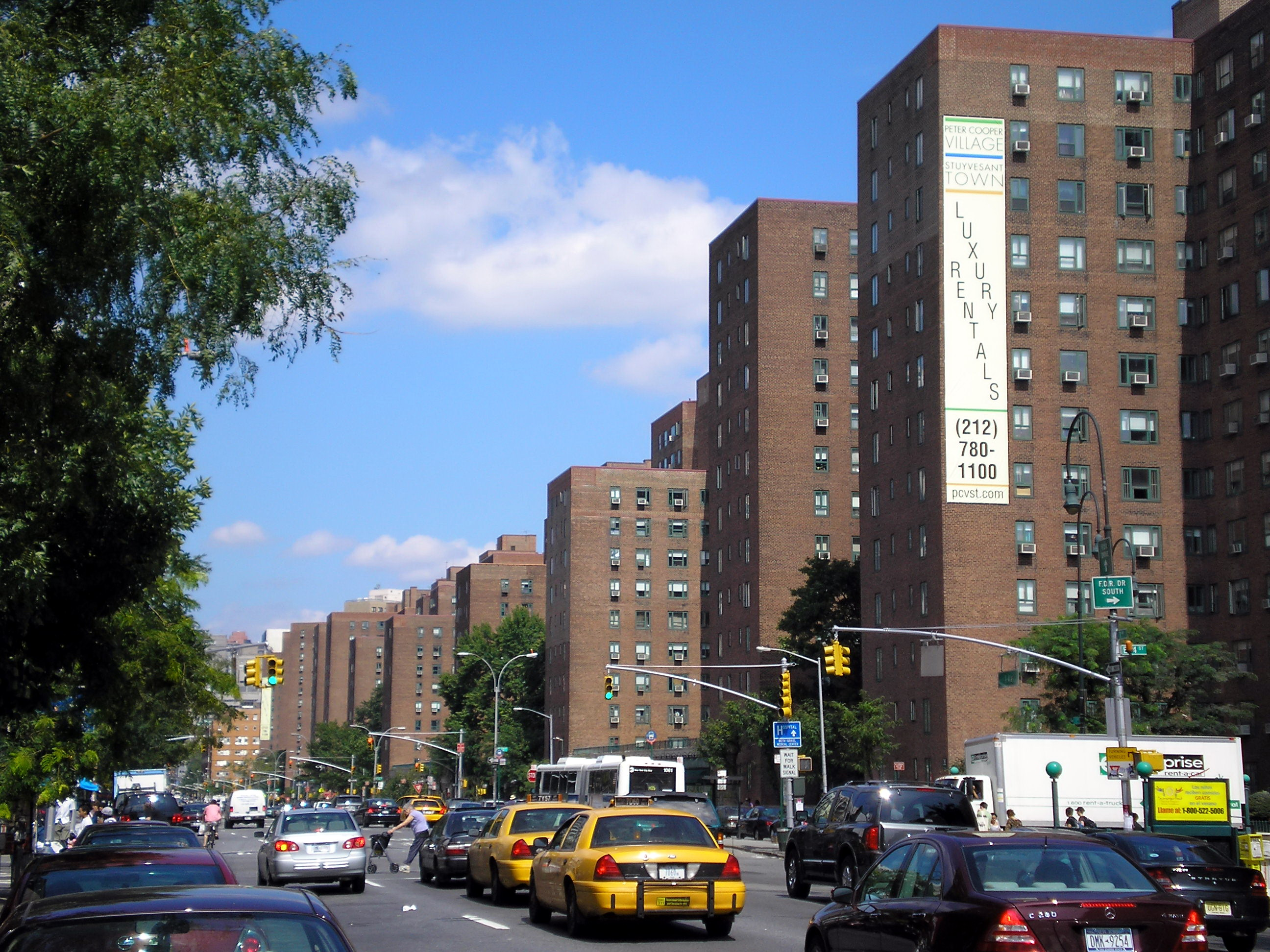
- Stuyvesant Town as seen from the south at First Avenue in 2006
- Nickname: StuyTown
- Location in New York City
- Coordinates: 40.732°N 73.978°W
- Country: United States
- State: New York
- City: New York City
- Borough: Manhattan
- Community District: Manhattan 6

Area
  - Total: 0.208 sq mi (0.54 km^{2})

Population (2020)
  - Total: 22,512
  - Density: 108,000/sq mi (41,800/km^{2})

Ethnicity
  - White: 65.6%
  - Asian: 16.3%
  - Hispanic: 8.9%
  - Black: 3.1%
  - Other: 6.1%

Economics
  - Median income: $99,324 (Peter Cooper Village), $86,345 (Stuyvesant Town)
- Time zone: UTC−5 (Eastern)
  - Summer (DST): UTC−4 (EDT)
- ZIP Codes: 10009–10010
- Area codes: 212, 332, 646, and 917
- Website: www.stuytown.com

Stuyvesant Town–Peter Cooper Village (/ˈstaɪvəsənt/ STY-və-sənt), colloquially known as StuyTown, is a large post-World War II private residential development on the east side of the New York City borough of Manhattan. The complex consists of 110 red brick apartment buildings on an 80-acre (32 ha) tract stretching from First Avenue to Avenue C, between 14th and 23rd Streets. Stuyvesant Town–Peter Cooper Village is split up into two parts: Stuyvesant Town, south of 20th Street, and Peter Cooper Village, north of 20th Street. Together, the two developments contain 11,250 apartments.

Stuyvesant Town–Peter Cooper Village was planned, beginning in 1942, and opened its first building in 1947. It replaced a neighborhood known as the Gas House district. The complex has been sold multiple times, most recently in 2015 when it was sold to Ivanhoé Cambridge and Blackstone for $5.45 billion.

Stuyvesant Town–Peter Cooper Village is part of Manhattan Community District 6, and its primary ZIP Codes are 10009 and 10010. It is patrolled by the 13th Precinct of the New York City Police Department (NYPD).

== Geography ==
Stuyvesant Town–Peter Cooper Village is bounded by First Avenue on the west, 23rd Street on the north, Avenue C on the east, and 14th Street on the south. The complex covers about 80 acres (320,000 m^{2}) of land in total, including parkland. Stuyvesant Town–Peter Cooper Village contains 11,250 apartments in 55 buildings, which have 110 separate street addresses.

The buildings south of 20th Street are known as Stuyvesant Town, or "Stuy Town". They were named after Peter Stuyvesant, the last director-general of the Dutch colony of New Amsterdam, whose farm occupied the site in the 17th century. The buildings north of 20th Street are called Peter Cooper Village, named after the 19th-century industrialist, inventor and philanthropist Peter Cooper, who founded Cooper Union.

Stuyvesant Town–Peter Cooper Village abuts the Stuyvesant Square and Gramercy Park neighborhoods on the west, the East Village and Alphabet City to the south, and Kips Bay to the north. The surrounding area to the west is notable for a historic two-block park surrounded by the old Stuyvesant High School called Stuyvesant Square, Saint George's Church, and the Beth Israel Medical Center, which closed in 2025.

== History ==
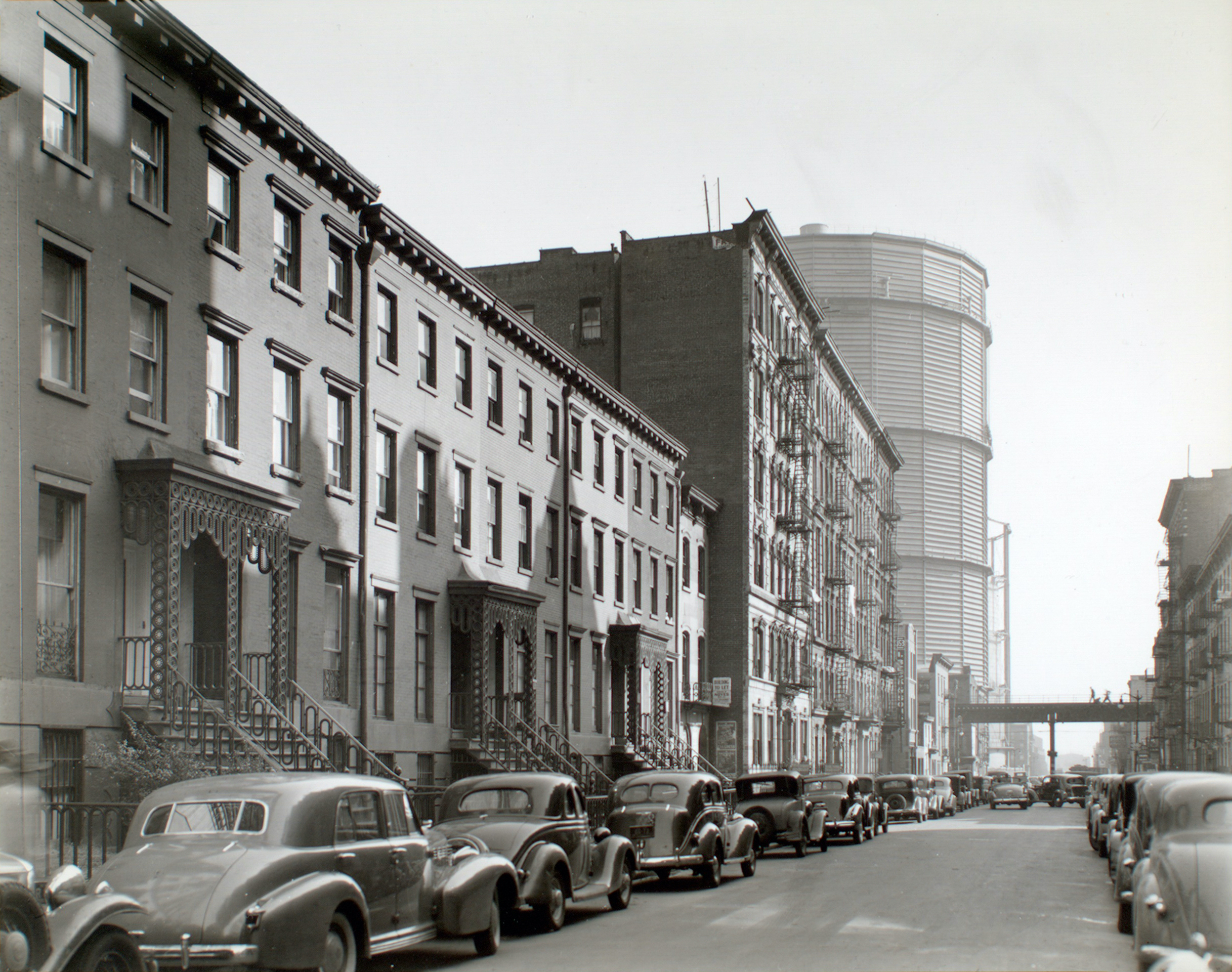
East 20th Street looking east in the direction of First Avenue in 1938. This picture shows two of the huge gas holders that gave the area the name Gas House District; the block in the foreground did not become part of the Stuyvesant Town–Peter Cooper Village complex, but the area on the east side of First Avenue, where the tanks are, did. (Photo by Berenice Abbott)

=== Gas House District ===
In 1842, one gas storage tank was erected at East 23rd Street and the river, quickly followed by the construction of other gas tanks. By the late 19th century, the site of the complex had become known as the "Gas House District" because of the many gas storage tanks owned by Consolidated Gas Company that dominated the streetscapes. The tanks, which sometimes leaked, made the area undesirable to live in, as did the Gas House Gang and other predators who operated in the area.

The population was predominantly poor, at first largely Irish, and then German and Jewish American. Later, Slovaks and other Eastern Europeans were the dominant ethnic groups, including a large population of Armenians who lived in the upper Twenties between First and Lexington avenues.

Crime in the district was endemic. When Alexander S. Williams was promoted to police captain on May 31, 1872, and assigned to the area, he met the gangs' violence with equal force of his own, putting together a brute squad that beat up gangsters with clubs. He commented: "There is more law at the end of a policeman's nightstick than in a decision of the Supreme Court."

With the construction of the FDR Drive, the area began to improve. By the 1930s, all but four tanks were gone, and, while shabby, the area was no more blighted than many parts of the city after the years of the Great Depression.

Before the construction of Stuyvesant Town, the neighborhood contained 18 city blocks, with public schools, churches, factories, private homes, apartments, small businesses and even relatively new modern-style apartment buildings. In all, 600 buildings, containing 3,100 families, 500 stores and small factories, three churches, three schools, and two theaters, were razed. As would be repeated in later urban renewal projects, an estimated 3,000 families and 11,000 persons were forced to move from the neighborhood. In 1945, The New York Times called the move from the site "the greatest and most significant mass movement of families in New York's history." The last residents of the Gas House district, the Delman family, moved out in May 1946, allowing demolition to be completed shortly thereafter.

=== Planning ===
Due to a New York City housing shortage that had been growing since the Depression, Stuyvesant Town was already being planned as a post-war housing project in 1942–43, some years before the end of World War II. A provision was made that the rental applications of veterans would have selection priority. The complex was developed by the Metropolitan Life Insurance Company, and was based on its earlier development in the Parkchester neighborhood of the Bronx, which was completed in 1942. The same companies and developers also built Riverton, which was completed around the same time.

In January 1945, Metropolitan Life mapped out its post-war plans for 6,000 residents of Peter Cooper Village, which would stretch east of First Avenue, between 20th and 22nd streets, while efforts were made to acquire land north of 22nd Street. The project would be an extension of the previously announced Stuyvesant Town.

Metropolitan Life president Frederick H. Ecker said of Stuyvesant Town in its initial offering that it would make it possible for generations of New Yorkers "to live in a park – to live in the country in the heart of New York." On the first day the company received 7,000 applications; it would receive 100,000 applicants by the time of first occupancy. The complex's first tenants, two World War II veterans and their families, moved into the first completed building on August 1, 1947. At the time, rents ranged from $50 to $91 per month.

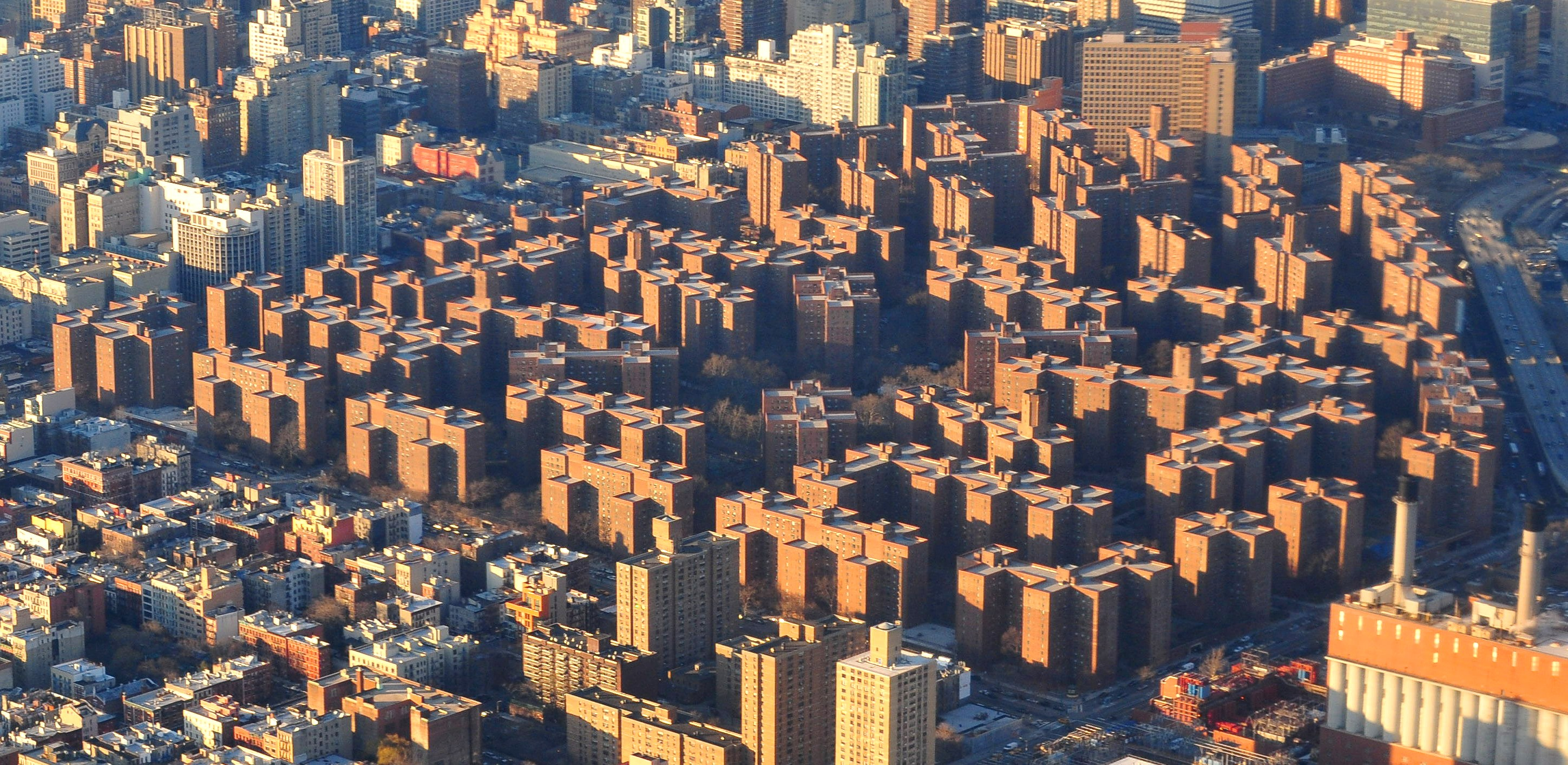
Stuyvesant Town (bottom and left) and Peter Cooper Village (top and right) as seen from the air over the East River looking northwest (2012)

==== Controversy ====
Stuyvesant Town was controversial from the beginning. In 1943, the National Association of Housing Officials described the fight as "a battle up to now lacking only in beer bottles and murder." Although nominally a private development, it was championed by Parks Commissioner Robert Moses, who has been called the "dominant force in [the] creation" of both Stuyvesant Town and Peter Cooper Village. At the behest of Mayor Fiorello La Guardia, Moses sought "to induce insurance companies and savings banks to enter the field of large-scale slum clearance." It was enabled by various state laws and amendments which permitted private companies to enter what was previously a public field of action.

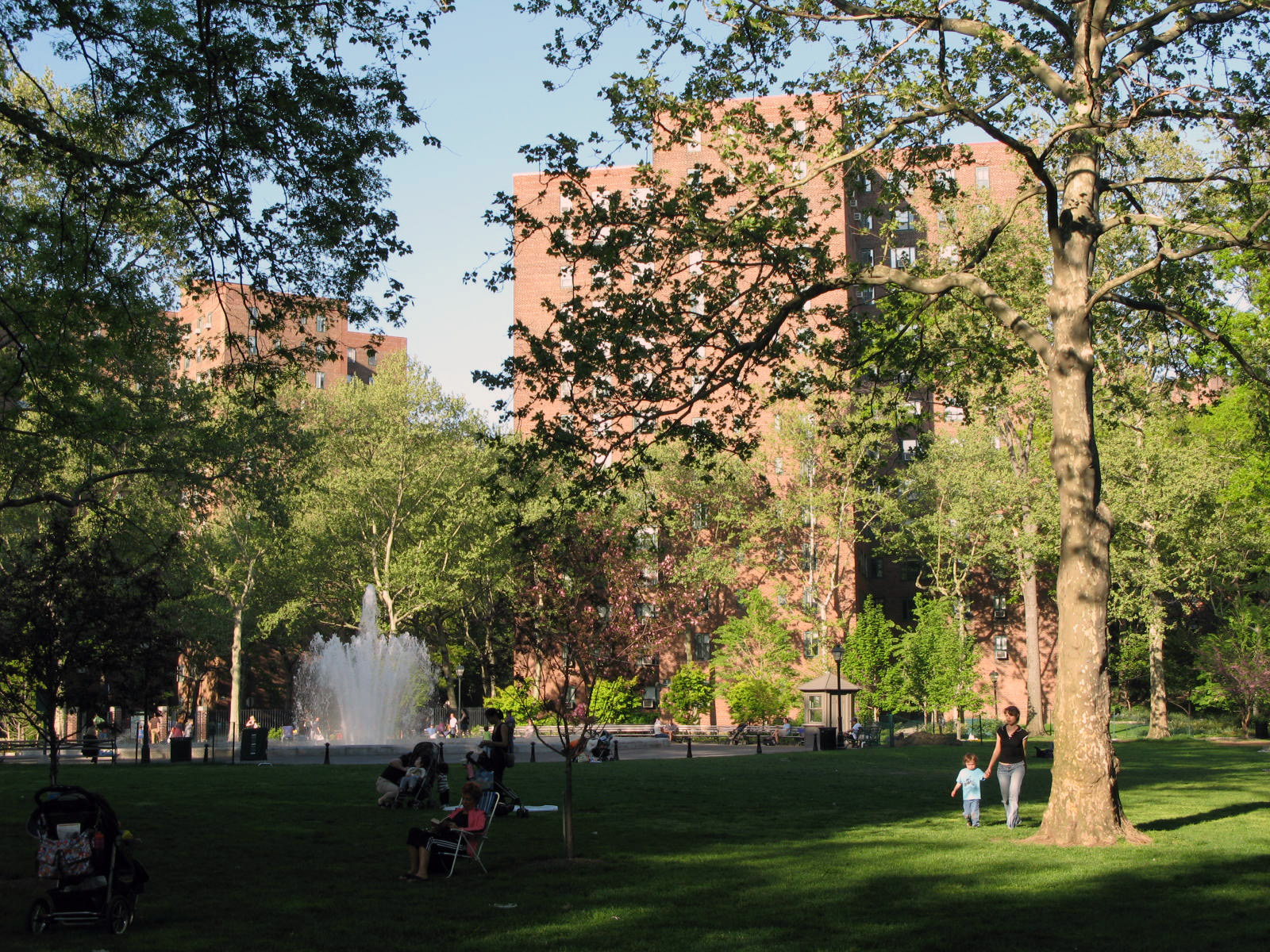
Stuyvesant Town's central green, the Oval

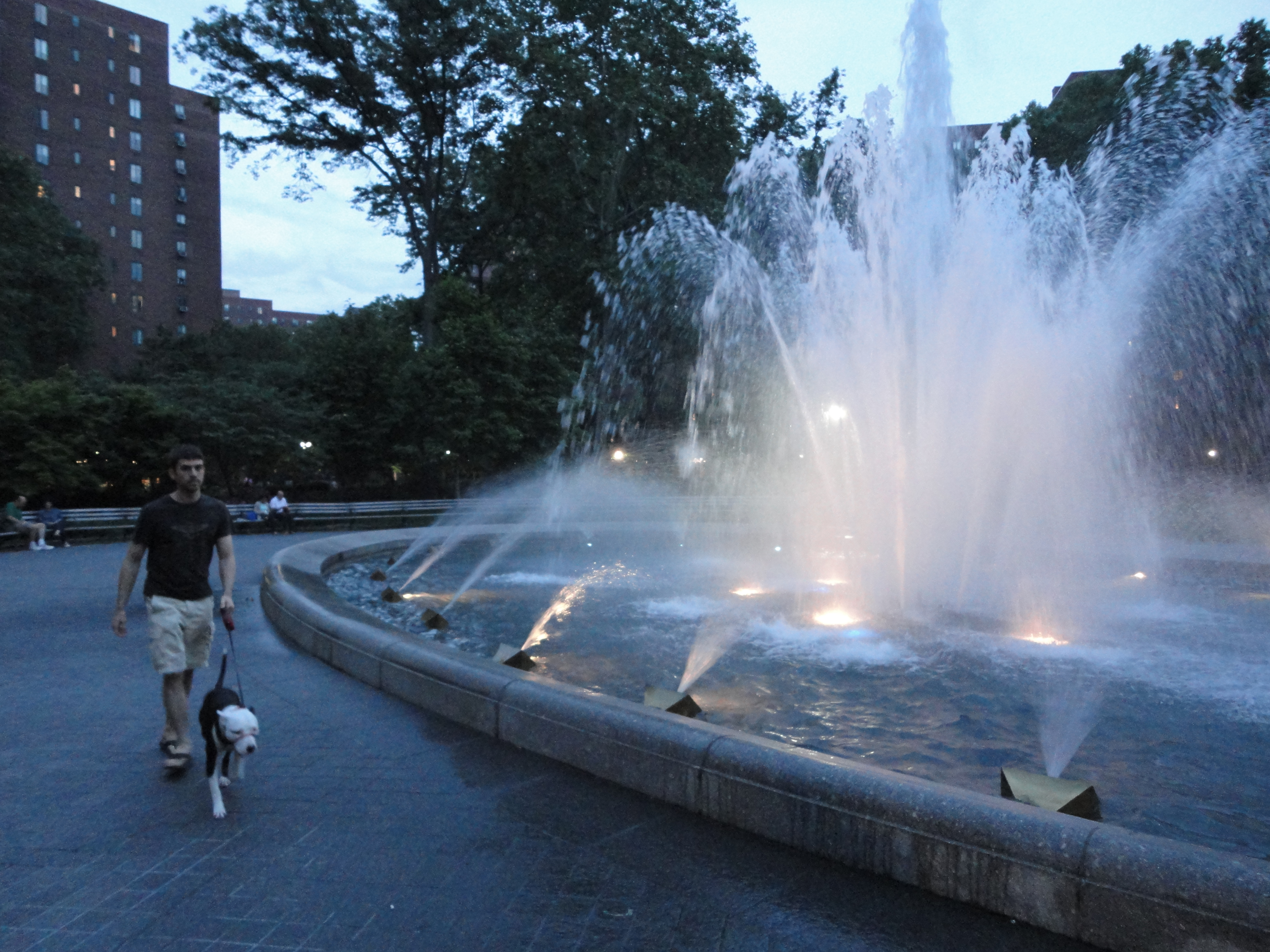
The fountain in the Oval

The new public-private partnership, and the contract entered between the city and the developer, the Metropolitan Life Insurance Company, were the source of much debate. Among the issues at stake were use of the power of eminent domain for private purposes; the reversion of public streets and land, such as public school property, to private ownership; the 25-year tax exemption granted by the contract; and the lack of any restrictions on the company prohibiting discrimination in selecting tenants.

When the $50 million Stuyvesant Town plan was approved by the City Planning Commission on May 20, 1943, by a five to one vote, discrimination against African-Americans was already a significant topic of debate. Councilmen Stanley M. Isaacs and Benjamin J. Davis Jr. sought to introduce a provision into the contract that would prevent racial or religious discrimination in tenant selection. This provision was not accepted; those who rejected it, including Robert Moses, argued that the company's profitability would be harmed, and that opponents were "obviously looking for a political issue and not for results in the form of actual slum clearance."

In the years after it opened, Black people were barred from living in the complex. Metropolitan Life's president, Frederick H. Ecker, stated that "negroes and whites do not mix". He also believed that integrating Stuyvesant Town would depress demand for, and hence valuation of, other real estate in the area.

Lee Lorch, a City College of New York professor, petitioned to allow African Americans into the development, and was fired from his teaching position as a result of pressure from Metropolitan Life. Upon accepting a position at Pennsylvania State University, Lorch allowed a Black family to occupy his apartment, thus circumventing the "no Negroes" rule. As a result of pressure from Metropolitan Life, he was dismissed from his new position as well.

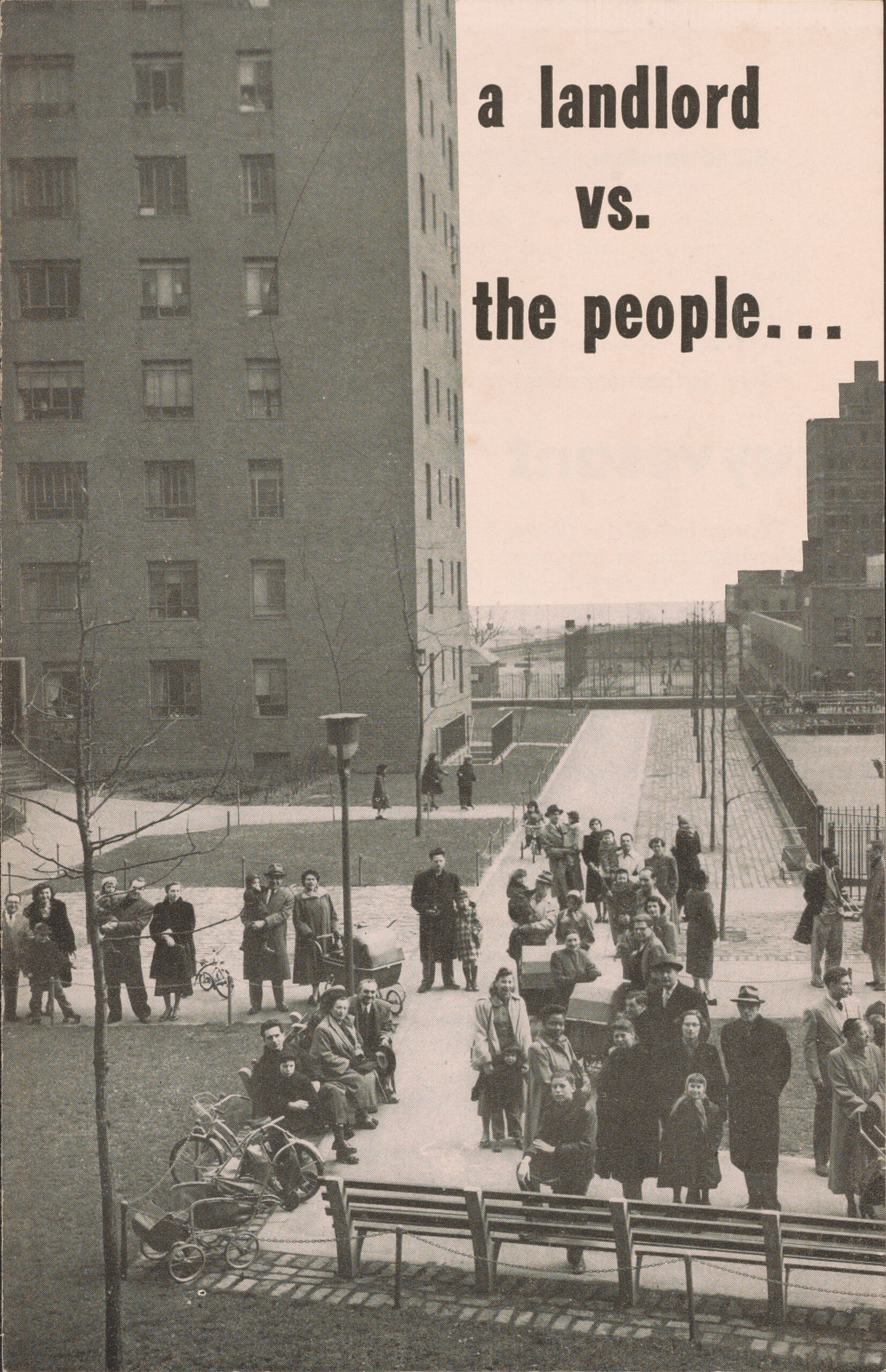
1950 Pamphlet by the Town and Village Committee to End Discrimination in Stuyvesant Town. Depicts 19 families who faced eviction as a result of their involvement in the fight against segregation.

Lawsuits were filed on the basis that the project was public or semi-public, and thus violated anti-discrimination laws for New York City public housing. In July 1947, a New York Supreme Court judge ruled that the development was private and that, in the absence of laws to the contrary, the company could discriminate as it saw fit. The judge wrote, "It is well settled that the landlord of a private apartment or dwelling house may, without violating any provision of the Federal or State Constitutions, select tenants of its own choice because of race, color, creed or religion... Clearly, housing accommodation is not a recognized civil right."

By this date, Metropolitan Life was building the Riverton Houses, a separate-but-equal housing project in Harlem with residents who were mainly Black. Some years later, the company admitted a few Black families to Stuyvesant Town and a few white families to Riverton. Both projects, however, remain largely segregated.

The fight to end the segregation of Stuyvesant Town continued after. The white residents formed the Village Tenants Committee to End Discrimination in Stuyvesant Town, and started subletting their apartments to Black Americans. Metlife attempted to evict the leaders of this committee in retaliation. 1,800 tenants were a part of the committee and, the groups survey found that 2/3rds of all tenant residents opposed the segregation policy. Lorch, one of the tenants subletting their place to a black family said of it, "Tenants here . . . will fight Jim Crow no matter what the Metropolitan tries to do." Eventually with public pressure, and the passage of the NY state Brown-Isaacs law, banning discrimination in publicly subsidized private housing in 1958, Metlife eventually marginally complied with the regulation. However it would be decades before the Brown-Isaacs law was enforced with any teeth and as such still remained largely segregated.

A host of other issues and controversies surrounded Stuyvesant Town's planning and design. From the outset, objections were made to the haste with which the project was approved and lack of public participation in the process; the project's population density; the absence of any public facilities such as schools, community centers, or shops in the development; the gated-community, private property character of the complex, and the denial of city residents of the right to walk through a part of the city that was once public; and violations of the city's master plan. Lawsuits were brought by property owners of the land, but in February 1944 the Supreme Court of the United States refused to review the constitutionality of the New York State law that enabled the development, despite the taking of public property for private profit, the granting of tax exemptions, and the public benefits advanced by the developers and their advocates.

The complex contained original plaques honoring Frederick H. Ecker and marking the complexes as housing for moderate-income families, which were dedicated during the complexes' opening day in 1947. In 2002, when the property became market rate housing, the plaques were removed.

=== Recent years ===
==== 2006 sale ====
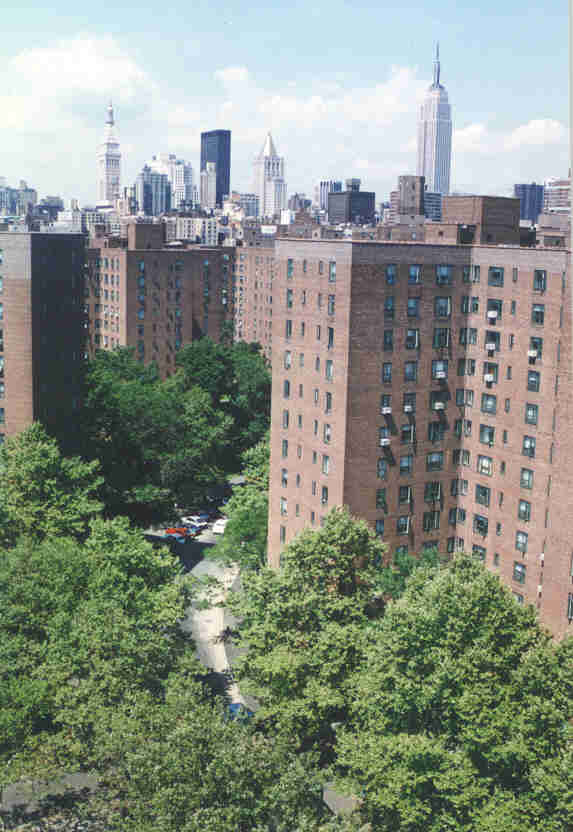
A view of central Manhattan from Stuyvesant Town

In October 2006, MetLife agreed to sell the complex to Tishman Speyer Properties and the real estate arm of BlackRock for $5.4 billion. The sale was expected to close by November 15, 2006, according to documents which CB Richard Ellis, a commercial real estate broker representing MetLife, sent to bidders. MetLife hired a broker, who started registering bidders, and intended to name a winner by November 2006. The sale had drawn interest from dozens of prospective buyers, including New York's top real estate families, pension funds, international investment banks and investors from Dubai, according to The New York Times, citing real estate executives.

New York City Council member Daniel Garodnick, a lifelong resident of Peter Cooper Village, attempted to organize tenants and investors to place a buyout bid on the complex. Initially, MetLife deemed the tenants group an unqualified bidder, but, after being pressured by elected officials, the company reversed its position, and distributed bid books to the tenant group; bids were to have been submitted by October 5, 2006. Bids included the tenants' $4.6 billion offer, a bid by Vornado Realty Trust, a joint offer between Lehman Brothers and The Related Companies, and one by Apollo Global Management which came within $100 million of Speyer's $5.4 billion. Tishman Speyer paid just $56 million in cash for the property while raising $4 billion in debt from Wachovia and another $500 million from Merrill.

In January 2007, a class action lawsuit was filed against MetLife, Tishman Speyer Properties, and their associates on behalf of the market rate tenants of Stuyvesant Town and Peter Cooper Village. The suit claimed that MetLife was improperly charging tenants "market rate" rents while at the same time receiving real estate tax benefits from the City of New York under the J-51 program, which requires property owners to maintain apartments as rent-stabilized during the period in which they are receiving benefits. The lawsuit asked for a monetary award of between $215 million and $320 million in rent overcharges and damages. Furthermore, it called for the market rate apartments to revert to rent stabilization until the expiration of the J-51 benefit period, sometime after 2017.

==== 2010 default ====
In January 2010, Tishman Speyer Properties defaulted on the mortgage, the largest commercial mortgage default in U.S. history; later that month, Tishman Speyer Properties gave up control of the properties by handing the complex to creditors, thereby avoiding a bankruptcy of the site. The default was predicted many months in advance; Fitch ratings downgraded the associated CMBS in August 2009. As of January 2010, the complex was estimated to be worth around $1.9 billion or less than 40 percent of the $5.4 billion the property was purchased for in 2006.

While the legal battle over rent stabilization played a small role in the demise, it is likely Tishman Speyer would have defaulted even had it won the case. The assumptions underlying the $5.4 billion 2006 valuation were extremely aggressive; the valuation assumed that the income from the properties would triple by 2011. The landmark sale and default are the subject of the 2013 book Other People's Money: Inside the Housing Crisis and the Demise of the Greatest Real Estate Deal Ever Made by New York Times real estate reporter Charles V. Bagli, who covered Stuyvesant Town for the newspaper.

==== 2015 sale ====
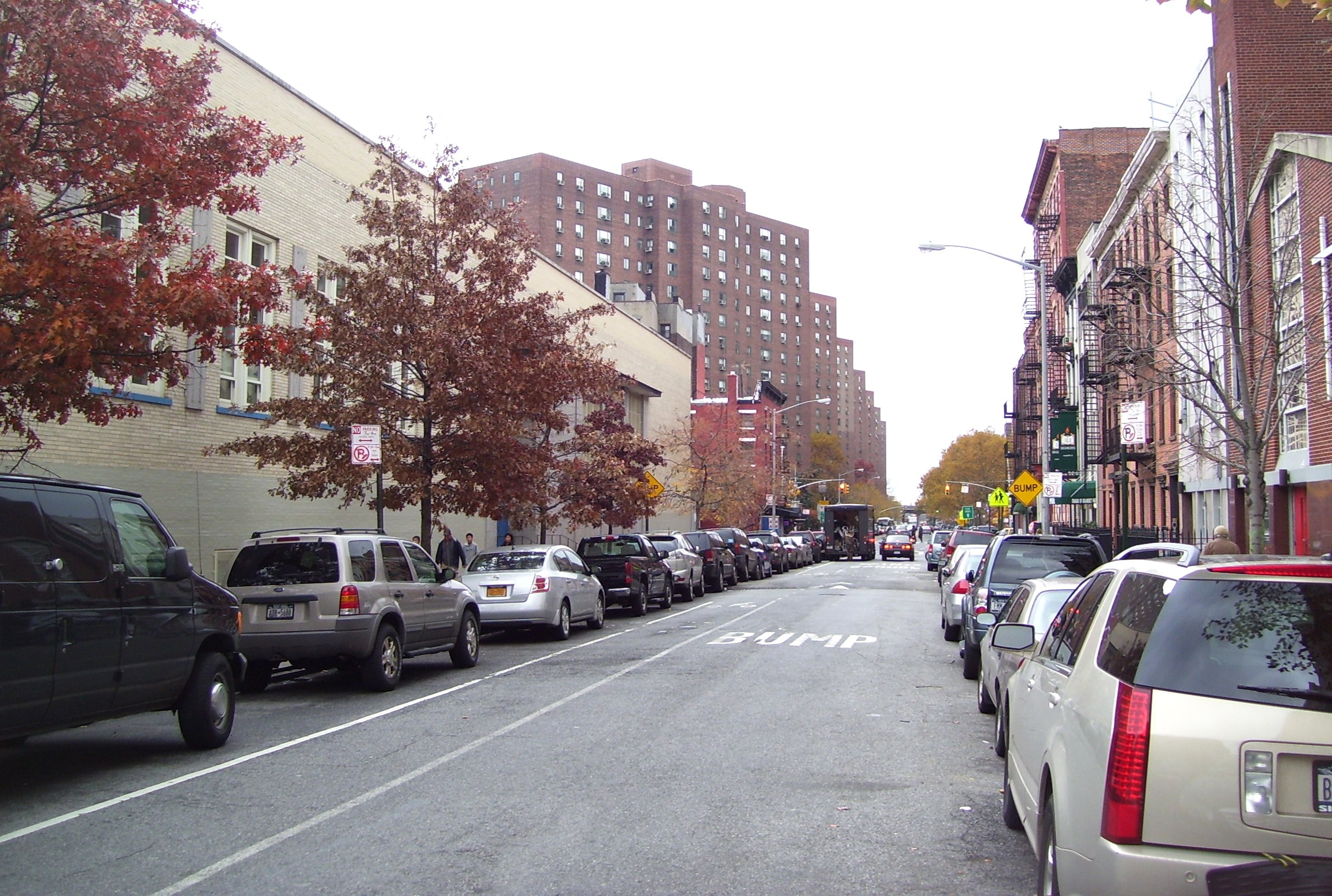
20th Street in 2010, looking east toward Peter Cooper Village. On the left is Simon Baruch Middle School (IS 104), built in 1954.

As of October 2015, the property was set to be sold to Blackstone Group LP and Ivanhoé Cambridge, the real-estate arm of pension-fund giant Caisse de dépôt et placement du Québec for about $5.3 billion. Blackstone had recently raised a $15.8 billion fund, the largest real-estate fund ever. New York City was expected to contribute $225 million to help preserve a portion of the complex as affordable to low- and middle-income residents. Under a binding agreement with the city, Blackstone agreed to keep roughly 5,000 units below market rents until at least 2035.

Most of those units would be aimed at what the developers and the city classify as "middle income" families: two-bedroom apartments, for example, would rent for about $3,200 a month, a rent considered affordable for a family of three making up to $128,000 a year, though the median household income in New York City as of the 2011–2015 American Community Survey was $53,373. About 500 units would be set aside for lower-income families, with two-bedroom units renting for up to $1,500 a month. The Federal National Mortgage Association would be providing Blackstone with a $2.7 billion loan through Wells Fargo Multifamily Capital, and the debt would have a term of 10 years.

The $5.45 billion sale was completed in December 2015. SL Green had threatened to file a lawsuit to block the sale, but was paid $10 million to drop its suit.

Growing rents and a gradual conversion of more rent-regulated units to market rates brought the net operating income of the property up each year from 2006 – 2015. At the end of 2015, about 45% of the complex's residents were paying regulated rents – down from 71% in 2006 – and income was above $200 million a year. As of January 2023, 6,200 units were rent regulated.

== Architecture ==
The complex is designed as two large "superblocks", independent of the grid system that characterizes the majority of Manhattan below 155th Street. It consists of two large parks, one for each part of the complex, juxtaposed with modern red brick apartment towers. Its design was heavily influenced by the modernist "Towers in the park" theory advocated by Swiss-French architect Le Corbusier in which residences consist of tall apartment buildings situated within a park-like environment.

Solar panels were installed atop Stuyvesant Town's towers in a project completed in 2019. They comprise the largest array of solar panels on an apartment complex in the United States.

== Demographics ==
Based on data from the 2020 United States census, the population of Stuyvesant Town/Peter Cooper Village was 22,512, an increase of 1,463 (7.0%) from the 21,049 counted in 2010. Covering an area of 132.9 acres (53.8 ha), the neighborhood had a population density of 169.4 inhabitants per acre (108,400/sq mi; 41,900/km^{2}). The racial makeup of the neighborhood was 65.6% (14,758) White, 3.1% (707) African American, 16.3% (3,661) Asian, 0.9% (210) from other races, and 5.2% (1,164) from two or more races. Hispanic or Latino of any race were 8.9% (2,012) of the population.

The entirety of Community District 6, which comprises Stuyvesant Town and East Midtown, had 53,120 inhabitants as of NYC Health's 2018 Community Health Profile, with an average life expectancy of 84.8 years. This is higher than the median life expectancy of 81.2 for all New York City neighborhoods. Most inhabitants are adults: a plurality (45%) are between the ages of 25 and 44, while 22% are aged between 45 and 64, and 13% are 65 or older. The ratio of youth and college-aged residents was lower, at 7% and 12% respectively.

In 2024, the median household income in Community Districts 5 & 6 was $160,386. The median income in Peter Cooper Village individually was $99,324, and the median income in Stuyvesant Town was $86,345. In 2018, an estimated 10% of Stuyvesant Town and East Midtown residents lived in poverty, compared to 14% in all of Manhattan and 20% in all of New York City. One in twenty-five residents (4%) were unemployed, compared to 7% in Manhattan and 9% in New York City. Rent burden, or the percentage of residents who have difficulty paying their rent, is 42% in Stuyvesant Town and East Midtown, compared to the boroughwide and citywide rates of 45% and 51% respectively. Based on this calculation, as of 2018, Stuyvesant Town and East Midtown are considered to be high-income relative to the rest of the city and not gentrifying.

== Police and crime ==
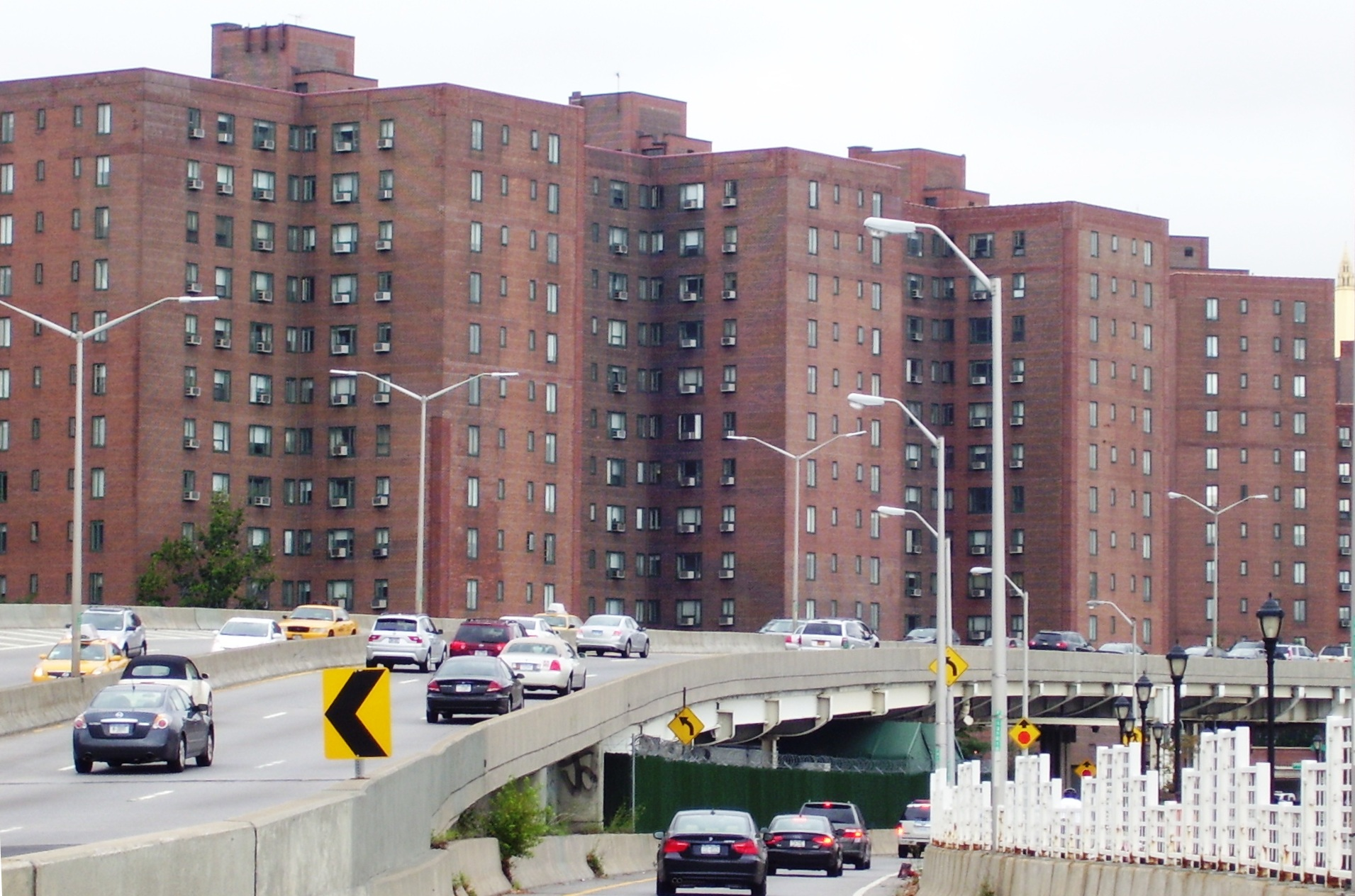
Stuyvesant Town as seen from Stuyvesant Cove Park on the East River; the FDR Drive is in the foreground.

Stuyvesant Town, along with Gramercy and Madison Square, is patrolled by the 13th Precinct of the NYPD, located at 230 East 21st Street. The 13th Precinct and neighboring 17th Precinct ranked 57th safest out of 69 patrol areas for per-capita crime in 2010. The high per-capita crime rate is attributed to the precincts' high number of property crimes. As of 2018, with a non-fatal assault rate of 35 per 100,000 people, Stuyvesant Town and East Midtown's rate of violent crimes per capita is less than that of the city as a whole. The incarceration rate of 180 per 100,000 people is lower than that of the city as a whole.

Within a three-month period in 1993–1994, there were three rapes in Stuyvesant Town. They were all carried out by the same perpetrator who left DNA evidence and who had already been convicted of rape in Florida, who had served time and was released a few months before the serial rapes began. It was argued by New York's commissioner of criminal justice, Richard Girgenti, that if New York and Florida had had DNA data banking and sharing laws, the second and third rapes would not have occurred. As a direct outcome of these cases, the New York state legislature adopted a DNA banking law in 1994.

The 13th Precinct has a lower crime rate than in the 1990s, with crimes across all categories having decreased by 80.7% between 1990 and 2018. The precinct reported 2 murders, 18 rapes, 152 robberies, 174 felony assaults, 195 burglaries, 1,376 grand larcenies, and 37 grand larcenies auto in 2018.

=== Security ===
The complex has its own public safety force of 40 officers. They are not permitted to carry firearms, as per New York State Law, but do carry batons, pepper spray, and handcuffs. As public safety officers they have limited enforcement powers on Cooper Village. They patrol the property in specialized vehicles.

In March 2009, security cameras were installed and activated in all Stuyvesant Town buildings. In addition, sensors were installed on the roof doors to prevent unauthorized access. There are over 1,200 surveillance cameras located throughout the complex, which are all connected to the Stuy Town security HQ in the Oval.

The requirement of photo ID card-keys was introduced in mid-October 2008 in Stuyvesant Town, and replaced door keys to each building's lobby. The parking garages along Avenue C, 20th Street, and 14th Street also implemented a key-card access system and installed security cameras.

The New York City Police Department is the primary policing and investigation agency within New York City as per the NYC Charter, which includes Stuyvesant Town–Peter Cooper Village.

== Fire safety ==
Stuyvesant Town is served by the New York City Fire Department (FDNY)'s Engine Co. 5 fire station, located at 340 East 14th Street.

== Health ==
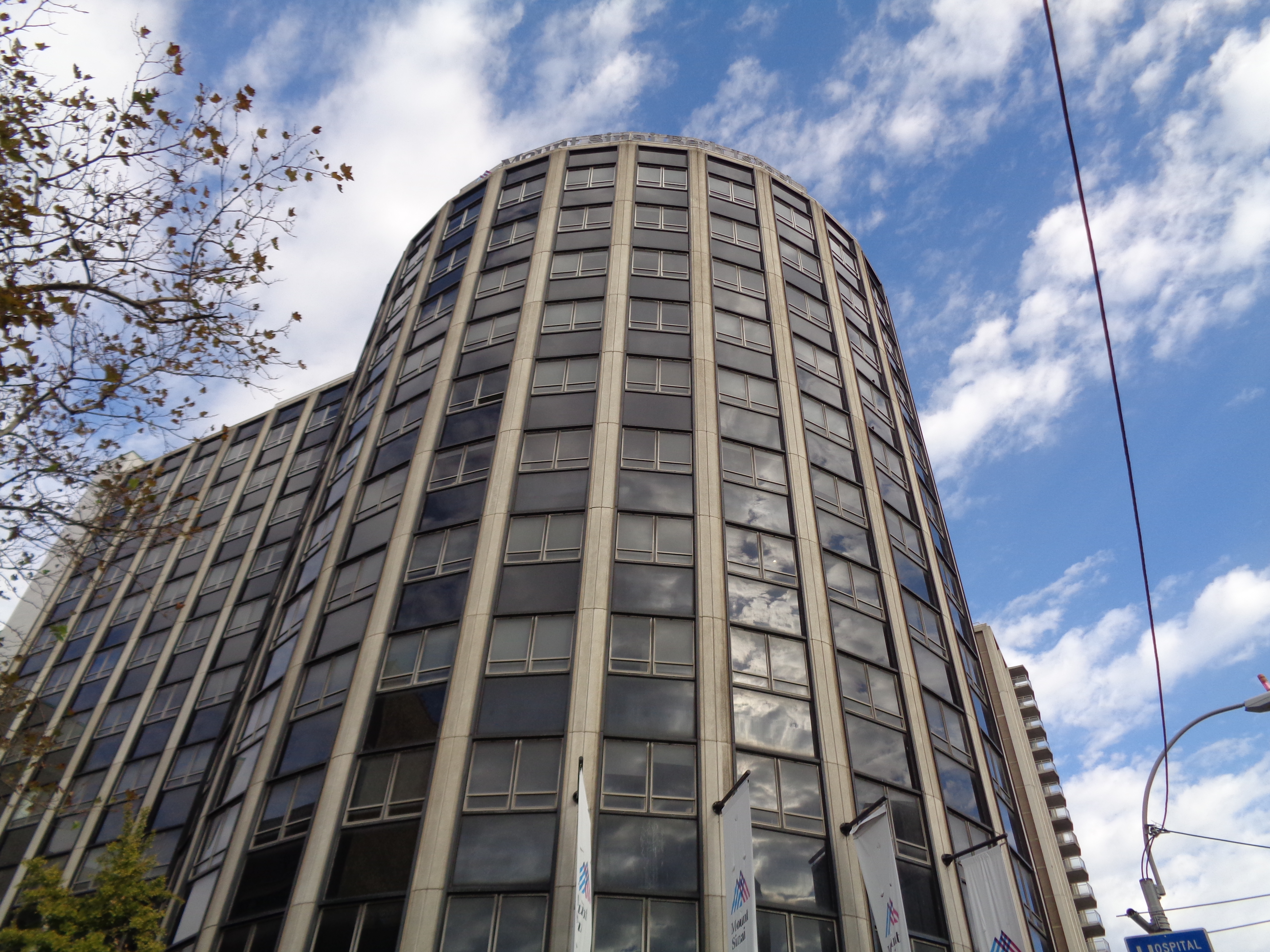
Mount Sinai Beth Israel (closed in April 2025)

As of 2018, preterm births and births to teenage mothers in Stuyvesant Town and East Midtown are lower than the city average. In Stuyvesant Town and East Midtown, there were 78 preterm births per 1,000 live births (compared to 87 per 1,000 citywide), and 1.5 births to teenage mothers per 1,000 live births (compared to 19.3 per 1,000 citywide), though the teenage birth rate was based on a small sample size. Stuyvesant Town and East Midtown have a low population of residents who are uninsured. In 2018, this population of uninsured residents was estimated to be 3%, less than the citywide rate of 12%, though this was based on a small sample size.

The concentration of fine particulate matter, the deadliest type of air pollutant, in Stuyvesant Town and East Midtown is 0.0102 milligrams per cubic metre (1.02×10^{−8} oz/ft^{3}), more than the city average. Twelve percent of Stuyvesant Town and East Midtown residents are smokers, which is less than the city average among residents of 14%. In Stuyvesant Town and East Midtown, 10% of residents are obese, 5% are diabetic, and 18% have high blood pressure—compared to the citywide averages of 24%, 11%, and 28% respectively. In addition, 7% of children are obese, compared to the citywide average of 20%.

Ninety-one percent of residents eat some fruits and vegetables every day, which is higher than the city's average of 87%. In 2018, 90% of residents described their health as "good", "very good", or "excellent", more than the city's average of 78%. For every supermarket in Stuyvesant Town and East Midtown, there are seven bodegas.

Beth Israel Medical Center (closed 2025) was located in Stuyvesant Town. The Bellevue Hospital Center and NYU Langone Medical Center are located in Kips Bay.

== Post office and ZIP Codes ==
Stuyvesant Town and Peter Cooper Village are located in three ZIP Codes. The area south of 20th Street and in Stuyvesant Town is located in 10009, while the area north of 20th Street and in Peter Cooper Village is located in 10010. Several buildings on First Avenue are located in 10003, the ZIP Code for the East Village. The United States Postal Service operates the Peter Stuyvesant Station post office at 335 East 14th Street.

== Education ==
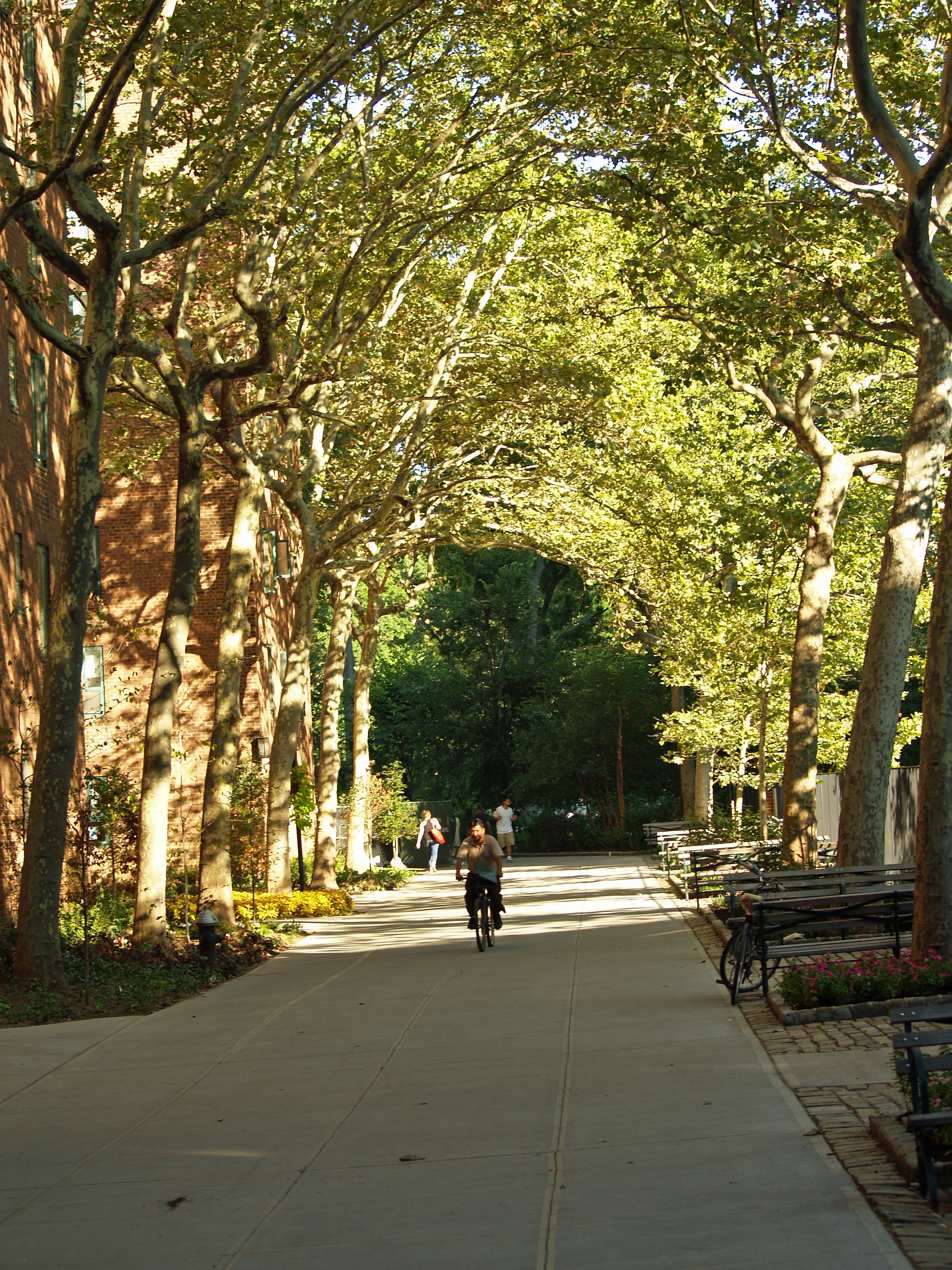
A tree-lined path through Stuyvesant Town in August 2008

Stuyvesant Town and East Midtown generally have a higher rate of college-educated residents than the rest of the city as of 2018. A majority of residents age 25 and older (82%) have a college education or higher, while 3% have less than a high school education and 15% are high school graduates or have some college education. By contrast, 64% of Manhattan residents and 43% of city residents have a college education or higher. The percentage of Stuyvesant Town and East Midtown students excelling in math rose from 61% in 2000 to 80% in 2011, and reading achievement increased from 66% to 68% during the same time period.

Stuyvesant Town and East Midtown's rate of elementary school student absenteeism is lower than the rest of New York City. In Stuyvesant Town and East Midtown, 8% of elementary school students missed twenty or more days per school year, less than the citywide average of 20%. Additionally, 91% of high school students in Stuyvesant Town and East Midtown graduate on time, more than the citywide average of 75%.

=== Schools ===
The New York City Department of Education operates the following public elementary schools near Stuyvesant Town–Peter Cooper Village:

- PS 19 Asher Levy (grades PK-5)
- PS 34 Franklin D Roosevelt (grades PK-8)
- PS 40 Augustus St.-Gaudens (grades PK-5)
- PS 226 (grades PK-2, 4–8, 10–11)
- The Children's Workshop School (grades PK-5)

The following public middle and high schools are located near Stuyvesant Town–Peter Cooper Village:

- JHS 104 Simon Baruch (grades 6–8)
- MS 255 Salk School of Science (grades 6–8)
- High School for Health Professions and Human Services (grades 9–12)
- Institute for Collaborative Education (grades 6–12)
- Manhattan Comprehensive Night and Day High School (grades 10–12)

The following independent school is located near Stuyvesant Town–Peter Cooper Village:

- United Nations International School (Grades Pre-K-12)

=== Library ===
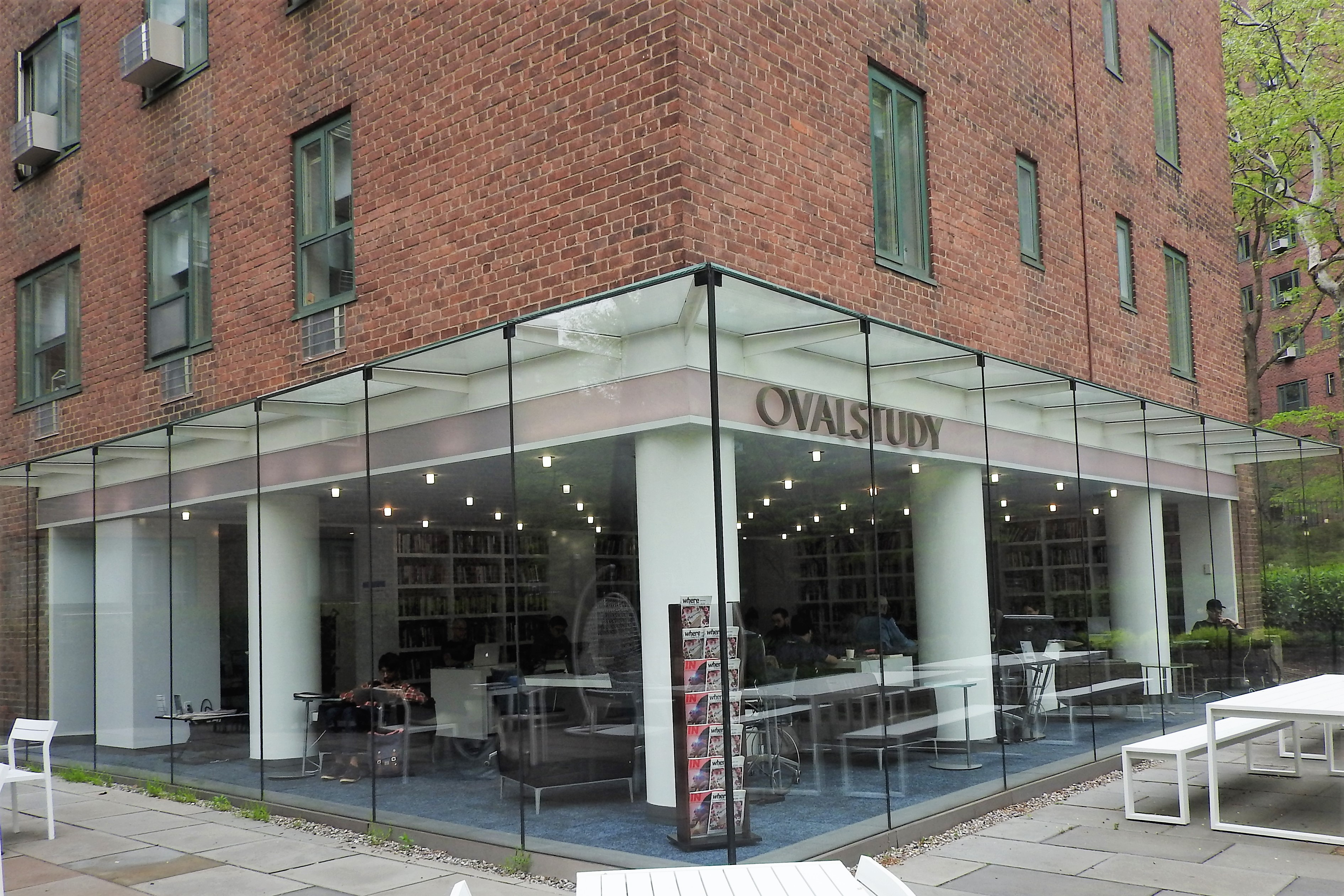
Oval Study, a coworking space with books

There are no library branches in Stuyvesant Town–Peter Cooper Village. The nearest library is the New York Public Library (NYPL)'s Epiphany branch, at 228 East 23rd Street in Gramercy/Kips Bay.

== Town & Village newspaper ==
The community has its own newspaper, Town & Village, also known as "the T&V". It was first published in 1947 and has been published every week since, covering news in Stuyvesant Town, Peter Cooper Village, Waterside Plaza, and Gramercy Park. The paper was founded by Charles G. Hagedorn and as of the late 2000s (decade) is published by Hagedorn Communications. Town & Village is independent and not affiliated with the ownership of the complex.

== Notable residents ==
- David Axelrod (born 1955), political consultant
- David Brooks (born 1961), political columnist for The New York Times
- Chris Burke (born 1965), actor
- Mary Higgins Clark (1927–2020), mystery writer
- Paul Compitus (born 1966), British fashion designer
- Daniel Garodnick (born 1972), New York City Councilman
- Alexis Glick (born 1972), news anchor
- Michael Higgins (1920–2008), actor
- Keith Hufnagel (1974–2020), professional skateboarder and founder of HUF.
- Rachel Jacobs (1975–2015), social entrepreneur
- John Lindsay (1921–2000), local U.S. Representative, Mayor of New York City
- William Lombardy (1937–2017), International Grandmaster of chess
- Lee Lorch (1915–2014), mathematician and an early civil rights activist
- Frank McCourt (1930–2009), Pulitzer Prize-winning author
- Drew Nieporent – restaurateur
- Paul Reiser (born 1956), comedian and actor
- Robert Siegel (born 1947), All Things Considered news show host on National Public Radio

== In popular culture ==
- Peter Cooper Village is the setting for Aldo Ray and Judy Holliday's characters' new home in the 1952 comedy-drama The Marrying Kind, with exterior shots filmed in both Stuyvesant Town and Peter Cooper Village.
- The Barbers' apartment in Three Days of the Condor is in Peter Cooper Village.
- Humphrey Bogart's character Eddie Willis in the 1956 boxing noir, The Harder They Fall—his final film appearance—lives at 8 Peter Cooper Road.
- The opening shots in Delbert Mann's The Bachelor Party (1956) are of Stuyvesant Town, which provides the location for the apartment of Charlie (Don Murray) & Helen (Kathleen Maguire).
- The village is seen from above during the prologue to the 1961 film of West Side Story.
- Stuyvesant Town is the setting for Apartment, a 2020 novel by Teddy Wayne.
- Stuyvesant Town and Peter Cooper Village appeared in a 1957 episode of the TV show Decoy.

== See also ==
- Ballymun Flats, Dublin
- Broadwater Farm, London
- Co-op City, Bronx
- Cooperative Village
- LeFrak City
- Marcus Garvey Village
- Mitchell Lama
- Park La Brea, Los Angeles
- Parkchester, Bronx
- Parkfairfax, Virginia
- Parkmerced, San Francisco
- Penn South
- Red Road Flats, Glasgow
- Riverton Houses
- Rochdale Village, Queens
- Starrett City, Brooklyn
- Towers in the park
