= Rochdale Village, Queens =

Housing cooperative in New York City

Coordinates: 40.676°N 73.774°W

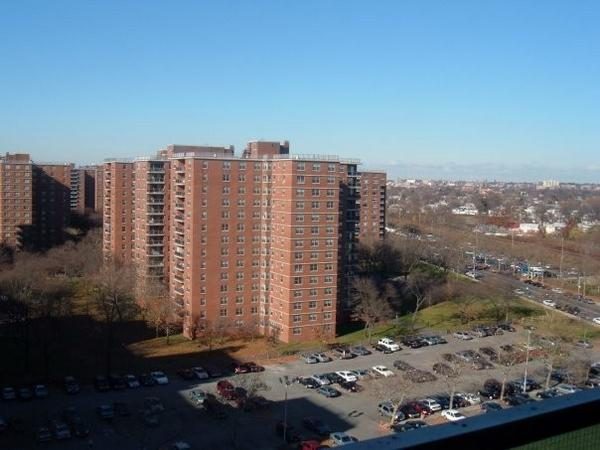
View of the Rochdale Village Housing Complex

Map of Rochdale

Rochdale Village (pronounced /ˈrɑːtʃ.deɪl/) is a housing cooperative in the southeastern corner of the New York City borough of Queens. Located in Community District 12, Rochdale Village is grouped as part of Greater Jamaica, corresponding to the former Town of Jamaica. It is adjacent to four other Queens neighborhoods: St. Albans to the east, South Jamaica to the west, Locust Manor to the north, and Springfield Gardens to the south across the Belt Parkway. Rochdale is about 2 miles (3.2 km) from the Queens/Nassau border and about 1 mile (1.6 km) north of John F. Kennedy International Airport.

== History ==
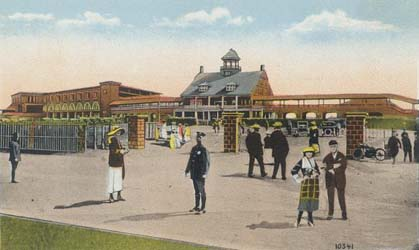
Jamaica Race Course, c. 1907

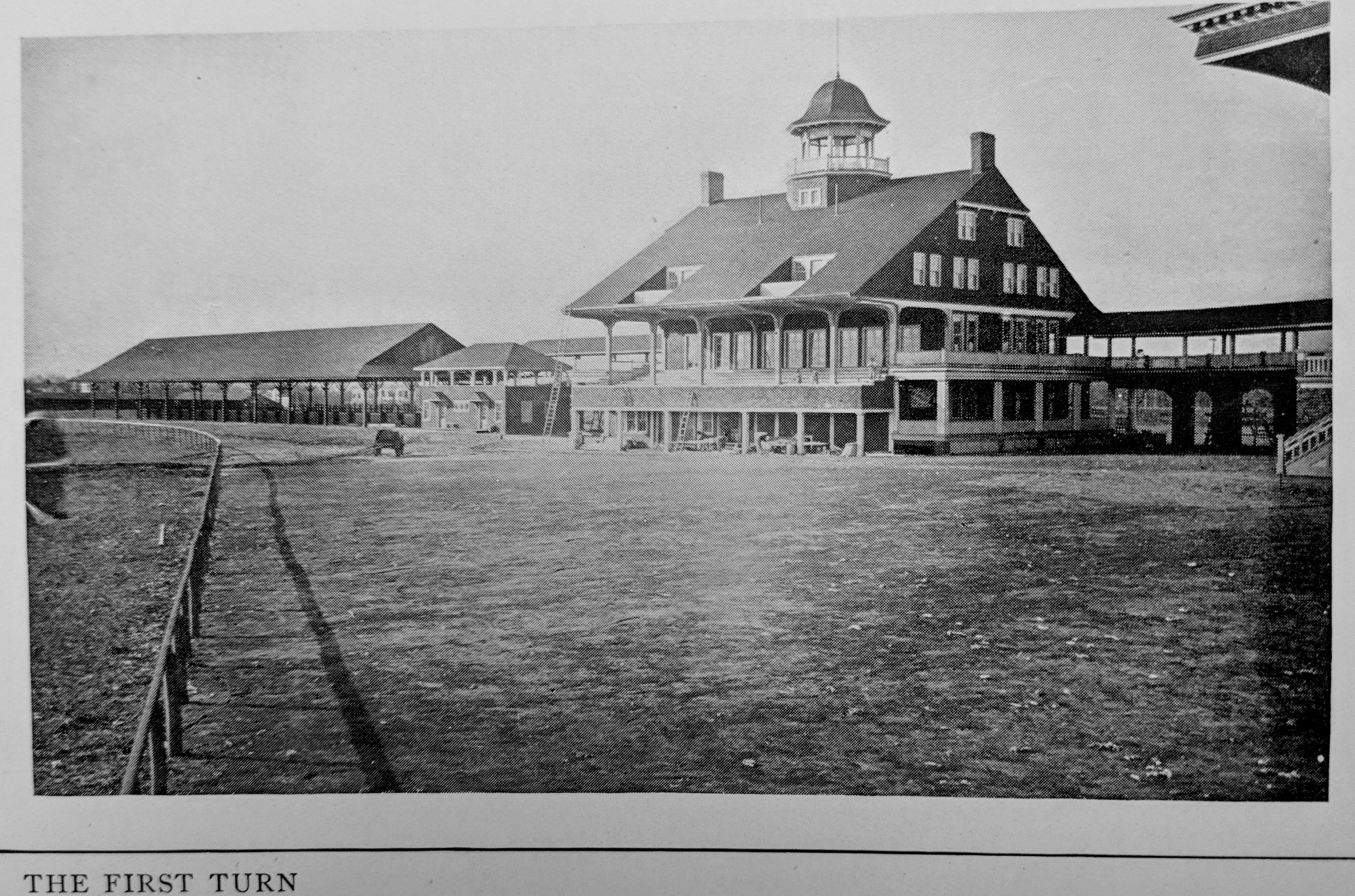
Jamaica Racecourse, as seen in a 1903 brochure

Rochdale Village was named after the English town of Rochdale, Lancashire (now Greater Manchester), where the Rochdale Pioneers developed the Rochdale Principles of cooperation. The architect's concept of Rochdale Village was an attractive community covering 122 blocks that would provide the residents with a park-like setting and facilities of suburbia, within the limits of the Urban Jamaica Area. Rochdale Village was designed to be a "city within a city" when it was planned beginning in 1939, in order to boost tourism to the surrounding area also including Springfield Gardens, Rosedale, and Laurelton.

The property is the former site of Jamaica Race Course, which was the area's only tourist site and was operated by the Metropolitan Jockey Club and its successor, the Greater New York Association (now the New York Racing Association.) When the NYRA decided to renovate Greater Jamaica's other track, Aqueduct Racetrack (in South Ozone Park), it also decided to close Jamaica Race Course when the Aqueduct Racetrack's improvements were finished. Jamaica Race Course was shut down in 1959 and demolished. Rochdale Village was developed under the Mitchell-Lama Housing Program to provide affordable housing for low- and middle-income families. The architect, Herman Jessor, was inspired by the Le Corbusier model. Construction soon proceeded at a rapid pace on the new community in Queens. Allegations of racial discrimination by labor unions involved in Rochdale Village's construction were documented in the 1963 program Confronted broadcast on National Educational Television. When Rochdale Village opened, it was the largest private cooperative housing complex in the world until Co-op City in the Bronx was completed in 1971.

Rochdale Village was originally between 10 and 20 percent African American and 80 to 90 percent white. This caused controversy before the start of construction, as black people could not participate in Rochdale Village's construction. The Rochdale Village complex was supposed to be the model for mixed-race housing in the U.S., but then became symbolic of the Civil Rights Movement, which was ongoing during the complex's construction; for instance, twenty-three protesters were detained for disrupting the construction in 1961, including William Booth, the future head of mayor John V. Lindsay's Human Rights Commission. About 10% of the units were given to blacks upon the complex's 1963 completion. As the years passed, more and more African Americans moved to Rochdale. It was between the late 1960s and mid-1970s that most white people moved from the community, owing to the white flight brought on by white perceptions of black people as dangerous, fears of lowered property value, and racist real estate practices such as block-busting. Soon, the complex became poorer and unable to provide for some basic utilities throughout the early 1980s, with many apartments remaining empty.

However, toward the end of the 20th century, Rochdale Village became 100 percent owner-occupied in order to eliminate rent-stabilized apartments. This was concurrent with the drop in crime citywide. A New York Times article in 1997 went: "Under new management, Rochdale has become a preferred residence for middle-class black people. There are only nine vacancies." There are about 25,000 residents in Rochdale Village as of 2008.

== Facilities ==
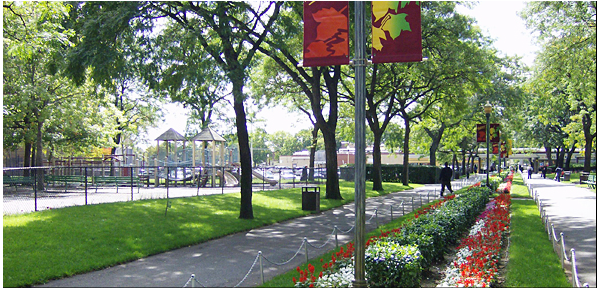
Manicured lawns and pathways around Rochdale

Rochdale Village, sometimes called the "Jewel of Jamaica", is located on a 120-acre (0.49 km^{2}) residential park. It consists of 20 buildings in five circular groups. Each 13 story building has three sections: A, B, and C. Each section in each building has its own mailing address. Rochdale Village has its own branch of the Queens Public Library system. A 21 megawatt cogeneration facility generates all the electrical power, heating, air-conditioning, and domestic hot water services for the entire residential development and two shopping malls; the power plant produces its power independently with no connection to any outside utility company. Rochdale Village Department of Public Safety protects the residents, visitors, and property of Rochdale Village.

The New York City Police Department's 113th Precinct patrol Rochdale Village and is the primary Policing and investigation agency within the New York City as per the NYC Charter (law), this includes Rochdale Village.

== Education ==
The schools in the Rochdale Village are P.S. 354, P.S. 80, Catherine and Count Basie Junior High School 72, August Martin High School, and CCS Montessori. In 2011, P.S. 30 began being phased out and replaced after years of poor performance; a new school, P.S. 354, opened with kindergarten and first grade, adding a grade per year until P.S. 30 phased out in June 2014.

== Transportation ==
Rochdale Village and the surrounding neighborhoods are served by transit via the Long Island Rail Road's Atlantic Branch, which stops right by the complex at the Locust Manor station. Rochdale is also served by MTA Regional Bus Operations' Q3, Q5, Q85, Q86, Q87, Q89, Q111, Q113, Q114, Q115, QM21 and QM65 routes. A New York City Subway extension to the neighborhood was considered in the 1970s as part of the Program for Action, but was cut short at Jamaica Center – Parsons/Archer due to financial issues.

== See also ==
- Cooperative Village
- Co-op City
- Marcus Garvey Village
- Mitchell Lama
- Parkchester, Bronx
- Parkfairfax, Virginia
- Park La Brea, Los Angeles, California
- Parkmerced, San Francisco, California
- Penn South
- Riverton Houses
- Stuyvesant Town–Peter Cooper Village
