= Riverton Houses =

Complex of residential buildings

Coordinates: 40°48′46.8″N 73°56′9.6″W

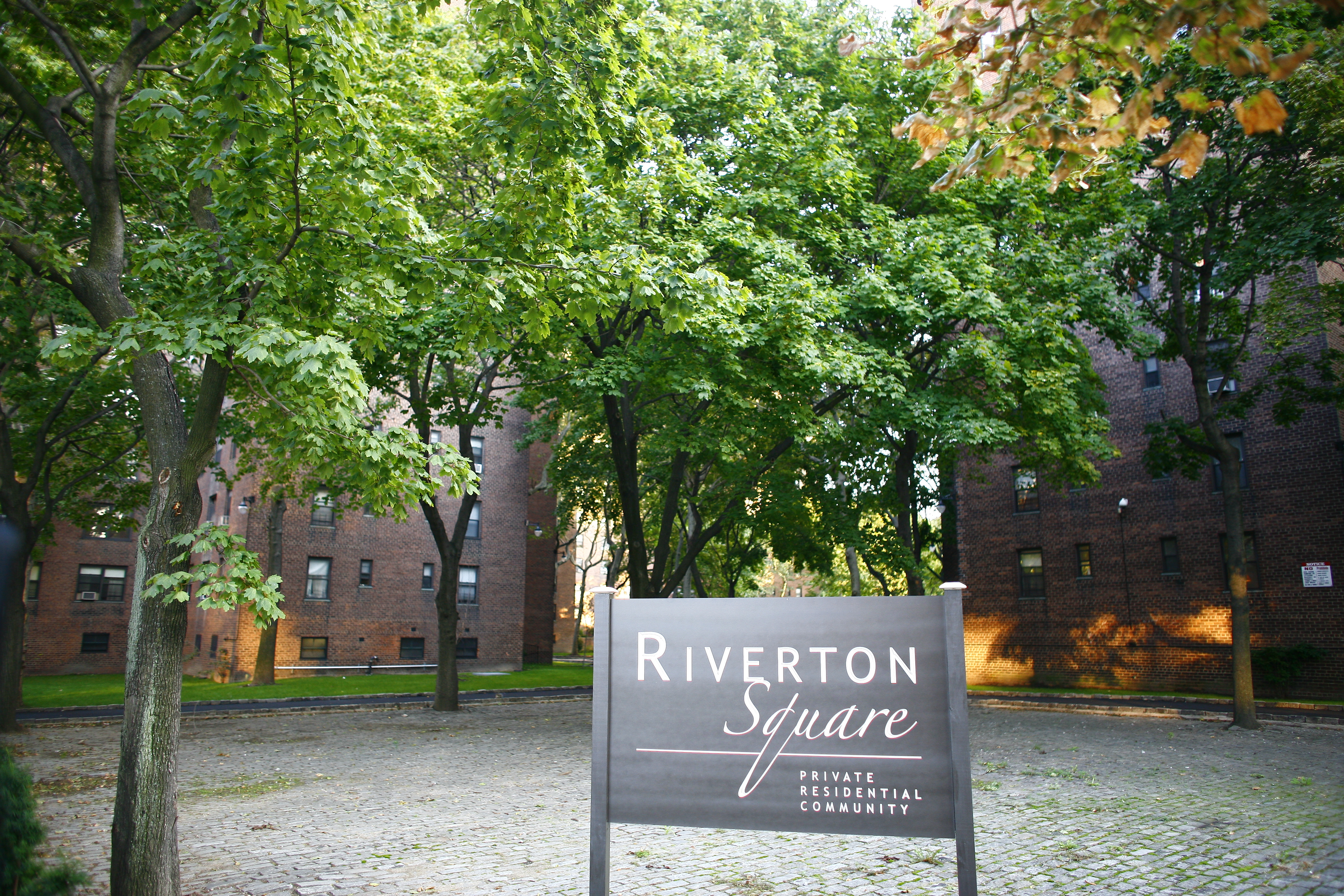
Courtyard of the Riverton Houses.

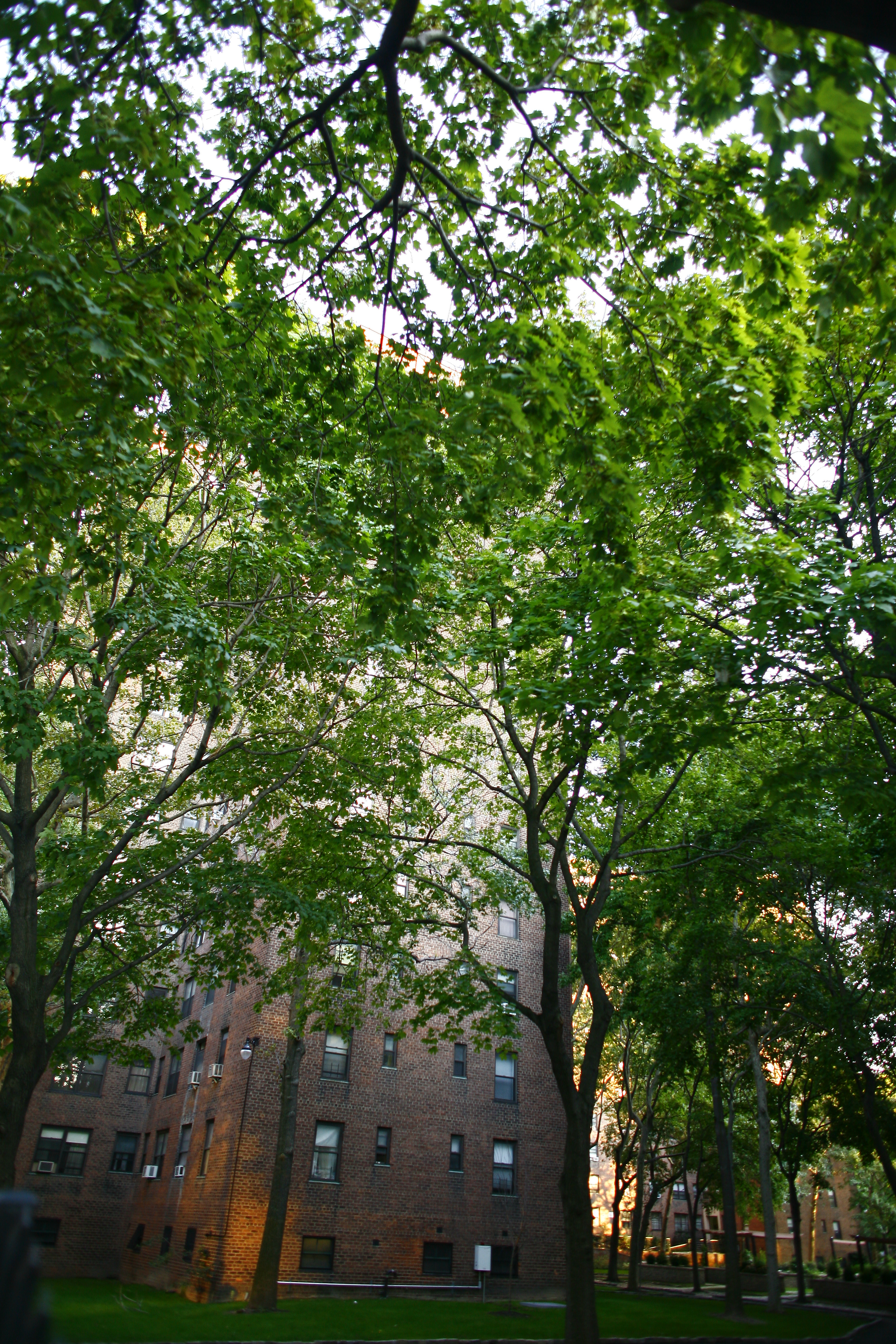
Riverton Houses

The Riverton Houses is a large (originally 1,232 unit) residential development in Harlem, Manhattan, New York City.

== Ownership ==
The project was proposed by the Metropolitan Life Insurance Company in 1944, and largely served an African American population, in contrast to Met Life's Parkchester in the Bronx (1940), Stuyvesant Town–Peter Cooper Village in Manhattan, Park La Brea in Los Angeles, Parkmerced in San Francisco, and Parkfairfax in Alexandria, Virginia, which were restricted to a whites-only tenancy at the time of their construction. The development consists of seven 13-story buildings situated on a 12-acre (49,000 m^{2}) site located between 135th Street and 138th Street, and Fifth Avenue and the Harlem River. Some of the units on upper floors had views into the Polo Grounds.

In August 2008, Laurence Gluck's Stellar Management LLC notified its mortgage servicer that it anticipated defaulting on the property's $225 million mortgage within a month, since it was unable to convert half of the property's 1,230 rent-stabilized apartments to market rate; Stellar had owned the property from 2005. CWCapital won control of the complex in an auction held March 11, 2010, and began operating it through Rose Associates Inc. As of mid-2013, Riverton Houses was managed by CompassRock Real Estate. A&E Real Estate Holdings purchased the development for $201 million in 2016.

== Notable residents ==
- New York State Assemblyman Keith L. T. Wright (former)
- Mayor David Dinkins (former)
- Jazz pianist Billy Taylor

== See also ==
- MetLife
- Co-op City, Bronx
- Cooperative Village
- LeFrak City
- Mitchell Lama
- Marcus Garvey Village
- Parkchester, Bronx
- Parkfairfax, Virginia
- Parkmerced, San Francisco
- Park La Brea, Los Angeles
- Penn South
- Rochdale Village, Queens
- Southbridge Towers
- Starrett City, Brooklyn
- Stuyvesant Town–Peter Cooper Village
