= Park La Brea, Los Angeles =

Park La Brea
- Neighborhood of Los Angeles
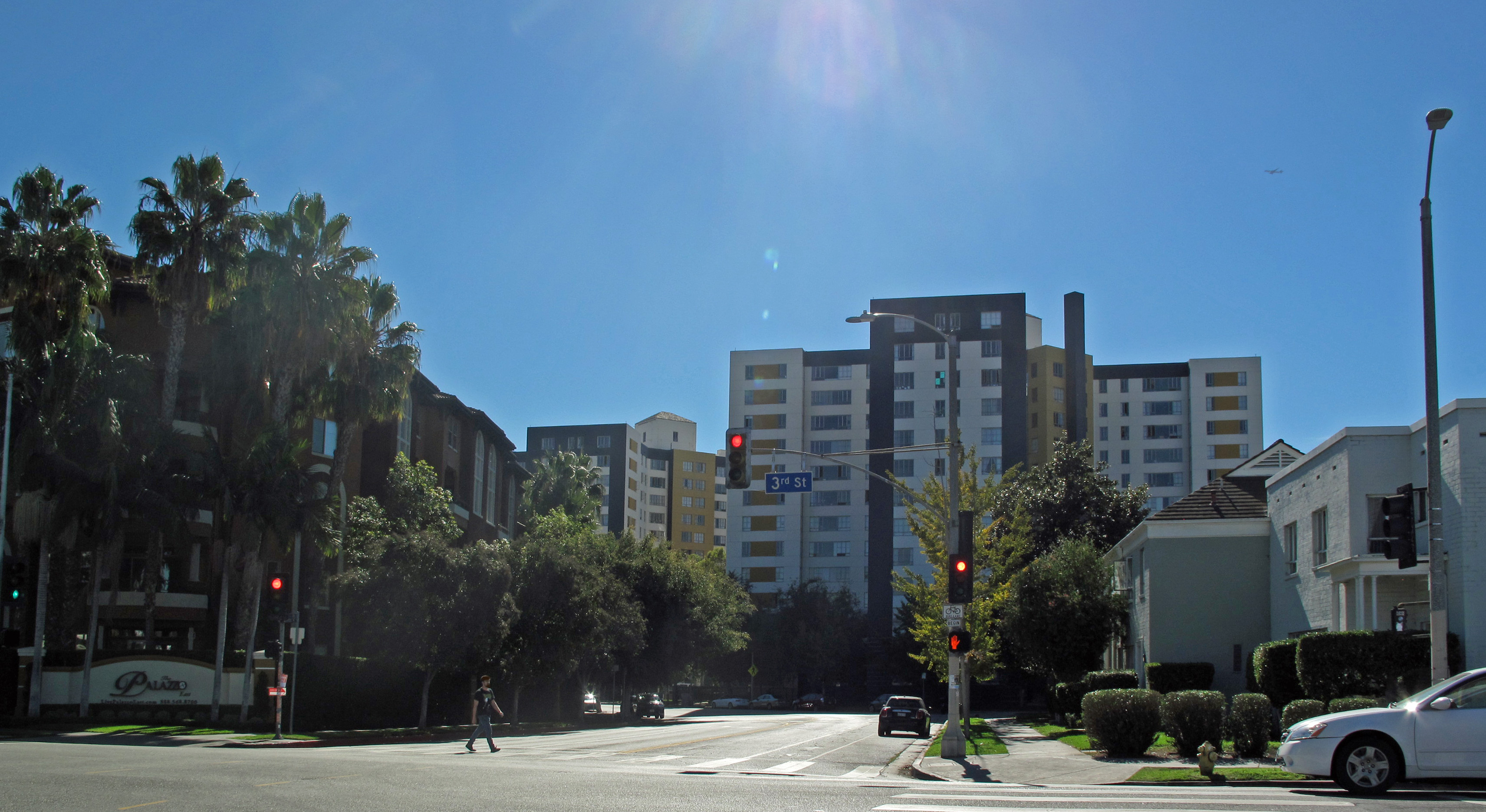
- Two types of housing at Park La Brea

- Location within Western Los Angeles
- Coordinates: 34.06583°N 118.35417°W
- Country: United States
- State: California
- County: Los Angeles
- City: Los Angeles
- Time zone: UTC−8 (PST)
  - Summer (DST): UTC−7 (PDT)

Park La Brea (Spanish: La Brea—"The tar", after the nearby La Brea Tar Pits) is an apartment community in the Miracle Mile District of Los Angeles, California developed by the Metropolitan Life Insurance Company in 1944.

Work started in 1941, initially featuring thirty-one two-story buildings with 2,600 apartments, in 1950 eighteen 13-story towers were added. resulting in 4,255 units and is among the largest apartment complexes in the continental United States. It sits on 160 acres (0.65 km^{2}) of land.

== Geography and transportation ==
Park La Brea is bounded by 3rd Street on the north, Cochran Avenue on the east, 6th Street on the south, and Fairfax Avenue on the west. The complex is notable for its octagonal street layout, with many internal thoroughfares at a 45° angle of displacement relative to the surrounding city street grid.

In May 2026, the Wilshire/Fairfax station on the D Line subway line opened at the intersection of Wilshire Boulevard and Fairfax Avenue. The stop is approximately a 5-minute walk from Park La Brea, allowing the residents of the dense apartment complex to be connected to Downtown Los Angeles by rapid transit. When fully built, the D Line will reach UCLA and the Westwood neighborhood by 2028.

== The neighborhood ==
After the arrival of the Spanish in the 1780s, most of the area that is now Park La Brea became part of the Rancho La Brea land grant, and remained largely devoted to agriculture and petroleum production well into the 20th century. The growth of Hollywood and the Miracle Mile made the adjacent areas desirable centers for residential development in the 1920s, but the mid-rise apartment towers that give the district its current name were built later, between 1944 and 1948.

As the towers are relatively isolated from the rest of the Miracle Mile — set far back from major thoroughfares in a nod to Le Corbusier, they developed a reputation as "the projects", since they are reminiscent of such notorious housing developments as Chicago's Robert Taylor Homes and New York's Queensbridge.

== Design ==
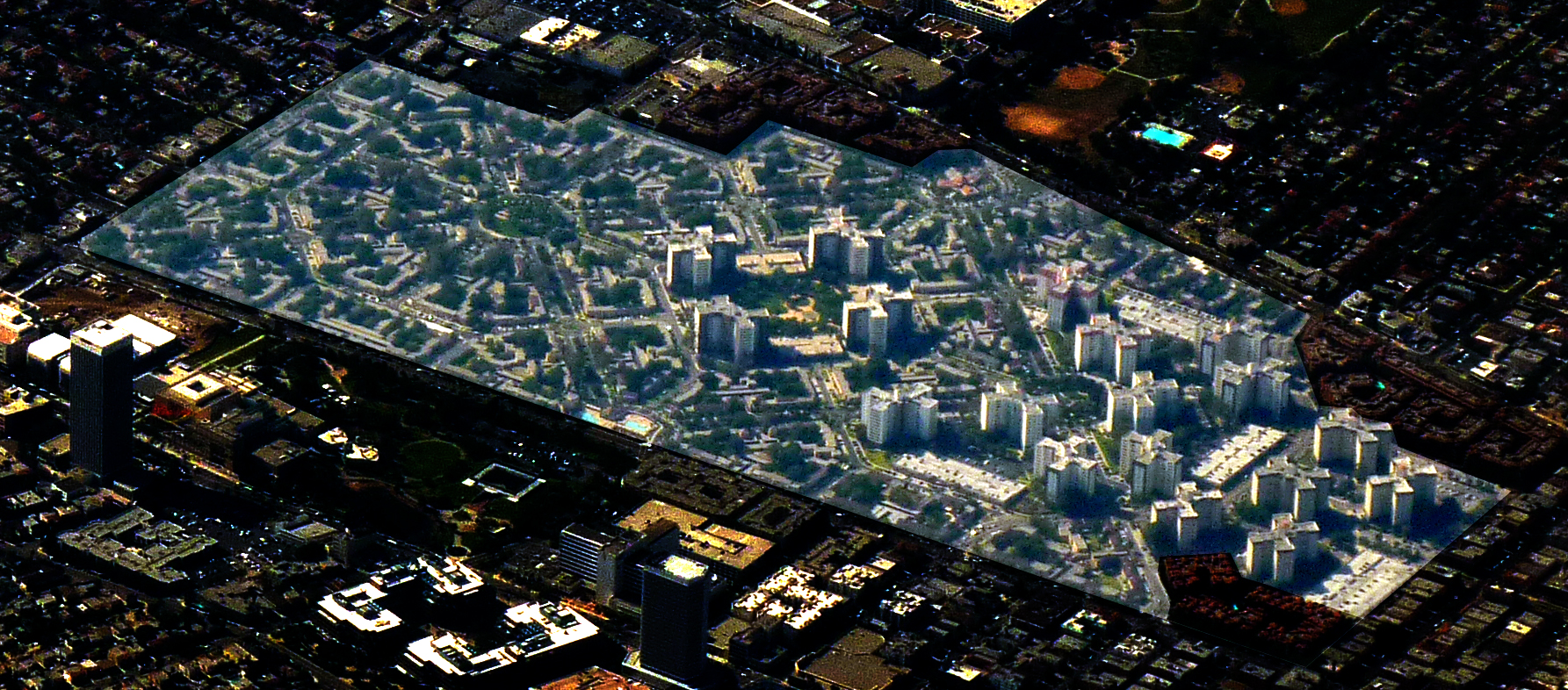
Aerial view highlighting the massive Park La Brea complex

The Park La Brea townhouses were designed by Leonard Schultze & Associates (New York) with associate architect Earl T. Heitschmidt in 1941. The architecture has been dubbed Modern Colonial in form. The landscape design was undertaken by Tommy Thomson.

== Ownership ==
The project was created by Metropolitan Life with the purchase of 176 acres from the University of Southern California along the northern margin of Hancock Park. They owned it until 1985 when it was sold to Forest City Enterprises of Cleveland, and it sold again in 1995 to Prime Residential, part of Prime Group.

== Education ==
Residents are zoned to schools in the Los Angeles Unified School District.

Three different elementary schools serve portions of this neighborhood:

- Carthay Center Elementary School
- Hancock Park Elementary School
- Wilshire Crest Elementary School

All of the neighborhood is zoned to John Burroughs Middle School and Fairfax High School.

== See also ==
- Co-op City
- Cooperative Village
- Mitchell Lama
- Parkchester, Bronx
- Parkfairfax, Virginia
- Parkmerced, San Francisco
- Penn South
- Riverton Houses
- Rochdale Village, Queens
- Stuyvesant Town–Peter Cooper Village
