= Parkmerced, San Francisco =

Apartment complex in the California city

Coordinates: 37.718353°N 122.479234°W

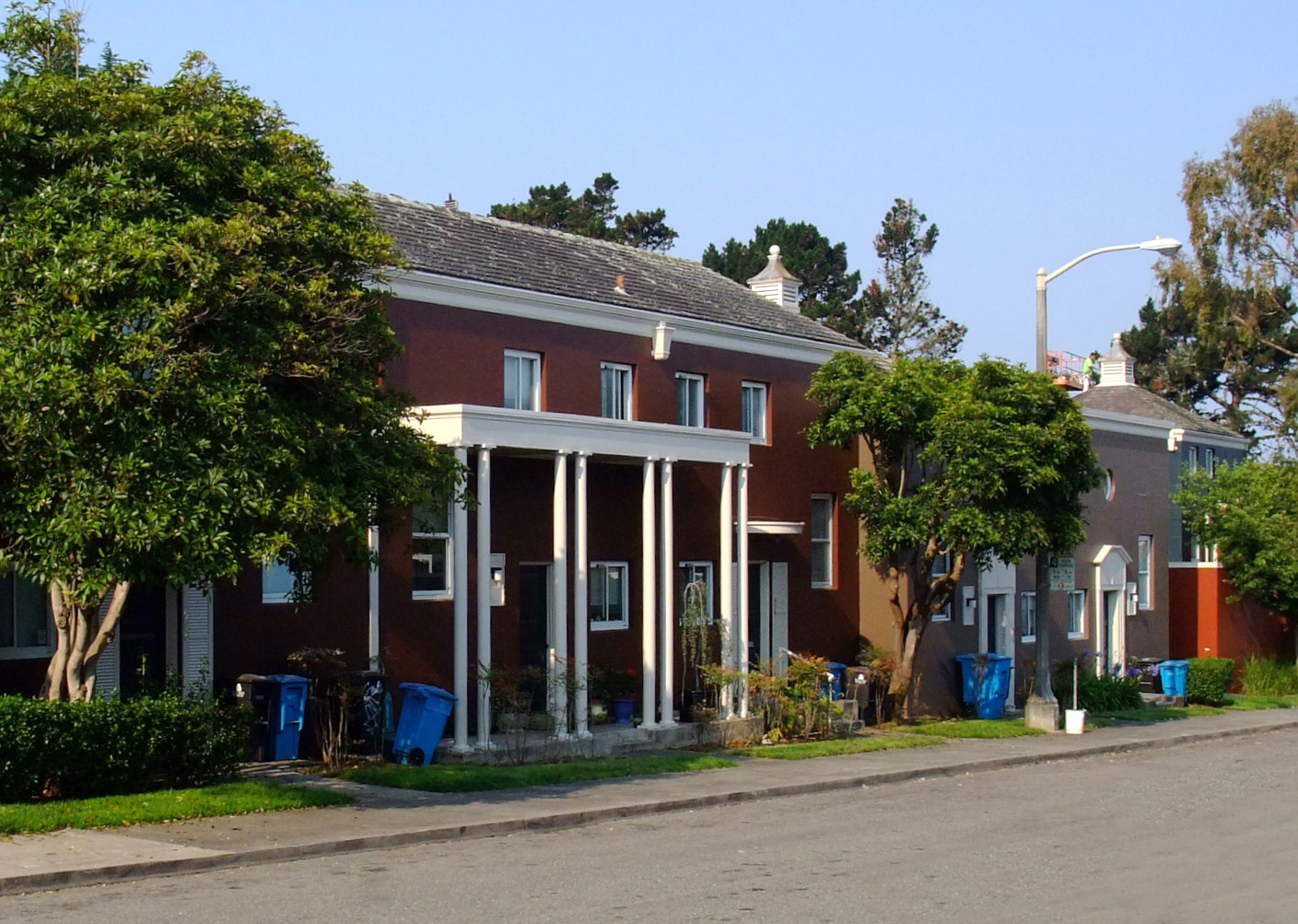
Vidal Drive, part of the Parkmerced neighborhood

Parkmerced is a neighborhood located on the West Side of San Francisco, California. It was designed by architects Leonard Schultze and Thomas Dolliver Church in the early 1940s. Parkmerced is the second-largest single-owner neighborhood of apartment blocks west of the Mississippi River after Park La Brea in Los Angeles. It was a planned neighborhood of high-rise apartment towers and low-rise garden apartments in southwestern San Francisco for middle-income tenants.

Parkmerced contains 3,221 residences (after sale of five blocks to San Francisco State University (SFSU) and over 9,000 residents, and is one of four remaining privately owned large-scale garden apartment complexes in the United States. The complex is located south of SFSU, west of 19th Avenue, and east of Lake Merced and the Harding Park Golf Club. The far western boundary of the neighborhood extends to Lake Merced Boulevard, and the neighborhood is popular with students and faculty at San Francisco State University because of its proximity.

In October 2005, the property was sold to a joint venture between Stellar Management and Rockpoint Group from a JP Morgan Chase and Carmel Partners joint venture entity, for approximately $687,000,000.

After defaulting on 1.8 billion Dollars in Loans, the property was ordered into receivership in March of 2025, with Douglas Wilson Companies acting as receiver and San Francisco based property managers Brick + Timber taking over operations.

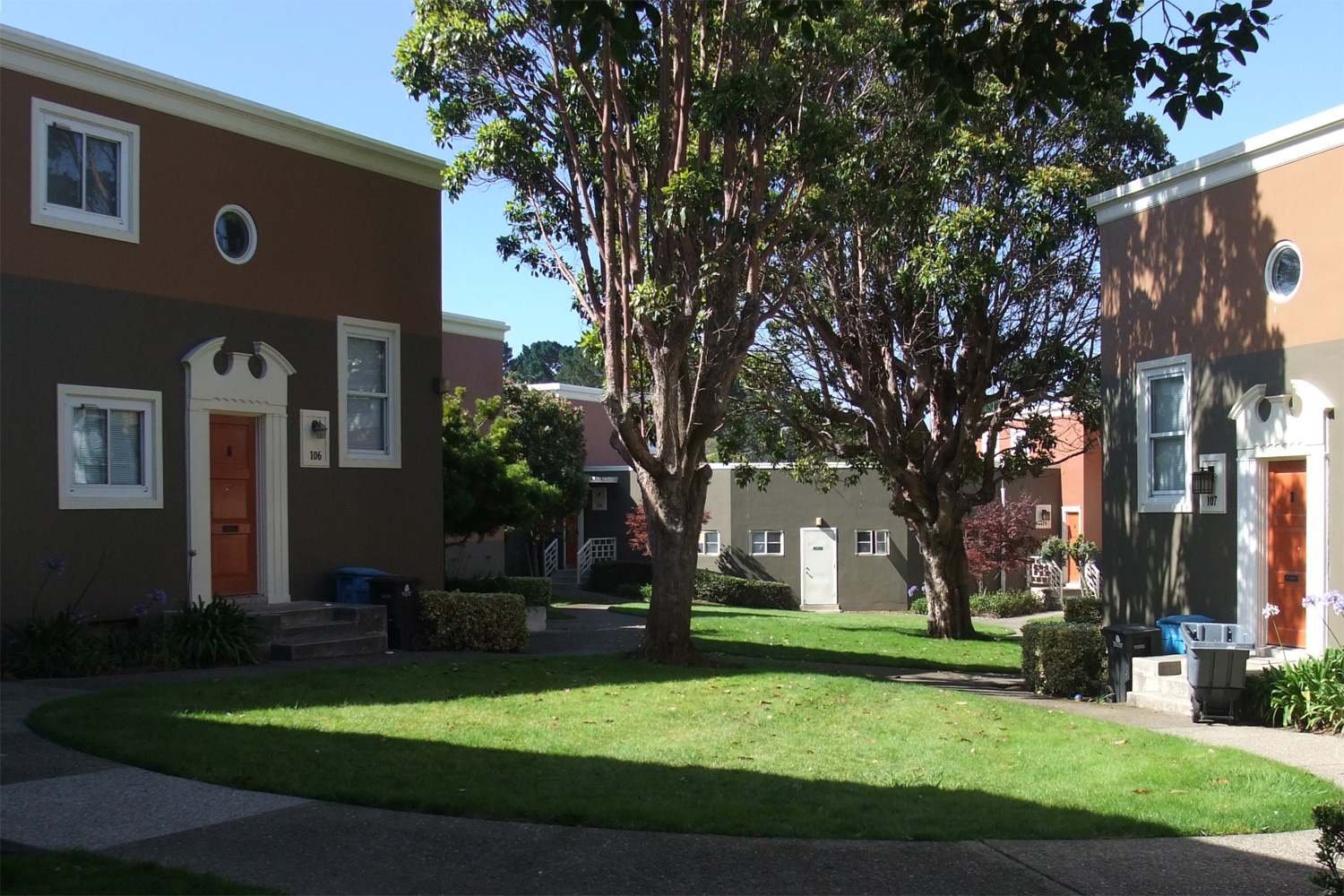
One of Parkmerced's numerous unique courtyards

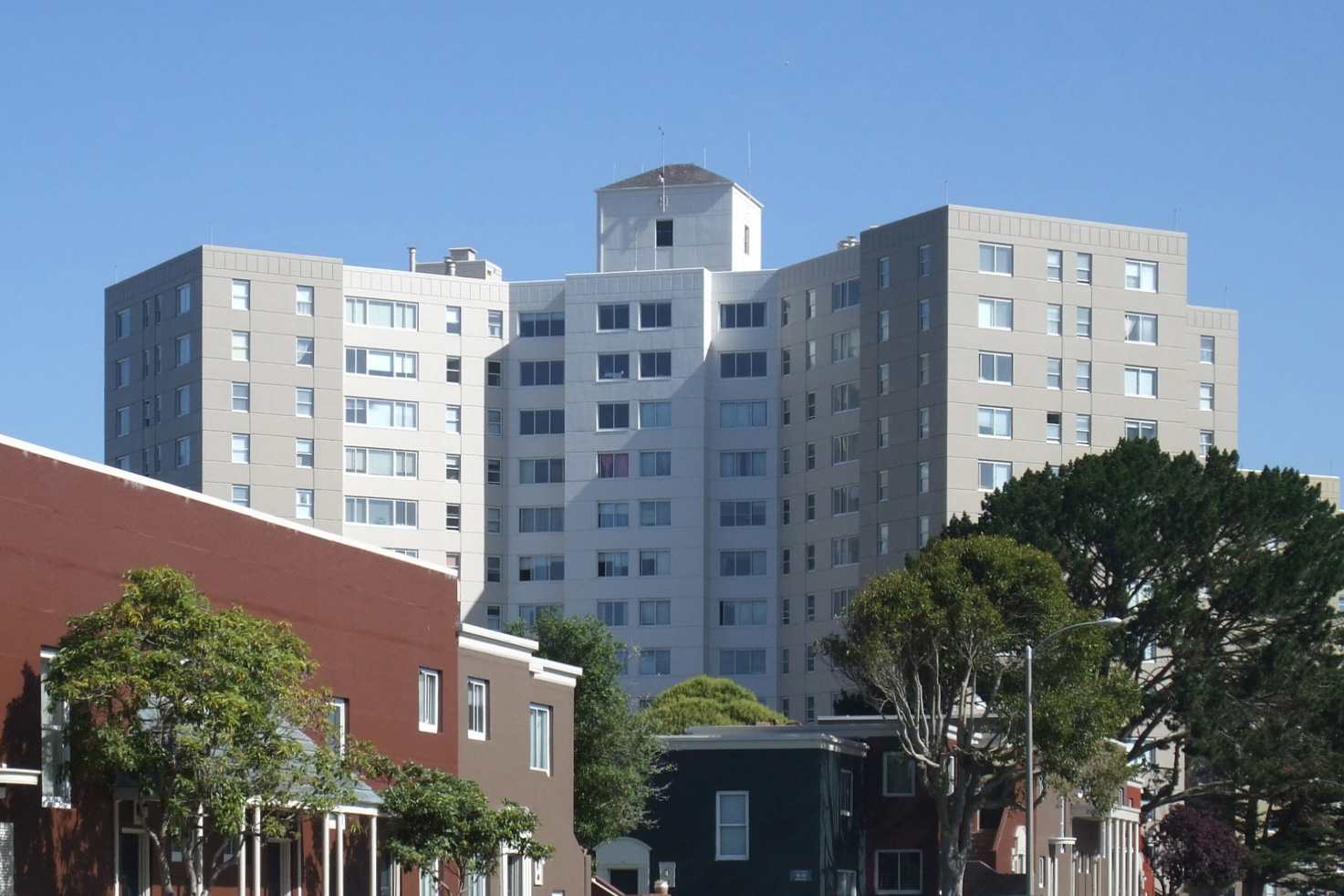
Parkmerced also has several high-rise apartment towers.

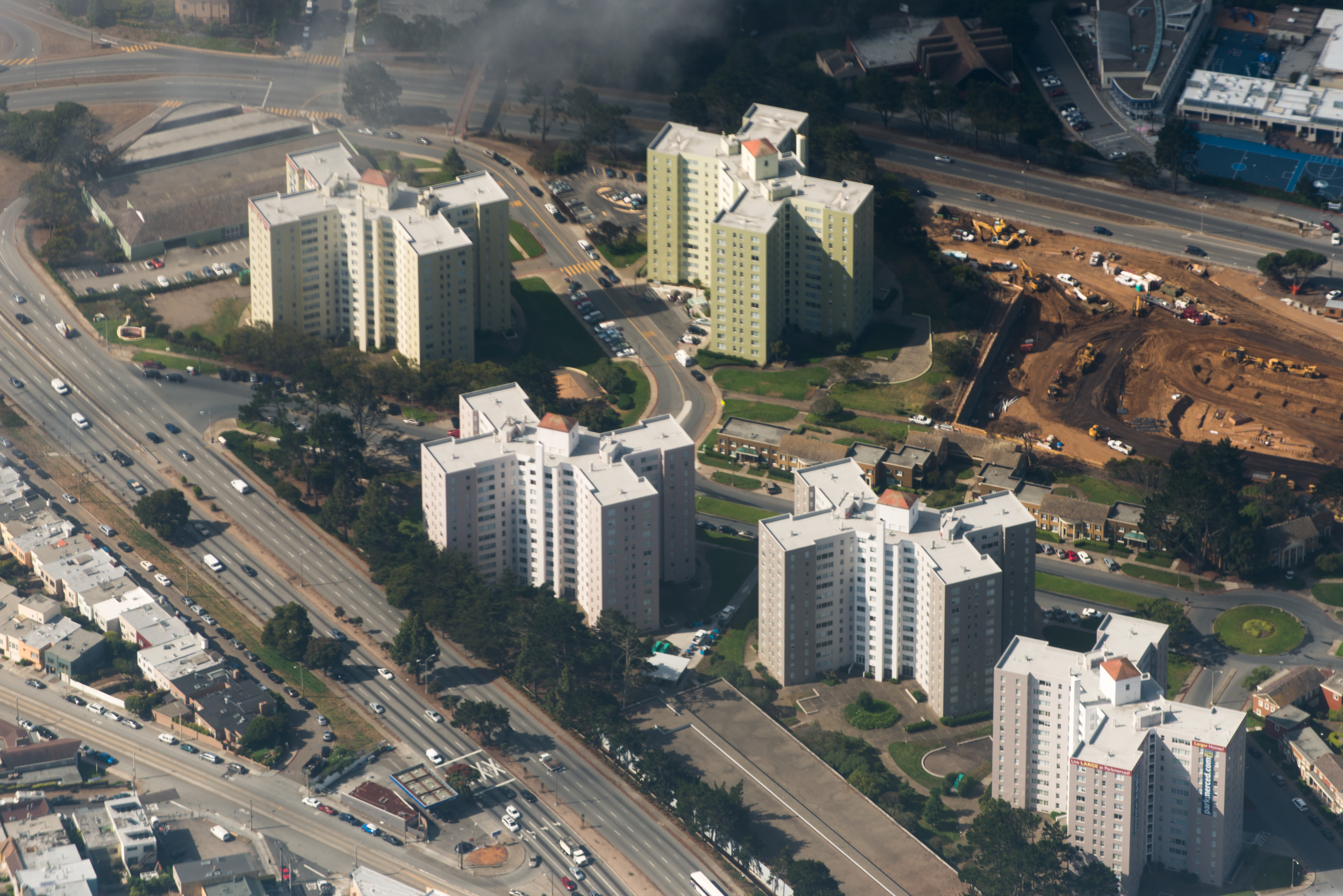
Aerial view of several Parkmerced high-rise apartment buildings, showing their distinctive shape

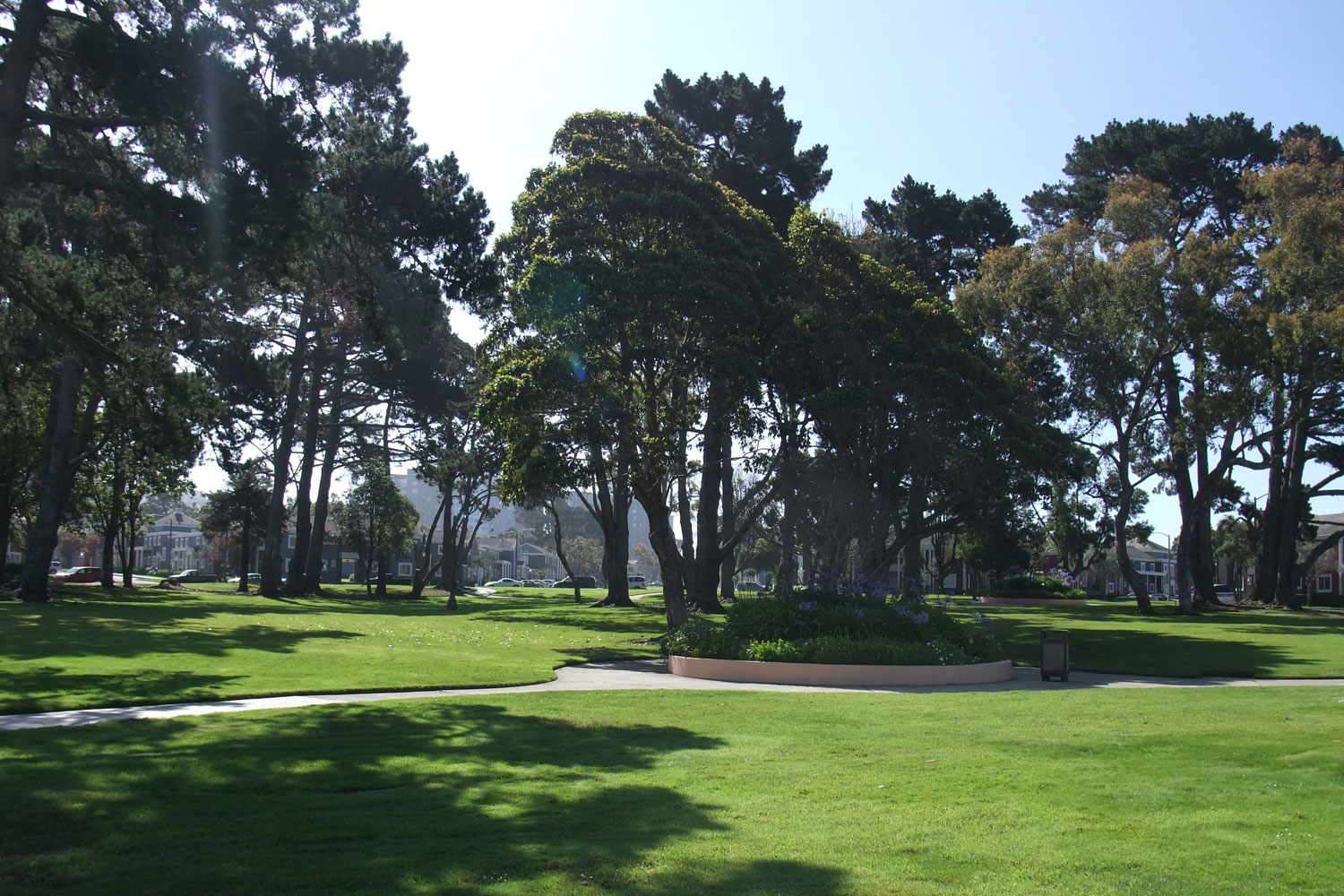
The Parkmerced Common, bounded by Juan Bautista Circle

== Design and history ==
The apartment towers were designed by Leonard Schultze and Associates, the post-War successor firm to Schultze and Weaver, in partnership with prominent landscape architect Thomas Dolliver Church. The development was built by the Metropolitan Life Insurance Company, after their success with the Parkchester development in New York City. Development started in the 1939, but was slowed due to World War II. The first tenants moved into the Font Boulevard buildings in early 1944. The development was completed in the early 1950s and was a first home to many military families returning from the Second World War and the Korean War. Metropolitan Life has built similar apartment blocks in other large cities, including Park La Brea in Los Angeles, Parkfairfax in Virginia, and Riverton Houses, Parkchester, and Stuyvesant Town—Peter Cooper Village in Manhattan to name a few.

Parkmerced’s unusual pie-shaped blocks were designed by its architect, Leonard Schultze, and shares many features with his Park La Brea design. Schultze worked closely with landscape architect Thomas Dolliver Church, who often collaborated with cutting-edge, Modern architects, to refine the plan for Parkmerced. Church developed a unifying concept for the landscaping of each individually designed and graded garden courtyard, the different street types, open spaces such as Robert Pender Park in Juan Bautista Circle [dedicated May 3, 2009], the Meadow and the recreation area, aided by office intern Robert Royston.

MetLife owned and carefully maintained the property until early 1970s, when it sold it to Leona Helmsley and the property began to deteriorate. There were a succession of owners and management companies beginning in the late 1990s. The commercial areas of the development were sold off to investors, and other parts sold to the California State University system for San Francisco State University. As of 2008, 116 of the original 150 acres (0.61 km^{2}) are owned and maintained by a single investor, who purchased the property for $687 million and has committed $110 million in upgrades. During the early 2000s (decade) the property was marketed as The Villas Parkmerced, however, as of 2009, signage and advertisements have returned to the original Parkmerced name.

== Transportation ==
Bus service through Parkmerced primarily is provided by the San Francisco Municipal Railway 57 Parkmerced route. Additionally, the 18, 28, 28R and 29 bus routes, as well as the Muni Metro M Ocean View light-rail line, operate along nearby 19th Avenue.

== Ongoing construction and development plans ==
Parkmerced is in the middle of reconstruction. Current projects include replacing old elevators, remodeling entrances to the towers, applying wooden window frames and miscellaneous detailing to the garden townhomes, modifying landscaping, providing new mailbox units, as well as painting the outsides of all the buildings through 2009. Parkmerced acquired their own Saturday morning Farmer's Market, which takes place on the western meadow of the neighborhood.

Along with aesthetic changes being made to the public spaces in the neighborhood, vacant garden and tower apartments are also seeing heavy renovations. These include new stainless steel appliances, granite marble counter tops, laminate flooring, and wooden cabinets. An emphasis by the development team is on the sustainability.

In 2010, the owners and managers of the various parts of Parkmerced proposed a major redevelopment, which would involve phased demolition of the deteriorating garden apartments in favor of higher density replacements, and reconfiguring some streets. In May 2011, the San Francisco Board of Supervisors voted 6–5 to approve this redevelopment plan, including the replacement of virtually all of the low-rise garden apartment units with new mid-rise structures. In addition, the plan calls for preserving the rent-controlled status of tenants who are relocated, and involves construction of several hundred new units, some of which will be rentals, while others will be made available for sale. Plans also calls for retail, grocery store, performance center, and the re-routing of the M Oceanview metro line into Parkmerced. As of February 2023, no construction has begun towards the redevelopment.

The updated plan for Parkmerced is developed by Skidmore, Owings and Merrill.

== Criticism ==
The complex was the subject of significant controversy over the policies of a previous owner regarding rent control and deceptive pricing. Apartments were alleged to have been offered at low prices because of a significant discount offered at lease signing. Upon expiration of the initial lease, rents could be raised by the maximum percentage allowed under San Francisco rent control laws, but calculating from the initial, not discounted, rent, leading in some cases to rental increases of 28%. The complex was sued in a class action lawsuit that was settled out of court. The current owners Parkmerced Investors, LLC, were not sued over this issue.

In 2025, Parkmerced faced renewed criticism over safety and property management issues. Residents alleged ongoing problems with crime, poor maintenance, and inadequate responses from management. At one apartment tower on Cambon Drive, tenants reported suspected prostitution activity and frequent entry of nonresidents, raising concerns about building security. Some residents also described a broader pattern of neglect, including unresolved complaints and deteriorating living conditions.

== See also ==
- MetLife
- Cooperative Village
- Co-op City
- Mitchell Lama
- Parkchester, Bronx
- Parkfairfax, Virginia
- Park La Brea, Los Angeles, California
- Penn South
- Riverton Houses
- Rochdale Village, Queens
- Stuyvesant Town–Peter Cooper Village
