= Parkfairfax, Virginia =

- Parkfairfax Historic District
- U.S. National Register of Historic Places
- U.S. Historic district
- Virginia Landmarks Register
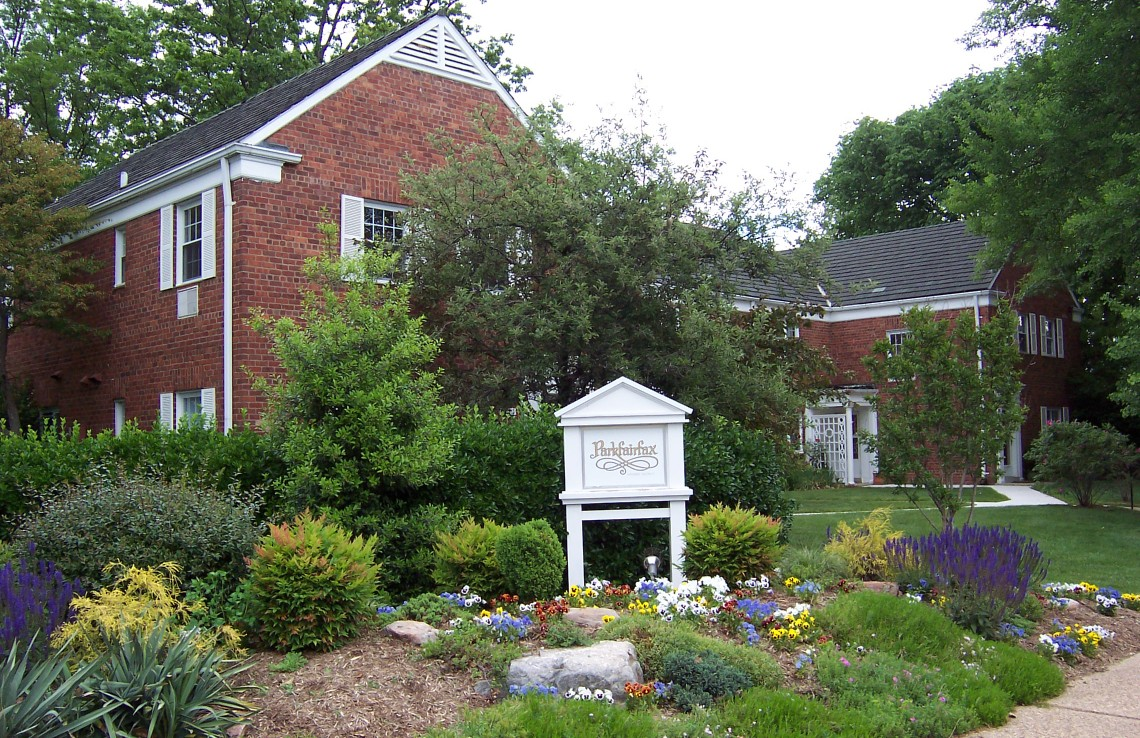
- Preston Road entrance to Parkfairfax

- Location within Alexandria
- Location: Bounded by Quaker Ln., US 395, Beverley Dr., Wellington Rd., Gunston Rd., Valley Dr., Glebe Rd., and Four-mile Run, Alexandria, Virginia
- Coordinates: 38°50′12″N 77°4′48″W
- Area: 132 acres (53 ha)
- Built: 1941
- Architect: Schultz, Leonard and Associates; Clarke, G.D., and Rapuano, Michael
- Architectural style: Colonial Revival
- NRHP reference No.: 99000146
- VLR No.: 100-0151

Significant dates
- Added to NRHP: February 22, 1999
- Designated VLR: December 10, 1998

Parkfairfax is a neighborhood in Alexandria, Virginia, located in the northwestern part of the city near the boundary with Arlington County. Nearby thoroughfares are Interstate 395 (Shirley Highway), State Route 402 (Quaker Lane), and West Glebe Road.

The neighborhood consists of 1,684 townhouse-type condominium apartments in more than 200 buildings on 132 acres (53 ha) built in 1941 and 1942 by Metropolitan Life Insurance Company of New York at the request of U.S. President Franklin Roosevelt to provide housing near the new Pentagon. Like the neighboring Arlington County neighborhood of Fairlington, Parkfairfax is listed on both the National Register of Historic Places and on the Virginia Landmarks Register.

The name is similar to those of other Metropolitan Life projects that use a local area name preceded by "park" (e.g., Parkchester, Parklabrea, and Parkmerced) despite the area not having been a part of Fairfax County since 1801.

== History ==
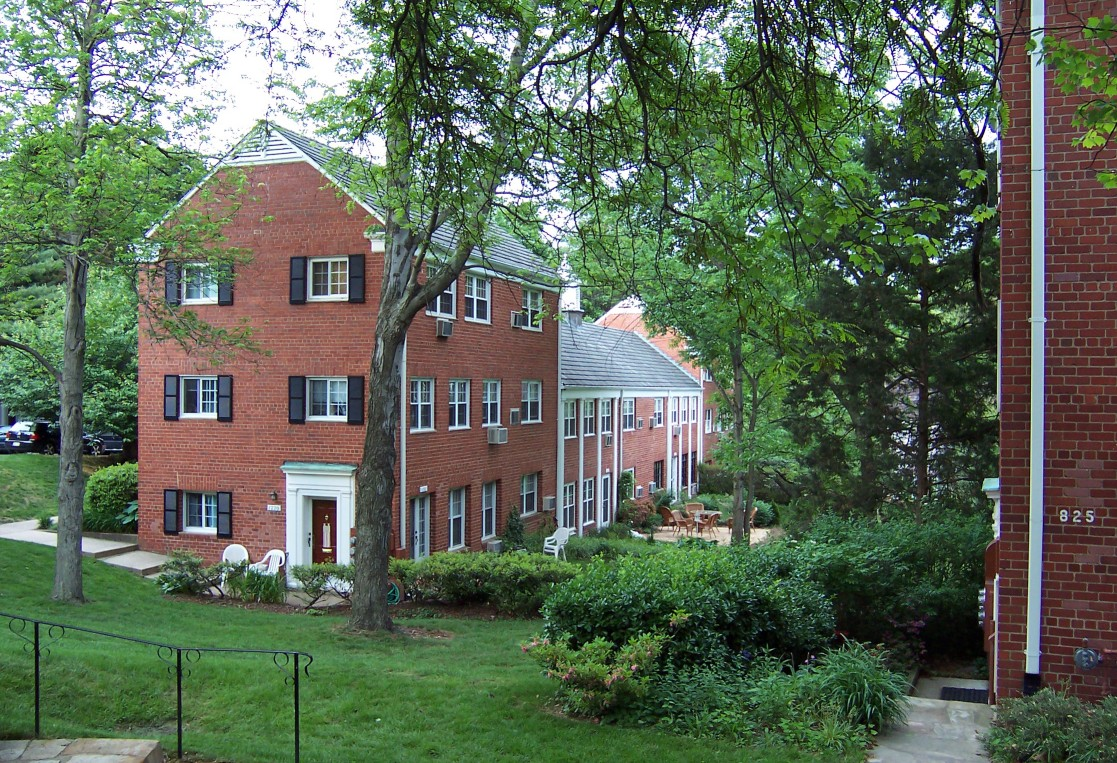
Parkfairfax in 2006

Parkfairfax was originally on 202 acres (82 ha) and was the only Metropolitan Life project of this type to have no high-rise buildings.

Former presidents Richard Nixon and Gerald Ford both lived in Parkfairfax for a time when they were in the United States Congress. Secretary of State (under John F. Kennedy) Dean Rusk also lived in Parkfairfax.

In 1976, Cardinal Karol Józef Wojtyła—the future Pope John Paul II—visited the Parkfairfax apartment of Polish-American journalist John M. Szostak and offered his blessing.

From 1977 to 1979, Parkfairfax was renovated and sold as condominium apartments by The IDI Group Companies.

== Recreation and commerce ==
The Arlington County community of Shirlington provides restaurants, stores, bars, live theater, a cinema, and the Washington & Old Dominion Railroad Trail trailhead within walking distance for Parkfairfax residents via a pedestrian walkway that crosses the Shirlington Circle interchange with I-395. Nearby shopping can be found at The Village at Shirlington.

== See also ==
- Cooperative Village
- Co-op City
- Mitchell Lama
- Parkchester, Bronx
- Parkmerced, San Francisco
- Park La Brea, Los Angeles
- Penn South
- Riverton Houses
- Rochdale Village, Queens
- Stuyvesant Town–Peter Cooper Village
- Checkers speech
