= Marcus Garvey Village =

Residential buildings in Brooklyn, New York

Coordinates: 40.66321°N 73.90985°W

- Interactive map of the Marcus Garvey Village area
- Alternative names: Marcus Garvey Park Village, Marcus Garvey Apartments

General information
- Architectural style: International Style
- Location: Brownsville, Brooklyn
- Completed: 1976

Design and construction
- Architect: Kenneth Frampton of the Institute for Architecture and Urban Studies
- Developer: New York State Urban Development Corporation

Renovating team
- Architect: Michael Kirchmann of GDSNY

Other information
- Number of units: 625

Marcus Garvey Village, also known as Marcus Garvey Apartments, is a 625-unit affordable housing development located in the Brownsville neighborhood of Brooklyn. The complex was developed by the New York State Urban Development Corporation and designed by British architect Kenneth Frampton (then at the Institute for Architecture and Urban Studies) in 1973 and completed in 1976. In 2016, Michael Kirchmann of GDSNY completed a substantial renovation of the buildings and site. It consists of multiple four-story townhouse-like structures spread across nine city blocks with stoops, private backyards, and semi-public courtyards.

The Village was one of the first low-rise, high-density public housing projects and was included in a 1973 Museum of Modern Art exhibition titled Another Chance for Housing: Lowrise Alternatives as it began construction. The complex was named after Jamaican politician and activist Marcus Garvey.
