= Anne Patterson (artist) =

American artist (born 1960)

Anne Patterson (born 1960) is an American multi-disciplinary artist based in Brooklyn, New York. Her body of work consists of paintings, sculpture, and large-scale multimedia installations. Patterson has synesthesia, a neurological condition in which stimulation to one sensory pathway triggers involuntary stimulation to another sensory pathway. This mix of sensory experiences is reflected in her art.

== Early life ==
Patterson was born in 1960. She studied architecture at Yale University and received a Master of Fine Arts in Theater Design from the Slade School of Fine Art in London.

== Career ==
Patterson's first work was as a set designer for Brooklyn Academy of Music in Brooklyn, NY, Arena Stage in Washington D.C. and the Wilma Theater in Philadelphia. Following that she designed installations for various orchestras, including the San Francisco Symphony and Philadelphia Orchestra. In the year 2006 she received the Creative Capital Performing Arts Award for her work titled Mercury Soul, an immersive multimedia collaboration between herself and musician Mason Bates. The evening event paired original works by Bates and Patterson, creating a designed environment in which “the audience enters a space of surreal visual effects and ambient electronica.” The work traveled and was shown in San Francisco, Chicago, and Miami between 2008-2012.

2013 marked a departure for Patterson in which large-scale installation work became her primary artistic output. In 2013 she was named artist-in-residence at Grace Cathedral and installed Graced with Light. The work was so popular that its run was extended six months beyond its original run, and hung from the ceiling of the Cathedral from March 2013 through February 2014.

Over the next four years, Patterson would go on to install several more large-scale fiber art installations, including The Light Between (2015) at 125 High Street in Boston, MA, Pathless Woods (2017) at the John and Mable Ringling Museum of Art, Murmuration (2017) at Christchurch Cathedral in Cincinnati, OH, and Another Sky (2017) at The Venetian Las Vegas in Las Vegas, NV.

In 2020, Patterson was commissioned by Zegna creative director Alessandro Sartori to collaborate on a large-scale, immersive art installation that was the set and centerpiece for the Fall/Winter 2020 Menswear show at Milan Fashion Week. The work was inspired by sustainability, featuring all recycled fabrics from the back catalogue of Zegna’s line. Around the same time, her installation Pathless Woods —a work that features around 24 miles of ribbons— was re-installed at the Trapholt Museum in Kolding, Denmark in the SENSE ME Exhibition, alongside artists Olafur Eliasson, Wassily Kandinsky, Georgia O’Keeffe.

In 2022, Color Factory launched a new location at the Willis Tower Chicago, IL featuring Patterson’s Night Woods, an immersive multi-media installation that features dim lighting, projections, and a custom scent designed by artist Beau Rhee.

== Awards and recognition ==
Anne Patterson is the recipient of a Creative Capital Award, numerous CODAawards, and is a fellow of the Hermitage Artist Retreat in Englewood, FL.
