= Selfie museum =

Type of museum or installation in a museum

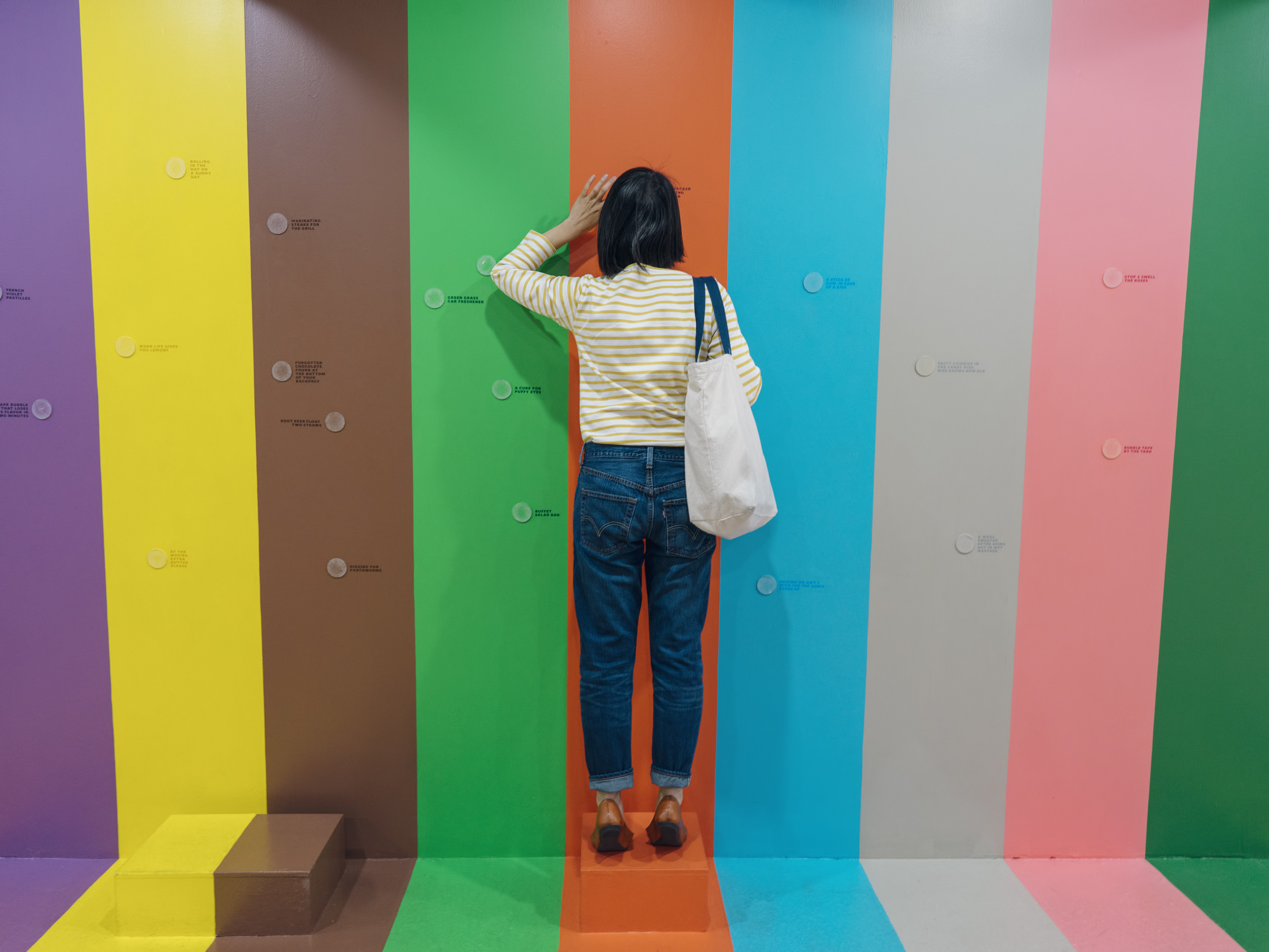
A scratch and sniff wall at the Color Factory.

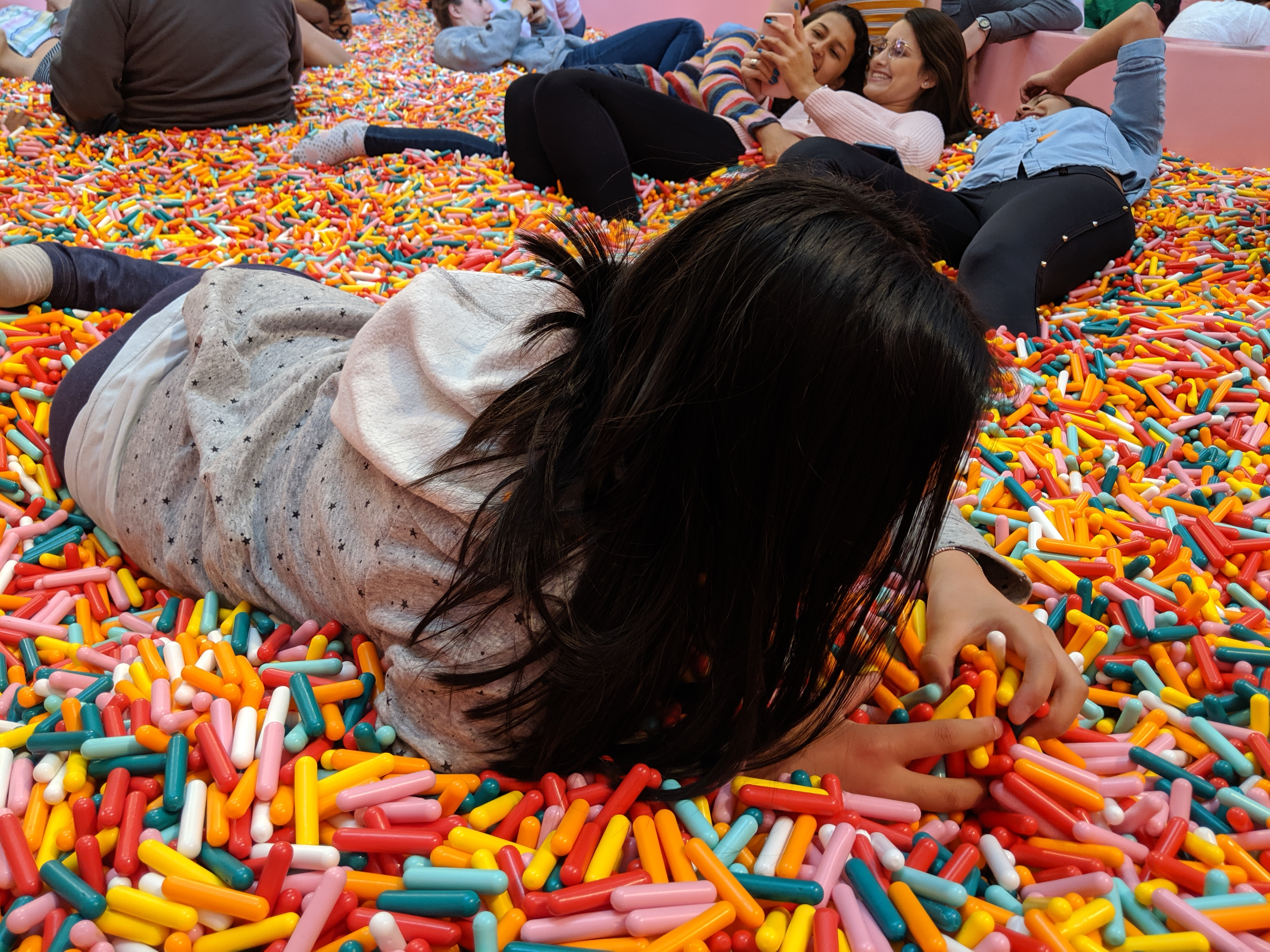
Visitors pose in a pool of oversize sprinkles at the Museum of Ice Cream.

A "selfie museum" or "Instagram museum" is a type of art gallery or installation designed to provide a setting for visitors to pose in photographs to be posted on social media sites such as Instagram. Typical features of exhibits in a selfie museum include colorful backdrops, oversize props, and optical illusions such as anamorphosis.

29Rooms, a three-day immersive art installation created by Refinery29 in 2015 in New York City, has been cited as the first example of this type of facility. The Museum of Ice Cream, opened in 2016, is also credited as a major catalyst of selfie museums. By 2019, there were reportedly dozens of selfie museums across the United States. They faced challenges in 2020 when most were forced to close temporarily due to the COVID-19 pandemic.

Some predecessors to this trend from the contemporary art world have been identified, such as Rain Room, Urban Light, and the mirrored rooms of Yayoi Kusama. The large-scale experiential artworks exhibited at the Burning Man festival have also been cited as an influence, as well as the artist collective Meow Wolf.

Some commentators have criticized the use of the word "museum" to describe these establishments. Unlike traditional museums, which are often non-profit organizations with an educational mission, selfie museums are almost always for-profit businesses, earning money through admission fees and, in some cases, corporate sponsorships. Museum of Ice Cream founder Maryellis Bunn has expressed regret over using the word, and coined the term "experium" (a portmanteau of "experience" and "museum") to describe such businesses.

Selfie museums are an example of experiential commerce. Many are pop-up exhibitions, opening for only a few months in a particular location, while others are permanent.

== Notable examples ==
- Color Factory
- Dessert Museum
- Museum of Ice Cream
- Museum of Pizza
