= Color Factory =

American art exhibition

- Established: August 2017
- Location: New York City, Houston, Chicago
- Type: Multi-Sensory Art Experience
- Website: colorfactory.co

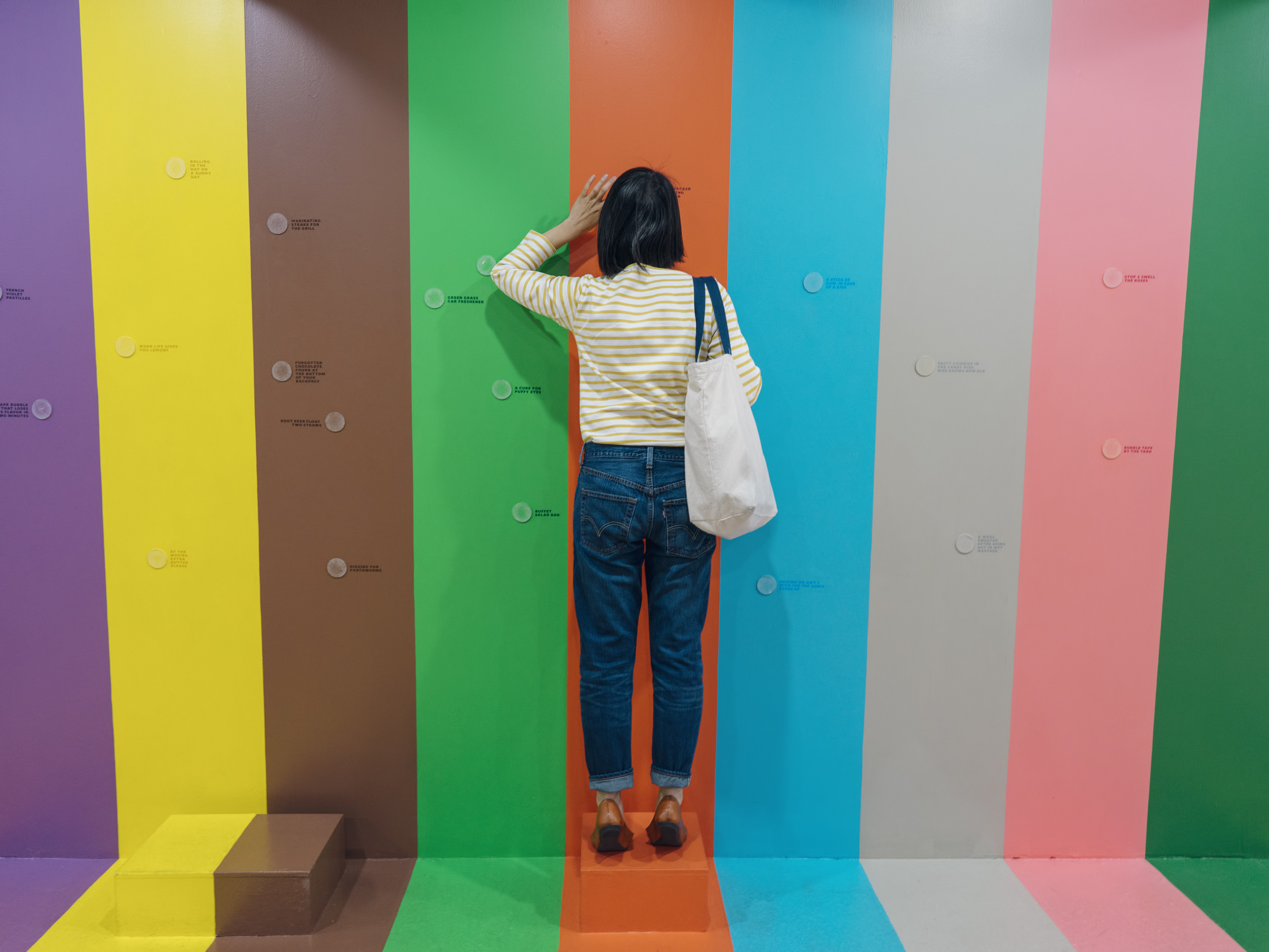
A scratch and sniff wall at the San Francisco exhibit in 2018.

Color Factory is an interactive art exhibition with brightly colored room-sized installations, each themed around the concept of color. It has permanent locations in New York City, Chicago, and Houston.

Color Factory has commonly been cited as part of a trend of "Instagram museums", temporary art exhibitions catered towards younger millennial audiences which are designed to be photographed (especially in selfies) and shared on Instagram and other social media. Co-founder Jordan Ferney has publicly pushed back against descriptions of Color Factory as an Instagram museum, stating that her goal “had always been to make something that was beautiful to experience, not photograph”.

Artists whose works have been featured in Color Factory include Jason Polan, Lakwena Maciver, Molly Young, Tosha Stimage, and Tom Stayte. Exhibits include ball pits, balloon-filled rooms, and illuminated dance floors, with cameras preinstalled throughout the exhibition for photography.

== History ==
Color Factory was founded in August 2017 by event-planner/blogger Jordan Ferney, artist Leah Rosenberg, and designer Erin Jang. It originally debuted as a one-month, 15-installation, 12,000 ft^{2} exhibition in San Francisco, sponsored by Alaska Airlines and Method Soap. Due to its popularity (at one point causing its Eventbrite ticketing page to crash from high demand), this San Francisco run was later extended to last for a total of eight and a half months.

In June and July 2018, Color Factory partnered with the Cooper Hewitt, Smithsonian Design Museum in New York City to exhibit the “Manhattan Color Walk”, an outdoor art installation which painted the ground with several stripes of colors, each sampled from a different street of Manhattan.

In August 2018, Color Factory reopened as a temporary 16-installation, 20,000 ft^{2} standalone exhibition in New York City's SoHo neighborhood, sponsored by Maybelline and Gymboree.

In November 2019, Color Factory opened an exhibition in Houston.

Color Factory was voted the best immersive art experiences in the US to visit in 2024 and 2025 by USA Today's 10Best Readers' Choice Awards.

== See also ==
- Museum of Ice Cream
- Museum of Pizza
