= Hotel Gansevoort =

Hotel in Manhattan, New York

Coordinates: 40°44′23″N 74°00′22″W

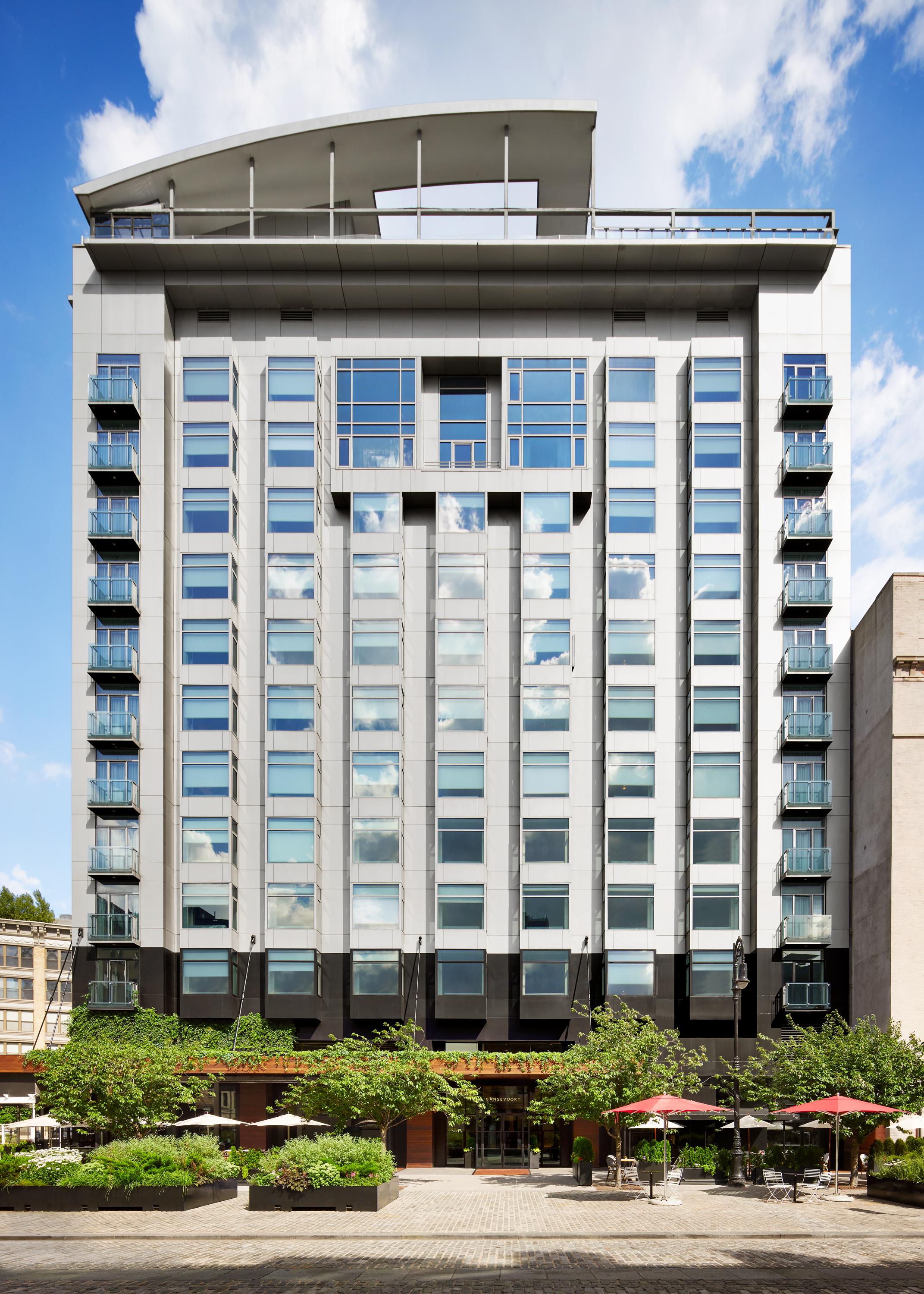
Gansevoort Meatpacking NYC

The Gansevoort Meatpacking NYC Hotel or Hotel Gansevoort is a luxury hotel located at 18 Ninth Avenue between Little West 12th Street and 13th Street in the Meatpacking District neighborhood of Manhattan, New York City. The building, which was completed in 2004, and with the completion of a renovation in 2021, the property has 187 rooms and 23 suites and features a rooftop pool and bar, among other amenities.

The Gansevoort Hotel was the first urban resort to be developed in New York, as well as the first luxury hotel in the Meatpacking District. Gansevoort Hotel Group is a subsidiary of WSA Management Ltd., a real estate development and management company.
