= Maryellis Bunn =

American entrepreneur

- Born: Maryellis Bunn; Laguna Beach, California
- Education: New York University; Parsons School of Design
- Alma mater: Business and design
- Occupations: Founder & CEO; Creative Director
- Years active: 2010s-present
- Organization: Figure8, Inc
- Known for: Museum of Ice Cream

Maryellis Bunn is an American entrepreneur, creative director, and the founder of Figure8, Inc, which is the parent company of the Museum of Ice Cream (MOIC). She developed a concept for converting vacant retail spaces into immersive, museum-style environments, opening the first MOIC location in New York City in 2016. The installation combines fantasy-themed design elements, social interaction, and retail components. By 2019, the company had reached a valuation of $200 million.

As the Museum of Ice Cream brand expanded in the United States and internationally, Bunn has been recognised by Forbes and Ad Age as a pioneer in the cultural experience concept known as an experium, a version of experiential museums.

== Early life and education ==
Bunn was raised in Laguna Beach, California. She moved to New York City for higher education, graduating from New York University and earning a joint degree in business and design from Parsons School of Design.

== Career ==
After completing her studies, Bunn worked in design and business strategy, including serving as Head of Forecasting and Innovation at Time Inc. She later consulted for major companies such as Facebook, Instagram, Staples, and Fortune before launching a new venture in 2016 with co-founder Manish Vora. The self-funded venture with co-founder Vora was Figure8 Inc., which focused on creating multi-sensory, inclusive experiences inspired by ice cream. The concept debuted as a pop-up in Manhattan's Meatpacking District in 2016, where the Museum of Ice Cream brand first emerged.

The exhibit's popularity led to additional pop-ups and later permanent locations in cities such as Los Angeles, Miami and San Francisco. Bunn coined the term "experiums" for these spaces, which drew over 1 million visitors in 2018. These achievements saw her recognized on the Forbes 30 Under 30 list and also by Ad Age. To support further growth, Bunn secured $40 million in Series A funding in 2019, enabling expansion across the U.S. and into Singapore and Shanghai. That same year, MOIC opened its Soho flagship. In 2020, a design intended to honor victims of police brutality drew criticism for its color scheme, prompting revisions and an apology. MOIC then expanded internationally with openings in Singapore, Austin, Chicago, and Shanghai between 2021 and 2022, including a collaboration with Shake Shack for the Shanghai site.

Bunn shifted the focus to expanding MOIC's permanent experium venues rather than temporary pop-ups from 2022 onwards. This included new locations in the United States beginning with Miami in September 2024, and followed by a location in Boston that December. The brand continued developing as a scalable concept with a focus on new immersive installations such as the "Creamliner" and "Hall of Freezers" in Miami. Bunn also announced further expansion, with a Las Vegas location planned for 2026, and the first ground-up MOIC building in California revealed in late 2025. The Los Angeles MOIC will be the first permanent site in the state, following its earlier 2017 pop-up.

Bunn has received further criticism for her management, including reports by employees of regular verbal harassment, refusing to provide restroom breaks, sick leaves even with doctor notes, and more. Further, Bunn "carried a 7% CEO approval rating on Glassdoor, where the average is 69%", according to a Forbes article published in 2020 detailing the company's and especially Bunn's challenges during the COVID pandemic.

MOIC experiums have themselves been criticized for their focus on social media photographic appeal over substance. As one WIRED story notes, "It’s hard to walk through the space and imagine it as anything but a series of Instagram backdrops."
