= Ninth Avenue (Manhattan) =

North-south avenue in Manhattan, New York

- Columbus Avenue (59th–110th Streets); Morningside Drive (north of 110th Street)
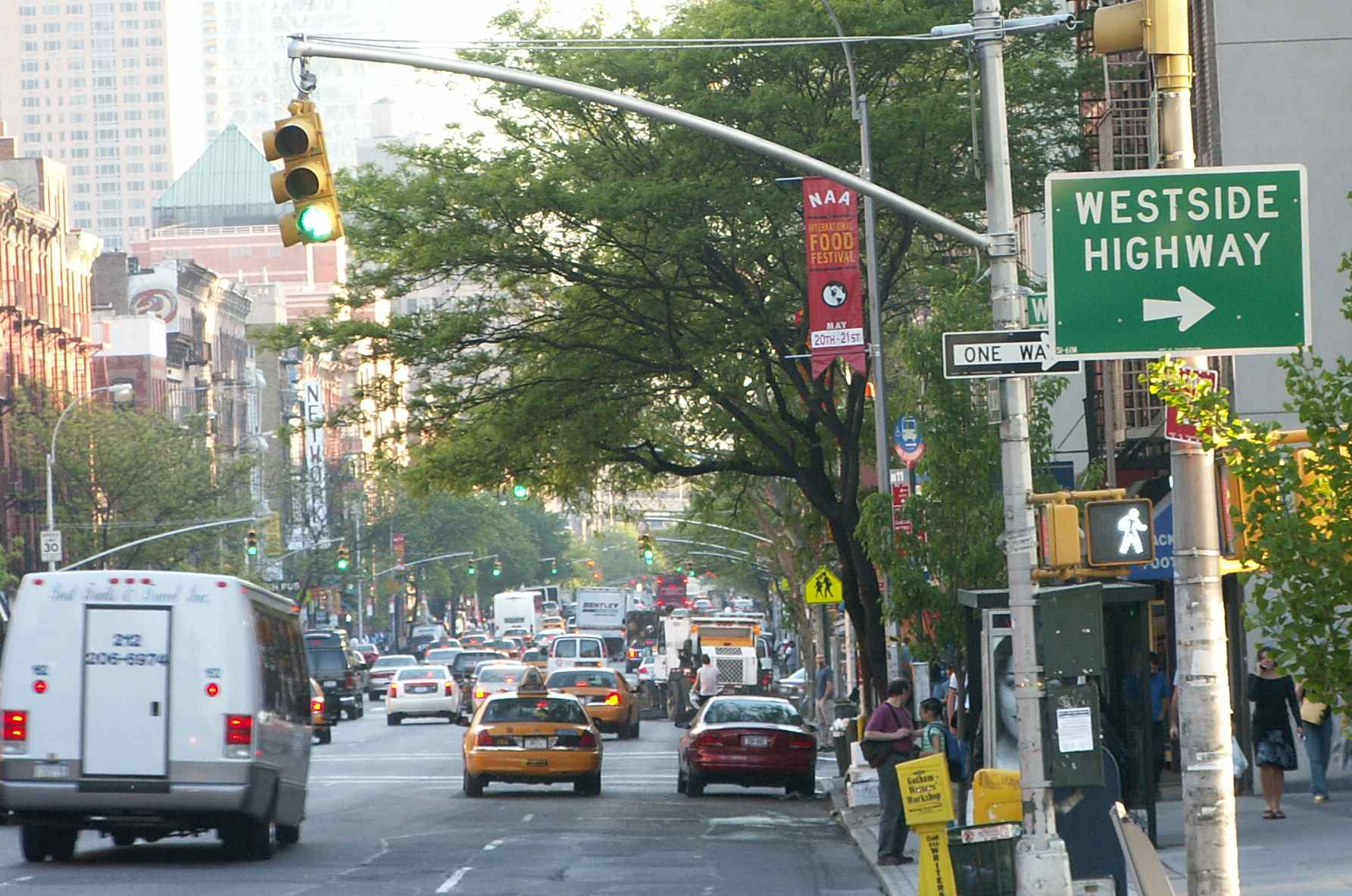
- The avenue in Hell's Kitchen
- Interactive map of Ninth Avenue
- Owner: City of New York
- Maintained by: NYCDOT
- Length: 5.7 mi (9.2 km)
- Location: Manhattan, New York City
- South end: Greenwich Street
- North end: Broadway above West 220th Street in Inwood, Manhattan
- East: Eighth Avenue (below 59th Street); Central Park West (59th–110th Streets)
- West: Tenth Avenue (below 59th Street); Amsterdam Avenue (above 59th Street)

Construction
- Commissioned: March 1811

Ninth Avenue, known as Columbus Avenue between West 59th and 110th Streets, is a thoroughfare on the West Side of Manhattan in New York City, New York. Traffic runs downtown (southbound) from the Upper West Side to Chelsea. Two short sections of Ninth Avenue also exist in the Inwood neighborhood, carrying two-way traffic.

== Description ==
Ninth Avenue originates just south of West 14th Street at Gansevoort Street in the West Village, and extends uptown for 48 blocks until its intersection with West 59th Street, where it becomes Columbus Avenue – named after Christopher Columbus. It continues without interruption through the Upper West Side to West 110th Street, where its name changes again, to Morningside Drive, and runs north through Morningside Heights to West 122nd Street.

A one-block stretch of Ninth Avenue between 15th and 16th Streets is also signed as "Oreo Way". The first Oreo cookies were manufactured in 1912 at the former Nabisco headquarters on that block.

The portion of the avenue between 14th and 31st Streets was remodeled in 2008 with a bicycle lane between the eastern curb and the parking lane, followed by another portion between 77th and 96th Streets in 2011.

Above the Lincoln Square neighborhood—where the ABC television network houses its corporate headquarters in a group of rehabilitated and modern buildings—Columbus Avenue passes through the Central Park West Historic District, stretching from 67th/68th Streets to 89th Street. There, the avenue presents a unified streetscape of 5- to 7-story tenement buildings of brick and brownstone with discreet Romanesque and Italianate details, employing cast terracotta details and panels and courses of angle-laid brickwork. Many ornate tin cornices remain. The buildings are separated in mid-block by the narrowest of access alleys, giving glimpses of Ailanthus foliage in the side-street yards. The repeated designs of three or four commercial speculative builders, using the same features and detailing, add to the avenue's architectural unity. There are several generously scaled pre-World War I apartment buildings and the former Endicott Hotel, as well as a small commercial block from the office of McKim, Mead, and White at 72nd Street.

Between 77th and 81st Streets, Columbus Avenue borders the American Museum of Natural History and Theodore Roosevelt Park.

Ninth Avenue reappears in the Inwood neighborhood as a short two-way street in two segments interrupted by the New York City Subway's 207th Street Yard. It runs from West 201st Street to West 208th Street, dead-ending at Inwood North Cove Park at the Harlem River, then picks up again at West 215th Street, and terminates at Broadway between West 220th Street and the Broadway Bridge, at the location where West 221st Street would normally be. The addresses along this upper stretch from 201st Street to Broadway are continuous with the lower portion of Ninth Avenue.

== History ==
The Ninth Avenue Elevated was a passenger train that ran above Ninth Avenue, beginning in the nineteenth century. The lease for the line was assumed by the Interborough Rapid Transit Company (IRT) on April 1, 1903. The line ran until it was closed and dismantled in 1940, following the purchase of the IRT by the City of New York, as it was made redundant by the city's Eighth Avenue subway line.

Ninth Avenue north of 59th Street was officially renamed Columbus Avenue in 1890. By then, 59th Street had become a kind of dividing line between Midtown and the newer residential districts growing along the Upper West Side, near Central Park. Local property owners and merchants on the Upper West Side wanted to distance their neighborhood from the gritty, industrial reputation of “Ninth Avenue” farther downtown. The numbered avenue names on the far West Side were associated with rail yards, slaughterhouses, tenements, and the elevated train lines. Renaming streets was an early branding exercise.

At roughly the same time:

- Eighth Avenue north of 59th became Central Park West
- Tenth Avenue north of 59th became Amsterdam Avenue
- Eleventh Avenue north of 59th became West End Avenue

These changes were meant to make the Upper West Side sound more elegant and residential, helping real estate values and attracting wealthier residents.

The renaming came during a period of intense enthusiasm around Christopher Columbus in New York and the U.S., especially leading into the 400th anniversary of Columbus’s 1492 voyage (celebrated in 1892). Columbus Circle itself was being planned around the same era, so “Columbus Avenue” fit the civic mood and gave the avenue a grander identity.

59th Street marked the southern edge of Central Park and the beginning of a distinctly different urban environment. South of there, Ninth Avenue already had an established commercial identity in Hell’s Kitchen and Chelsea, so the city kept the old name. North of there, developers wanted a “new” Upper West Side image.

Ninth Avenue and Columbus Avenue were converted to carry one-way traffic southbound in two stages. South of its intersection with Broadway, the avenue was converted on November 6, 1948. The remaining stretch, to 110th Street, was converted on December 6, 1951.

In 2007, Ninth Avenue became the first major north-south avenue in Manhattan with a protected bike lane. The bike lane initially extended only from 23rd to 16th Street. A protected bike lane on Columbus Avenue was built between 96th and 77th Street in 2010–2011; the bike lane led to increases in vehicular speeds, since drivers were no longer stuck behind bicyclists. After a $231 million project that replaced some of the water pipes under Ninth Avenue, the segment between 59th and 50th Street was narrowed to three travel lanes in March 2023, and a painted sidewalk and protected bike lane were added. In 2026, in anticipation of increased pedestrian traffic during the 2026 FIFA World Cup, the New York City Department of Transportation announced plans to extend the protected bike lane and painted sidewalk from 50th to 34th Street.

The Ninth Avenue International Food Festival street fair is held every year in May.

== Transportation ==
Uptown buses use 10th Avenue unless specified below:

- The M11 is the primary server of Ninth Avenue, running along the entire segment.
- The M100 runs downtown north of West 215th Street.
- The M7 runs from Duke Ellington Boulevard to Broadway.
- The M79 SBS runs from West 81st to West 79th Streets.
- The uptown M20 runs from West 66th Street to Broadway, before starting downtown service at West 63rd Street.
- The M34A SBS runs from West 43rd to West 34th Streets, but starts service at West 42nd. Uptown buses use 8th Avenue.
- The M12 and M14D SBS run south of West 18th Street. Uptown buses use West Street.

The New York City Subway's IRT Broadway–Seventh Avenue Line (1 train) has a station on Columbus Avenue at 66th Street and Broadway).

== Points of interest ==
- Alvin Ailey American Dance Theater, on Ninth Avenue and 55th Street
- American Museum of Natural History
- Church of St. Paul the Apostle
- Church of the Holy Apostles
- Fordham University
- Gansevoort Market
- John Jay College
- Lincoln Center for the Performing Arts, intersection of Columbus Avenue and Broadway (near 65th Street)
- Manhattan West
- Moynihan Station
- Port Authority Bus Terminal, 41st Street
- Mount Sinai West, formerly Roosevelt Hospital
- West 73rd–74th Street Historic District
- 66th Street – the only subway station on Ninth or Columbus Avenues, serving the 1 and 2 trains

== Gallery ==
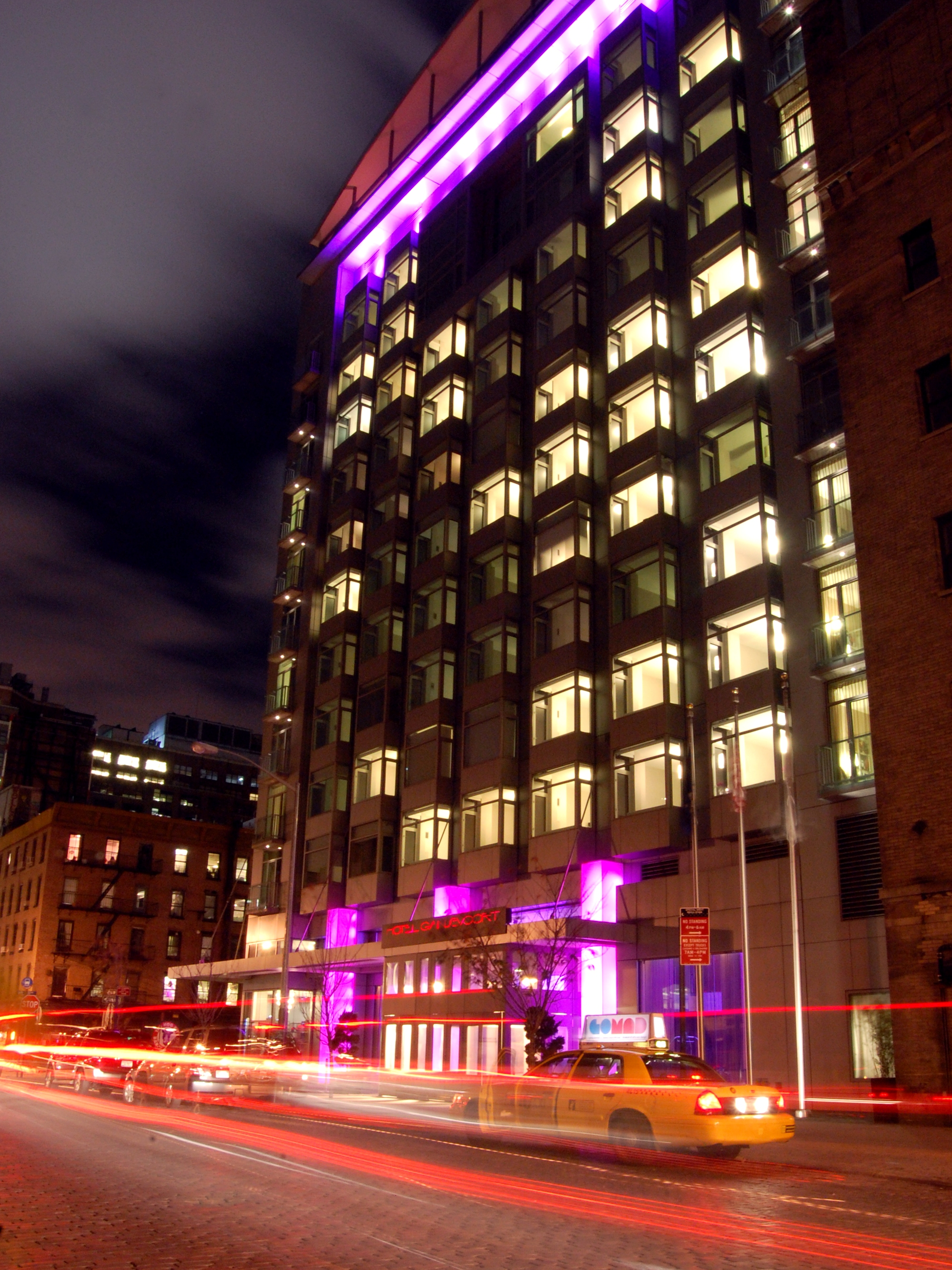
The Hotel Gansevoort at 18 Ninth Avenue

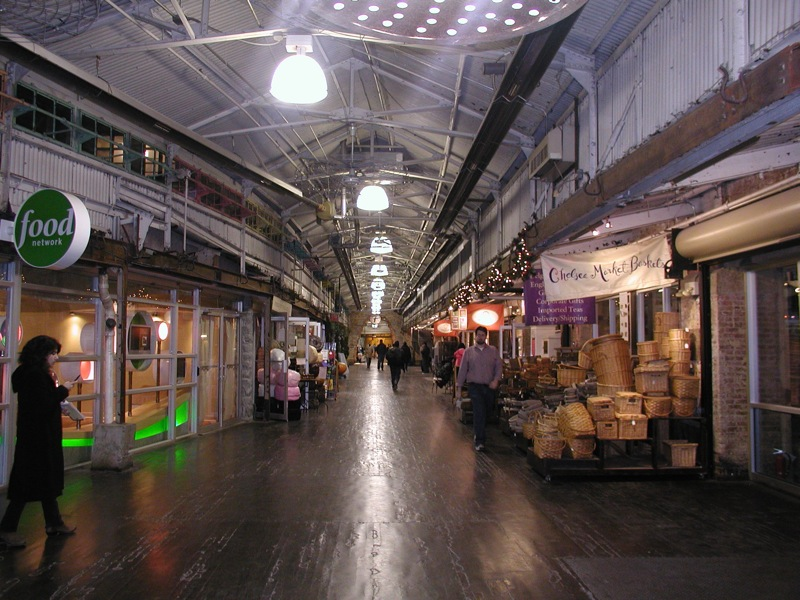
The interior of Chelsea Market, the main entrance of which is on Ninth Avenue between 15th-16th Streets

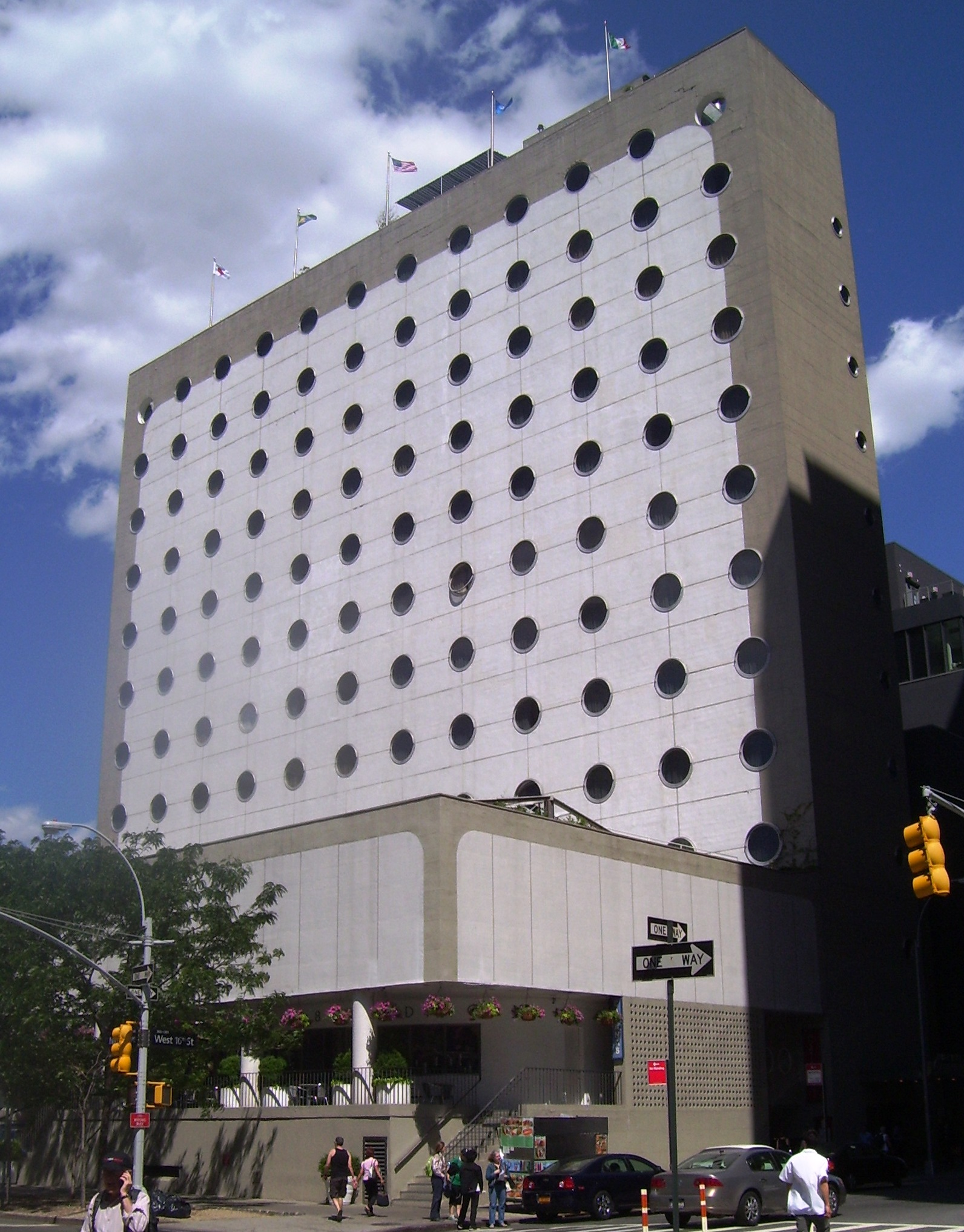
The Maritime Hotel at 16th-17th Streets

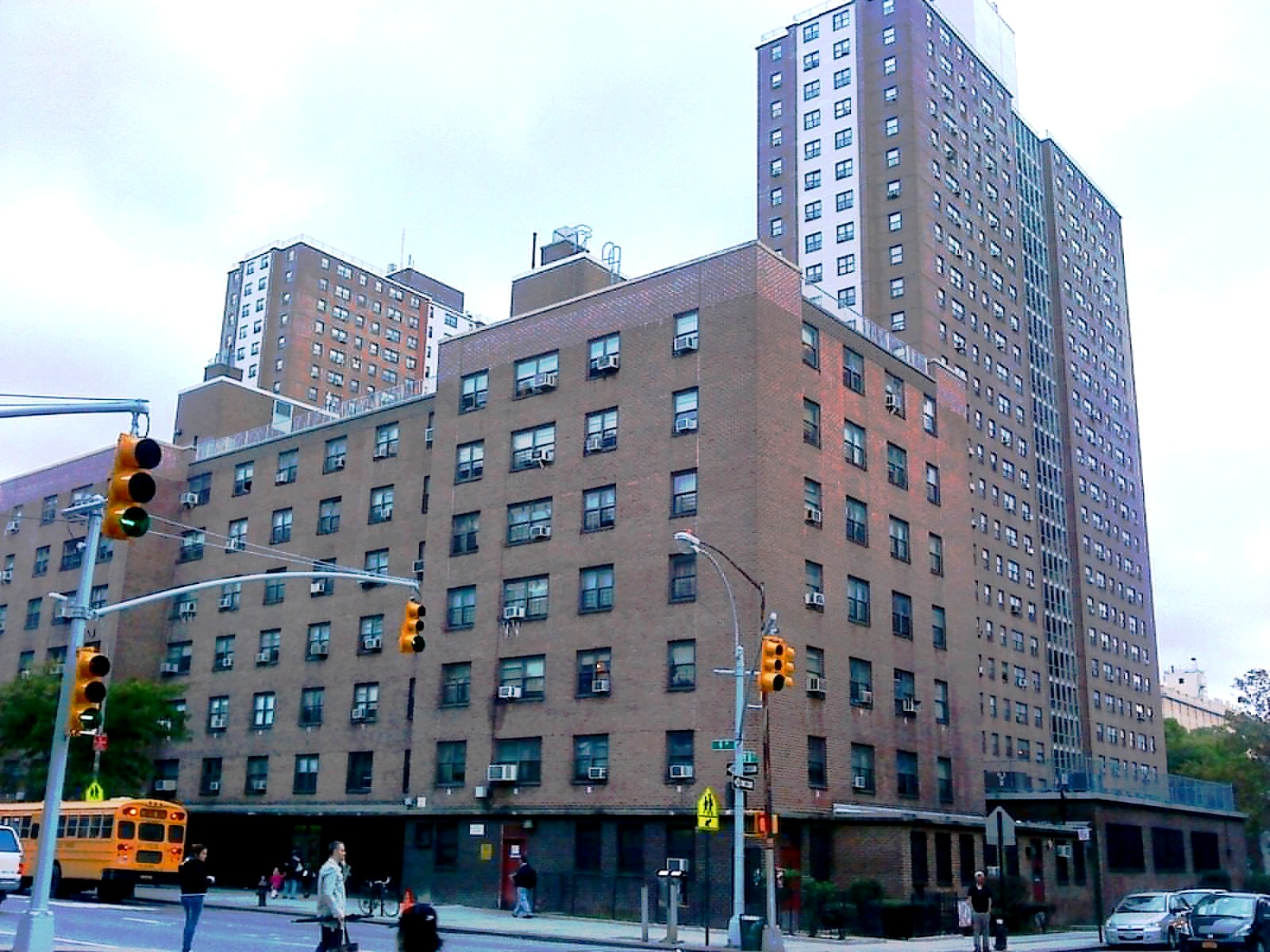
The Fulton Houses of the New York City Housing Authority at 18th Street

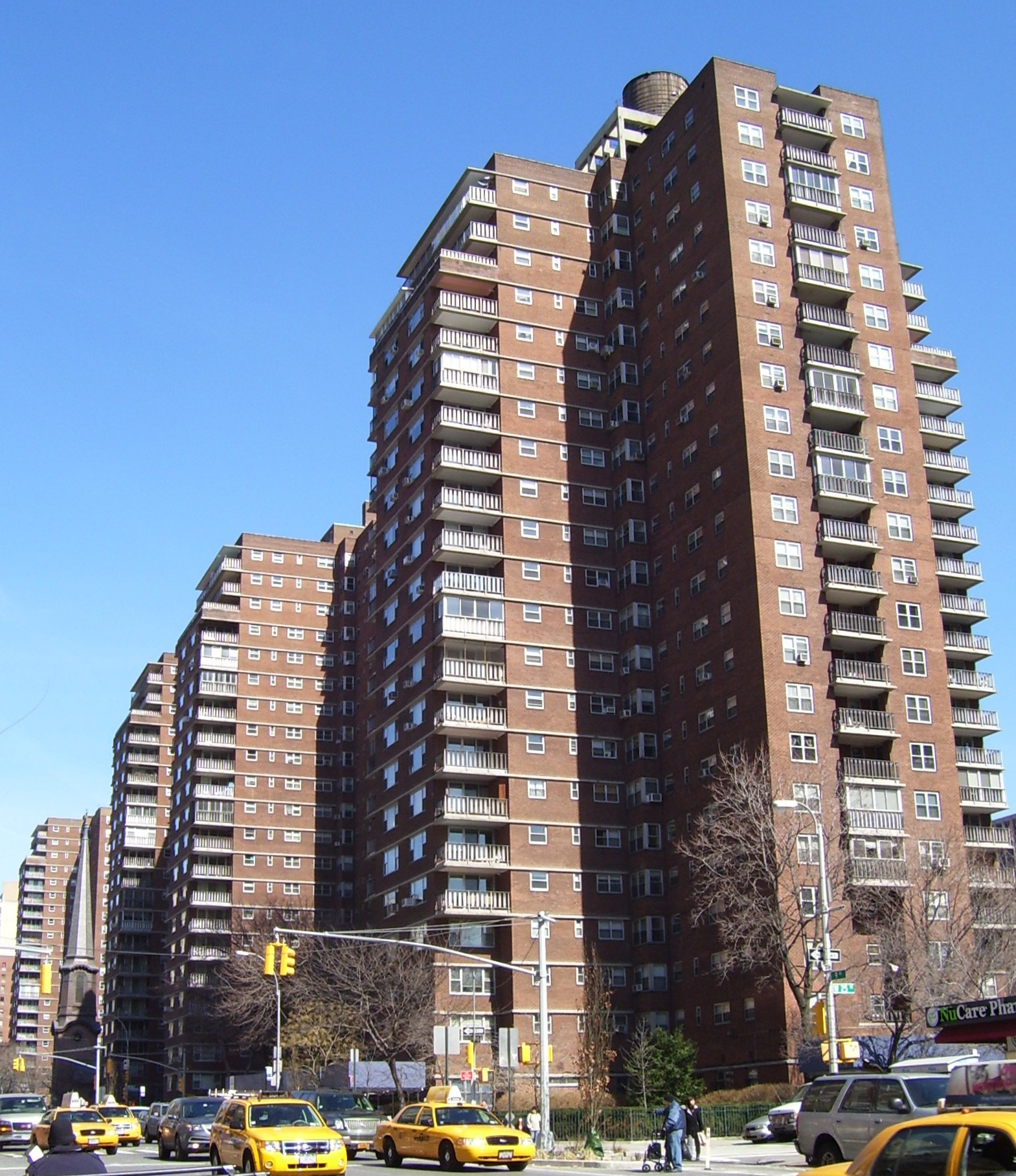
The Penn South housing complex at 25th Street

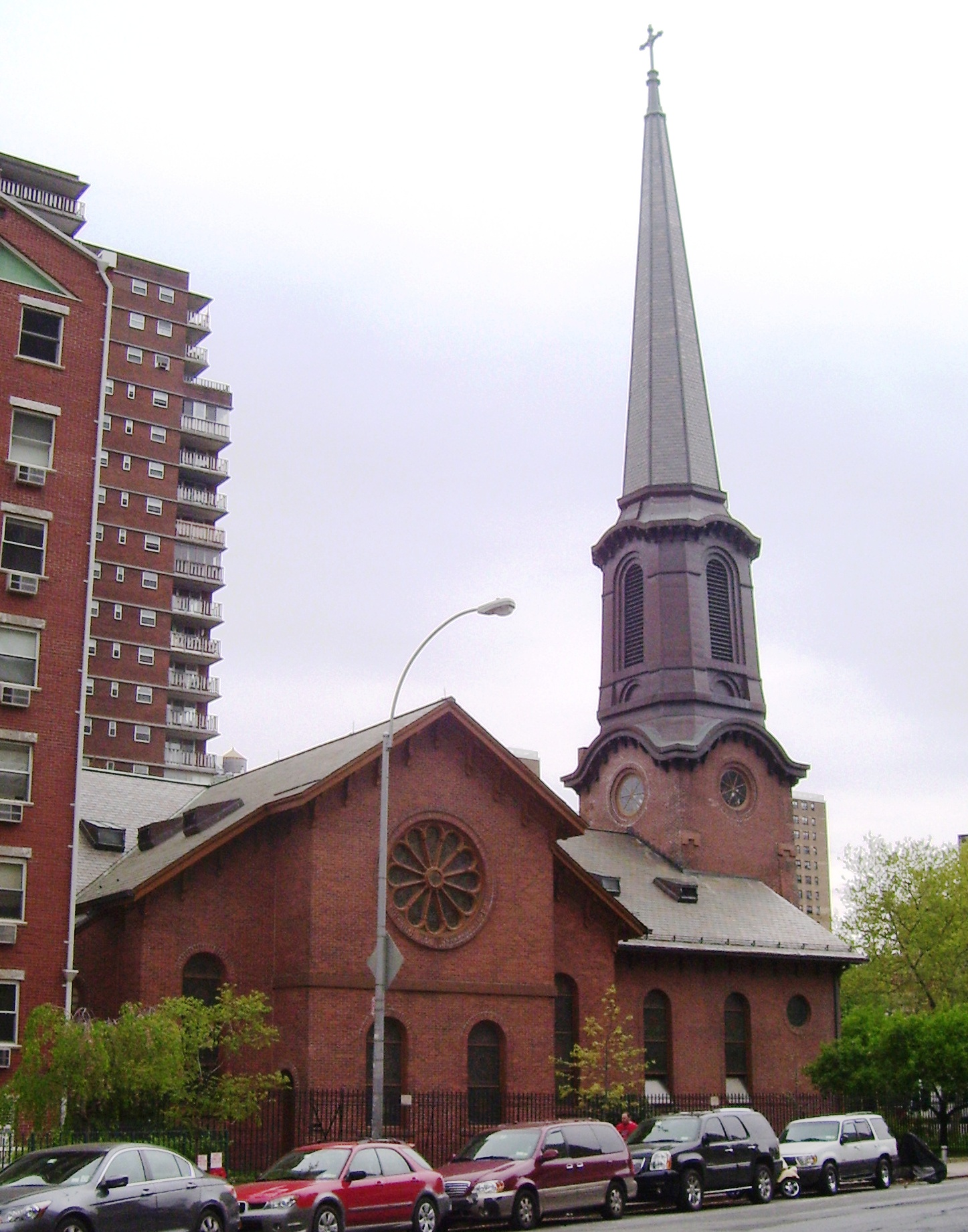
The Church of the Holy Apostles at 28th Street

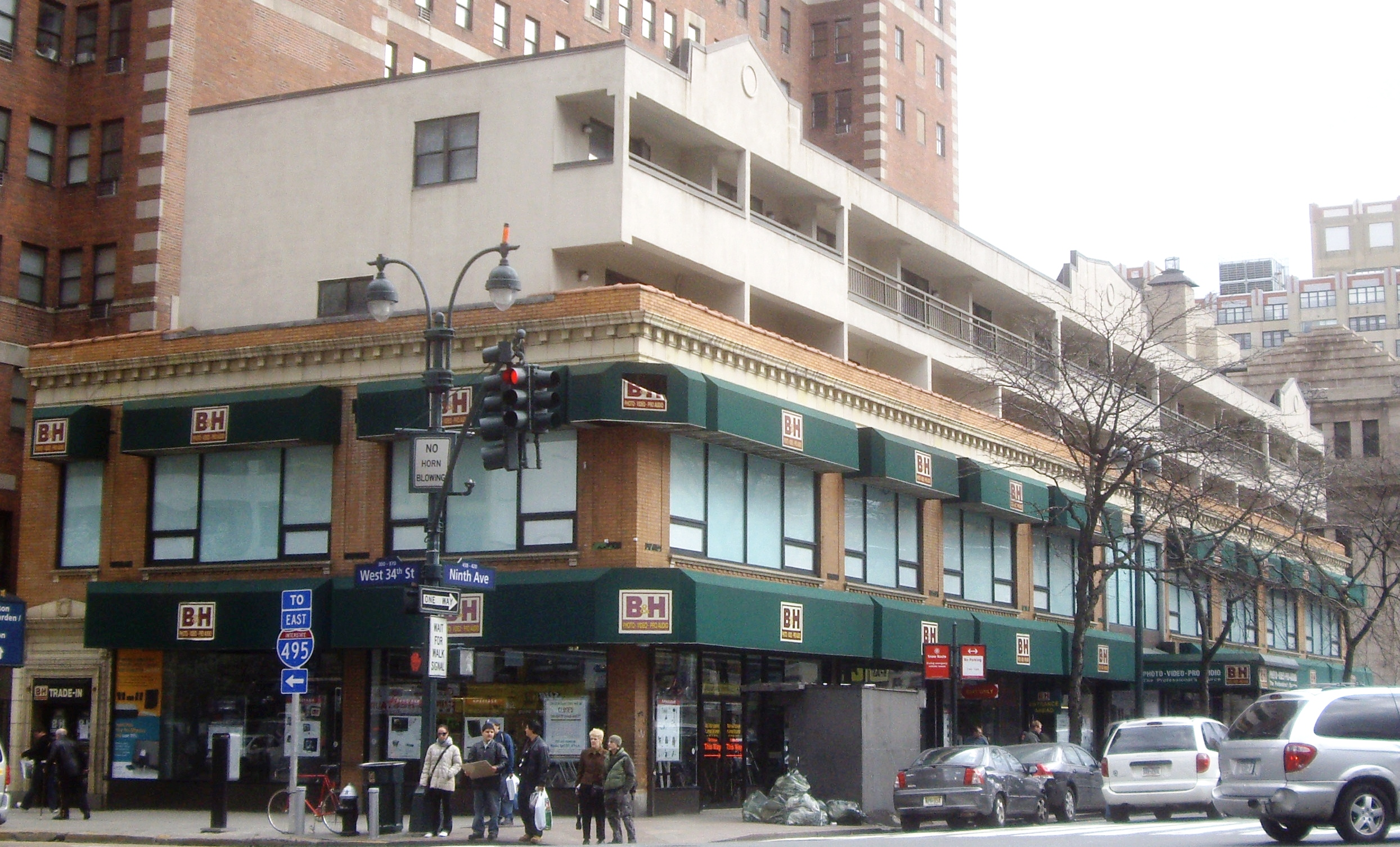
B&H Photo Video at 34th Street

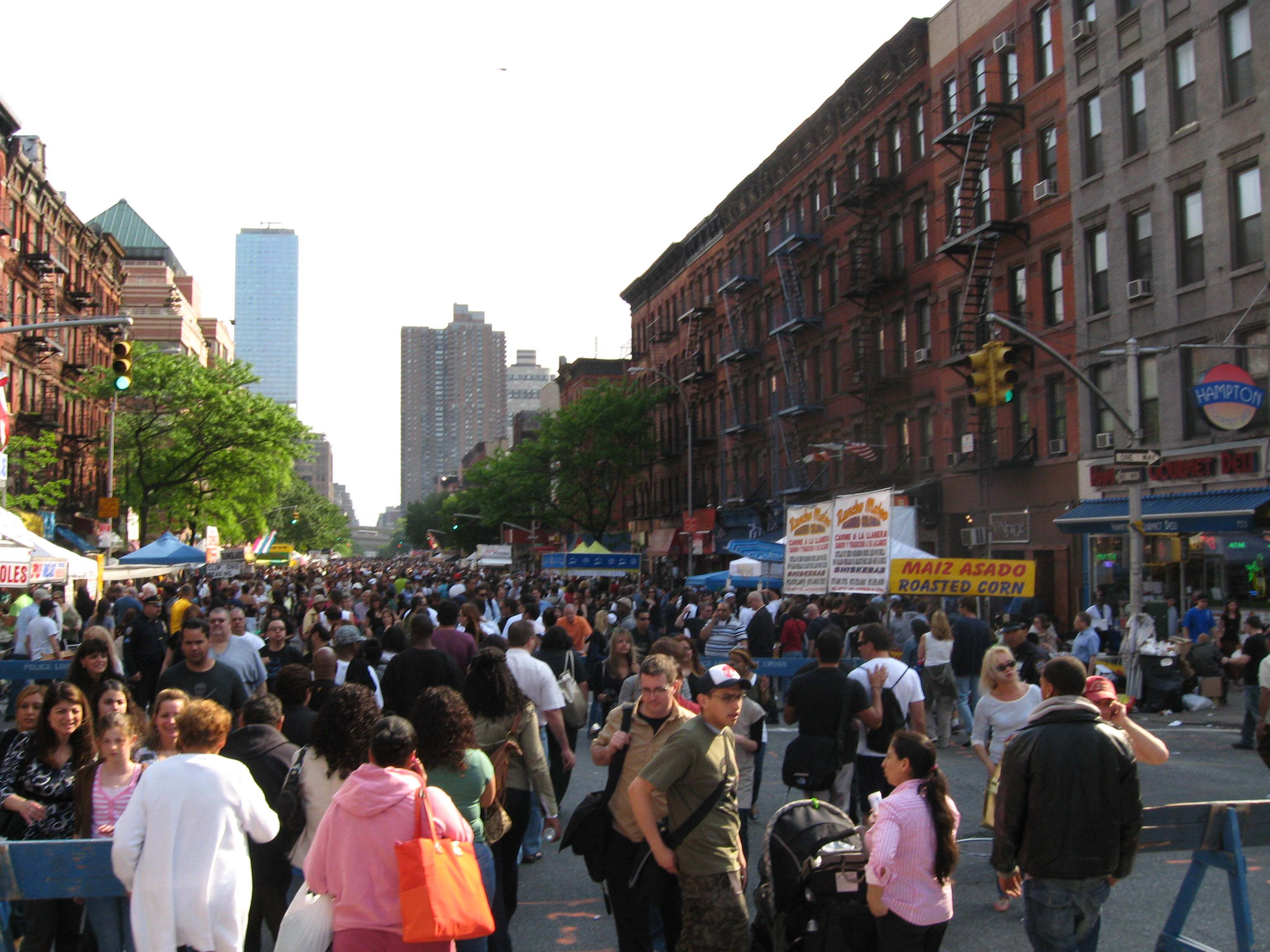
The Ninth Avenue International Food Festival

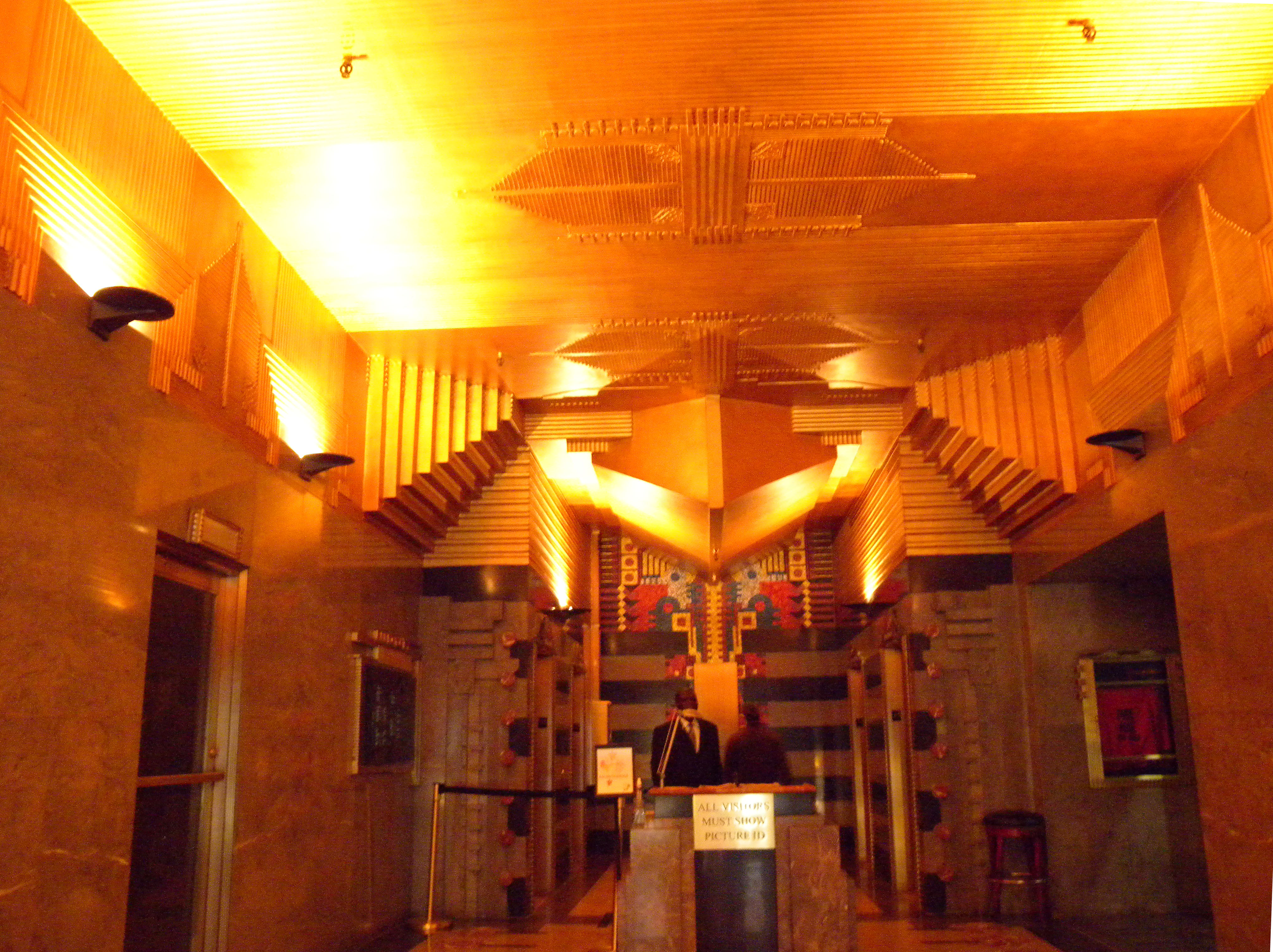
The lobby of the Film Center Building at 44th-45th Streets

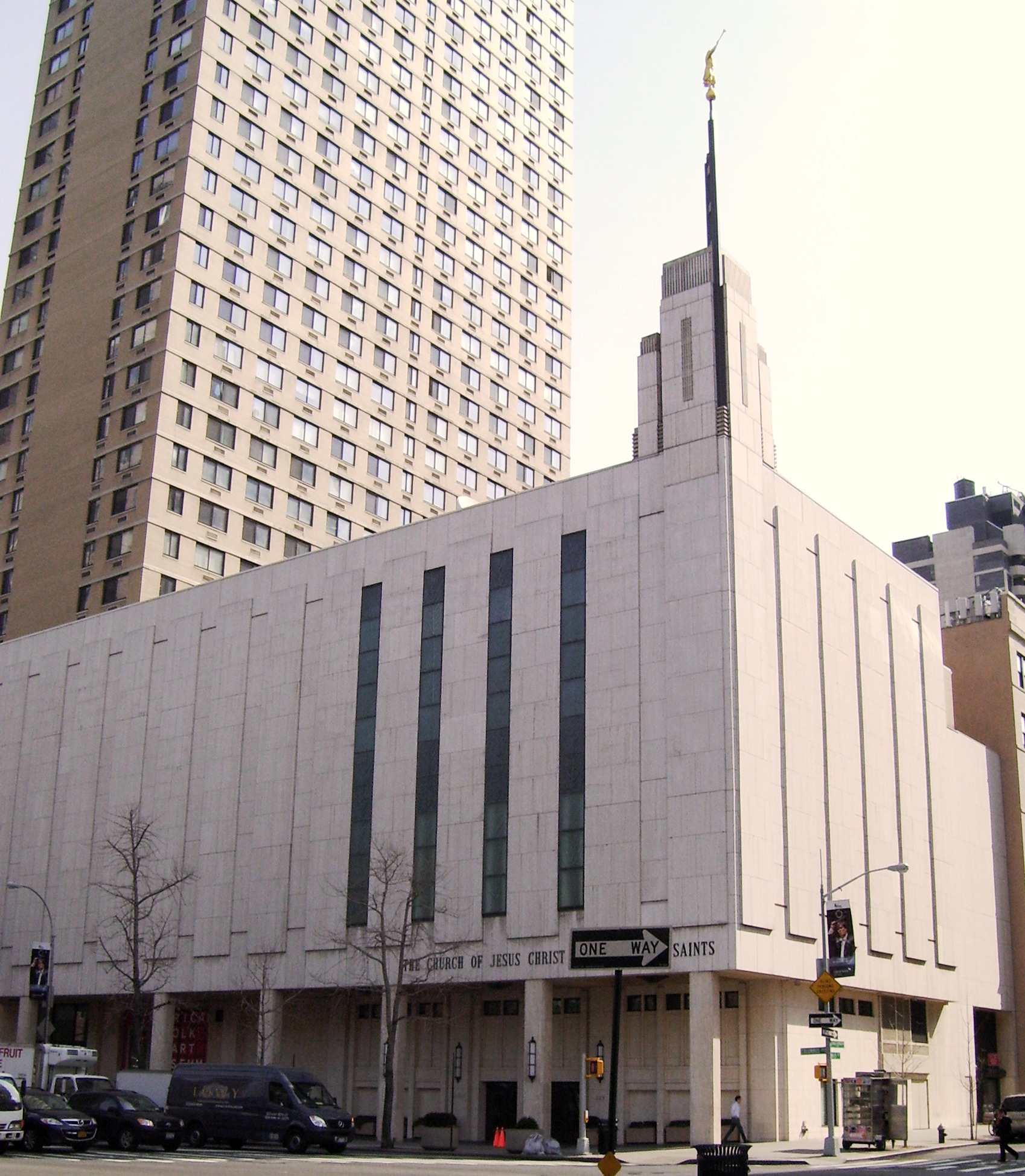
The Manhattan New York Temple of the Church of Jesus Christ of Latter-day Saints at 65th-66th Streets

== In popular culture ==
- Ninth Avenue is the setting of Saul Steinberg's View of the World from 9th Avenue.
- In the TV show Seinfeld, the street set on which most of the street scenes were filmed was based on Columbus Avenue.
- In the play The Zoo Story by Edward Albee, Jerry claims to live between Columbus Avenue and Central Park.
