= Museum of Pizza =

Pop-up art exhibition in New York City

Coordinates: 40°43′21.5″N 73°57′24.6″W

The Museum of Pizza, otherwise known as MoPi, was a pop-up exhibition, or "selfie museum", of pizza-themed art that took place in Brooklyn, New York, from October 13 to November 16, 2018. The Museum of Pizza featured artwork by over 25 different artists, including large-scale pizza-inspired custom installations by Adam Green, Shawna-x, Signe Pierce and Emma Stern, Gazoo To The Moon, and more.

== Exhibits ==
The museum consisted of a group show titled "The Psychedelic Pizza Parlor", which was curated by RJ Supa of the Yours, Mine, and Ours Gallery (located in downtown Manhattan) and featured work from Sarah Bahbah, Hein Kohn, Adam Parker Smith. Andrew W.K.'s custom pizza guitar was also on display. The Museum also displayed 70 pizza boxes from Scott Wiener's Guinness World Record holding pizza box collection. A preview party was held at the New Museum. Upon leaving the exhibition, visitors were also able to have a free slice of pizza from pizzeria Williamsburg Pizza.

The Museum of Pizza was created by Kareem Rahma, co-founder of Brooklyn-based media company Nameless Network. Rahma was inspired by the Museum of Ice Cream, as well as a cave system in Lebanon, which served as the inspiration for the Museum's "Cheese Cave" exhibit. Rahma detailed the process of creating the museum on an episode of Gianmarco Soresi's podcast The Downside.

The museum hosted over 25,000 people in its six-week run.
