= Tenjune =

Former nightclub in New York City

Coordinates: 40°44′24″N 74°00′27″W

Tenjune was a nightclub in the Meatpacking District of Manhattan, New York City, on Little West 12th Street. The music played in the club ranges from hip-hop to techno. It opened in August 2006.

The club began receiving media attention in February 2007 due to its celebrity clientele, but it came under public pressure in August 2010. The club allowed the 17-year-old daughter of Eric G. John, the US Ambassador to Thailand, to enter and drink at the club; later that night, the girl died in a fall from the 22nd floor of a Midtown apartment building.
