= Rubin & Chapelle =

New York-based fashion company

- Founded: 1997
- Headquarters: New York, NY
- Website: www.rubinchapelle.com

Rubin & Chapelle is a New York-based fashion company founded by designers Kip Chapelle and Sonja Rubin.

== History ==
Rubin & Chapelle apparel is produced in the United States, in New York and Los Angeles. From 2000 until 2008, production was done in Italy. Prior to the company's founding, Sonja Rubin worked for Vivienne Westwood and Perry Ellis while Kip Chapelle worked for Giorgio Armani and Calvin Klein. The designers have also designed and produced apparel for Saks Fifth Avenue and Barneys New York. They are known for bias cut technique, suits, dresses, and knitwear.

The designers were among the first to establish a retail presence in Manhattan's Meatpacking District, opening their first store there in 2002. The second store was opened in Malibu, California in 2011. Both stores were designed by architect Annabelle Selldorf. The line has a number of celebrity clients, and retailers have included: Barneys New York, Bergdorf Goodman, Saks Fifth Avenue, Neiman Marcus, Barneys Japan, Fred Segal, and Joyce Boutique.

Rubin & Chapelle received the Rising Star Award in 2000 from Fashion Group International. In 2003 they received the Fashion Award of the City of Vienna in (2003). They received a Senatorial Citation from Ohio Senator Tom Roberts in 2002. Select Rubin & Chapelle designs have been acquired for the permanent museum collections of School of the Art Institute of Chicago and Fashion Institute of Technology. In 2011, the designers were inducted into the Council of Fashion Designers of America.
