= Experiential retail =

Type of retail marketing

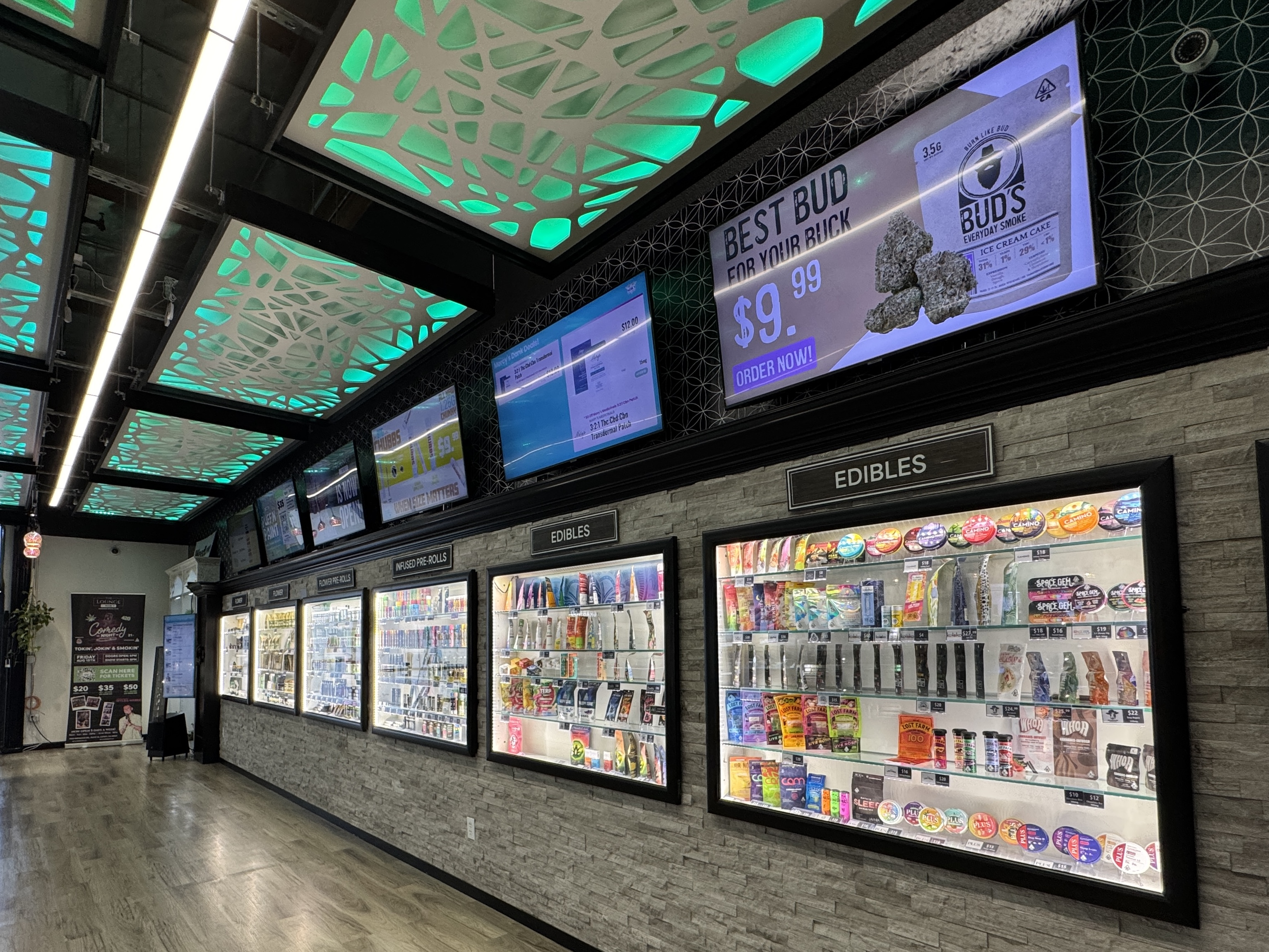
Some high-end cannabis retail outlets use experiential commerce approaches, such as creative architecture, colored lighting, lit-up glass display cases, artworks, and background music to create a memorable ambiance and attract customers.

Experiential retail or experiential commerce is a type of retail marketing whereby customers coming into a physical retail space are offered experiences beyond the traditional ones (such as in a clothing store: browsing merchandise, advice from salespeople, dressing rooms and cashiers). Amenities provided may include art (often interactive art), live music performances, virtual reality, cafés and lounges, and large video display walls.

== Theory ==
As of 2019, the target market for experiential commerce is chiefly Millennials, who are (supposedly, according to "studies") as a group overall less materialistic than previous generations and prone to spend relatively more of their disposable income on services - for example wellness and gyms. This supposed spending pattern is disputed by the Federal Reserve.

Even where there is a product consumed, such as at Starbucks and its competitors, customers are paying more "because of the experience", not (only) because it might be a better product than at a diner, for example. Apple Stores purport to provide not only a superior product but an "experience" and a "gathering space" or "Town Square" as well.

E-commerce retailers such as Casper, Harry's and b8ta have established a limited number of experiential physical retail locations where customers can view and interact with their products in person.

Such experiential retail spaces are also seen as a response to the reported tendency among Millennials to demonstrate greater brand loyalty than previous generations, who more frequently made purchasing decisions based on price and product interchangeability.

== Examples ==
Examples of experiential retail and experiential commerce are:

- Samsung's "Samsung 837" pop-up store in Manhattan, a "cavern"-style venue of 560,000 square feet (52,000 m^{2}) with interactive art, virtual reality, lounge areas, a recording studio and a 3-story 96-screen display wall.
- House of Vans in London, U.K., a 30,000-square-foot (2,800 m^{2}) space with a concrete mini-ramp, and street course for skateboards, cinema, café, live music venue and art gallery
- Escape rooms
- Farfetch pop-up stores in the U.K. for online retailers of high-end apparel
- IKEA events where customers could spend the night in their warehouse in Essex, England and were given massages, could select their bed linens and received sleep and mattress consultations from a sleep expert.
- Selfie museums, where visitors are encouraged to interact with exhibits and pose for photographs.
- Space Ninety 8, an offshoot of Urban Outfitters that sells merchandise, has yoga classes, album signings, art classes, and other social space.
- TOMS, a shoe company that placed virtual reality headsets into 100 stores "virtually transporting" them to Peru to see the impact of a social campaign.

Experiential commerce encompasses experiential retail but also may be purely virtual experiences or not connected to any semi-permanently or otherwise established space owned by a brand, for example:

- Airbnb "Experiences" platform offering lodging combined with experiences in cities
- Red Bull that spent $65 million to, with the help of agency MediaMonks, drop the Austrian daredevil Felix Baumgartner out of a space balloon, and live streamed it
