= Museum of Ice Cream =

Chain of art installations and museums in the US

- Industry: Experience economy
- Founded: 2016
- Founders: Maryellis Bunn; Manish Vora
- Headquarters: Manhattan, New York, United States
- Number of locations: New York City, Singapore, Chicago, Miami & Boston
- Parent: Figure8
- Website: www.museumoficecream.com

Museum of Ice Cream (MoIC) is an immersive or experiential museum brand, sometimes referred to as a selfie museum. It operates in several cities across the United States and also has a location in Singapore, which opened in August 2021.

Its locations and exhibits are aimed at providing fun and immersive experiences. All MoIC exhibits are presented with experimental design and color tones, with many exhibits color drenching in a vibrant color such as pink. In early 2026, it operates five locations with plans to open two more in Los Angeles and Las Vegas.

== History ==
MoIC was co-founded by Maryellis Bunn and Manish Vora in 2016. Bunn previously served as head of Forecasting and Innovation at Time, Inc and worked as an independent consultant on design and business strategy for various companies including Facebook. She partnered with Manish Vora, a former investment banker and former CEO of Lightbox. MoIC's parent company is Figure8 Inc., headquartered in New York. Initially self-funded by Bunn and Vora, the company started with a pop-up exhibit in New York's Meatpacking District in July 2016. Bunn drew insight for the company from her experience with and desire to reimagine American retail and traditional museums. MoIC has been described in publications as "...[playgrounds] with no age [limits]" and as an "interactive multi-sensory exhibit". Bunn has stated that rather than the term "museum," the portmanteau "experiums," a combination of experience and museum, better describes the company's offerings. After its inaugural pop-up in New York City, MoIC then opened further pop-up locations in Los Angeles in April 2017, San Francisco in September 2017, and Miami in December 2017.

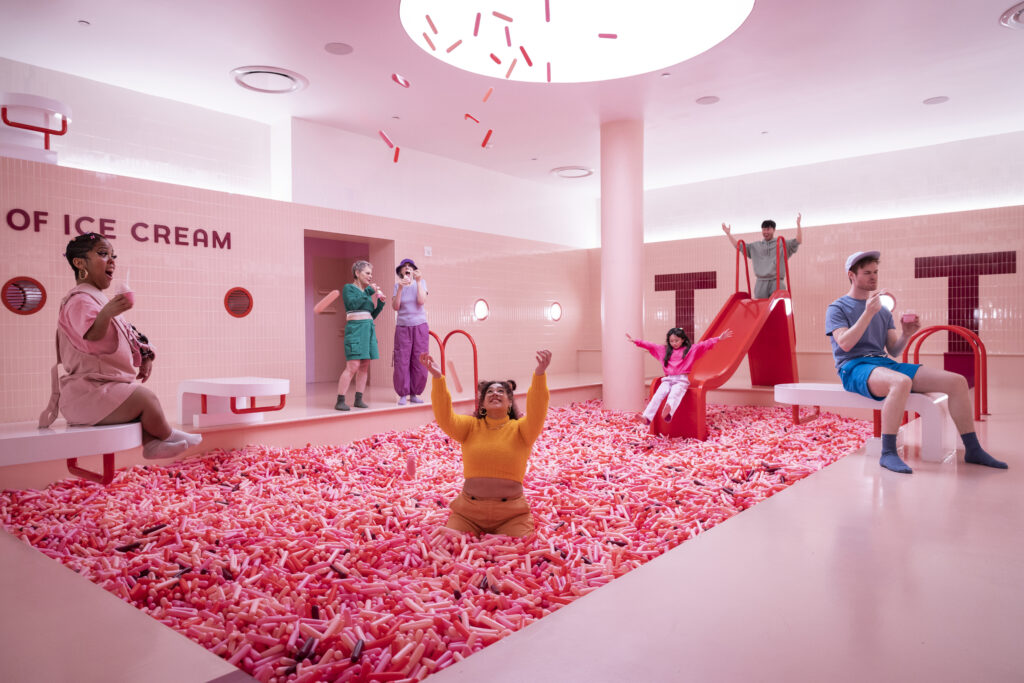
Museum of Ice Cream in 2022

The success of the San Francisco location led to its conversion to a permanent installation in September 2018 making it the first permanent site for the museum. The company had more than 1 million visitors across its various locations by the end of 2018. In August 2019, the company was valued at $200 million. received $40 million in Series A funding led by Elizabeth Ventures, and Maywic Select Investments. In December 2019, MoIC opened its first flagship permanent location in Soho, Manhattan.

In 2020, MoIC paused its operations due to the COVID-19 pandemic, reopening for normal operations in 2021. Prior to closing due to the social distancing and hygiene laws imposed during the pandemic, it had many celebrity visitors, including Beyonce and Kim Kardashian. It was also criticised for an exhibit supporting Black Lives Matter around the same time. Bunn issued an apology and MoIC repainted the plywood black and corrected the error. Criticisms of Bunn and MoIC fostering a hostile work environment were investigated. A spokesperson for the brand stated that protocols are in place to provide a healthy work environment for everyone. In April 2021, the Singapore Tourism Board announced that MoIC will be opening its first permanent overseas location in Singapore in August 2021. Exhibits at the Singapore location included special heritage themed attractions such as the "Dragon Playground". Also in August 2021, the MoIC opened a permanent location in Austin, Texas.

In July 2021 it was confirmed that as a result of pressures related to the COVID-19 pandemic the museum's permanent installation in San Francsico would be closing, making the San Francisco location the first permanent site to be shuttered. In July and August 2022 respectively, MoIC launched two new locations; the first a permanent location in Tribune Tower, Chicago and the second a pop up location in Shanghai, China.

In July and November 2023 respectively, it was announced that two new permanent locations would be opening in Miami and Boston. The Miami location officially opened at the Miami Worldcenter in September 2024 and the Boston location officially opened in December 2024.

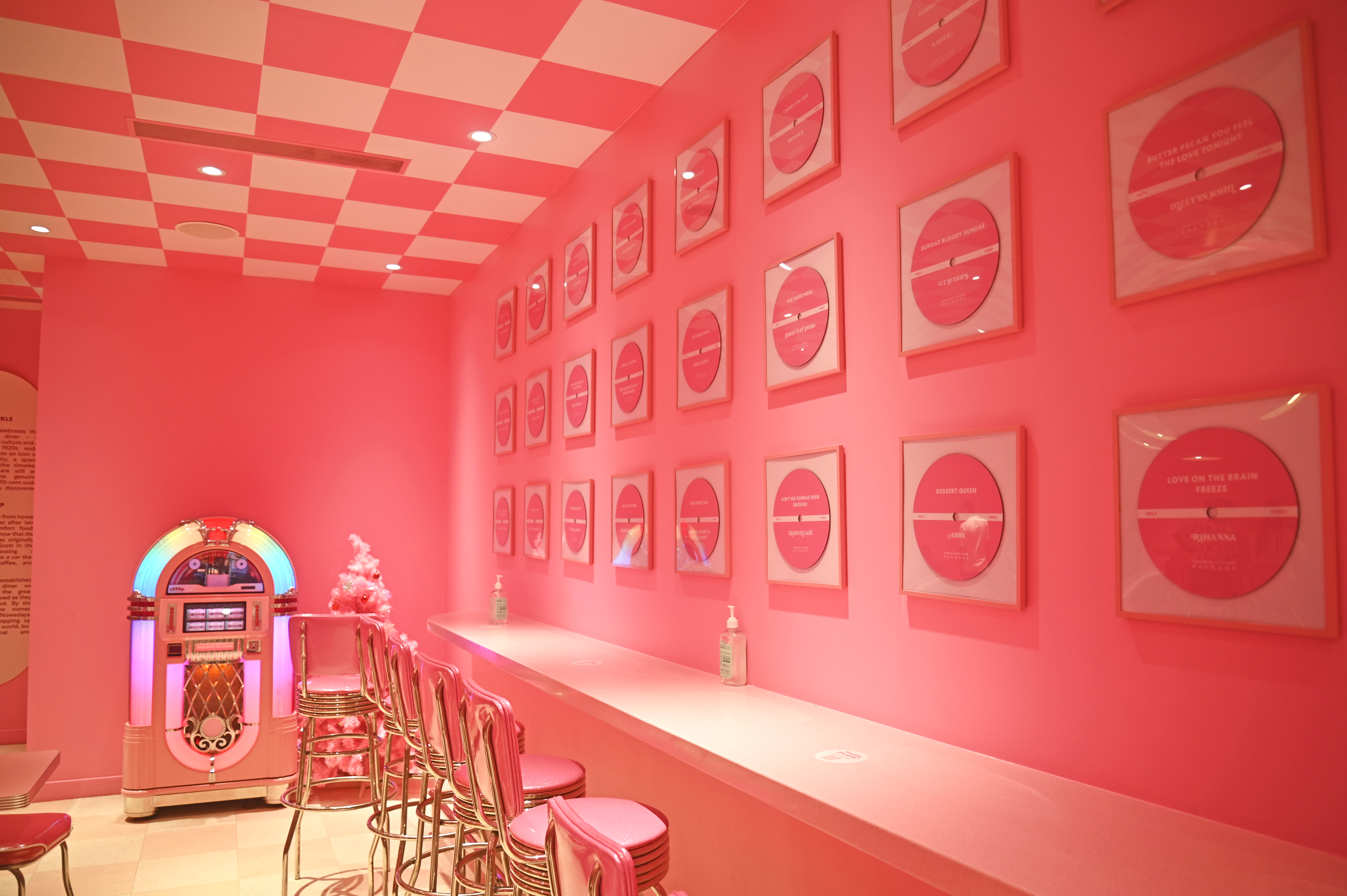
Scream's Diner at Museum of Ice Cream, Singapore

In July 2025 it was confirmed that its Austin site would be closing permanently when its lease agreement came to an end. During the same month, MOIC's New York location applied to extend its opening hours beyond the current 8pm closing time. It was hoped that by extending the opening hours, it would increase its exposure to the night time economy and diversify its visitors to compete with other late night museums . On July 20, 2025, MOIC Singapore announced that it would be giving a free cone of ice cream to any visitor on the day.

In January and September 2025 respectively, MoIC announced that it would be opening two more new permanent locations by the end of 2026; the first in Las Vegas's Area15 and the second in Los Angeles. The Los Angeles location is set to be the first fully ground up structure designed by MoIC. In late 2025, a third new opening was announced in the city of Orlando, expected to open its doors in 2026.

== Exhibits & products ==
MoIC offers visitors multi-room format of interactive installations at each of its locations, along with food options that include ice cream sampling.

It has expanded its presence beyond the museum experience by developing its own ice cream brand, featuring seven distinct flavors, available at Target starting in 2018. Flavors included Piñata, Sprinkle Pool, and Vanillionaire. Additionally, MOIC ice cream products were sold in Albertsons. While the company continues to produce its ice cream brand overseas, Target has discontinued selling MoIC products. MoIC has also ventured into other categories including children's apparel, a makeup line offered by Sephora, and other various merchandise products.

MOIC offering is based on different exhibits at sites, along with rotating or seasonal attractions. The Creamliner is an exhibit at some MOIC locations, which features a 1960s-style airline experience, mixing retro‑nostalgia with experiential design. Beginning in December each year, MOIC locations host an annual festive exhibit referred to as "Pinkmas." The exhibit includes a life-sized snow globe that visitors can walkthrough, a wishing tree, and festive-inspired ice creams.

== Current locations ==
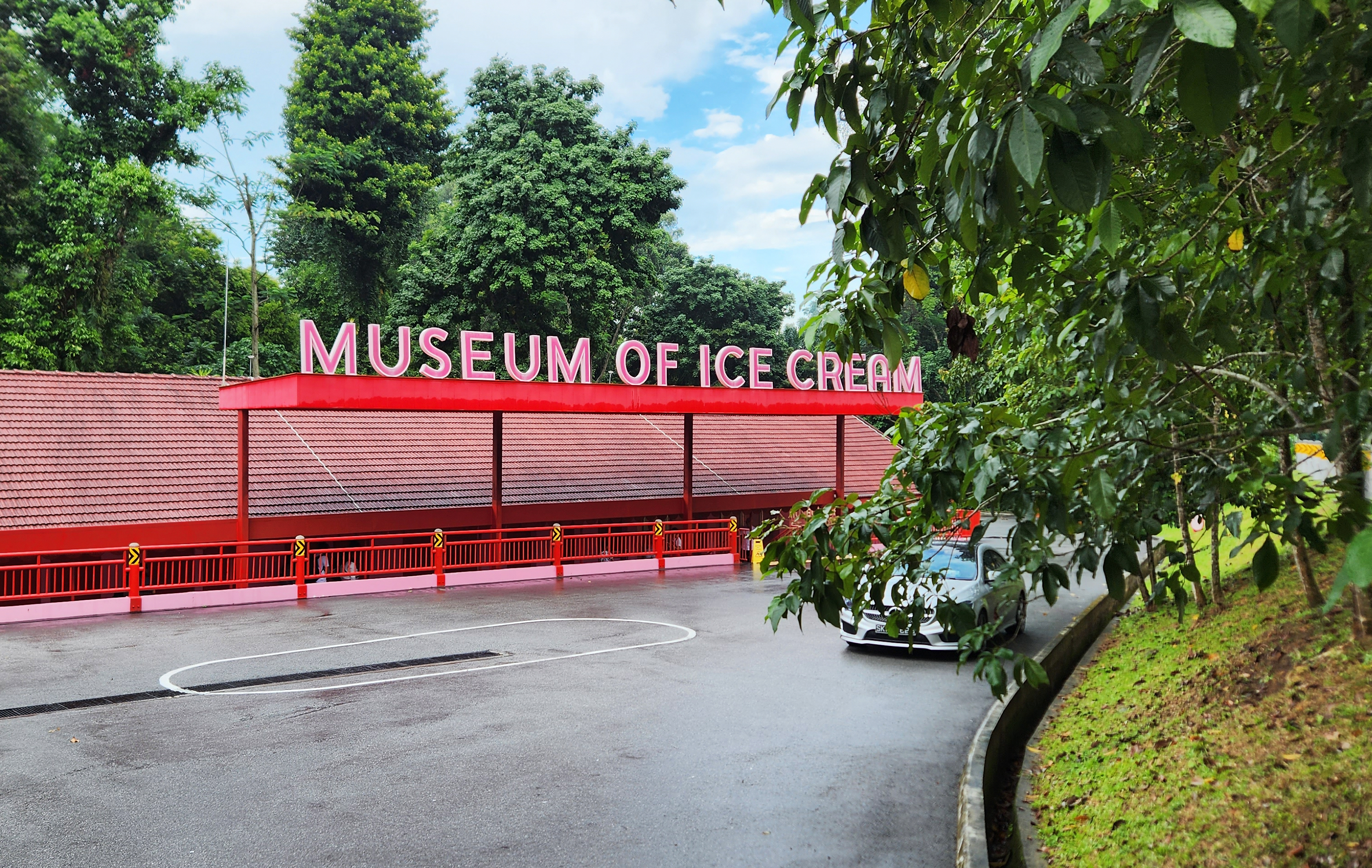
Museum of Ice Cream, Singapore, at Loewen Road.

City	Opening date	Address
SoHo, Manhattan	December 2019	558 Broadway, New York, NY, 10012
Singapore	August 2021	100 Loewen Road, Dempsey, Singapore 248837
Chicago	July 2022	435 Michigan Ave Suite G, Chicago, IL 60611
Miami	September 2024	851 NE 1st Ave, Miami, FL 33132
Boston	December 2024	121 Seaport Blvd, Boston, MA 02210

== Recognition ==
- 2018 Webby Awards, Webby Winner, Best Overall Social Presence - Brand
- 2018 Webby Awards, People's Voice Winner, Best Overall Social Presence - Brand
- 2018 Webby Awards, Nominee, Social Art & Culture
- Fast Company's Top 10 Most Innovative Companies in Live Events in 2018
