= Meatpacking District, Manhattan =

- Gansevoort Market Historic District
- U.S. National Register of Historic Places
- U.S. Historic district
- New York State Register of Historic Places
- New York City Landmark
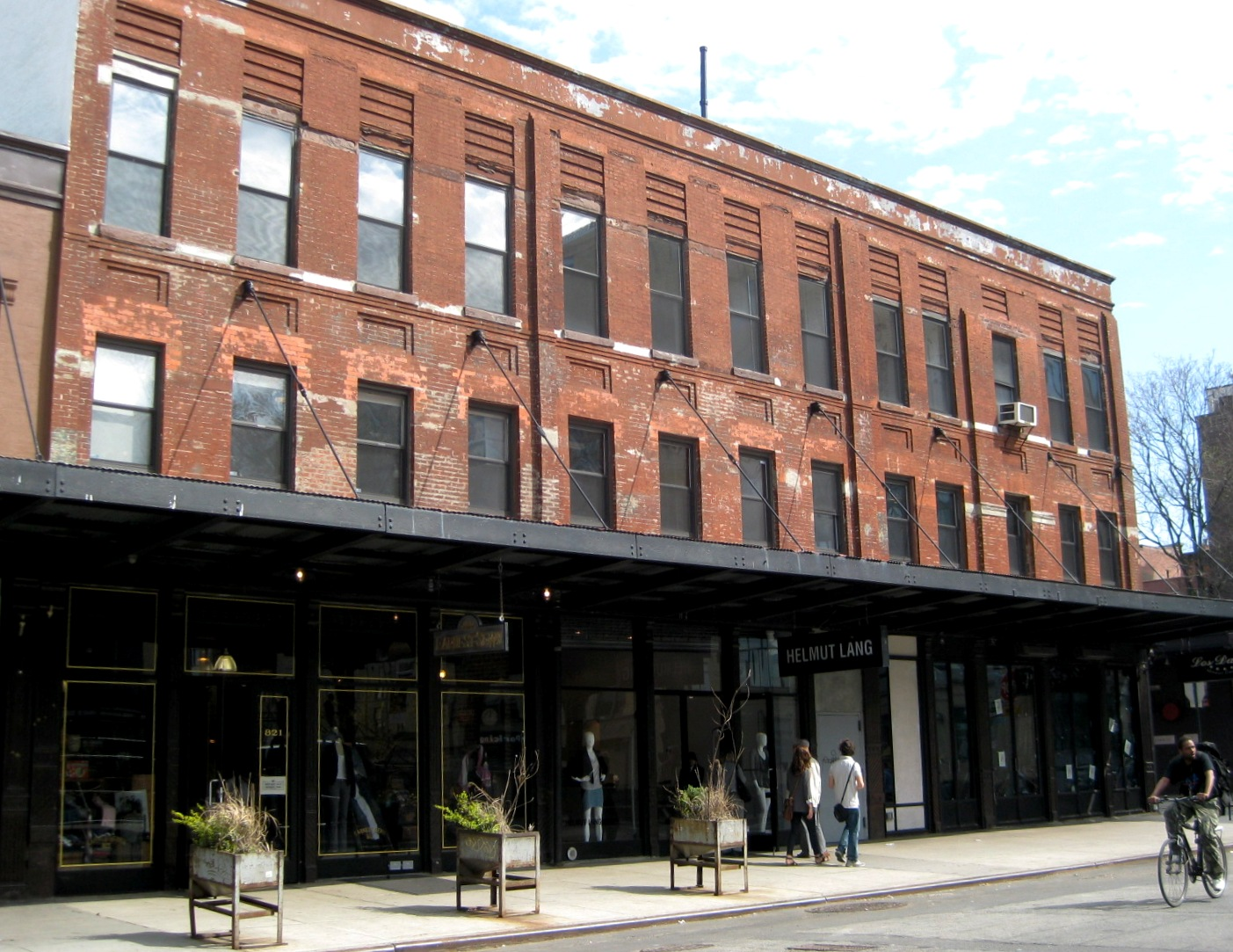
- An old meatpacking building converted into a boutique

- Location within Lower Manhattan Location within New York City Location within New York Location within the United States
- Location: Roughly bounded by West 16th Street to the north; Ninth Avenue, and Hudson Street to the east; Gansevoort Street to the south; and West Street and 11th Avenue to the west Manhattan, New York City
- Coordinates: 40°44′25″N 74°00′25″W
- Area: 44 acres (18 ha)
- Architect: various
- Architectural style: various
- NRHP reference No.: 07000487
- NYCL No.: 2132

Significant dates
- Added to NRHP: May 30, 2007
- Designated NYSRHP: April 9, 2007
- Designated NYCL: September 9, 2003

The Meatpacking District is a neighborhood in the New York City borough of Manhattan that runs from West 14th Street south to Gansevoort Street, and from the Hudson River east to Hudson Street. The Meatpacking Business Improvement District along with signage in the area, extend these borders farther north to West 17th Street, east to Eighth Avenue, and south to Horatio Street.

== History ==
=== Pre-colonial ===
A Lenape trading station called Sapohanikan was on the riverbank, which, accounting for landfill, was located about where Gansevoort Street meets Washington Street today. The footpath that led from Sapohanikan inland to the east became the foundation for Gansevoort Street, which by accident or design aligns, within one degree, so that the Manhattanhenge phenomenon, where the setting sun crosses the horizon looking down the street, occurs at the spring and autumnal equinoxes. In recognition of this history, petitions were made to call the 14th Street Park "Saphohanikan Park", although it appears no formal recognition was given.

=== Initial development ===
The earliest development of the area now known as the Meatpacking District came in the mid-19th century. Before that it was the location of Fort Gansevoort (Note: Named after Peter Gansevoort, a general in the Revolutionary War) and of the upper extension of Greenwich Village, which had been a vacation spot until overtaken by the northward movement of New York City. The irregular street patterns in the area resulted from the clash of the Greenwich Village street system with that of the Commissioners' Plan of 1811, which sought to impose a regular grid on the undeveloped part of Manhattan Island.

Construction of residences in the neighborhood – primarily rowhouses and town houses, some of which were later converted into tenements – began around 1840, primarily in the Greek Revival style which was prominent at the time. By mid-century, with Fort Gansevoort replaced by freight yards of the Hudson River Railroad, a neighborhood developed which was part heavy industry and part residential – a pattern which was more typical of an earlier period in the city's history but which was becoming less usual, as industry and residences began to be isolated in their own districts. In the western portion of the neighborhood, heavy industry such as iron works and a terra cotta manufacturer could be found, while lighter industry such as carpentry and woodworking, lumber yards, paint works, granite works and a plaster mill blended into the residential area. At the time of the Civil War the part of the district west of Ninth Avenue and Greenwich Street and above 10th Street was the location of numerous distilleries making turpentine and camphene, a lamp fuel.

=== After the Civil War ===
When development began again after the war in the 1870s, the tenor of the neighborhood changed. Since it was no longer considered a desirable area to live in, construction of single-family residences was replaced with the building of multiple-family dwellings, and the continued internal industrialization increased. In addition an elevated railroad line had been constructed through the neighborhood along Ninth Avenue and Greenwich Street, completed in 1869. Additional development began in the 1880s when two new markets began operating in the area. On the old freight yards, the Gansevoort Market (originally the "Farmer's Market"), an open-air space for the buying and selling of regional produce started in 1879, and the West Washington Market, 10 brick buildings used for meat, poultry and dairy transactions, relocated to the river side of West Street in 1884.

=== 20th century ===
By 1900 the area was home to 250 slaughterhouses and packing plants, and by the 1920s, what had been a neighborhood based on mixture of marketplaces became more tightly focused on meatpacking and related activities. Other industries continued to be located there, some of which included cigar-making, transportation-related businesses such as automobile repair, express services and garages, import-export firms, marine supplies, cosmetics, and printing. After decades of debate, the High Line elevated freight line was authorized in 1929 as part of the "West Side Improvement Plan", and the New York Central Railroad completed construction, passing through the neighborhood, in 1934.

The area's decline began around the 1960s as part of the general decline of the waterfront area. Containerization of freight, the advent of supermarkets which changed the distribution pattern for meat, dairy and produce from a locally or regionally based system to a more national one, and the development of frozen foods and refrigerated trucks to deliver them were all factors in this, but meatpacking continued to be the major activity in the neighborhood through the 1970s. At the same time, a new "industry" of nightclubs and other entertainment and leisure operations catering to a gay clientele, began to spring up in the area.

In the 1980s, as the industrial activities in the area continued their downturn, it became known as a center for drug dealing and prostitution. Concurrent with the rise in illicit sexual activity, the sparsely populated industrial area became the focus of the city's burgeoning BDSM subculture; over a dozen sex clubs flourished in the area including such notable ones as The Anvil, The Manhole, the Mineshaft, and the heterosexual-friendly Hellfire Club. Many of these establishments were under the direct control of the Mafia or subject to New York Police Department protection rackets. The Mineshaft was forcibly shuttered by the city in 1985 at the height of AIDS preventionism.

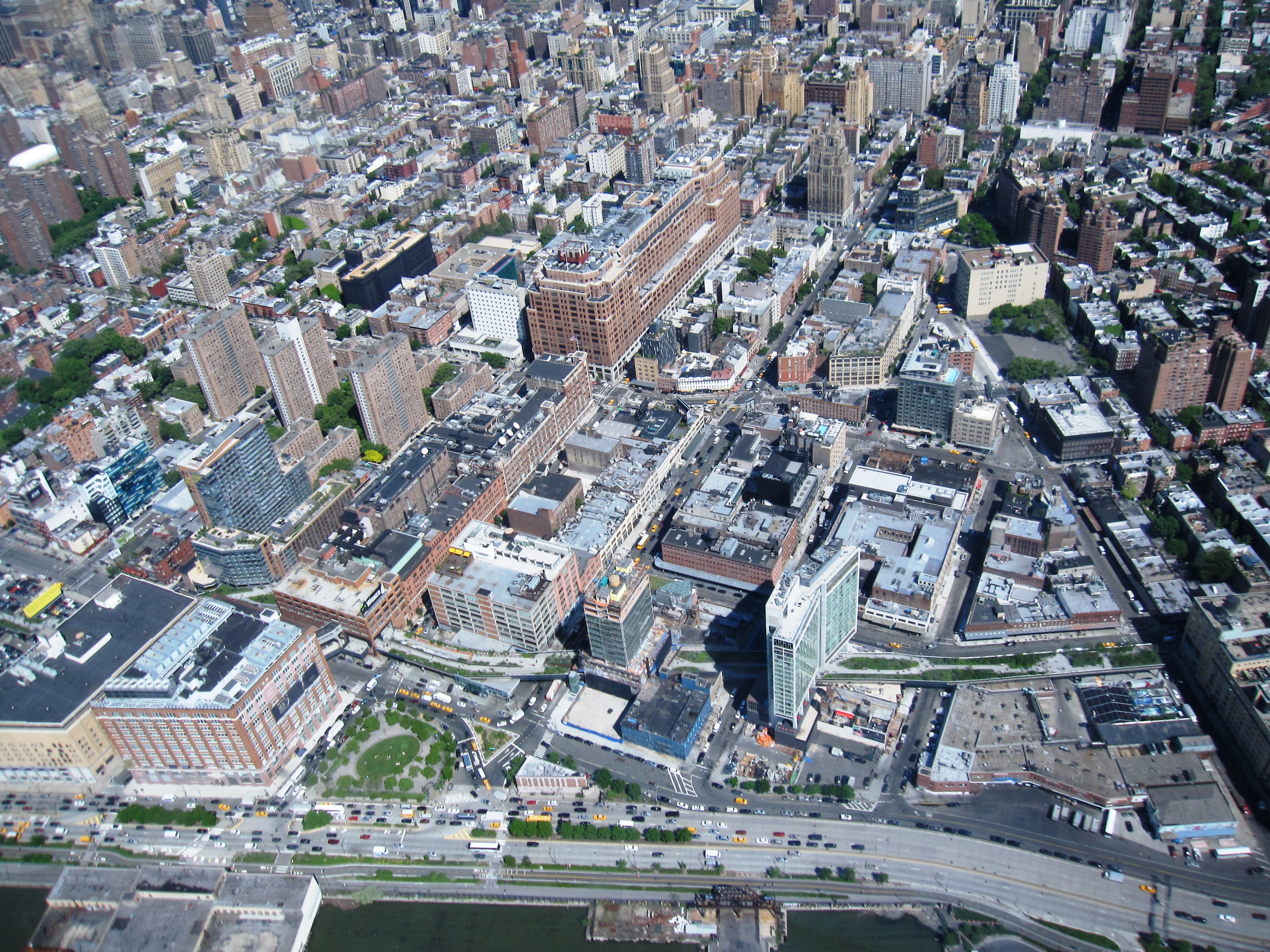
Aerial view

=== Resurgence ===
Beginning in the late 1990s, the Meatpacking District went through a transformation. High-end boutiques catering to young professionals and hipsters opened, including Diane von Fürstenberg, Christian Louboutin, Alexander McQueen, Stella McCartney, Barbour, Rubin & Chapelle, Theory, Ed Hardy, Puma, Moschino, ADAM by Adam Lippes, and an Apple Store; restaurants such as Pastis—which closed in 2014—and 5 Ninth; and nightclubs such as Tenjune. In 2004, New York magazine called the Meatpacking District "New York's most fashionable neighborhood".

A catalyst for even greater transformation of the area was the opening in June 2009 of the first segment of the High Line linear park. A former elevated freight railroad built under the aegis of Robert Moses, it opened to great reviews in the District (and in Chelsea to the north) as a greenway modeled after Paris's Promenade Plantée. Thirteen months earlier, the Whitney Museum of American Art had announced that it would build a second home, designed by Renzo Piano, at 99 Gansevoort Street, just west of Washington Street and adjacent to the southernmost entrance to the High Line; and on May 1, 2015, the museum opened at this site. These were turning points in the changes experienced by the neighborhood over the first two decades of the 21st century, transforming it from a gritty manufacturing district into a bustling high-end retail, dining, and residential area, as documented by photographer Brian Rose in his 2014 book Metamorphosis.

In 2021, during the COVID-19 pandemic, the outdoor theatre production Seven Deadly Sins was staged in the area. Each play was performed in an empty shopfront. Audience members used headsets to hear the sound and dialogue. Seven writers responded to a different deadly sin: MJ Kaufman; Ngozi Anyanwu, Thomas Bradshaw, Moisés Kaufman (who also directed the show), Jeffrey LaHoste, Ming Peiffer and Bess Wohl; the addressed the respective sins of pride, gluttony, sloth, greed, envy, wrath and lust. Variety reviewed the show as a "well-curated, innovative theatrical experience [that] stretches the limits of traditional performance".

=== Preservation ===
In September 2003, the New York City Landmarks Preservation Commission (LPC) established the Gansevoort Market Historic District, and in 2007 New York State Parks Commissioner Carol Ash approved adding the entire Meatpacking District, an area which included both the Gansevoort Market Historic District and the neighborhood's waterfront, to the New York State and National Registers of Historic Places. The state district was listed on the National Register on May 30, 2007, and included 140 buildings, two structures, and one other site.

Structures such as The Standard, High Line, hotel and the Whitney Museum opened in the Meatpacking District during the 21st century. By 2024, there was only one meatpacking business remaining in the area, the Gansevoort Meat Market. The city government announced plans in 2025 for Gansevoort Square, a development with 600 apartments and several stores, which would replace the Gansevoort Meat Market. The same year, part of 14th Street in the Meatpacking District was narrowed to create a pedestrian plaza.

== Gallery ==
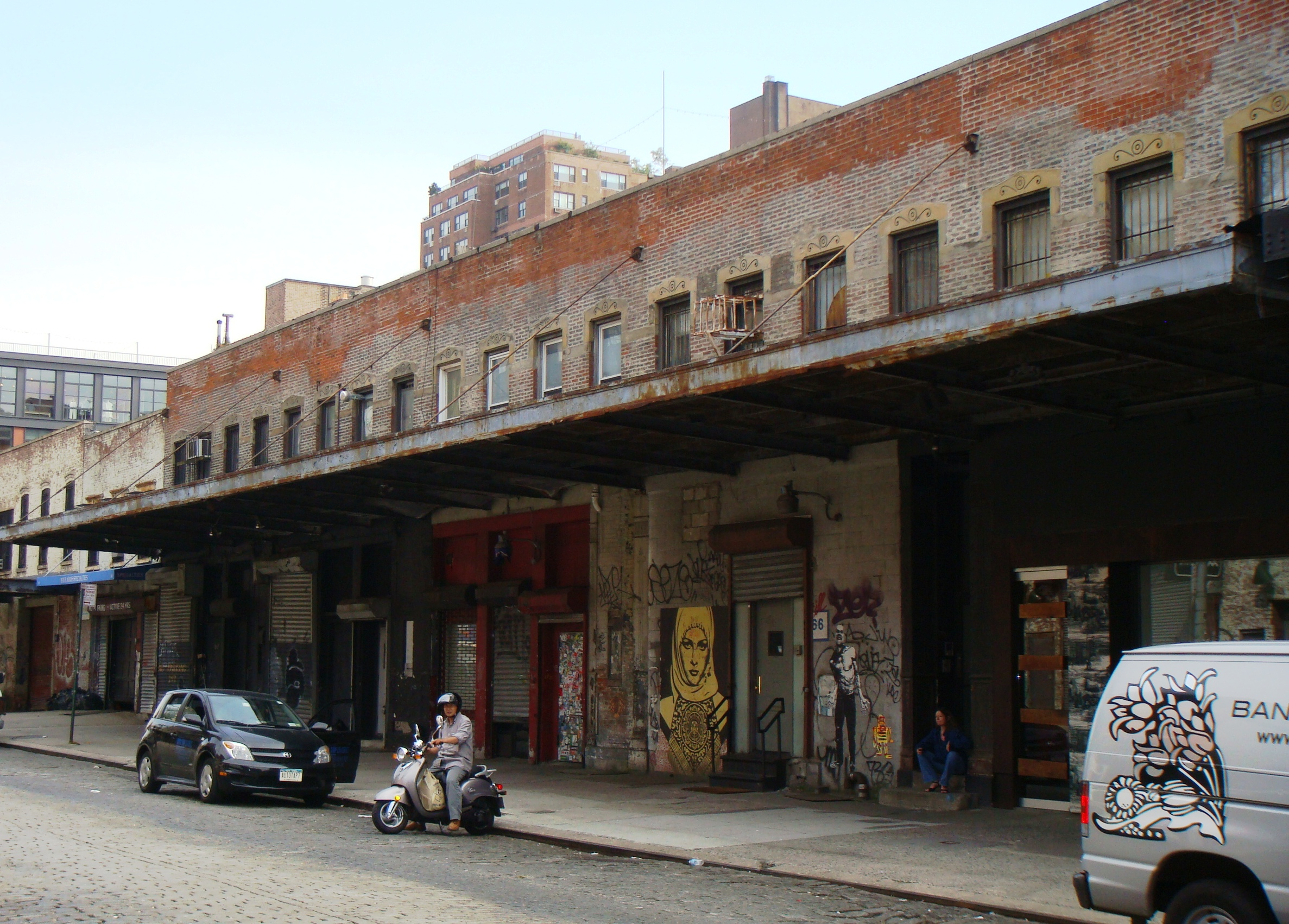
Before gentrification, many meatpacking buildings had become derelict

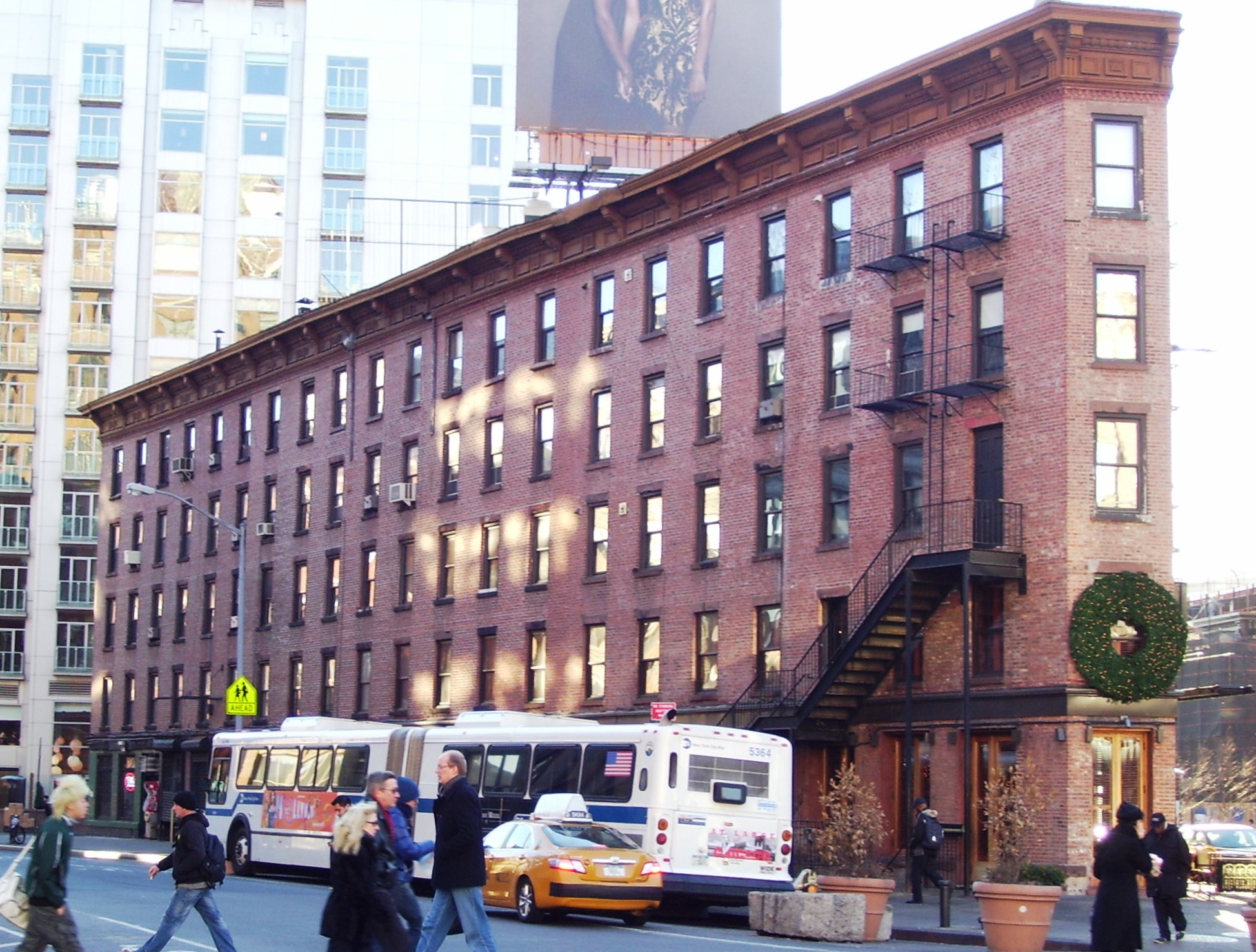
The Herring Safe & Lock Company Building (1849) at the intersection of Ninth Avenue and Hudson Street at 14th Street

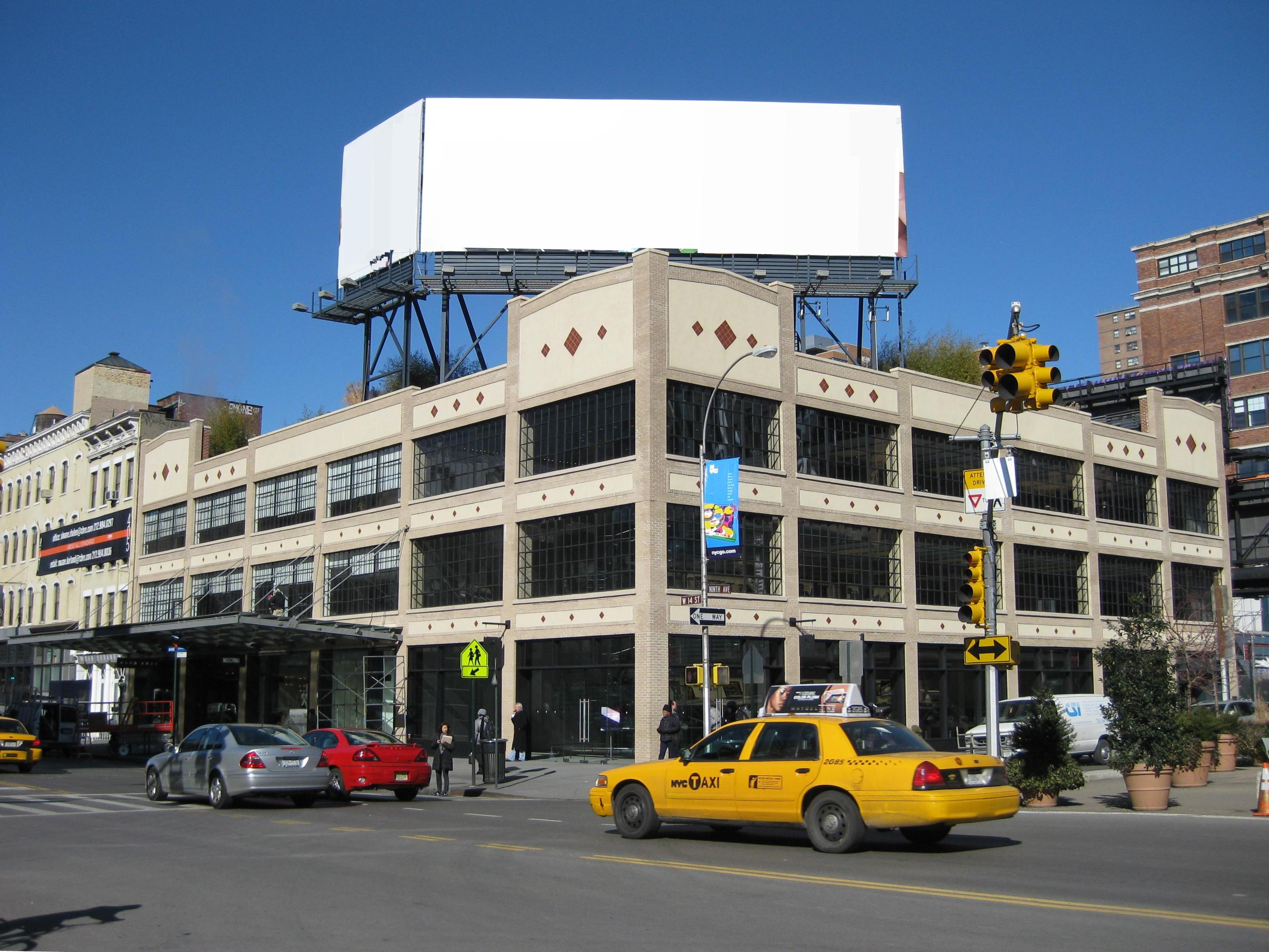
The Apple Store at 14th Street and Ninth Avenue

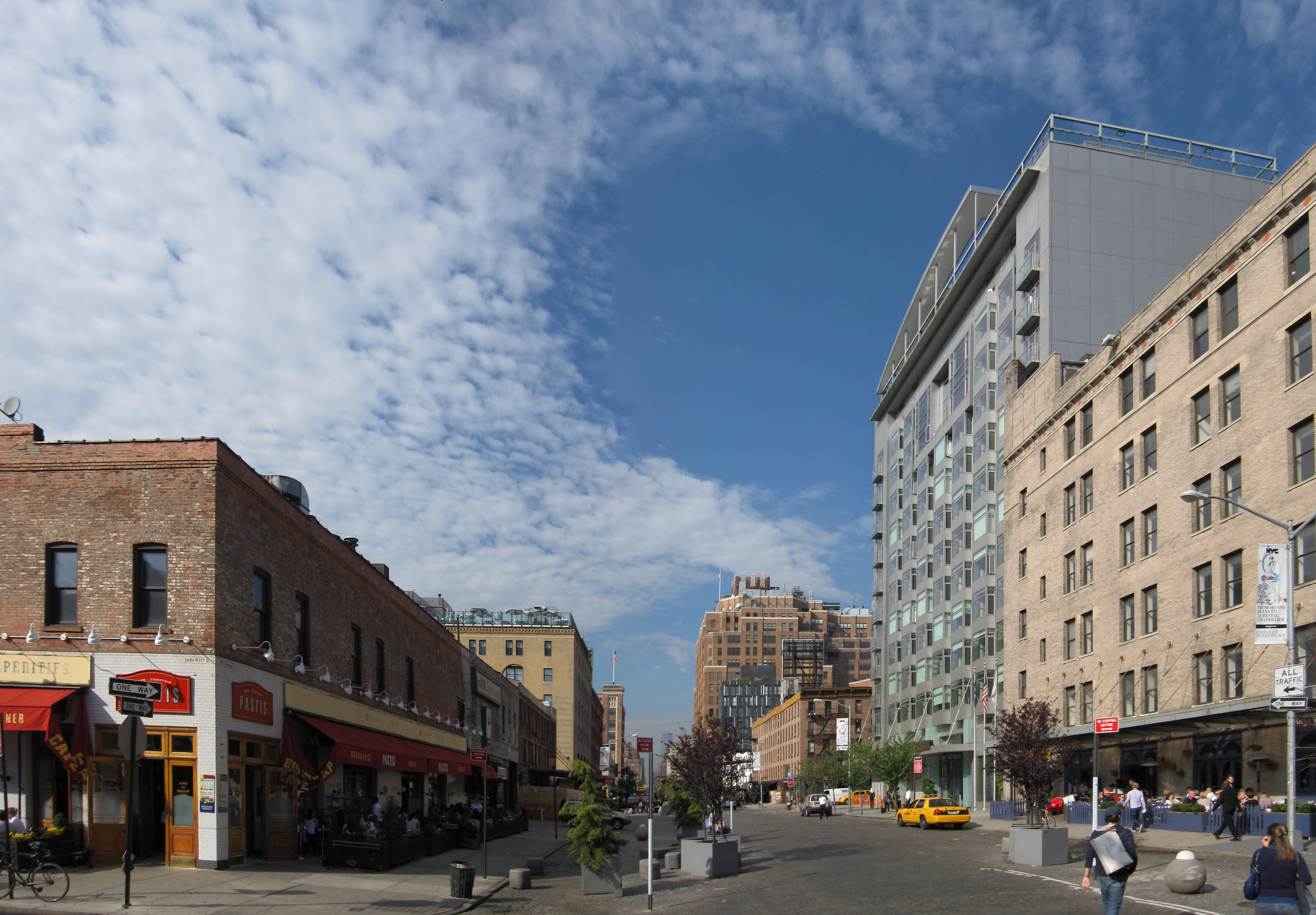
Hotel Gansevoort (right) and Pastis (left) on Ninth Avenue

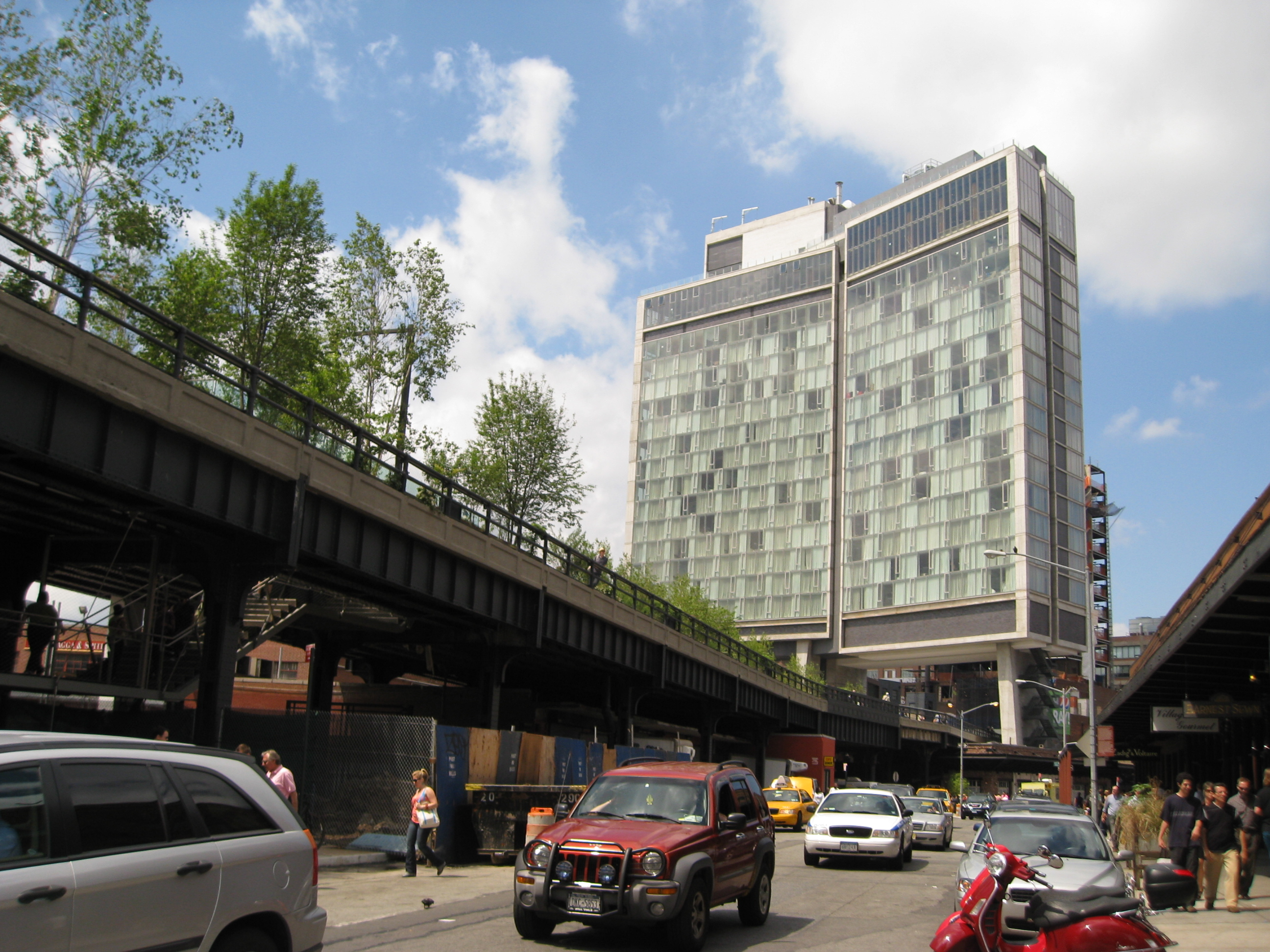
The Standard Hotel above the High Line

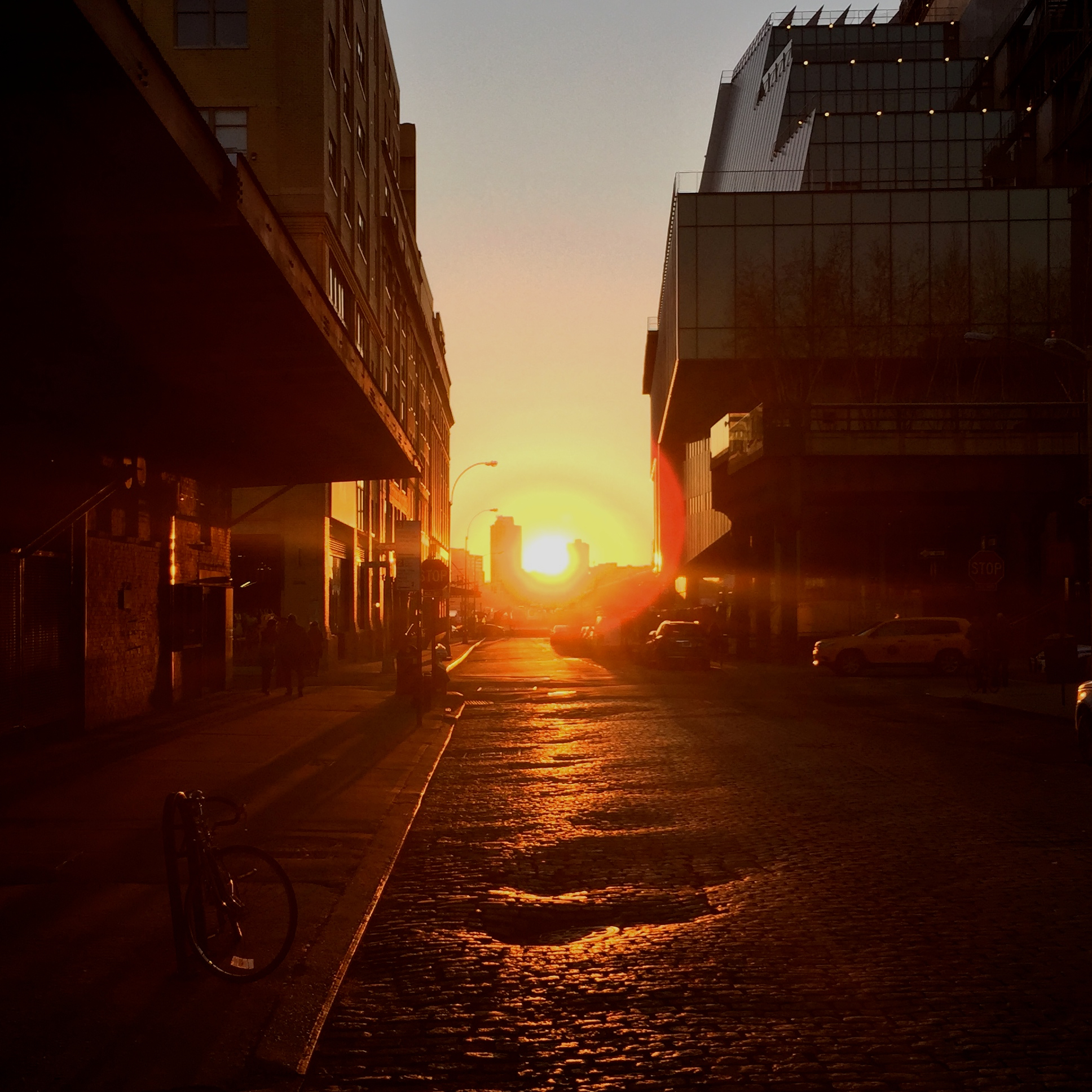
Gansevoort Street is almost perfectly aligned to the Spring equinox

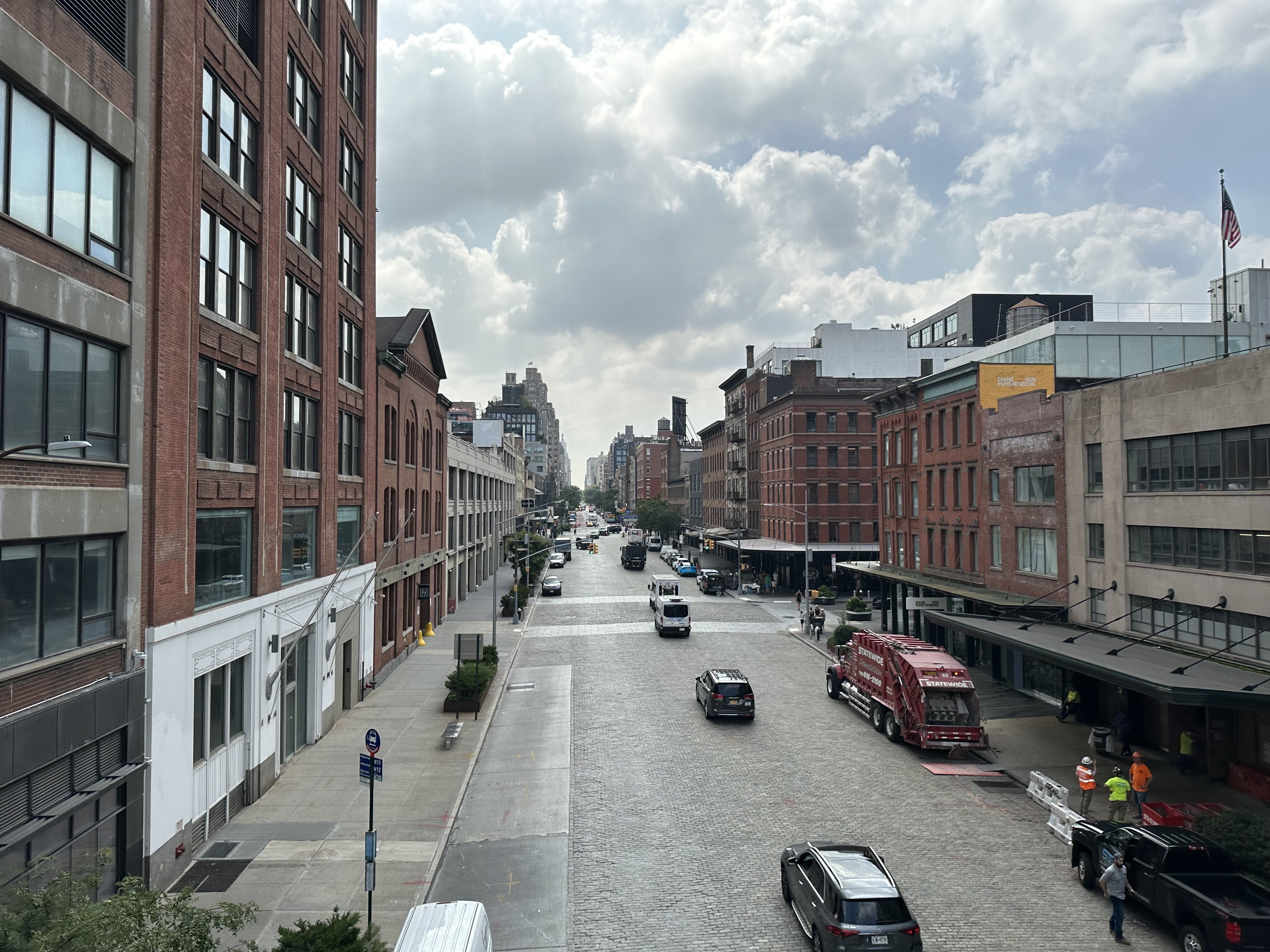
View of West 14th St from The High Line

== See also ==
- Chelsea, Manhattan
- Greenwich Village
- High Line (New York City)
- The Standard, High Line
