= Whiteley (surname) =

Whiteley is a surname. Notable people with the surname include:

- Aliya Whiteley (born 1974), British novelist
- Andrew John Whiteley (1947–2014), English chess master
- Arkie Whiteley (1964–2001), Australian actress who appeared in television and films
- Arthur Whiteley (1916-2013), American zoologist
- Bobby Whiteley (1870-1938), English rugby union player
- Brian Andrew Whiteley (born 1983), American visual artist
- Brett Whiteley (1939–1992), Australian artist
- Brett Whiteley (politician) (born 1960), Australian politician and a member of the Liberal Party in Tasmania
- Cecil Whiteley (1875-1942), English judge
- Charles Whiteley (1885–?), English footballer
- David Whiteley (born 1977), British BBC TV presenter
- Eli L. Whiteley (1913–1986), first lieutenant in the US Army, received the Medal of Honor for his actions in Sigolsheim, France during World War II
- Eric Whiteley (1904-1973), English rugby union player
- Frank Y. Whiteley, Jr., (1915–2008), racehorse trainer
- Garett Whiteley (born 1980), American mixed martial artist
- George Whiteley, 1st Baron Marchamley PC (1855–1925), Liberal Party politician in the United Kingdom
- Greg Whiteley (born 1969), American executive producer
- Helen Riaboff Whiteley (1921-1990), Chinese-American microbiologist
- Jenny Whiteley (born 1971), Canadian country and folk singer-songwriter
- John Whiteley (disambiguation), multiple people
- Johnny Whiteley (1930-2022), English former rugby league footballer and coach
- Jon Whiteley (1945-2020), Scottish actor and art historian
- Ken Whiteley (born 1951), Canadian-American multi-instrumentalist
- Laurence Whiteley (born 1991), British rower
- Lee Whiteley (born 1989), British sprinter
- Lisa Whiteley (born 1993), Australian rules footballer
- Lynda Whiteley (born 1963), English former athlete
- Mark Whiteley (born 1962), American editor
- Martha Annie Whiteley (1866–1956), English chemist
- Opal Whiteley (1897–1992), nature writer and diarist
- Peter Whiteley (disambiguation), multiple people
- Richard Whiteley (disambiguation), multiple people
- Ross Whiteley (born 1988), English cricketer
- Sheila Whiteley (1941–2015), English musicologist
- Tom Whiteley (born 1995), English rugby union player
- Walter Whiteley, Canadian mathematician
- Warren Whiteley (born 1987), South African rugby player
- Wendy Whiteley OAM (born 1941), Australian artist and cultural icon
- Wilfrid Whiteley (1882–1970), British Labour Party politician
- William G. Whiteley (1819–1886), United States Representative from Delaware
- William Henry Whiteley (1834–1903), inventor best known for the cod trap which he invented in 1865
- William Whiteley, (1831–1907), British entrepreneur of the late nineteenth and early twentieth centuries
- William Whiteley (politician), CH, DL (1881–1955), the Labour Member of Parliament for Blaydon in County Durham, England
