= Extreme Makeover: Homer Edition =

- The Simpsons episode
- Promotional poster for the episode
- Episode no.: Season 37
- Directed by: Matthew Nastuk (Part 1); Timothy Bailey (Part 2)
- Written by: Michael Price (Part 1); Nick Dahan (Part 2)
- Production codes: 36ABF20 (Part 1); 36ABF21 (Part 2)
- Original release date: June 17, 2026

Guest appearances
- Betty Gilpin as Amy, Lenny's girlfriend; Jon Hamm as himself; Laufey as herself; Tegan and Sara as themselves

Episode features
- Chalkboard gag: "I will not hit the 'skip intro' button"
- Couch gag: At the grocery store, Marge grabs an Omega Cola bottle, and is transported via portals to various locations. In the real world, people dressed as Otto build an art installation of the Simpson family, who pour Omega drinks on themselves.

Episode chronology
← Previous "Homer? A Cracker Bro?"	Next → "Simpsley"
- The Simpsons season 37

"Extreme Makeover: Homer Edition" is a two-part episode and the first special of the thirty-seventh season of the American animated television series The Simpsons. The 806th and 807th episodes overall, it was released as a special episode exclusively on the streaming service Disney+, on June 17, 2026. The special was written by Michael Price and Nick Dahan, and directed by Matthew Nastuk and Timothy Bailey.

The series follows the dysfunctional Simpson family, consisting of patriarch Homer (Dan Castellaneta), matriarch Marge (Julie Kavner), son Bart (Nancy Cartwright), oldest daughter Lisa (Yeardley Smith), and youngest Maggie, as they live out their misadventures in the town of Springfield. In the episode, after Homer acts irresponsibly with the kids while on a date night with Marge, she imagines him with three different personalities.

The episode's double-length anthology format came from Matt Selman, who had wanted to do such a thing for a while, and incorporated it into the episode. Meow Wolf worked with the series' crew to create the episode's couch gag sequence, after Selman had visited their exhibits. A reference to deceased co-founder of Meow Wolf, Matt King, was added into the episode to honor him. Upon release, the episode received generally positive reviews from critics. The couch gag received notable attention by critics, and was hailed as a highlight of both the episode and recent seasons of the series.

== Plot ==
Homer Simpson (Dan Castellaneta) and his wife Marge (Julie Kavner) prepare for a date night with their friends Lenny and Carl, along with their respective girlfriends. Marge goes to the restaurant while Homer waits for their kids' babysitter. At the restaurant, Marge is initially nervous, but quickly fits in. When the babysitter arrives injured, Homer turns her away and leaves the kids unattended on the front lawn, watching them through a doorbell camera. He goes to the restaurant, and, seeing what Homer has done through the camera, Marge yells at him and sends him home. Upset, she wishes Homer could be different.

Marge daydreams about Homer as a reckless fighter pilot who repeatedly gets his wingmen killed, and is ordered to undergo psychological evaluation with Marge, who is a therapist in the fantasy. While they fall in love with each other, Homer realizes he has a fear of being afraid. When Homer must lead a dangerous mission, Marge flies with him in another plane to distract him from his fear. Homer is successful, but his wingmen, including Marge, are killed.

In reality, Marge sees on her phone that Homer left his house keys at the restaurant, which leaves him and the kids trapped outside. She again daydreams, this time imagining Homer as a 1950s businessman. After being rejected at an executive meeting, he goes home to his wife, Helen Lovejoy (Maggie Roswell). She encourages him to get a promotion by attending his boss' party. Feeling spiritually unsatisfied, he meets Marge, an artist who works the bar at the party. She shows him new music and art, and they fall in love. Planning to run away with her, he goes home to pack, before hearing he got the promotion. Marge waits at the bus station, but Homer goes on the train to his new job instead.

Back in reality, Marge does not want to go home yet and drinks at Moe's Tavern, where she imagines Homer without anger issues. In a rundown city, Homer has a laughing disorder, and his hero is Krusty the Clown (Castellaneta). Homer gets a job as a clown, but he is constantly abused, and is soon hospitalized. He then has a breakdown and kills a hospital donor. He is sent to an asylum and meets Margeley Quinn, and they fall in love. After escaping, they lead a clown mob to Krusty's studio and kill him, but the mob kills them, too. Marge realizes that none of these fantasy versions of Homer are to her liking. Going home, Marge finds the family in the treehouse. Homer apologizes and she says that he is perfect for her the way he is.

== Production ==
The special was written by Michael Price and Nick Dahan, and directed by Matthew Nastuk and Timothy Bailey. Betty Gilpin and Jon Hamm guest starred in the episode as Amy and himself, respectively. Musicians Laufey and Tegan and Sara also appear, singing music in the episode. Hamm previously guest starred in the twenty-second season episode "Donnie Fatso", as a different character, an FBI supervisor. The idea for a double-length anthology episode was one that executive producer Matt Selman had long wanted to do. Instead of taking the time to do six segments, Selman opted to make each of the three segments longer—where they are around eight minutes long instead of the usual four to six minutes—and spent more time working on the story for the wraparounds, which he considered to be "a full episode" almost separate from the three segments.

The logo for Omega Mart, featured in the episode's couch gag through an official collaboration with Meow Wolf.

The episode's couch gag was created in partnership with the entertainment company Meow Wolf, known for creating surreal art. Emily Montoya, co-founder of Meow Wolf, called working on the scene to be an "honor", with the couch gag directly paying homage to Omega Mart, an art exhibit created by the company. According to Montoya, Selman was entirely supportive of their vision for the couch gag, as was the rest of The Simpsons' crew. She was particularly grateful for them letting her honor Matt King, the deceased co-founder of Meow Wolf, who is given a cameo designed to "encapsulat[e] Matt King's rainbow wizard essence", depicting him sharing a drink with recurring character Barney Gumble. Selman was already a fan of Omega Mart, claiming to have spent hours walking through the exhibit when he visited it in Las Vegas. After visiting some of their other exhibits in Santa Fe, New Mexico and Denver, Selman got the idea to have the company do work for The Simpsons. He was not part of the majority of production other than giving the team directions in Zoom calls, and found the final product to be "superbly joyful". According to Price, the art style of the second segment of the episode, titled "The Company Man", was based on 1950s advertising artwork, such as pieces by Bob Peak, and the animation of the "beatnik" segments—a montage where Homer and Marge travel through a series of stylized works of art—took inspiration from Jules Feiffer's style.

== Release and reception ==
"Extreme Makeover: Homer Edition" was officially announced in May 2026, along with two other special episodes of The Simpsons, all of which were set to premiere exclusively on the American streaming service Disney+ over the summer, being considered specials and not standard episodes. The episode was released on the service on June 17, 2026, as a double-length special. It was the first of the three streaming-exclusive episodes of the season to be released, also being the fourth official Disney+ exclusive episode for the series, following "O C'mon All Ye Faithful", "The Past and the Furious", and "Yellow Planet". Both parts of the special made up the 806th and 807th episodes of the series overall.

TheWrap writer Alex Welch recommended the special as one of the eight best things to stream for that week, making note of the guest stars, and stating that it works well for "die-hard" fans of the series. Zach Moser of ScreenRant praised the couch gag as one of the series' best in years, noting it for having sight gags meant for Meow Wolf fans to spot, along with ones that viewers unfamiliar with their work can appreciate. Moser considered it to be one of the best works to come out of the series' decision to allow guest animators to work on episode couch gags, a tradition that had started years prior, finishing off his review by asserting that the scene "demands repeat viewings […] and it pays to go frame by frame to find motifs, references to the series, and tiny gags stuck in every corner." ComicBook.com's Evan Valentine considered the crossover between Meow Wolf and The Simpsons to be "unbelievable", also praising the segment parodying the Joker for "re-imagining [him] in some surprising ways".
