= Whiteley (disambiguation) =

Whiteley is a community near Fareham in the county of Hampshire, England.

Whiteley may also refer to:

- Whiteley (surname)
- Whiteley Bank, small village or hamlet on the Isle of Wight, England, UK
- Whiteley Township, Pennsylvania, a township in Greene County, Pennsylvania, U.S.
- Whiteley Village, in Hersham, Surrey, England, provides homes for needy elderly people
- Whiteley Wood Hall, a stately home built by Alexander Ashton
- Whiteley Primary School, a state-school near Fareham, Hampshire, England, UK
- 18839 Whiteley (1999 PG), a main-belt asteroid
- Brett Whiteley Travelling Art Scholarship, an Australian annual art award
- Whiteley Peak in Colorado, USA

== See also ==
- Huntington-Whiteley, a surname
- Whiteleys, a shopping mall in Queensway, London, England, UK
- Learoyd v Whiteley (1886), an English trusts law case
