= Radio Tave =

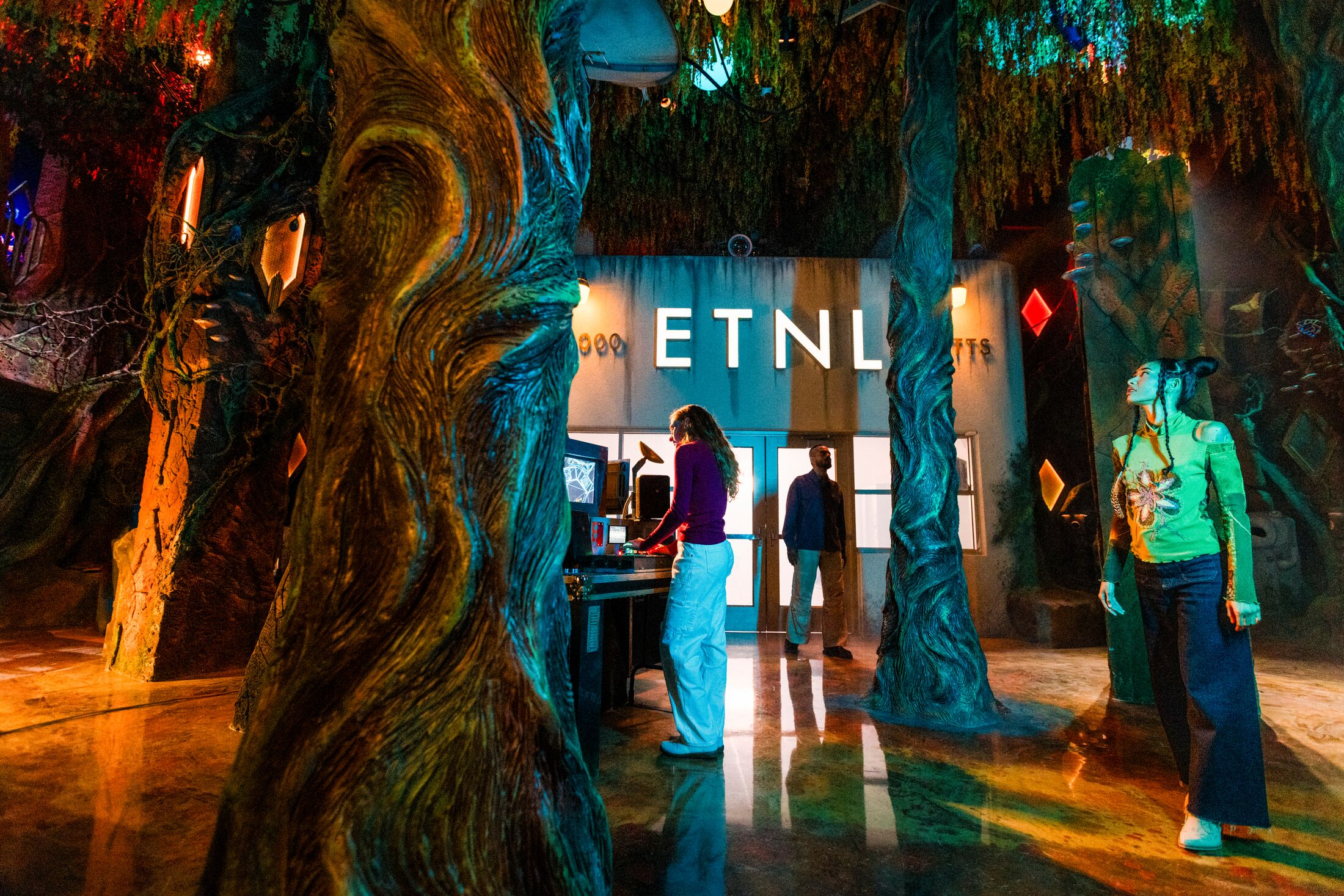
- Inside Radio Tave in Houston's Fifth Ward
- Interactive map of the Radio Tave area

General information
- Type: Immersive art exhibition
- Location: Houston, Texas, United States, 2103 Lyons Ave, Building 2, Houston, TX 77020
- Coordinates: 29°46′20″N 95°20′52″W
- Opened: October 31, 2024
- Owner: Meow Wolf

Website
- meowwolf.com/visit/houston

Radio Tave is an immersive art exhibition in Houston, Texas, created by the American arts and entertainment company Meow Wolf. It opened to the public on October 31, 2024, as Meow Wolf's fifth permanent exhibition and its second in Texas.

The exhibition is themed as an interdimensional community radio station, “ETNL,” and is located within a redeveloped early-20th-century industrial complex in Houston's Fifth Ward.

== History and development ==
Meow Wolf announced plans for a Houston exhibition in 2022 and broke ground in 2023 at 2103 Lyons Avenue, part of the Moncrief–Lenoir warehouse complex being redeveloped as the Warehouse District by The Deal Company. The exhibition occupies a portion of the multi-building site, which has been adapted for entertainment and cultural uses.

On September 10, 2024, the opening date and the “explorable radio station” concept were announced. In the weeks leading up to opening day, outlets published preview features with details on location, themes, and participating artists.

Radio Tave opened on October 31, 2024, following preview coverage by local and national outlets.

== Design and features ==
Radio Tave presents a narrative about a radio station displaced into another dimension, with visitors able to explore dozens of rooms and environments connected by passages, portals, and interactive elements. Coverage notes the installation's sound-led approach; hundreds of speakers create an atmospheric soundtrack and certain objects trigger music and other effects.

More than 100 artists contributed to the exhibition, including many from Houston and across Texas; coverage also highlights Cowboix Hevvven, an in-universe bar and restaurant within the exhibition.

== Location ==
The exhibition is situated at 2103 Lyons Avenue (Building 2) in Houston's Fifth Ward, within a historic industrial property formerly associated with Moncrief–Lenoir Manufacturing that has been converted to mixed-use cultural space.

== Programming ==
In addition to regular admission, the venue has hosted ticketed after-hours or 21+ events under rotating themes.

== Labor ==
In July 2025, employees at the Houston location announced a unionization effort with the Communications Workers of America, joining similar efforts at other Meow Wolf sites.

== Reception ==
Preview coverage noted the exhibition's Fifth Ward context, its sound-driven approach, and contributions from local artists. Time Out Houston described Radio Tave as a “multisensory experience” featuring “dozens of rooms,” noting that roughly half the contributing artists were from Texas.

Writers discussed the Fifth Ward setting and the radio-station conceit. Artnet News described the project as an “art-filled, interdimensional adventure,” while the Houston Chronicle emphasized the sound-first design and the artist roster; the Texas arts journal Glasstire published a discussion shortly after opening.

== See also ==
- Meow Wolf
- House of Eternal Return
- Omega Mart
- Convergence Station
- The Real Unreal
