= Frank Wo/Men Collective =

American theater and dance group

- Formation: 2017
- Type: Theater and dance collective
- Location: Austin, Texas
- Members: Kelsey Oliver, Alexa Capareda, Roberto Di Donato, Chris Conard
- Website: www.frankwomencollective.com (offline)

Frank Wo/Men Collective is an American theater and dance collective based in Austin, Texas. Members include artists from Austin, New York City, and Santa Fe, and the collective creates and produces new pieces of theater in the Austin community. According to an article published by Arts and Culture Texas, "Frank Wo/Men is the love-child of four individuals: movers Kelsey Oliver and Alexa Capareda, theater artist Roberto Di Donato, and technical designer Chris Conard." Frank Wo/Men aims to: “create, generate, and develop ideas, recognizing that novelty and innovation are fruits of risk-taking; harness the rawness of artistic impulse and the spontaneity of cross-discipline collaborations; and connect with diverse communities and produce work that is socio-culturally attentive.”

== History ==
Loose Gravel was Frank Wo/Men Collective's debut show, January 2017. The collective was immediately hailed by Fjord Review's Jonelle Seitz as "Contemplative, skilled, inventive, and often hilarious." Frank Benge of BroadwayWorld deemed the collective's premiere show as, "raw, edgy, and occasionally brilliant.", In an article published in American Theatre Magazine, The Rude Mechs discussed their production of Not Every Mountain in which they, "first looked to dancers from a physical theatre performance they'd seen in Austin in January, Loose Gravel, by Frank Wo/Men Collective" in seeking new collaborators. This production of Not Every Mountain has been seen at the Guthrie Theatre in Minneapolis, Minnesota.

Frank Wo/Men Collective was nominated for "Best Dance Ensemble" by the Austin Critics Table Awards for the 2017–2018 season and again for "Best Dance Ensemble" for the 2018–2019 season.

In 2017 Frank Wo/Men Collective was listed in 'Top 10 Thrills (No Frills)' in the Austin Chronicle by Jonelle Seitz.

In 2018 Frank Wo/Men Collective was commissioned by Meow Wolf to create site specific work for SXSW.

In 2020 Frank Wo/Men Collective was selected to be a resident company at Texas Performing Arts to develop new work.

=== Awards and nominations ===
- Best of Austin 2019, Austin Chronicle - Winner
- Austin Critics Table, 2018-2019 Best Ensemble - Nominee
- Top Thrills no Frills 2017, Austin Chronicle - Winner
- Austin Critics Table, 2017-2018 Best Ensemble - Nominee

=== New work created by Frank Wo/Men Collective ===
- Loose Gravel, Jan. 2017
- Tiskettasket, July 2017
- Rick Said So, Oct 2018
- Rub A Duck, June 2019
