= Convergence Station =

Immersive art exhibition in Denver, Colorado

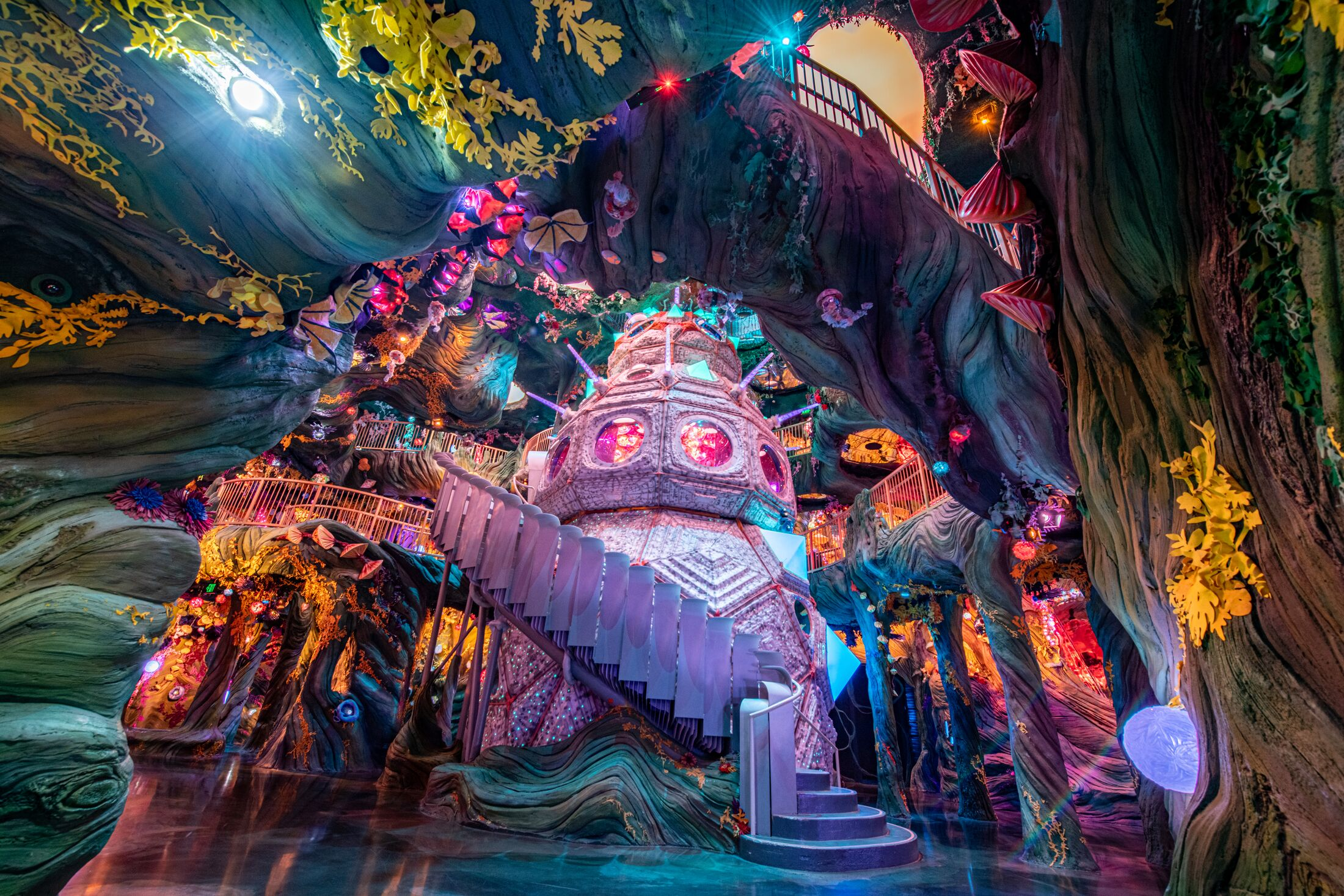
- Inside Meow Wolf Denver's Convergence Station
- Interactive map of Convergence Station

General information
- Type: Immersive art exhibition
- Location: Denver, Colorado, United States, 1338 1st Street, Denver, CO 80204
- Coordinates: 39°44′27″N 105°0′57″W
- Opened: September 17, 2021
- Owner: Meow Wolf

Technical details
- Size: 90,000 square feet

Website
- meowwolf.com/visit/denver

Convergence Station is an immersive art exhibition in Denver, Colorado, created and operated by Meow Wolf. It opened to the public on September 17, 2021, as the company’s third permanent exhibition. Housed in a four-story, 90,000 sq ft (8,400 m^{2}) facility at 1338 1st Street, the installation presents a narrative setting that links four distinct fictional “worlds.”

== History and development ==
Meow Wolf announced plans for a Denver exhibition in 2018; the project opened in September 2021 following several years of construction. Arts coverage reported a budget in the range of $60 million.

== Design and narrative ==
The exhibition is organized as a transit hub operated by the in-universe Quantum Department of Transportation (QDOT), through which visitors access four interconnected environments: C Street, Eemia, Numina, and the Ossuary. Reporting described a large-scale, multi-floor installation with numerous interactive rooms and story elements, developed with contributions from hundreds of artists, including more than 100 based in Colorado. By purchasing an RFID card known as a QPASS, guests can participate in an interactive story tasking them with solving a missing persons case related to four women connected to the convergence event that connected the worlds together.

== Location and architecture ==
Convergence Station occupies a custom-built structure on a triangular lot near the I-25 and Colfax viaducts in central Denver. The building contains approximately 90,000 sq ft (8,400 m^{2}) of space over four levels.

== Programming and facilities ==
In addition to regular timed admission, the site includes a live-performance venue called the Perplexiplex, which hosts concerts and special events, and a cocktail lounge known as Sips (With a Z).

== Reception ==
Coverage at opening characterized Convergence Station as a large-scale, multiworld immersive environment. The Washington Post described the Denver installation as a “90,000-square-foot menagerie of intergalactic, interactive art pieces.” Artnet News noted the custom-built facility and four-floor layout, and highlighted the inclusion of Colorado artists. The local cultural press has also covered ongoing programming and venue features.

== See also ==
- Meow Wolf
- House of Eternal Return
- Omega Mart
- The Real Unreal
- Radio Tave
