= Matt King (artist) =

American artist (1984–2022)

- Born: Matthew Warren King; September 6, 1984; Arlington, Texas, U.S.
- Died: July 9, 2022 (aged 37); Santa Fe, New Mexico, U.S.
- Known for: Immersive art installations
- Notable work: House of Eternal Return, Omega Mart, Meow Wolf

Matthew Warren King (September 6, 1984 – July 9, 2022) was an American artist and co-founder of Meow Wolf, where he worked as senior vice president of creative direction until his death in July 2022. A native of Arlington, Texas, King was based in Santa Fe, New Mexico.

== Early life ==
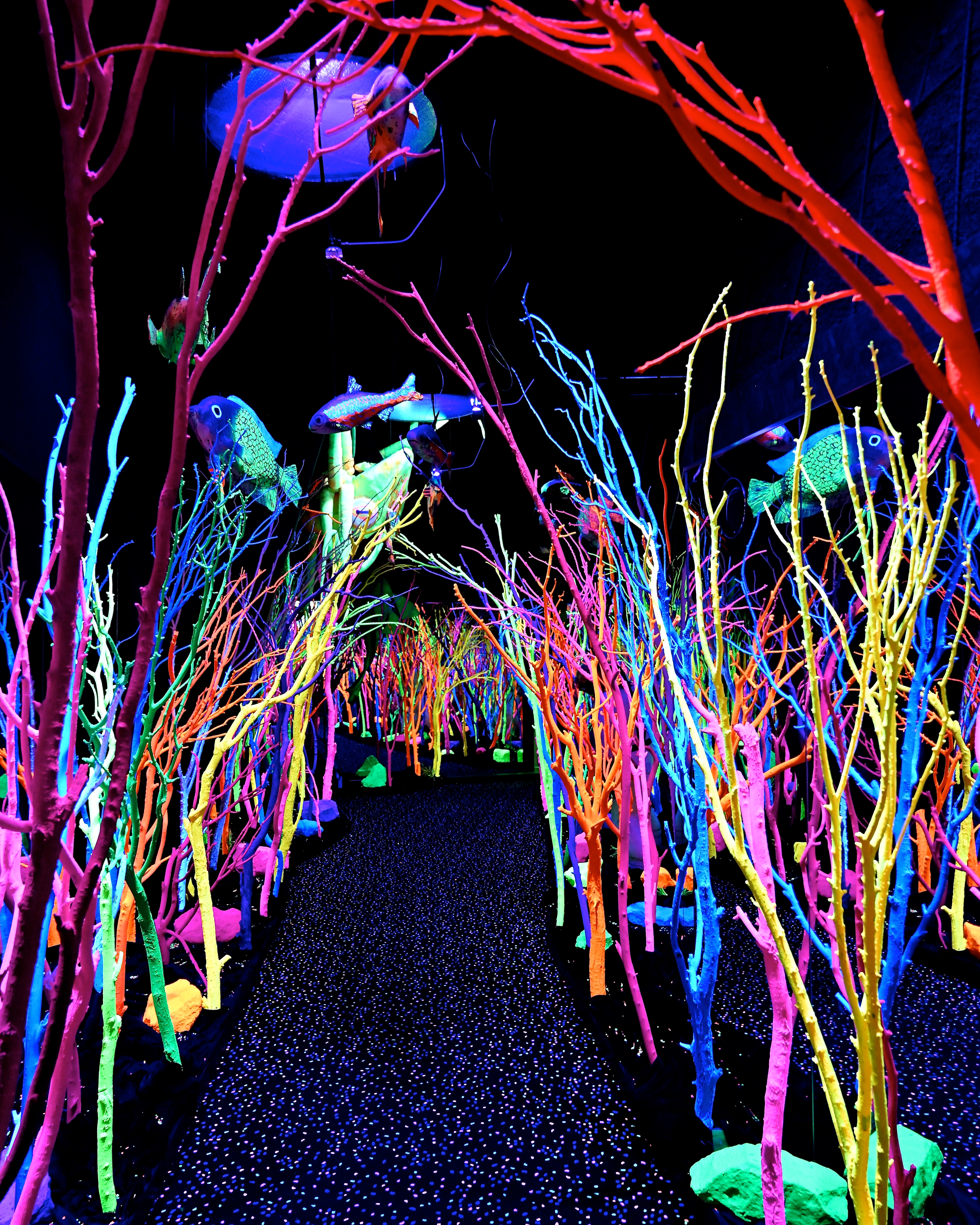
"Glowquarium" at Meow Wolf, House of Eternal Return

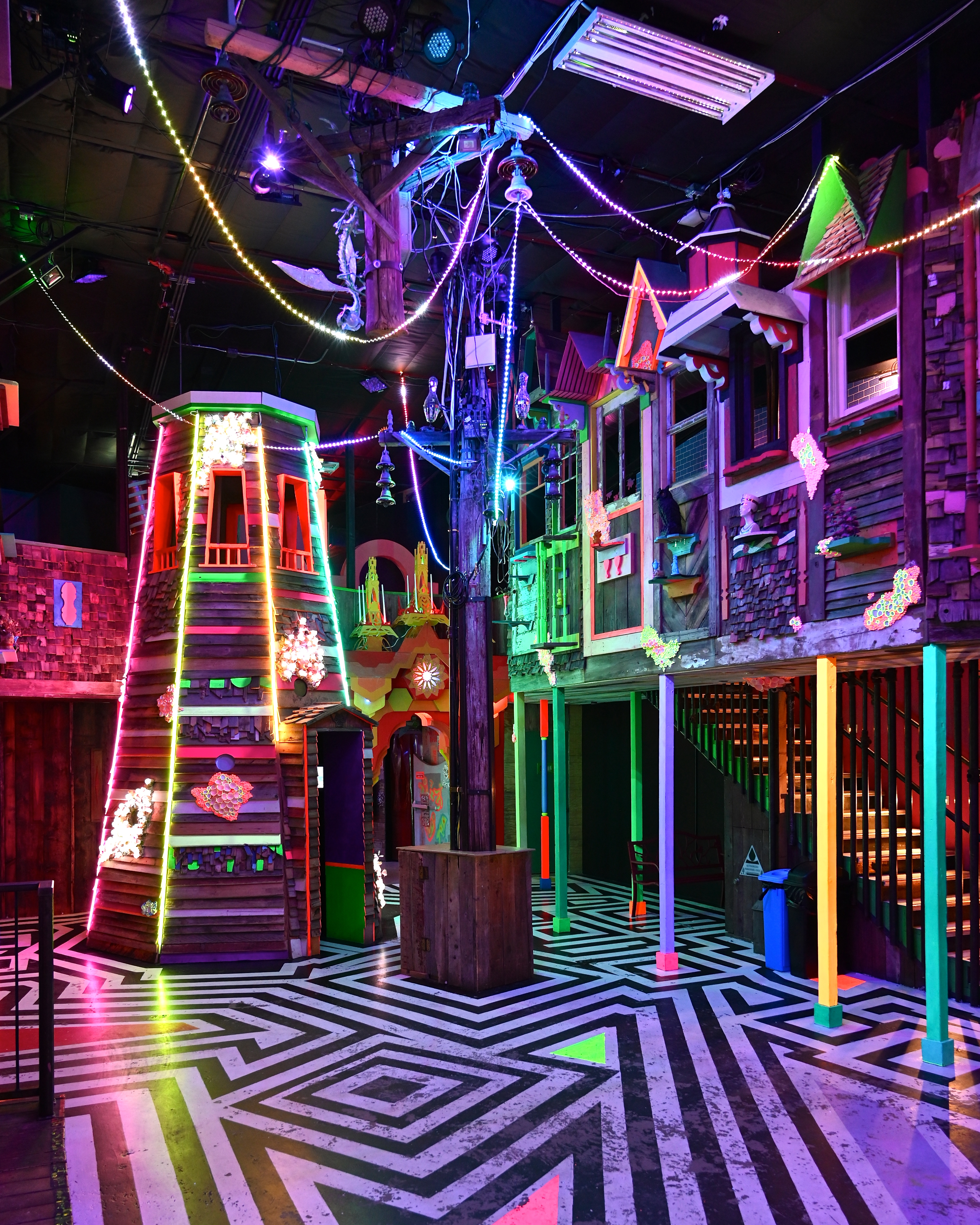
Detail of Fancy Town at Meow Wolf, House of Eternal Return

King was born on 6 September 1984, to Mitzi King and Randy King, and was raised in Arlington, Texas. King attended high school and junior college before deciding that college was not right for him. Before co-founding Meow Wolf, he worked as an art handler, landscaper and food delivery person.

== Career ==
King began his career as a painter, and when living in Texas he taught outdoor education to grade-school children in Dallas-Fort Worth, and had plans to open a summer camp. In addition to his work as a visual artist, King was also a multi-instrumentalist musician. He moved to Santa Fe in 2007. In 2008, he created his first immersive artwork, Meowzors, with other artists in the collective.

King has been described as a "self-educated philosopher who studies hermeticism and wanted to bring people together with his art."

King was part of the collaborative team of artists that launched Meow Wolf in 2008. He developed or co-developed 34 Meow Wolf projects including House of Eternal Return in Santa Fe and Omega Mart in Las Vegas, as well as being the lead artist on The Cathedral at Meow Wolf Denver. He was a lead artist on many interactive artworks including the Glowquarium installation and the Fancy Town at the House of Eternal Return. The Fancy Town installation doubles as an event venue, and has the appearance of an Old West ghost town made of recycled scrap wood and construction waste. King described it as “Turning your capitalistic trash into freedom of expression.” King constructed the surrounding walls to have the appearance of old storefronts.

== Meow Wolf ==
King participated in the first meeting of the Meow Wolf art collective in 2008. During the early years, King and his collaborators created surreal and futuristic immersive art environments, and hosted music shows and events. In 2015, George R. R. Martin pledged $2.7 million dollars for a long-term lease and renovation of a vacant bowling alley in Santa Fe for the collective to develop a permanent interactive museum. By 2022, the company had grown to 980 employees, with a revenue of $158 million, and had served more than 1.5 million visitors. King was involved with over 34 Meow Wolf projects, many as the lead artist. Meow Wolf had announced, in May 2022, two new permanent interactive exhibition spaces in Houston and Grapevine.

== Death ==
Matt King died by suicide in Santa Fe on July 9, 2022, at age 37. He was survived by his fiancée, Meow Wolf colleague Han Santana-Sayles, his mother, and a brother.
