= Brian Andrew Whiteley =

American artist

Brian Andrew Whiteley is an American visual artist from New York City and founder of Satellite Art Show.

== Works ==
=== Lawsuit by Justin Bieber ===
In 2021, Whiteley was sued by Justin Bieber for impersonating him. Whiteley had been channelling Bieber as a performance art project. He created a body of paintings as Bieber and had a gallery show planned in New York City when Bieber's Los Angeles legal firm sued. Collectors wishing to buy "Bieber paintings" had to sign a non-disclosure agreement to see the catalog, and there were multiple offers for works starting at $100,000. Whiteley eventually revealed he was performing as Bieber and had to change the name of the show from "Paintings from Space by Justin Bieber" to "Just Bieber is Suing Me by Brian Andrew Whiteley". One of the works was actually made by Whitely's five-year-old son.

=== Bigfoot performances ===
From 2012-2014, Whiteley repeatedly videotaped himself in the woods as Bigfoot and submitted the documentation to experts as first-hand sightings of Bigfoot via the website BFRO.NET He was able to speak directly with the experts about his experience of capturing Bigfoot. Whiteley used these interactions to inform his performances. His most refined performance went viral. Whiteley stopped videotaping himself as Bigfoot after being shot at by a hunter while in his Bigfoot costume in Upstate New York.

=== Creepy Clown pandemic ===
In 2013, Whiteley began performing as a clown at Green-Wood Cemetery in Brooklyn. He documented the performances and sent in video and photos from fake gmail accounts to the media. The clown was picked up by numerous press outlets including the NY Daily News, New York Magazine, Gothamist and the Village Voice. In the middle of the NYC clown frenzy, Whiteley flew to Chicago and performed as a clown in Rosewood Cemetery, which quickly got picked up by CBS, Fox and Huffington Post which cemented the creepy clown pandemic in people's mind. Copy-cat clowns soon started popping up around the country. During this project, Whiteley explored how the media substantiates works of art and how far could he can push them on coverage. The project was based on fake news before the term was popularized.

=== Trump Tombstone ===
In 2016, Whiteley created a Trump Tombstone, a 500-pound gravestone dedicated to Republican Party presidential candidate Donald Trump. It was originally unveiled in the early hours of Easter Sunday in Central Park, New York City. The stone read "Made America Hate Again" and listed "Trump, Donald J" in sharp letters. Although it was removed within hours, images of the work circulated on social media and the police searched for the artist, who remained unidentified nearly two months, although he gave anonymous interviews where he said the work was "political satire and a guerrilla art piece."

After an investigation by the US Secret Service and the New York City Police Department, Whiteley was revealed as the creator of the tombstone. The Secret Service and NYPD interrogated Whiteley in his home, asking him if he owned a gun, if he attended presidential rallies, and about the books he read. Whiteley was never charged and was eventually allowed to pick up the tombstone from the NYPD evidence locker.

=== Vladimir Putin presidential portrait ===
In 2018, at the height of the Russiagate investigations, Whiteley hung a portrait of Russian President Vladimir Putin sitting in front of the White House in Donald Trump's Trump International Hotel in Washington, D.C.. The portrait hung in the hotel's Presidential Suite for over a month. Numerous VIP guests had frequented the suite. When Whiteley returned to retrieve the artwork he was escorted from the building by the Hotel security.

== Satellite Art Show ==
Whiteley is the founder of the Satellite Art Show, an artist-run fair held annually in Miami, New York City and occasionally in Austin, Texas. Satellite was voted Miami's best art fair by popular vote via Miami New Times. Satellite was given the key to the city of Miami Beach and has received a Mayoral proclamation naming December 5th as Satellite Art Show Day. Notable past exhibitors include Meow Wolf, Jacolby Satterwhite, DiMODA, Rashaad Newsome, Jen Catron and Paul Outlaw and the estate of Frida Kahlo. Notable past performers included Ghostface Killah, Denzel Curry, Cupcakke, Misterperiod, Show Me the Body, Vic Mensa, Lee Ranaldo and James Chance. Notable and attendees have included Leonardo DiCaprio, Mike D, Usher and Natalie Imbruglia.

In 2024, the Satellite Art Show opened an art gallery in the Lower East Side of Manhattan.
