= Ryan Doherty (businessman) =

American nightlife entrepreneur

- Born: Boston, Massachusetts, U.S.
- Education: University of Nevada, Las Vegas
- Occupation: Nightlife entrepreneur
- Known for: Founder of Corner Bar Management

Ryan Doherty is an American nightlife entrepreneur based in Las Vegas, Nevada. He is the founder of Corner Bar Management, which operates bars, restaurants and nightclubs in the Fremont East district of Downtown Las Vegas and in the city's Arts District. From 2015 to 2019 he was a co-owner and chief experience officer of the Life Is Beautiful Music & Art Festival.

== Early life and education ==
Doherty grew up in Boston. He enrolled in the hotel program at the University of Massachusetts Amherst and first came to Las Vegas as an exchange student at age 19. He later transferred to the University of Nevada, Las Vegas, and graduated in 1999.

== Career ==
=== Early career and publishing ===
While in college, Doherty gained early experience in hospitality at the Hard Rock Hotel. He later worked as a waiter at Mortoni's, produced a house music night at the Red Dragon Lounge and became general manager of Baby's, a nightclub at the Hard Rock.

With business partner Justin Weniger, Doherty co-founded Wendoh Media, which published the magazines Vegas Seven and Vegas/Rated. Through the company's printing business, Doherty began working with Tony Hsieh, the Zappos chief executive who later invested heavily in downtown Las Vegas.

=== Life Is Beautiful ===
After Wendoh Media was sold to Hsieh, Doherty acquired a 50 percent stake in the Life Is Beautiful festival and served as its chief experience officer from 2015 to 2019. In that role he coordinated public art installations in downtown Las Vegas, including murals and sculptures by about 50 artists. He sold his interest in the festival in 2019 to focus on his bar business.

=== Corner Bar Management ===
Doherty opened his first bar, Commonwealth, on Fremont Street in 2012. Commonwealth houses The Laundry Room, a 22-seat speakeasy located in space that once served as the laundry room for guests of the nearby El Cortez hotel. The company later added Park on Fremont, a restaurant and bar with a garden patio.

In July 2020, during the COVID-19 pandemic, Corner Bar Management opened Lucky Day, a mezcal and tequila bar, and DISCOPUSSY, an after-hours nightclub focused on house and techno music. The company opened two other venues that year, Oddwood at AREA15 and Museum Fiasco. DISCOPUSSY is known for a large illuminated octopus sculpture suspended over its dance floor.

In April 2022 the company opened Cheapshot, a combination bar and showroom, and We All Scream, a nightclub with an attached not-for-profit ice creamery whose proceeds benefit public art. That year it also opened the restaurant Peyote. In 2023 Forbes reported that the company operated 10 venues in the Fremont Street area.

As of 2026, Corner Bar Management's portfolio consists of Commonwealth, The Laundry Room, Park on Fremont, Lucky Day, DISCOPUSSY, Cheapshot and We All Scream in the Fremont East Entertainment District, along with Doberman Drawing Room in the Arts District.

In 2025 Corner Bar Management joined the Downtown Vegas Alliance, a business group representing downtown property owners and operators.

In May 2026 the company completed a redesign of Commonwealth and The Laundry Room, the first full renovation since Commonwealth opened. According to the Las Vegas Review-Journal, Doherty sourced or salvaged the furnishings himself. The renovation added a Thursday rooftop residency called Birds of a Feather, and The Laundry Room reopened with Davey Francis as head mixologist and a new cocktail menu.

=== Doberman Drawing Room ===
In 2024 Doherty announced plans for Doberman, a cocktail bar in the Las Vegas Arts District that would offer optional paid memberships while remaining open to the public. He named the bar after a phrase his father used to describe a family friend's Doberman pinscher when Doherty was a child. Doberman Drawing Room opened to the public on April 30, 2025. Its cocktail program is led by Juyoung Kang, who was the opening bartender at The Laundry Room.

=== Feed the Block ===
In April 2025 Corner Bar Management and Wynn Nightlife launched Feed the Block, a free outdoor concert series held at the intersection of Fremont Street and Sixth Street. The first event featured DJ Gryffin. Later editions in 2025 featured Major Lazer in September and Diplo in October. Doherty told Las Vegas Weekly that the series was inspired by the street atmosphere of Life Is Beautiful. The organizers reported that the 2025 series drew more than 40,000 attendees. Marshmello headlined the series' first-anniversary event on April 2, 2026.
