= The Real Unreal =

Immersive art exhibition in Grapevine, Texas

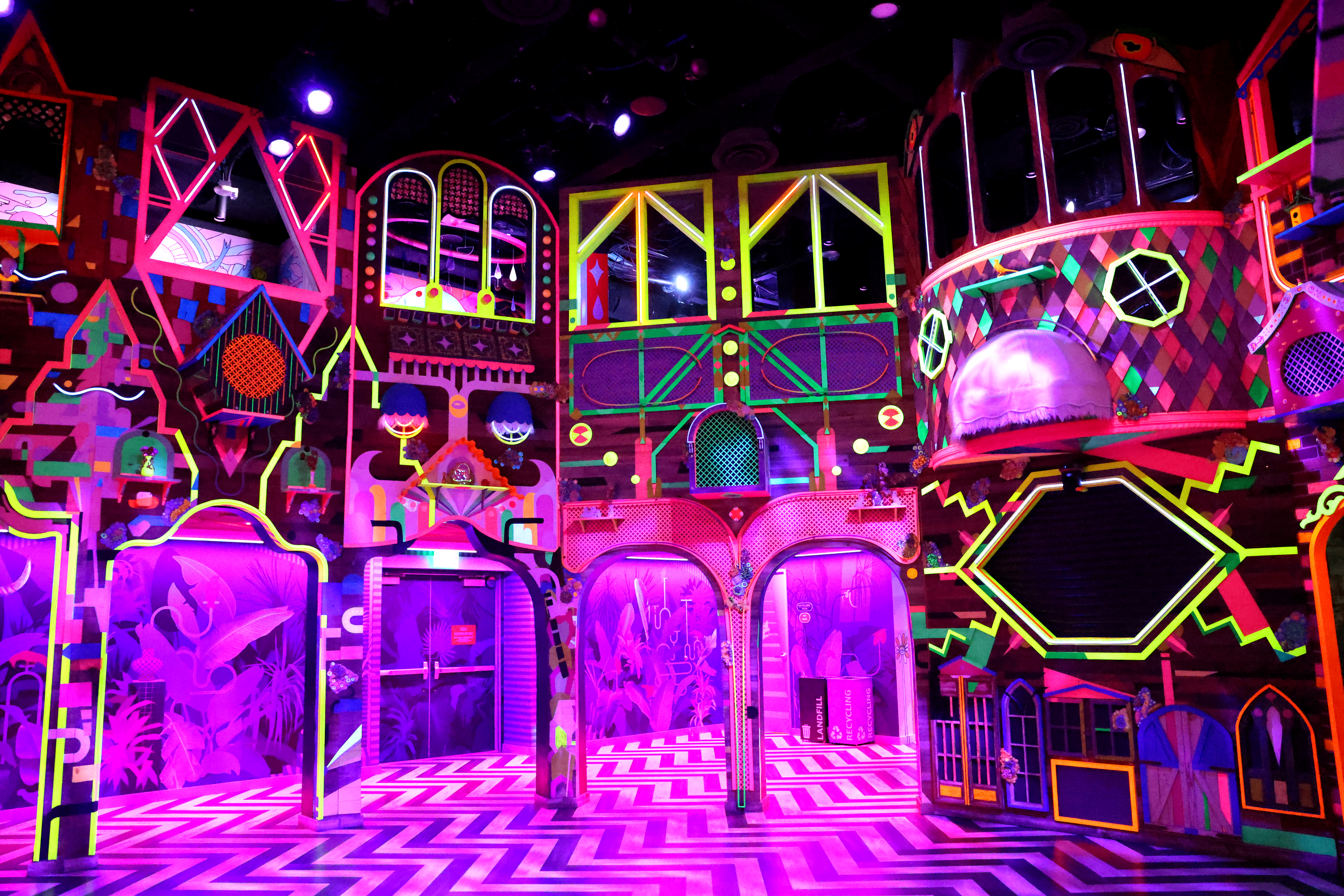
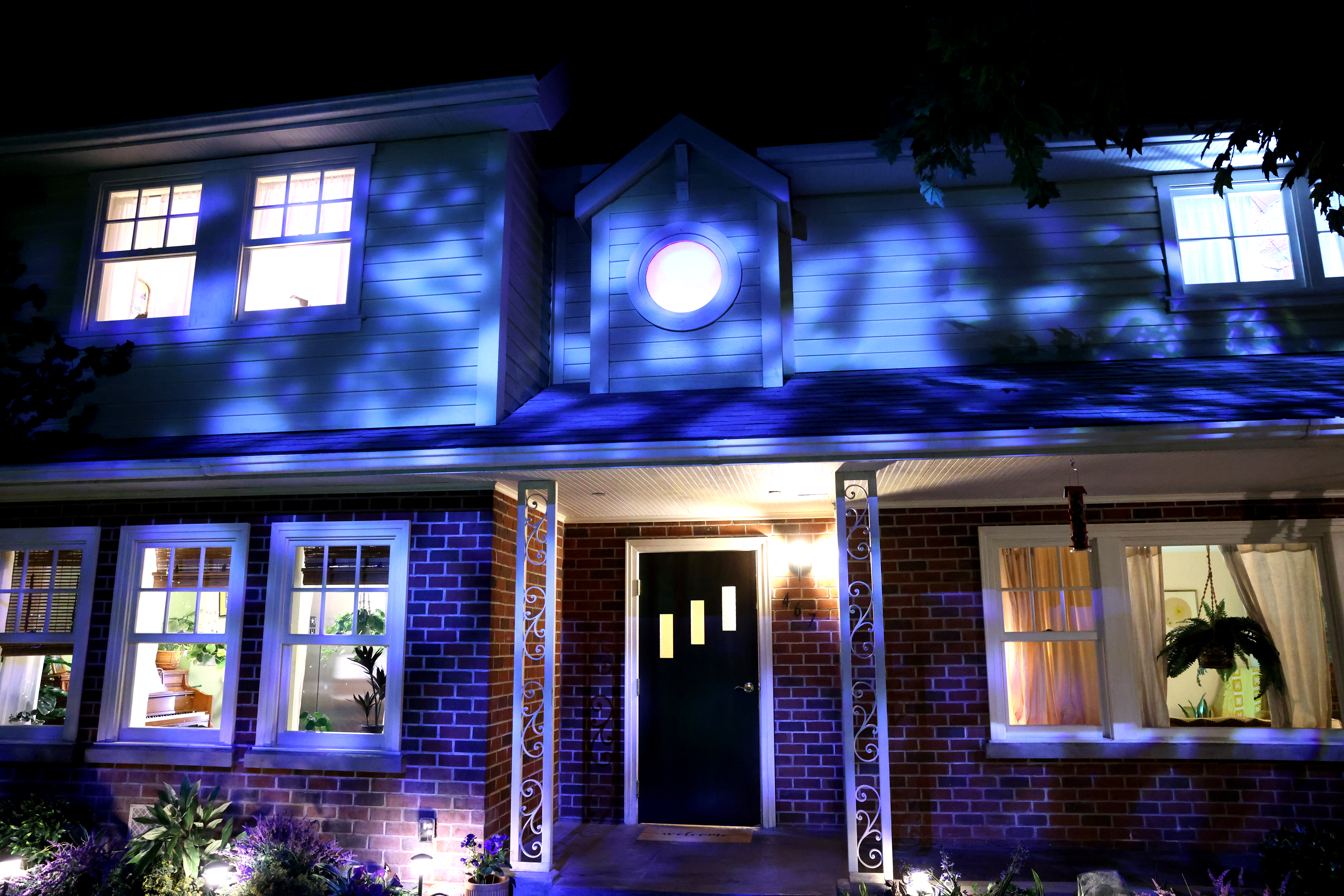
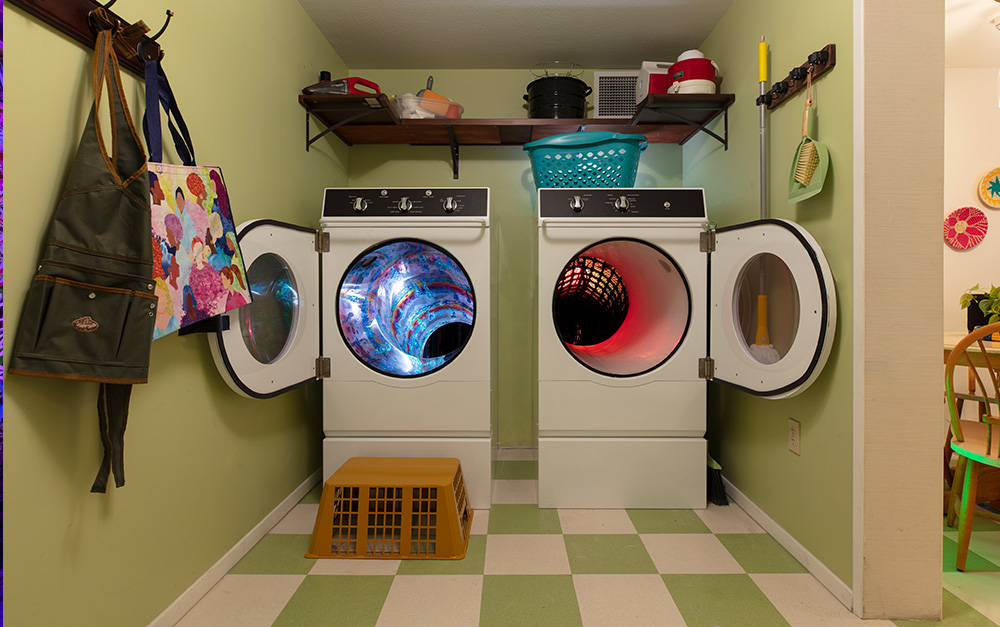
- Neon Kingdom The Delaney House Laundry Room Inside Meow Wolf Grapevine's The Real Unreal

General information
- Type: Immersive art exhibition
- Location: Grapevine, Texas, United States, 3000 Grapevine Mills Pkwy, Suite 253, Grapevine, TX 76051
- Opened: July 14, 2023
- Owner: Meow Wolf

Technical details
- Size: 29,000 square feet

Website
- meowwolf.com/visit/grapevine

The Real Unreal is an immersive art exhibition in Grapevine, Texas, created and operated by Meow Wolf. Opened on July 14, 2023, it is the company’s fourth permanent exhibition and its first in Texas. The installation occupies roughly 29,000 square feet (2,700 m^{2}) inside the Grapevine Mills shopping mall and features contributions from dozens of artists, including Texas-based collaborators.

== Background ==
Meow Wolf announced plans for a North Texas exhibition at Grapevine Mills in 2022. By early 2023, the company stated that the Grapevine installation would span about 29,000 square feet and include approximately 30 rooms, developed with a large cohort of Texas artists working alongside Meow Wolf’s in-house team.

== Design and narrative ==
The Real Unreal is set within the home of a fictional, multigenerational family. Visitors encounter portals from domestic spaces into fantastical environments, with a narrative centered on the disappearance of a child, Jared Fuqua, and the efforts of his family and community to find him. The storyline was developed by writer LaShawn M. Wanak. Press previews described more than 30 interlinked rooms and hallways, including recurring motifs such as a refrigerator “portal.”

== Location and facilities ==
The exhibition occupies a former big-box retail space inside Grapevine Mills. In June 2025, Meow Wolf added Prime Materia, a bar integrated into the narrative environment, offering both alcoholic and non-alcoholic beverages and light snacks.

== Reception ==
Regional arts coverage noted the exhibition’s scale, the number of Texas-based contributors, and the narrative framing that connects rooms into a larger story world. Reviews and features highlighted elements such as interactive props, puzzle-like clues, and cross-references to prior Meow Wolf installations.

== See also ==
- Meow Wolf
- House of Eternal Return
- Omega Mart
- Radio Tave
- Convergence Station
