= Area15 =

Retail and entertainment complex in Las Vegas, US

Coordinates: 36.132175°N 115.180782°W

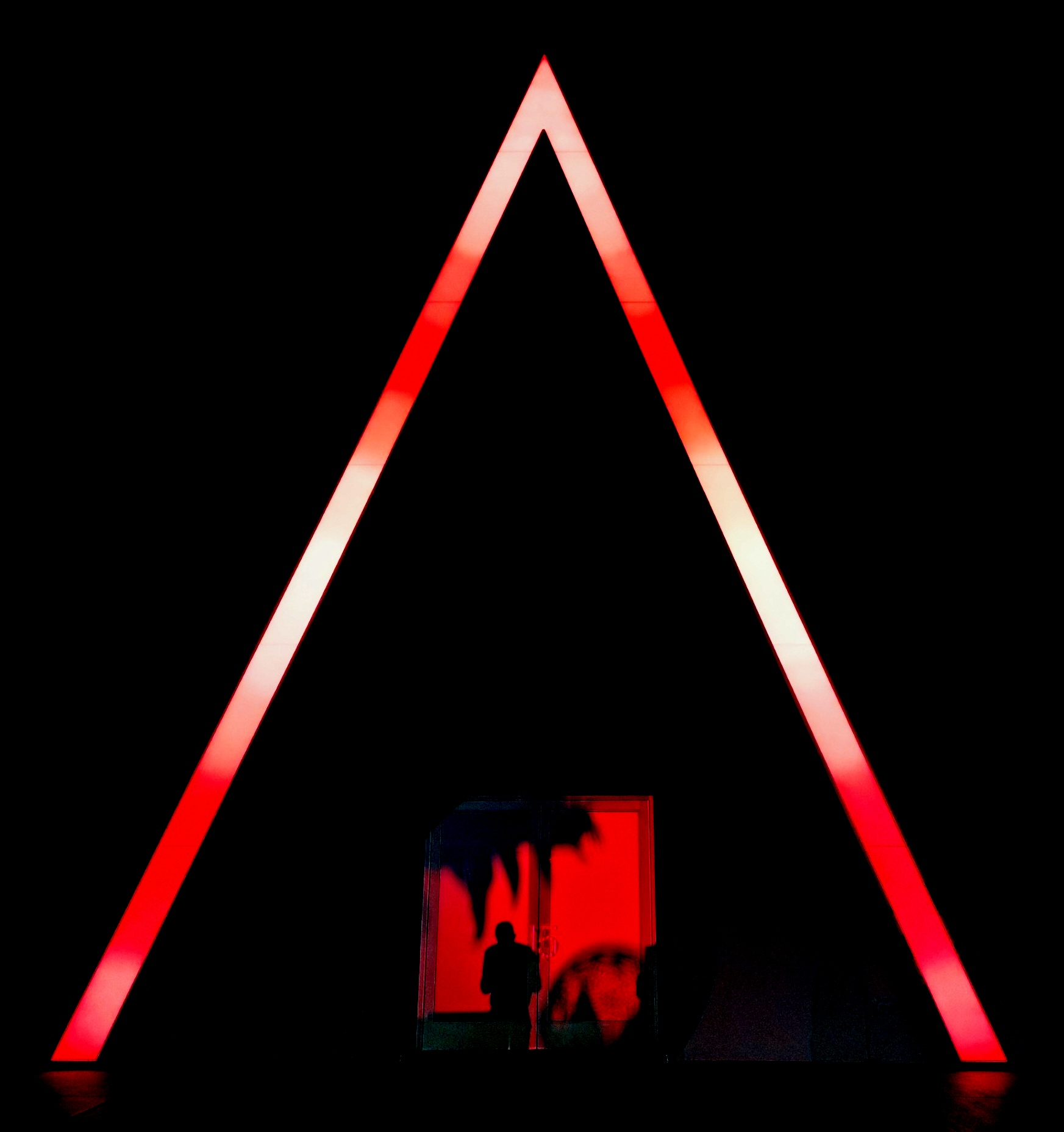
Entrance to AREA15

AREA15 is an experiential retail and entertainment complex located in Las Vegas, Nevada, one mile west of the Las Vegas Strip. It houses several major experiential entertainment residencies and includes sculptures and other art displays, as well as alcohol outlets and a restaurant.

AREA15 is a joint project between Fisher Brothers and Beneville Studios. Plans for the project date to 2016, and the opening was initially scheduled for December 2019. However, new ideas for the project pushed back its opening. Portions of the facility were eventually opened on September 17, 2020. Omega Mart is the primary attraction at Area15. It is an interactive art installation operated by experiential art collective Meow Wolf. Another major tenant was Lost Spirits, a distillery which operated from 2021 to 2024.

== History ==
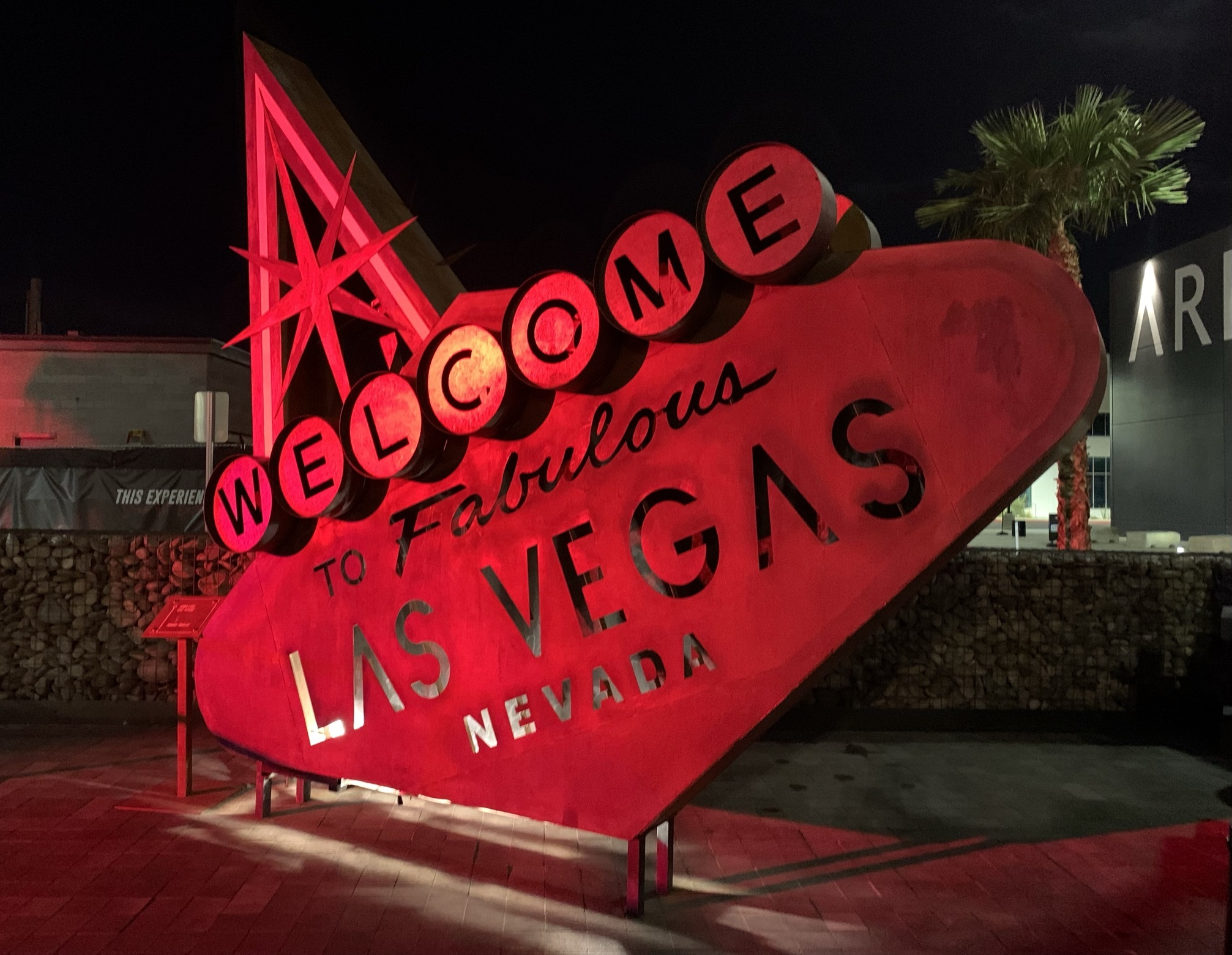
Sign outside AREA15

AREA15 is located one mile west of the Las Vegas Strip, beside Interstate 15. The land was previously occupied by a Mercedes-Benz dealership. Fisher Brothers purchased the site and nearby acreage in 2005, with plans for a mixed-use project on the parcels. These plans were derailed due to the 2008 financial crisis, and the project was never built. In 2016, planning began to develop AREA15 on the site of the former dealership. It is a joint project between Fisher Brothers and Beneville Studios. Winston Fisher and Michael Beneville determined that an original concept was needed for their project to adequately compete with the Strip. They eventually decided on an entertainment and retail complex with a science-fiction theme. Meow Wolf had originally planned to open a project in downtown Las Vegas with the assistance of Tony Hsieh. This plan did not work out, but Meow Wolf still decided to proceed with a project in the city, eventually teaming up with AREA15. Winston Fisher described AREA15 as an event center inspired by shopping malls and theme parks. The project's slogan is, "AREA15 does not exist." Fisher said, "I had a desire to make something original, something different. I wanted to make something that doesn't exist." He further said, "This couldn't have existed in 2005 anyway. Meow Wolf didn't exist. A lot of the technology we're using didn't exist." The project's name is a reference to Area 51, but it also refers to Fisher Brothers' founding in 1915 and the adjacent Interstate 15. The name was originally meant only as a working title.

AREA15 was originally set to open in December 2019, with Meow Wolf as its anchor tenant. Nomadic, a virtual reality company, was announced as the facility's second tenant in May 2019, set to occupy 6,000 sq ft (560 m^{2}). A month later, it was announced that Emporium, a bar and arcade, would occupy another 10,000 sq ft (930 m^{2}). Prospective retail tenants had to offer unique elements to qualify for a space. AREA15's opening date was delayed until January 2020, and was subsequently delayed further, as new ideas and features were implemented. This included an indoor zip line, which required additional steel, necessary to reinforce the ceiling. AREA15 was later scheduled to open for private events in February 2020, followed by a public opening three or four months later.

Portions of AREA15 were eventually opened on September 17, 2020. AREA15 has capacity for approximately 7,000 people, although upon opening, it was limited to 750 to allow for social distancing, due to the COVID-19 pandemic. Reservations were also required in order to control capacity. Meow Wolf's plans were delayed until early 2021, due to the pandemic.

Area15 had attracted 13 million visitors as of 2024. It is popular among young tourists aged 18 to 34.

== Features ==
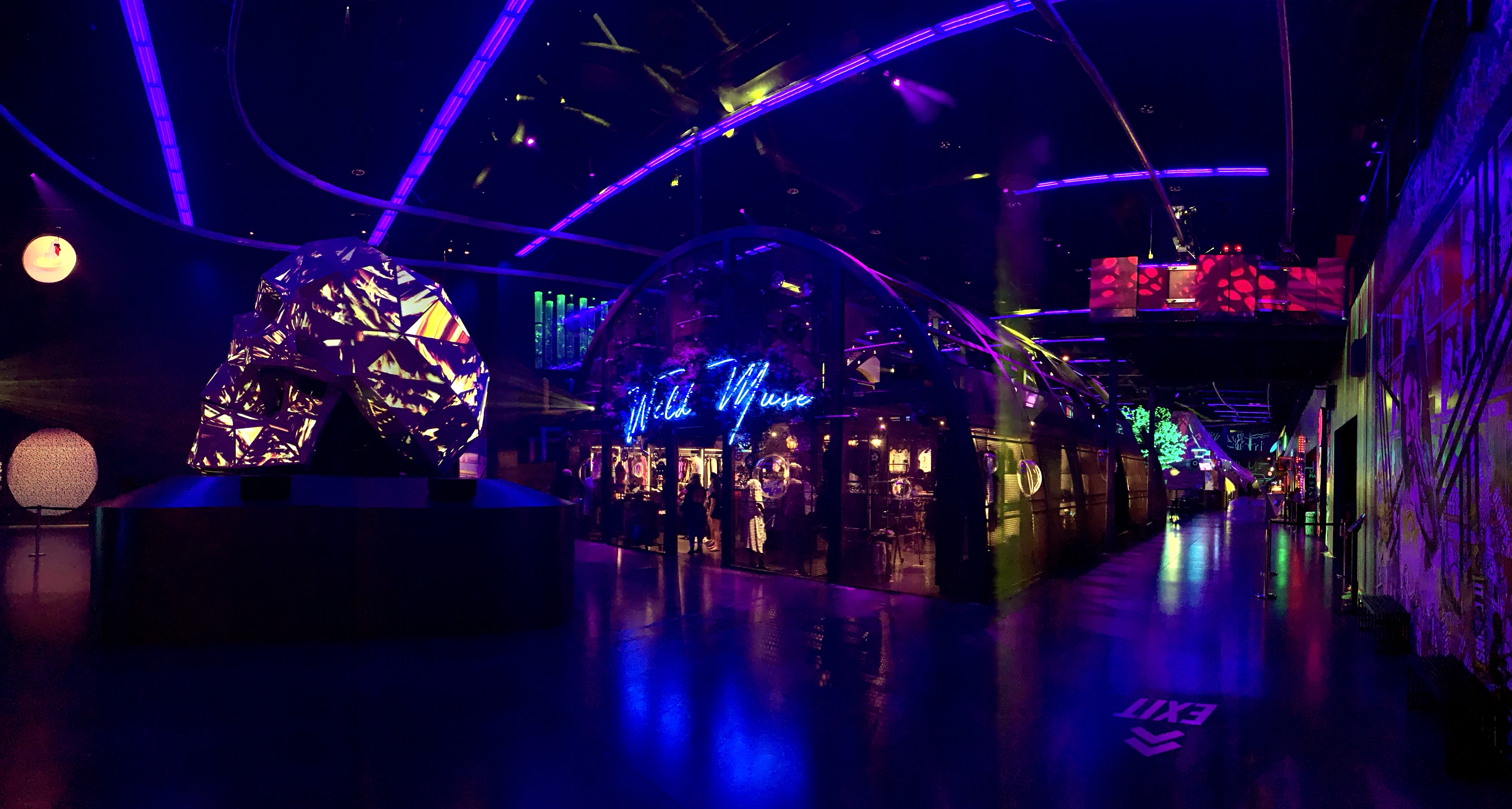
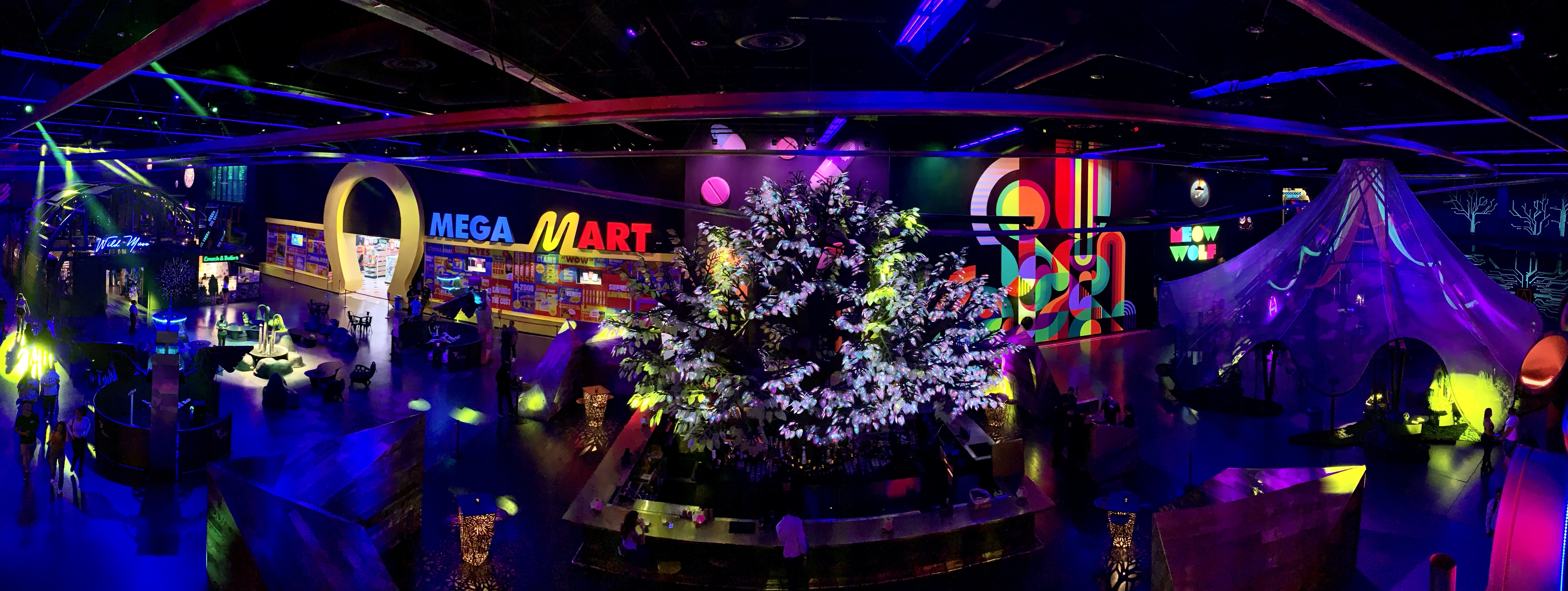
The Spine, which is the main hall, inside Area15

AREA15 has various features, many of which are housed within a large, charcoal-colored building. Describing the building's minimal exterior appearance, Michael Beneville said, "I love Las Vegas—the lights and the glitz. We knew that we couldn't even try to do something that could outdo the casinos." One side of the building's exterior features a giant abstract mural. The building measures 200,000 sq ft (19,000 m^{2}). Art Island, an outdoor art gallery, is located in front of the facility. It includes several sculptures, which come from the annual Burning Man festival and are available for sale. Also located in front of the building is an old airplane, on display in the parking lot.

The interior includes a main hall known as The Spine, which is lit with blacklights and neon colors. The Spine is 80 feet wide, 300 feet long, and 32 feet high. Meow Wolf's project, known as Omega Mart, occupies space on the Spine's west side, while two floors of various tenants are located on the east side. The interior entrance includes a 12-foot-tall, 360-degree projection mapped skull. The Spine also includes Oddwood, an indoor bar with a giant, artificial Japanese maple tree that is made with thousands of LED lights. An indoor lounge and private events space, known as Sanctuary, features a volcano-shaped canopy. The Portal is a large room with four projection mapped walls, capable of simulating various environments. The Portal hosted the 2022 Best of Vegas awards by Las Vegas Weekly.

Another attraction, Birdly, simulates the experience of flying over large cities. Museum Fiasco is a 5,000 sq ft (460 m^{2}) kunsthalle museum with an emphasis on light and sound. Other features include an indoor axe-throwing lounge, an ice cream shop, and the Haley's Comet zip line rollercoaster (Rollglider), which travels through the Spine. In late 2020, AREA15 operated a temporary Christmas attraction known as Wanderland, consisting of an outdoor tree-lined village. A temporary roller-skating rink operated in early 2021.

Chris Wink, a founder of the Blue Man Group, is AREA15's director of content, and the facility includes a 1,500 sq ft (140 m^{2}) mirror room known as Wink World, opened in January 2021. At the end of the month, chef Todd English opened a restaurant at AREA15 known as The Beast. Prior to opening in its permanent location at the facility, The Beast operated as a pop-up restaurant, occupying an outdoor events area. In February 2021, a 6,300 sq ft (590 m^{2}) golf simulator attraction was added, and Emporium opened its arcade and bar.

Meow Wolf's Omega Mart is an interactive walk-through art exhibit that is themed after a grocery store. It measures 52,000 sq ft (4,800 m^{2}) and includes items for purchase. Meow Wolf spent three and a half years planning Omega Mart, and more than 325 artists worked on the project. It opened on February 18, 2021.

In 2021, AREA15 also added a four-acre, outdoor event space known as The Grounds. It was built on the former site of Scandia Family Fun Center, and would be used for concerts and festivals. Later in the year, The Grounds hosted the Daytime Stage for the iHeartRadio Music Festival.

AREA15 also added the Lost Spirits distillery in 2021. It was a distillery housed within a dreamlike cluster of tasting rooms themed around the company's distilled spirits. It was often described by journalists as a "boozy amusement park" or "Willy Wonka for adults." It closed in 2024.

Illuminarium, a multisensory virtual reality attraction, opened in 2022. The Wall, a music and events venue, was added in 2023. At that time, AREA15 included two retailers, while entertainment-focused tenants occupied the remaining spaces.

In February 2024, Lionsgate announced a partnership with Area15 to open the John Wick Experience, an attraction based on the eponymous film series, by the end of the year. Chad Stahelski and his company 87North Productions were involved in the overall design of the experience, which will allow guests to step into the Las Vegas Continental and be tasked with high-stakes missions, as well as visiting a themed bar and retail shop. Old warehouses west of the main building were repurposed for additional Area15 venues, including the John Wick attraction.

=== Vegas Immersive District ===
The Vegas Immersive District, named in 2024, will be a mixed-use 20-acre addition to Area15, located north of the main building. It began construction in 2023, and will include a hotel and residential housing, as well as office, retail and dining space.

It also features Universal Horror Unleashed, a year-round Halloween attraction by Universal Destinations & Experiences, which opened on August 14, 2025.

== Other locations ==
From late 2022 to early 2023, Area15 operated a pop-up location in Saudi Arabia, and later began discussions with partners about opening a permanent facility there.

In addition to Las Vegas, a second permanent location was announced for Orlando, Florida in 2022, but never began construction. It was canceled in 2024, the year it was scheduled to open. Discussions continued about expanding Area15 to other U.S. and international locations.
