= John Whiteley =

John Whiteley may refer to:

- John Whiteley (missionary) (1806–1869), English Methodist missionary to New Zealand
- John Whiteley (politician) (1898–1943), British Conservative Party politician, MP for Buckingham 1937–43
- John Peter Whiteley (born 1955), British cricketer
- John Scott Whiteley (born 1950), English organist
- John Whiteley (British Army officer) (1896–1970), British Army general

== See also ==
- Jon Whiteley (1945–2020), British art historian and child actor
- Johnny Whiteley (born 1930), English rugby league player and coach
