= Peter Whiteley =

Peter Whiteley may refer to

- Peter Whiteley (Royal Marines officer) (1920–2016), UK military officer, Lieutenant Governor of Jersey
- Peter Whiteley (cricketer, born 1935) (1935–1989), English cricketer
- Peter Whiteley (cricketer, born 1955) (born 1955), English cricketer
- Peter Whiteley Jr., fictitious character in UK series Emmerdale
