= Huntington-Whiteley =

Huntington-Whiteley is a surname. Notable people with the surname include:

- Herbert Huntington-Whiteley (1857–1936), British Conservative politician
- Rosie Huntington-Whiteley (born 1987), British model, actress, fashion designer, and businesswoman

== See also ==
- Huntington-Whiteley baronets
- Huntington (name)
- Whiteley (surname)
