= Jen Catron and Paul Outlaw =

American artist team

Jen Catron
- Born: 1984 (age 41–42); Bluford, Illinois, U.S.
- Known for: Installation art, Sculpture

Paul Outlaw
- Born: 1980 (age 45–46); Fairhope, Alabama, U.S.
- Known for: Installation art, Sculpture, Performance art

Jen Catron (born 1984) and Paul Outlaw (born 1980) are a team of American sculptural installation artists known for their collaborative works. Catron and Outlaw create large-scale sculptures, kinetic installations, and immersive environments that often comment on American culture and consumerism.

== Early lives and education ==
Catron was born in Bluford, Illinois. Outlaw was born and raised in Fairhope, Alabama, where he attended Fairhope High School. After high school, Outlaw pursued art at the University of South Alabama, where he earned his bachelor's degree.

Both Catron and Outlaw received their M.F.A. degrees from the Cranbrook Academy of Art, where the two met. Subsequently they were married and became collaborators. After graduation, they relocated to Brooklyn, New York, where they continue to live and work.

== Career ==
Catron and Outlaw's work often employs humor, camp, and spectacle as a means of cultural and political commentary on American culture. Their practice encompasses object-making, performance, painting, video, and animatronics.

In 2016, Catron and Outlaw debuted two works Behold! I Teach You the Overman!, a live performance and interactive installation, and "F*ck Off," a large-scale installation featuring a 10-foot-tall milk fountain, at the Satellite Art Fair in Miami. The piece, in which performers swim in a pool of milk, exemplifies their approach to creating immersive, provocative experiences.

In 2019, Catron and Outlaw's installed Sin(k) and B.S.O. (Bright Shiny Object) at the Brooklyn Museum. The exhibition featured two oversized sculptures: a bathroom sink and an ice cream sundae, both transformed into self-circulating fountains. Tessa Solomon of ARTnews called the works "humorous, sure, but tragic", saying the works "smack of consumer excess and wanton celebration."

Catron and Outlaw's work has been exhibited at institutions including the Brooklyn Museum, Museum of Contemporary Art Detroit, Cranbrook Art Museum, and Postmasters Gallery.

=== Hot Dog in the City ===
Hot Dog in The City (2024), is a 65-foot-long hot dog sculpture installed in Times Square, New York City. This installation, their largest to date, continues their exploration of American iconography and consumer culture. Hot Dog in The City was a temporary public art installation created by Catron and Outlaw. The installation, was installed on April 30, 2024, in Times Square, New York City, features a 65-foot-long sculpture of a hot dog with mustard in a bun. According to Times Square Arts, it is the largest work ever commissioned for Times Square and according to the artists it may be the world's largest hot dog sculpture. The daily confetti explosion is meant to reference the showmanship often associated with American culture and patriotism. According to the artists, Hot Dog in The City is designed to examine consumption, capitalism, class and contemporary culture.

Art critics have offered varied interpretations of Hot Dog in The City. The New York Times called the sculpture "an emblem of the hard-to-digest truth about mass production and labor, consumerism and marketing." Rhea Nayyar of Hyperallergic described how the hot dog "complete with puckered ends and a ribbon of mustard, not only enhances the entropy of Times Square, but also dominates the palate." Tessa Solomon of ARTnews wrote that their artwork "feeds and critiques the worst of the American Dream, its insatiable hunger, belligerent confidence, and capitalist impulses". Benjamin Sutton of The Art Newspaper called the installation a "tongue-in-cheek tribute to and critique of all that the hot dog has come to symbolise".
