= Nomadic (company) =

Virtual reality entertainment company

- Logo
- Headquarters: San Rafael, California, United States
- Key people: Doug Griffin (CEO); Rick Schulze (Creative director)
- Number of employees: 6 (2017)
- Website: blurtheline.com

Nomadic (sometimes referred to as Nomadic VR or NomadicVR), is a location-based virtual reality entertainment company based in San Rafael, California, in the United States.

== Overview ==
Nomadic is a virtual reality (VR) entertainment company based in San Rafael, California. Nomadic partners with film and gaming companies to create virtual reality "arcades", or various commercial brick and mortar locations such as malls and theaters, where participants' tactile and virtual realities are merged. Users wear headsets and computer backpacks to explore virtual environments, and often use physical props as part of the VR narrative. Venues host modular sets that can be easily adapted to accommodate regularly-updated VR content.

The company's founders have backgrounds in the brand, film, gaming, and retail industries. Doug Griffin is chief executive officer, and Rick Schulze is creative director. John Duncan is head of physical production, and Kalon Gutierrez is head of growth.

== History ==
Nomadic's initial $1 million in funding was provided by "family and friends". The company had six full-time employees, as of 2017.

The company unveiled its prototype at the CinemaCon trade show, which is presented by the National Association of Theatre Owners, in Las Vegas in March 2017. In June 2017, Nomadic received $6 million in seed funding from Horizons Ventures, Maveron, Presence Capital, Verus International, and Vulcan Capital, which was used to hire staff, develop technology, and enter new markets and venues. The company's experience was made available to the general public in the Wonderful Worlds of Whampoa mall in Hong Kong in mid 2017. The Technicolor Experience Center, in Culver City, California, hosted a temporary installation in October. Nomadic plans to launch public location-based VR experiences by early 2018.
