= Helen Riaboff Whiteley =

American microbiologist

- Born: 1921; Harbin, China
- Died: 1990 (aged 68–69)
- Education: University of California, Berkeley, University of Texas, Galveston, University of Washington
- Spouse: Arthur Whiteley
- Scientific career
- Fields: Microbiology
- Workplaces: University of Washington

Helen Riaboff Whiteley (1921–1990) was a microbiologist who spent most of her research career at the University of Washington.

== Early life and education ==
Whiteley was born in 1921 to Russian parents in Harbin, China. The family immigrated to the United States in 1924, first settling in Washington and later moving to California. Whiteley studied microbiology at the University of California, Berkeley, where she received her B.S. in 1941. She then earned a master's degree from the University of Texas, Galveston and her Ph.D. from the University of Washington, where her husband Arthur Whiteley was at the time an assistant professor of zoology. After graduating in 1951, Whiteley returned to California and spent two years working for the United States Atomic Energy Commission.

== Academic career ==
Whiteley returned to the University of Washington in 1953 and became a full professor in 1965. She held several leadership roles with the American Society for Microbiology, chairing its division of physiology and its publications board; she served as the society's president in 1976. Whiteley also chaired a committee for collaboration in microbiology research between scientists in the US and the Soviet Union.

== Research ==
Whiteley's research focused on the physiology of bacteria. She is best known for work with colleague Ernest Schnepf studying insecticidal proteins (known as Cry proteins) found in the bacterium Bacillus thuringiensis. This work laid the foundation for genetically modified organisms that transgenically express insecticidal proteins.

== Personal life ==
Whiteley met her husband Arthur as a student at Berkeley. He held a professorship at the University of Washington when she began her Ph.D. research there. Her research and success at earning research funding have been credited with prompting the university to revise its rules against employing both members of a married couple as faculty.

Helen died in 1990 at age 69. Years later, Arthur founded the Helen Riaboff Whiteley Center in her honor, which is located at the Friday Harbor Laboratories and is designed as a working retreat for scientists, scholars and artists. Arthur died after a brief illness in 2013 at age 96.
