= Richard Whiteley (disambiguation) =

Richard Whiteley (1943-2005) was a British broadcaster.

Richard Whiteley, Whitelegh, or Whitley may also refer to:

- Richard H. Whiteley (1830–1890), U.S. Representative and U.S. Senator-elect from Georgia
- Richard Whitelegh, Member of Parliament (MP) for Dartmouth and Totnes
- Richard Whitley, American screenwriter and producer
