= Arthur Whiteley =

American zoologist

- Born: 1916; Michigan
- Died: April 15, 2013 (aged 96–97); Seattle, Washington
- Education: Kalamazoo College, University of Wisconsin, University of California, Berkeley
- Spouse: Helen Riaboff Whiteley
- Scientific career
- Fields: Zoology, Developmental biology
- Workplaces: University of Washington

Arthur Henry Whiteley (1916–2013) was a zoologist who spent most of his research career at the University of Washington, where he studied developmental biology using sea urchins as a model organism.

== Early life and education ==
Whiteley was born in 1916 in Michigan to English immigrants. He studied biology as an undergraduate at Kalamazoo College and then received a master's degree in zoology from the University of Wisconsin. He moved to the University of California, Berkeley for his Ph.D., which focused on early use of 32P radioisotope labeling in biology, supervised by Sumner Cushing Brooks. Whiteley then spent time at Princeton University on a war-related project on decompression sickness in aviation. He next moved to the University of Texas, Galveston and then back to California to work with Albert Tyler at the California Institute of Technology, where he was first exposed to the topic of sea urchin development.

== Academic career ==
Whiteley joined the faculty at the University of Washington in 1947, which also marked the beginning of his long association with the Friday Harbor Laboratories. Whiteley's research throughout his career focused on the development of sea urchin embryos, with particular focus on the genetic mechanisms controlling development and on the enzymes involved in sea urchin metabolism. Whiteley was recognized as a committed teacher as well as a researcher, and was noted for his long support of a program for training graduate students in developmental biology, which he directed until 1985.

== Personal life ==
Whiteley met his wife Helen Riaboff Whiteley while at the University of California, Berkeley. She established a career as a microbiologist credited with prompting the University of Washington to revise its rules against employing both members of a married couple as faculty. The Whiteleys were committed to environmental conservation; Arthur was active in promoting restrictions on fishing in Puget Sound and other local environmental causes. He served for many years as president of the Marine Environmental Consortium and spent a year as chair of the San Juan Nature Institute. Arthur founded the Helen Riaboff Whiteley Center at Friday Harbor Laboratories in his wife's memory; the center serves as a working retreat for scientists, scholars, and artists.

Arthur Whiteley died after a brief illness in 2013 at age 96.
