= House of Eternal Return =

Immersive art installation in Santa Fe, New Mexico

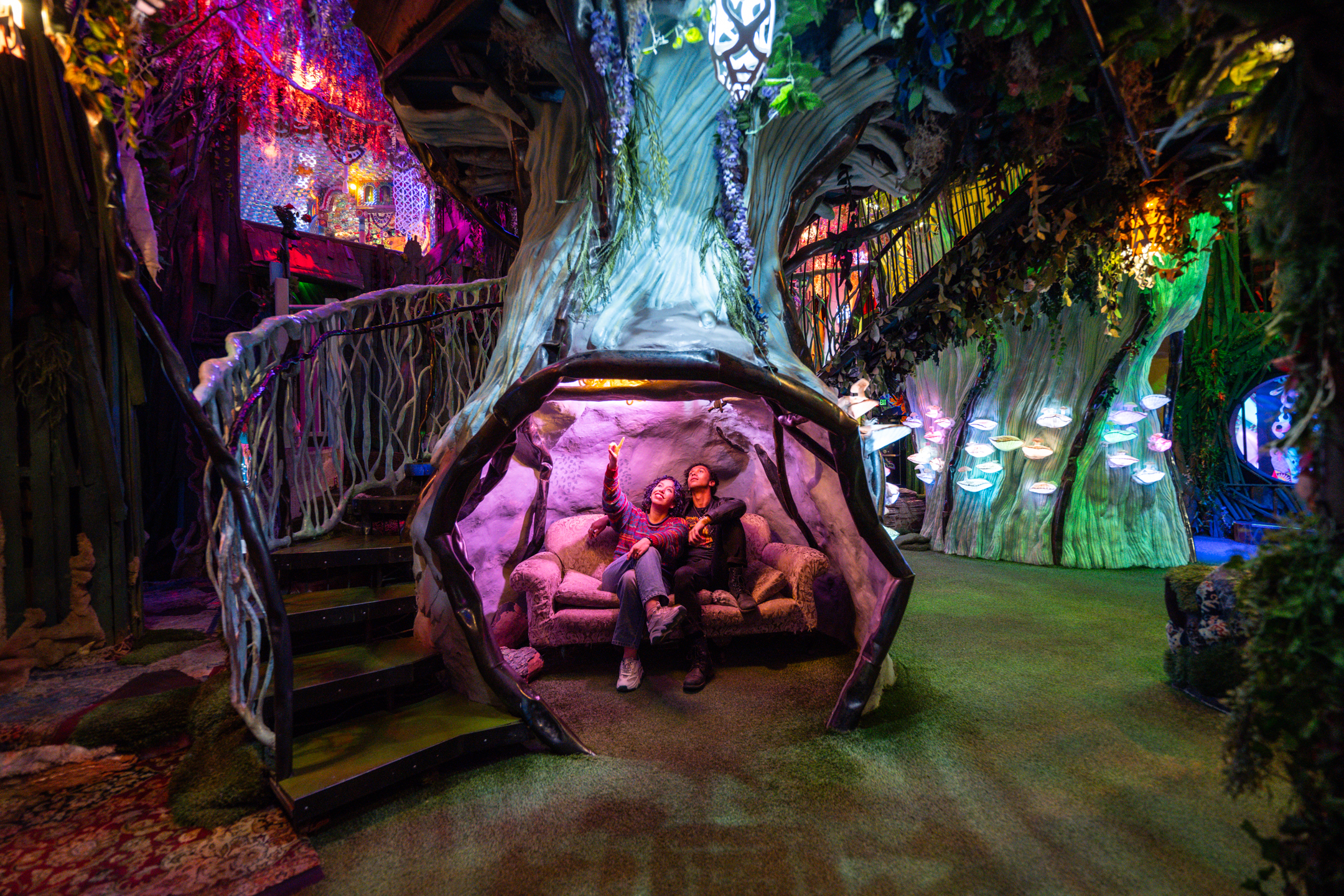
- Meow Wolf's House of Eternal Return in Santa Fe

General information
- Type: Immersive art exhibition
- Location: Santa Fe, New Mexico, United States, 1352 Rufina Cir, Santa Fe, NM 87507
- Opened: March 17, 2016
- Owner: Meow Wolf

Technical details
- Size: 20,000 square feet (exhibition)

Website
- meowwolf.com/visit/santa-fe

House of Eternal Return is a permanent immersive art installation in Santa Fe, New Mexico, created and operated by Meow Wolf. It opened in March 2016 inside a 33,000 sq ft (3,100 m^{2}) former bowling alley (Silva Lanes) and contains a roughly 20,000 sq ft (1,900 m^{2}) walk-through exhibition built by a large team of artists and collaborators. The project received early financial support from author George R. R. Martin for acquisition and refurbishment of the building.

== Development ==
Meow Wolf formed in 2008 as a Santa Fe–based art collective producing temporary, collaborative installations. In 2014–2015 the group pursued a permanent venue; Martin pledged about $2.7 million toward purchase and renovation of the former Silva Lanes property on Rufina Circle. Local reporting placed the building at approximately 33,000 sq ft (3,100 m^{2}). The installation was built over roughly two years by more than 100 artists and collaborators and opened to the public in March 2016.

== Design ==
The installation centers on a full-scale Victorian-style house constructed inside the exhibition space; hidden passageways and portals (including a refrigerator and fireplace) connect to other environments across multiple rooms and corridors. Trade and local coverage describe more than 70 rooms and interactive elements across the exhibition’s footprint.

== History ==
The site closed during the COVID-19 pandemic and reopened on March 19, 2021, with capacity limits and reduced operating days.

== Reception ==
Coverage at opening characterized the installation as a large, multiroom immersive environment built inside a former bowling alley. In its first year, the venue reported attendance of about 400,000; trade press placed first-year revenue at roughly $6–7 million. House of Eternal Return received a 2017 Thea Award from the Themed Entertainment Association. The complex also functions as a small music venue; local and national coverage notes a capacity of roughly 400 for performances.

== See also ==
- Meow Wolf
- The Real Unreal
- Omega Mart
- Convergence Station
- Radio Tave
