= Peter Whiteley (cricketer, born 1955) =

English cricketer (born 1955)

John Peter Whiteley (born 28 February 1955, Otley, Yorkshire, England) is an English former first-class cricketer.

Whiteley was a right arm off spin bowler and a right-handed batsman. He played forty five first-class matches for Yorkshire County Cricket Club from 1978 to 1982, and in six List A one day games in 1981. He took seventy first-class wickets at an average of 34.42, with a best return of 4 wickets for 14 runs against Nottinghamshire, and he made a top score of 20, against Northamptonshire.

He also appeared for the Yorkshire Second XI from 1972 to 1982, and the Gloucestershire Second XI in 1974.
