= Meow Wolf =

American company

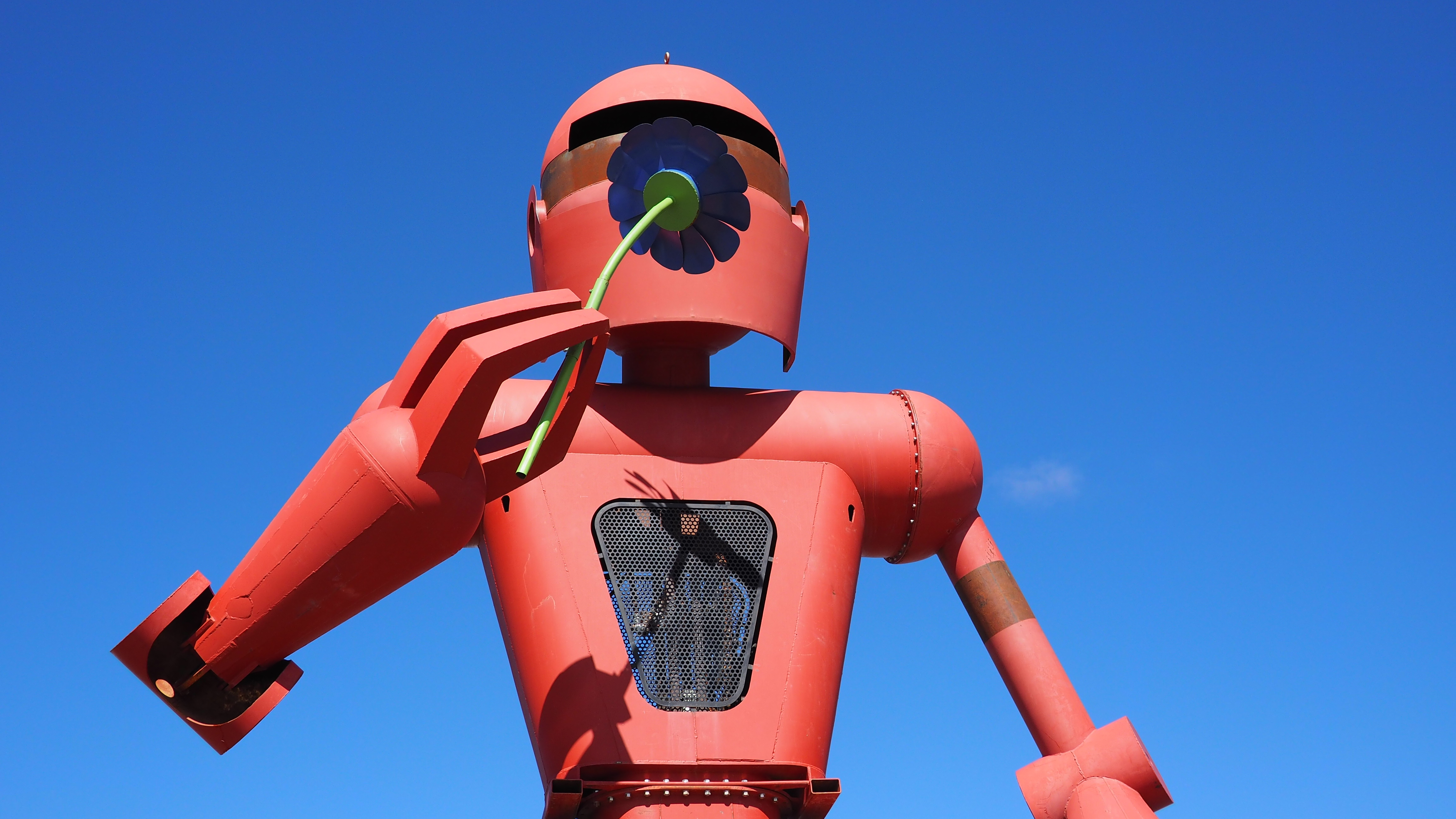
- Christian Ristow's robot sculpture in front of Meow Wolf's Santa Fe, New Mexico location
- Established: 2008
- Focus: Immersive Art, Interactive Experiences, Art Museums
- CEO: Matthew Henick
- Location: House of Eternal Return (Santa Fe, New Mexico); Omega Mart (Las Vegas, Nevada); Convergence Station (Denver, Colorado); The Real Unreal (Grapevine, Texas); Radio Tave (Houston, Texas)
- Website: meowwolf.com

Meow Wolf is an American arts and entertainment company that creates large-scale interactive and immersive art installations. Founded in 2008, its flagship attraction, House of Eternal Return in Santa Fe, New Mexico, is a 20,000-square-foot (1,900 m^{2}) facility, which includes a concert venue in addition to the main immersive art installation. In 2021 their second installation, Omega Mart, opened in Area15 in Las Vegas. A third location in Denver, Convergence Station, opened to the public on September 17, 2021. A fourth location, The Real Unreal, opened in the Grapevine Mills Mall in the Dallas-Fort Worth Metroplex on July 14, 2023. The fifth location, Radio Tave, opened in the Fifth Ward of Houston, Texas, on October 31, 2024. Meow Wolf's sixth location is planned to open in Los Angeles, California in 2026.

== History ==
Originating in Santa Fe, New Mexico, Meow Wolf was formed informally in February 2008 as an artist collective partnership by Quinn Tincher, Matt King, Matt Smith, Megan Burns and Vince Kadlubek. The partnership anarchically formed and reformed as it installed larger projects through time. Some partners tried to exclude others by claiming to exclusively own the art collective partnership via LLCs formed subsequent to the breakout Due Return project. In October 2014, Sean Di Ianni became a member of VCSME Art City LLC, as Meow Wolf joined the Creative Startups business accelerator competition that taught LLC members to form a corporation to dispossess the anarchic partnership of its intellectual property. The other members of that new 2014 LLC were members of the older MW LLC from September 2011: Matt King, Corvas Brinkerhoff, Emily Montoya, Caity Kennedy, and Vince Kadlubek, "a community of punk, quirky, artistic pals" hoping to take exclusive ownership of the 25-or-so-partner anarchic partnership supplying Santa Fe and other locales with alternative art and music venues. Having documented much of its own early visual history, Meow Wolf produced a documentary film about its own genesis, entitled Meow Wolf: Origin Story, which was released in 2018. By 2019, the collective held the works of 200 different artists and employed more than 150 people. By 2024, Meow Wolf employed 1,000 people across the country. It has received widespread praise for its impact on the New Mexico and national art scene. The name was chosen by randomly drawing two words from a hat at the first meeting of the collective (everyone present put two scraps of paper with a word on each one in).

=== Early projects 2008–2014 ===
In the early days, the artists' first large-scale venture working outside the establishment represented in Santa Fe's galleries was The Due Return, a more than 70-foot-long (21 m), two-story ship installed in 2011 into the Muñoz Waxman Gallery of the Center for Contemporary Arts and filled with rooms and objects suggesting details of implied inhabitants' lives. This was partly funded by a microgrant from the city government. Its success -- a record CCA crowd at the opening -- prompted an invalid June 2, 2011 Meow Wolf trademark application by David Loughridge (incorrectly applying as an individual, even though the entire Meow Wolf art collective partnership actually conceived and installed the immersive art). The David Loughridge estate assigned the invalid Meow Wolf trademark (Serial# 85336601) to Meow Wolf, Inc. in January 2017

Some other notable projects include: "Biome Neuro Norb" (2008), a science fiction-inspired installation, "Auto Wolf" (2009), an installation centered around the destruction and reuse of a donated car, "The Moon is to Live On" (2010), a multimedia theatrical play, "Geodecadent I" and "Geodecadent II" (2010), a series of installations based on geodesic domes.

In pursuit of teaching collaborative arts practices, Meow Wolf formed CHIMERA in 2011. In 2012 CHIMERA worked with approximately one thousand Santa Fe students to create Omega Mart, an installation in the form of a fictitious grocery store stocked with "satirical goods". Omega Mart was deliberately placed away from Santa Fe's arts district to attract a more diverse audience. The Omega Mart concept was revived at Area15 in Las Vegas in 2021. In 2013, CHIMERA began working with the Albuquerque Museum of Art and History's classroom mentorship program for gifted students on an installation named "Project Dreamscape". As of 2022 CHIMERA was no longer active.

Meow Wolf has built notable shows outside of Santa Fe. "Glitteropolis" (2011), at the New Mexico State University Art Gallery, used 50 pounds of glitter. "Nucleotide" (2013) was a pastel, cave-like installation in Chicago's Thomas Robertello Gallery. The majority of "Nucleotide" was conceived and built in Chicago over a three-month period by 18 members of the collective.

=== 2014–2019 ===
In 2016 Meow Wolf opened its first permanent installation, House of Eternal Return, built by a collective of 135 artists in Santa Fe.

Meow Wolf became a Certified B Corporation in 2017.

In January 2018, Meow Wolf announced two new art complexes, in Las Vegas and Denver. On November 29, 2018, the documentary Meow Wolf: Origin Story was released in movie theaters around the United States in a one-time only showing. In 2019, plans for a Phoenix attraction were announced, featuring a 75,000-square-foot (7,000 m^{2}) exhibit with a 400-room hotel. The Phoenix project did not actualize. Meow Wolf also announced the same year a permanent exhibition in Washington, DC. The exhibition, a partnership with the Cafritz Foundation, was planned to open in 2022 and would have been a three-level, 75,000-square-foot structure located in the Fort Totten community. The Washington, DC project did not actualize.

=== 2020–2022 ===
The New York Times Magazine featured Meow Wolf in an article titled "Can an Art Collective Become the Disney of the Experience Economy?", describing the challenges faced by the group's founders in shifting from work as underground artists to running a multimillion-dollar corporation. In early 2021 the firm announced that they would abandon their plans for a Meow Wolf themed hotel in Phoenix, although still planned an exhibition in the city. The permanent exhibition in Washington, DC, in Fort Totten, was also canceled later in the year. In 2021 the permanent exhibition in Las Vegas, a redo of their concept Omega Mart, opened in January and the Denver art complex called Convergence Station in September.

Meow Wolf co-founder and senior creative director Matt King died on July 9, 2022.

=== 2022-Present ===
On May 11, 2022, Meow Wolf announced The Real Unreal, an experience to be opened in Grapevine Mills. The experience would later open on July 14, 2023.

== Projects ==
=== House of Eternal Return ===
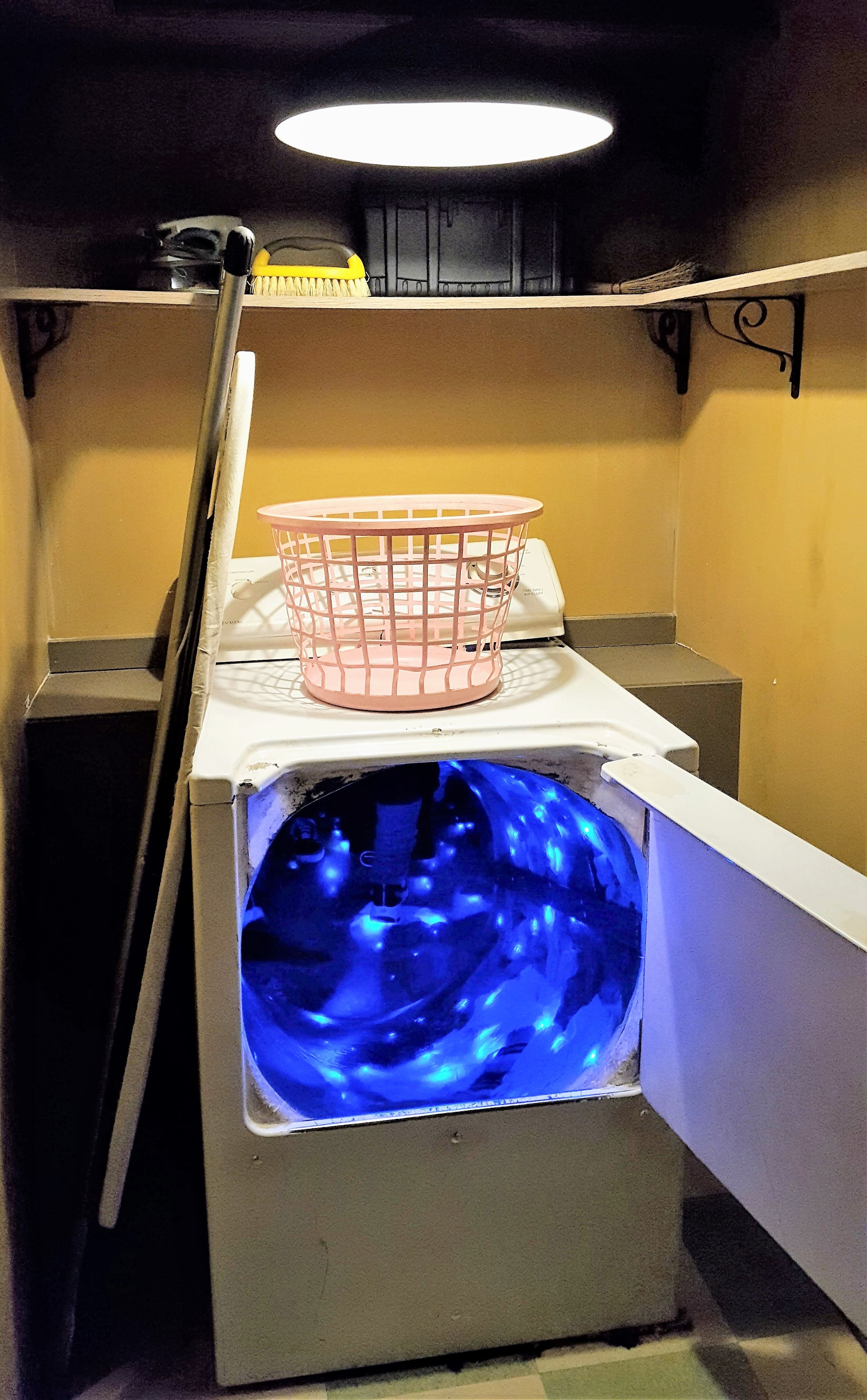
In a typically unpredictable corner of the House of Eternal Return, an ordinary-looking clothes dryer in a drab utility closet becomes a "dryer portal," opening into a light-filled tunnel visitors can slide down to discover a room full of lost socks.

In January 2015, author George R. R. Martin pledged $2.7 million to renovate and lease a vacant bowling alley to create a permanent facility for Meow Wolf. This was supplemented by additional funding, including $50,000 from the city of Santa Fe and $100,000 from a crowd-funding campaign. The installation, called House of Eternal Return opened March 18, 2016. It received a 2017 Thea Award from the Themed Entertainment Association and has been cited as the tenth best music venue in the United States. Multiple musical acts have filmed music videos at House of Eternal Return including The Revivalists and T-Pain.

=== Meow Wolf's Kaleidoscape ===
2018 Meow Wolf's Kaleidoscape, an "other-worldly" dark ride based around the concept of entering a piece of art, was announced for Elitch Gardens Theme Park in Denver, Colorado, replacing Ghost Blasters. The exhibit debuted during Elitch Garden's 2019 summer season; the Denver Post described Kaleidoscape as "a hallucinogenic gallery of neon art." The attraction was intended as a prequel to their Denver exhibit, Convergence Station, with the ride experience being focused around the Quantum Department of Transportation harnessing the power of a Cosmic Egg to open a path to a new universe.

=== Omega Mart ===
In January 2018, Meow Wolf announced a second interactive art installation in Las Vegas, Nevada as anchor attraction at a new retail, art and entertainment complex called Area15. Opened in 2021, Omega Mart is a 52,000-square-foot (4,800 m^{2}) multisensory grocery store that blends narrative storytelling, technical wizardry, and commerce. Omega Mart aims to guide guests into fantastical areas with themes examining American consumerism and corporate responsibility. The exhibit features more than 325 writers, painters, sculptors, actors, lighting designers, musicians and more.

The Omega Mart concept was reused from an earlier temporary installation in Santa Fe. The exhibit follows the hypothetical corporation that owns Omega Mart, Dramcorp, in an alternate dimension. In this dimension, they harness a power titled "The Source" to continue to sell their products. In its first year it had over 1 million visitors.

=== Convergence Station ===
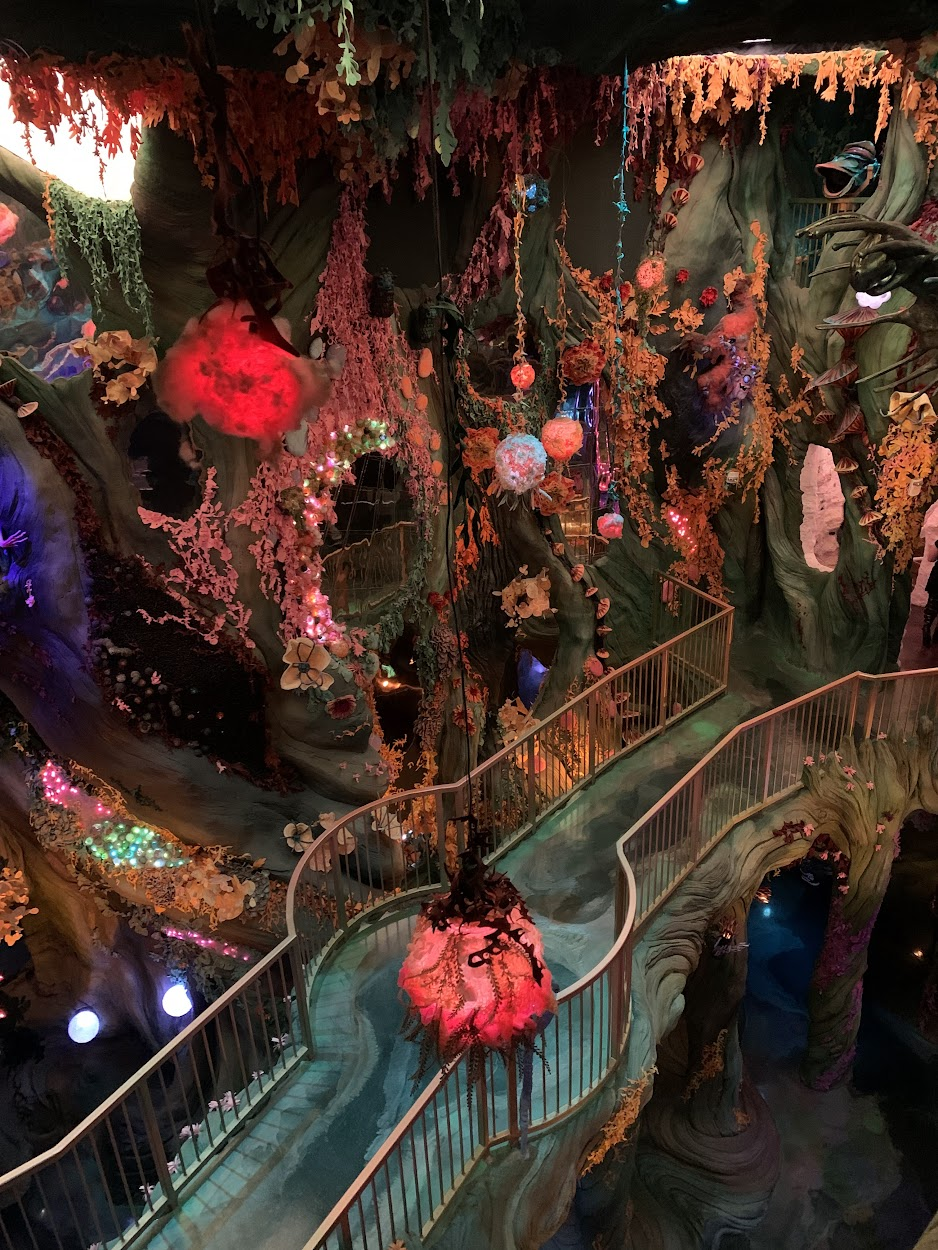
Inside Convergence Station, 2022

In 2018, Meow Wolf announced plans for a venue in downtown Denver, Colorado, at I-25 and Colfax Ave. It opened September 2021. The 90,000-square-foot (8,400 m^{2}) building is Meow Wolf's largest installation, rising 30 feet over three elevated viaducts and employing more than 100 local artists (including indigenous artists) specializing in a wide range of media, including architecture, sculpture, painting, photography, video production, cross-reality (AR/VR/MR), music, audio engineering, narrative writing, costuming, and performance.

Convergence Station is presented as an interdimensional transport hub of the Quantum Department of Transportation linking Earth to the Convergence of Worlds, named for a cosmic Convergence event that resulted in fragments of four planets fusing together, consisting of the C Street of an ecumenopolis named Immensity, the crystal mines of the Ossuary, the frozen world of Eemia, and a cosmic superorganism named Numina.

It houses several exhibits, including a large-scale physical fabrication of The Cathedral' that the company digitized for The Infinite Playa, a recognized universe in the Burning Man's multiverse.

A rotating exhibit of local artists is on display in Convergence Station's Galleri Gallery; the first to be featured is Denver's Lumonics collective, with works from light art pioneers Mel and Dorothy Tanner.

Convergence Station also features tributes to Denver's "Gang of 19" (who would later become the organization ADAPT) who played a central role in making mass transit accessible to disabled people.

=== Vortex Music Festival ===
One of Meow Wolf's music festivals, Vortex, was held in Taos, New Mexico, in 2018 and 2019, then paused for two years due to COVID and moved to Denver in 2022.

=== The Real Unreal ===
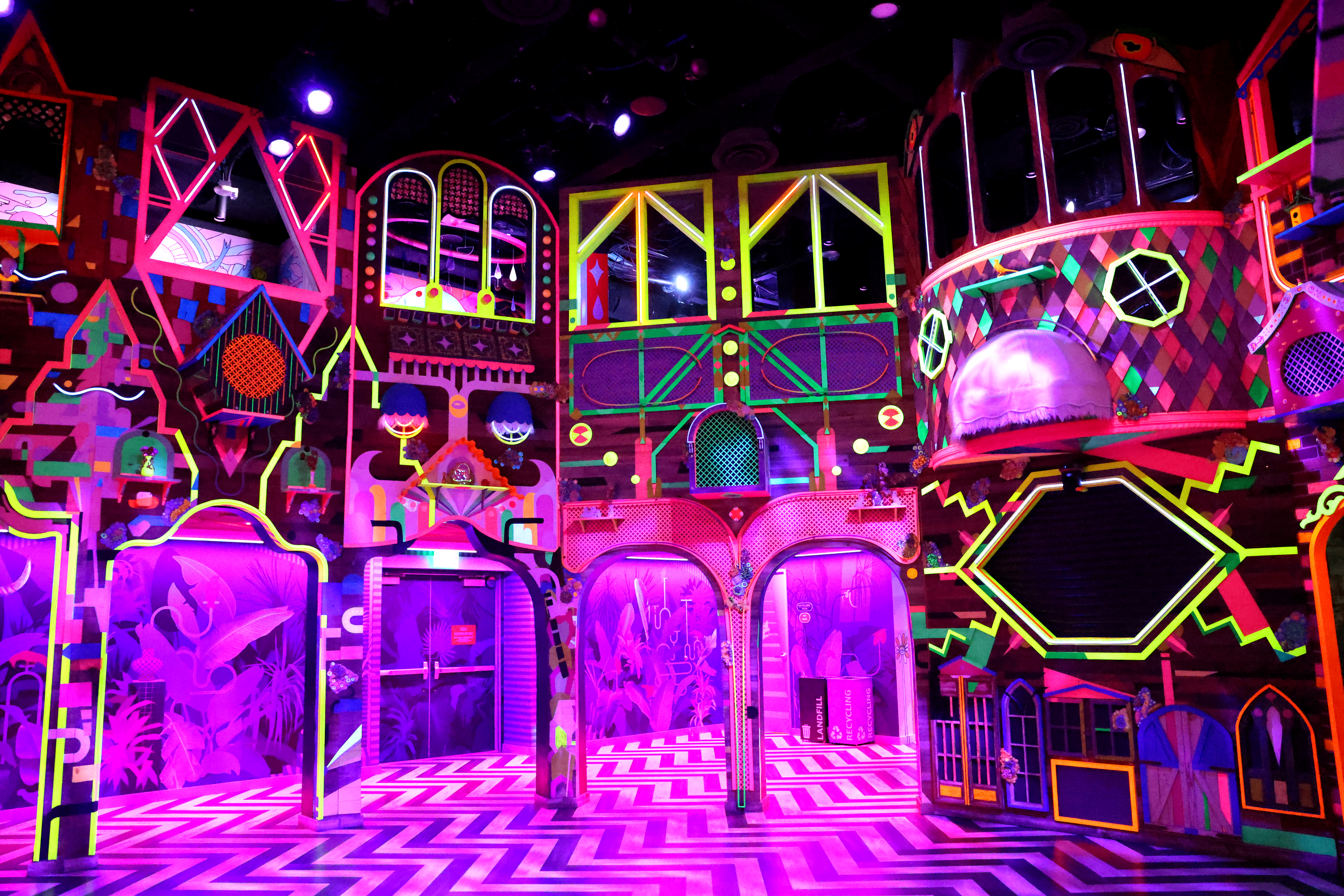
The Neon Kingdom at Meow Wolf's The Real Unreal in Grapevine.

In May 2022, Meow Wolf announced its fourth permanent exhibition, located in Grapevine (a suburb in the Mid-Cities region of the Dallas–Fort Worth metroplex) situated in the Grapevine Mills Mall in a former 40,000 square feet (3,716 m^{2}) big box store. In May 2023, the name of the exhibit was revealed to be The Real Unreal, and it opened on July 14, 2023.

The Real Unreal, conceived by author LaShawn Wanak, tells the story of Ruby and Gordon Delaney, who moved to the house in Bolingbrook, Illinois, where Gordon taught music and Ruby cultivated a garden. As they aged, their daughter Carmen moved back home to care for them and started a spice blend company named Ruby's Garden. Carmen's friend LaVerne Fuqua and her son Jared also moved into the house. The exhibit reveals how the house amplifies the lives of its occupants and how it becomes a beacon for the family's energy during a crisis. Jared and Gordon befriend an imaginary character named Happy Garry, and Jared eventually goes missing through a portal in the closet. The exhibit explores the concept of The Real Unreal, where imagination comes to rest and creativity can transform everything it touches. Visitors are invited to explore the house and the world beyond the portal to understand the mysteries and connections between these characters and the realms they encounter.

Certain spaces within The Real Unreal may feel familiar to Meow Wolf devotees, as they harken back to the original Meow Wolf in Santa Fe, creating cross-exhibition connections and expanding the Meow Wolf story universe. Meow Wolf Co-Founder Emily Montoya reflects that the house and the concept of 'eternal return' are powerful motifs that catalyzed Meow Wolf's transformation from a scrappy art collective into the growing company it is today."

=== Radio Tave ===
Meow Wolf's fifth permanent exhibit, Radio Tave, opened on October 31, 2024. Located in the Fifth Ward of Houston, Texas, Radio Tave tells the story of ETNL, a radio station mysteriously teleported to another dimension.

=== Future plans ===
In May 2024, Meow Wolf announced it would open its sixth permanent location in West Los Angeles, to be built in a movie theater in the Cinemark Complex at Howard Hughes L.A. It is scheduled to open in late 2026. A seventh location, to be at the South Street Seaport in southern Manhattan New York City, was announced in March 2025.

In June 2025, Meow Wolf announced plans to explore expanding the Meow Wolf Universe globally beyond the walls of physical exhibitions through a mobile application they're prototyping with Niantic Spatial's geospatial AI technology.

== COVID-19 pandemic and labor issues ==
In 2020, the outbreak of the COVID-19 pandemic led to the delay of Meow Wolf's development plans in all locations, including layoffs of more than half its staff in Denver. A preliminary collective bargaining group was formed in late 2020 in response to pandemic-related economic challenges, seeking more worker input.

Due to the pandemic, House of Eternal Return closed from March 2020 to March 2021. They reopened at 25% capacity, which was only 625 people a day, for four days a week. The company also temporarily laid off some 200 employees and placed another 56 on furlough. This spearheaded an ongoing unionization effort formed by the Meow Wolf Workers Collective. In 2019, the company policy was that all Meow Wolf employees earn a minimum of $17 an hour. But in 2022, they ratified their contract with Meow Wolf calling for $1 million to go towards wage increases, where each artist gets paid no less than $60,000 annually, and exhibition workers at least $18 an hour.

Various allegations have been made against the company, and certain individuals it employs, including, among other things, that it has engaged in aggressive union busting, questionable hiring practices, racial and gender discrimination, and failing to provide proportionate representation for regional artists from New Mexico, Arizona, Colorado, Nevada, and Texas. Lauren Oliver sued Meow Wolf, Inc and Vince Kadlubek in 2020 for changing the favorable art collective terms on her House of Eternal Return Space Owl creation from her owning the copyright and Meow Wolf owning the physical installation to the standard corporate work-for-hire terms, which gave VCMSE Art City LLC and MW LLC both the physical installation and the copyright. Her attorney, Jesse Boyd, said “...we are more than prepared to prove at trial that Defendants Vince Kadlubek and Meow Wolf, Inc. impersonated an art collective to misappropriate the creations of dozens of local artists, including Lauren, as well as the labor of hundreds of volunteers and the trust and financial support of the entire Santa Fe community to launch their corporate entertainment empire.”

In 2021, Meow Wolf settled a workplace discrimination lawsuit.

== See also ==
- House of Eternal Return
- Omega Mart
- The Real Unreal
- Radio Tave
- Convergence Station
