= Omega Mart =

Immersive art exhibit in Las Vegas

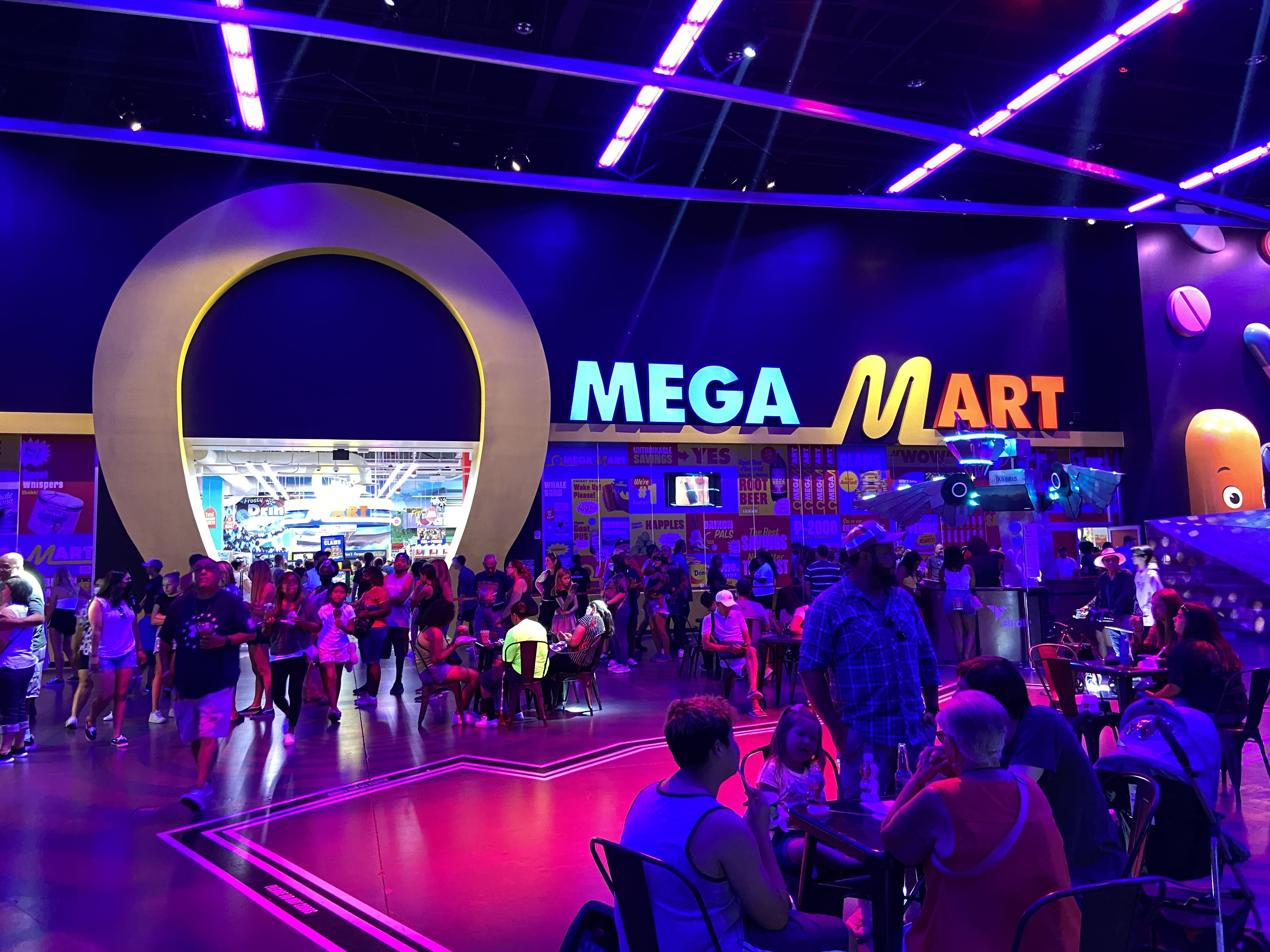
- Entrance into Omega Mart in 2021

General information
- Location: Las Vegas, Nevada, United States, 3215 S Rancho Dr #100
- Opened: February 18, 2021
- Owner: Meow Wolf

Technical details
- Size: 52,000 ft^{2} (4,800 m^{2})

Website
- www.omegamart.com

Omega Mart (stylized as Ωmega Mart) is an interactive art installation created by American arts company Meow Wolf and located in the AREA15 complex in Las Vegas. Those entering the installation explore a supermarket, from which they can access various other areas and uncover a narrative. It features contributions from over 300 artists and designers. Omega Mart is an example of an alternate reality game. The overarching plot and lore of the Omega Mart Universe is still being solved using various clues (both online and clues present in the physical store).

Omega Mart features a variety of products available for purchase that parody common consumer products, some of which were created by Meow Wolf collaborators, and some of which existed prior to inclusion in the installation. Those items include Mammoth Chunks, Organic Moth Milk, Nut Free Salted Peanuts, Gender Fluid, and Plausible Deniability, one of the three brands of laundry detergent. Piñatas of the Seven Deadly Sins, designed by artist Justin Favela, are also available for purchase. The installation also features a secret bar, Datamosh, which serves eight specialty cocktails.

== History ==
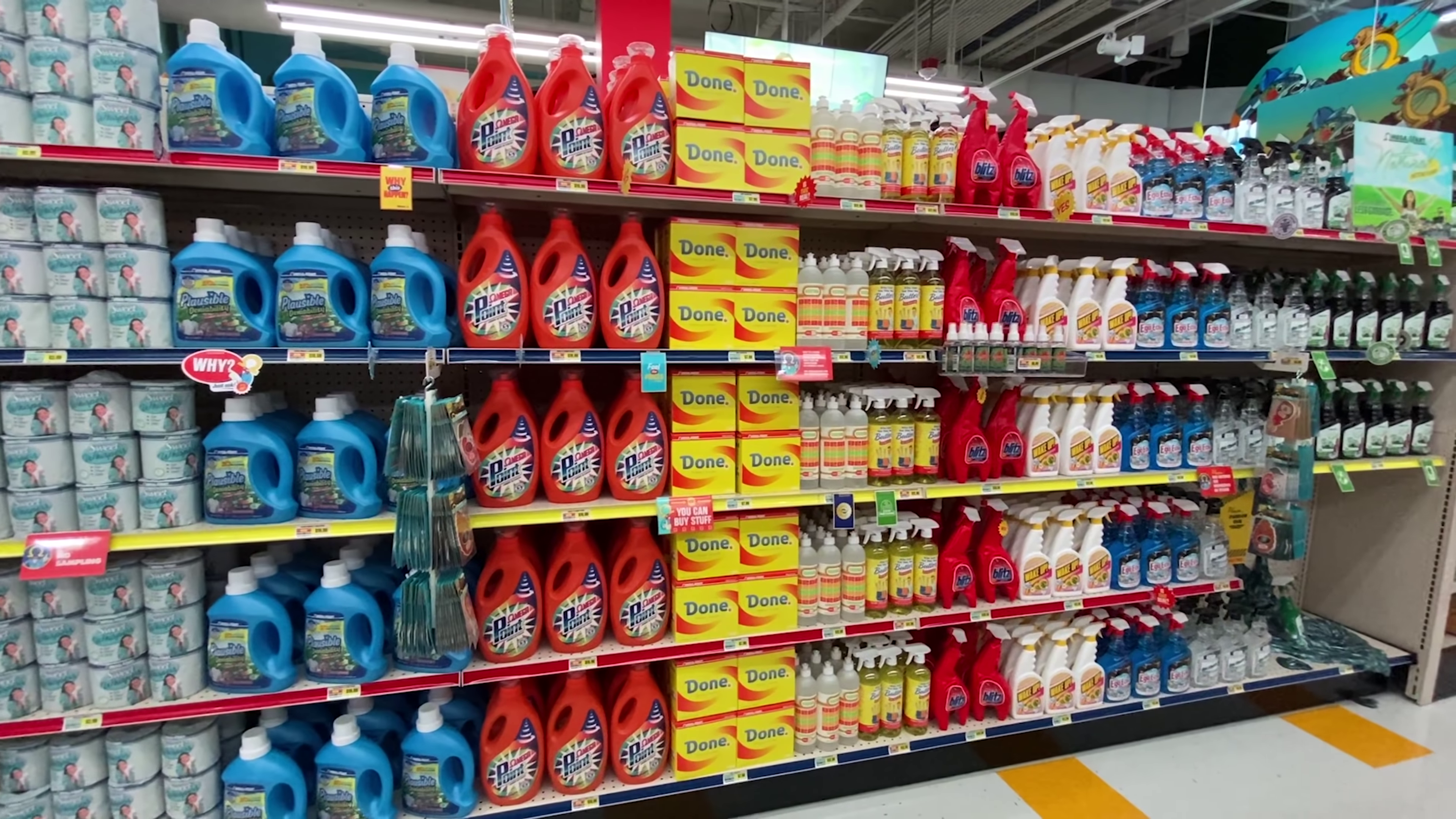
Shelves of products at Omega Mart

The concept for Omega Mart originated in 2009, when artists created a DIY pop-up grocery store exhibit which, according to the Las Vegas Review-Journal, was essentially "little more than cinder-block shelves with bottles of colored water". It was attempted again in 2012, as Meow Wolf's Chimera educational division worked with approximately one thousand students in Santa Fe, New Mexico's public schools to fill a mock grocery store with handmade fake products. Both original installations were temporary, with the second one opening on July 8, 2012, and closing September 20 of that year.

In January 2018, Meow Wolf announced they would launch their second permanent attraction (the first being Santa Fe's House of Eternal Return) in Las Vegas, which would be an anchor tenant of retail and entertainment complex AREA15. Omega Mart was originally planned to launch in 2020, but its launch was delayed due to the COVID-19 pandemic. In August 2020, Meow Wolf announced the project would focus on a supermarket called Omega Mart, and was expected to open in January 2021. In January 2021, the opening date of the installation was announced, and it opened on February 18, 2021.

Various commercials for Omega Mart have been released, and have been noted for their unusualness and surrealism. A commercial for its opening, which featured Willie Nelson's face deepfaked onto another person's body, was described by Shelby Stewart of the Houston Chronicle as giving Texans "an idea of what a grocery store ad on LSD might be like". Various later commercials were described by Reid McCarter of The A.V. Club as having a "weird '90s" aesthetic, and by Rob Beschizza, writing for Boing Boing, as perfect examples of a certain "darkly humorous, haunted cosmic consumer horror".

In June 2025, Omega Mart was featured in Season 2, Episode 1 of the PBS series Human Footprint. Omega Mart was also featured in videos that aired on the Food Theory YouTube channel in August and November 2021, one of which featured Matpat and his wife Stephanie Cordato visiting the installation.

== See also ==
- Meow Wolf
- House of Eternal Return
- The Real Unreal
