= The Professor of Practical Jokes =

- Short story by Evelyn Sharp
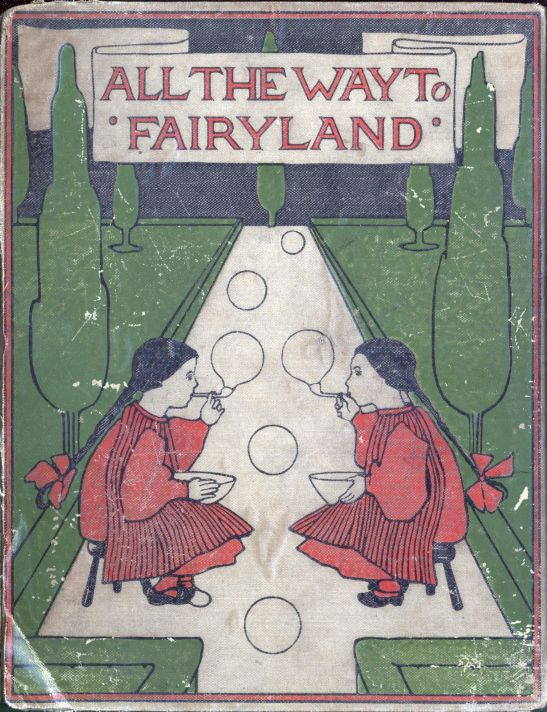
- Illustration by Mrs. Percy Dearmer
- Country: Britain
- Language: English
- Genre(s): Literary fairy tale

Publication
- Published in: All the Way to Fairyland. Fairy Stories. First Edition.
- Publication type: Fairy tale collection
- Publisher: John Lane
- Media type: Print
- Publication date: 1898

Chronology
The Wonderful Toymaker	The Doll that Came Straight From Fairyland

"The Professor of Practical Jokes" is a literary fairy tale published in 1898 by British suffragist and author Evelyn Sharp (1829–1955). The story tells of a good yet boring king who is tricked into marrying one of his courtiers daughters, who brings excitement into his dull kingdom. The story is one of many published in Sharp's collection, All The Way To Fairyland: Fairy Stories.

== Plot ==
The story begins by introducing a King named Grumbelo. His kingdom is well governed and he is well loved, but his people find him dull and are quite bored. One day some of his courtiers, one of whom is the Professor of Practical Jokes, approach him and suggest he find himself a wife in order to bring excitement to the kingdom. Grumbelo reluctantly agrees and sets his criteria: his wife must be the most beautiful, the most silent, and the most foolish princess in the world. With these specifications in mind, the king's courtiers begin gathering as many beautiful princesses as possible and present them to Grumbelo, who rejects each and every one of them because they aren't silent enough. After their failure, the courtiers once again approach Grumbelo and inform him of a princess who meets all of his criteria; however, she does not desire to marry him and has fled the kingdom. Intrigued by the notion that someone would not want to marry him, he decides to set out and find her. After extensive searching, the king comes upon a little house in the forest, guarded by a dragon. By conversing with the dragon he discovers that Lady Whimsical lives in the house. She shows no romantic interest in the king, but agrees to let him visit her for a period of time each day. The king is persistent in seeing her daily, but eventually grows tired of her silence, causing him to lose patience and run away . He realizes that he would like a wife who speaks, and guided by the Wise Woman of the Wood, he decides to return and admit his foolishness to Lady Whimsical. She happily welcomes him and admits a secret of her own: she hid herself on purpose because she heard he was looking for a princess and she wanted him to find her! There was never a princess for him to find, only her: the daughter of the Professor of Practical Jokes. Grumbelo and Lady Whimsical then return to the kingdom and marry, and the kingdom is happy as can be.

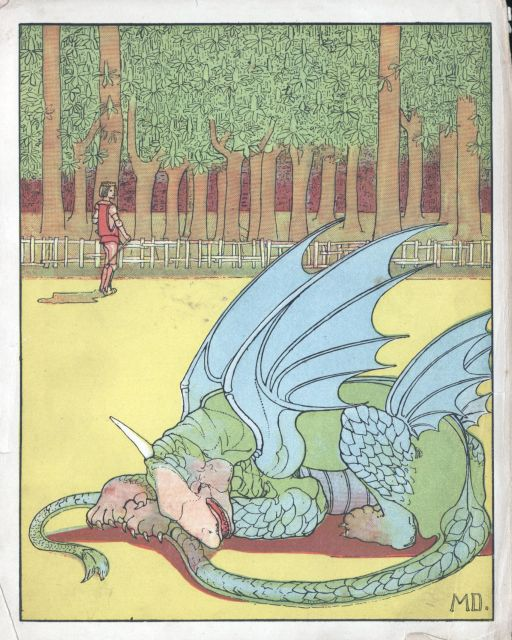
"The Lady Whimsical never speaks", said the dragon.

== Character descriptions ==
Grumbelo: The protagonist of the fairy tale, is a young, handsome, and talented King, who also happens to be a big bore.

The Royal Comptroller of Whole Holidays: A courtier of Grumbelo's, who is out of work due to the serious ruling of the King. He issues a proclamation that the country should take a whole holiday while Grumbelo is out of the Kingdom.

The Professor of Practical Jokes: A courtier of Grumbelo's, who concocts the plan to trick Grumbelo into marrying his daughter, Lady Whimsical.

The Dragon: Speaks for and lives outside the house of Lady Whimsical.

Lady Whimsical: The daughter of the Professor of Practical Jokes. She hides from the King so he will find her and believe she is the perfect princess. She becomes his Queen.

== About the author ==
Primarily a journalist, Evelyn Sharp also wrote fantasy, novels, an account of dance, studies of children, a biography, an autobiography and a comic libretto. In the composition of her literature for children, Sharp "followed her own advice, which is mentioned in The Books Children Like (1922), that writing should make children “feel on a level with the author”'.

According to the Oxford Encyclopedia of Children's Literature "Evelyn Sharp's collections Wymps and Other Fairy Tales (1897) and All the Way to Fairyland (1897), are contrasting works that take pleasure in turning things upside-down. Sharp enjoyed writing "anti-fairies", whom she called 'wymps', which emphasized common themes of people playing practical jokes and causing chaos".

== About the collection ==
All the Way to Fairyland: Fairy Stories is a collection of short stories and illustrations published for children. Stories in the collection include:

- The Country Called Nonamia
- Why the Wymps Cried
- The Story of Honey and Sunny
- The Little Princess and the Poet
- The Wonderful Toymaker
- The Professor of Practical Jokes
- The Doll that Came Straight From Fairyland
- Those Wymps Again!
