= Somebody Else's Prince =

- Short story by Evelyn Sharp
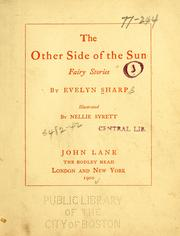
- Country: Britain
- Language: English
- Genre: Children's literature

Publication
- Published in: The Other Side of the Sun
- Publisher: John Lane
- Media type: Print
- Publication date: 1900
- Pages: 28

"Somebody Else's Prince" belongs to a collection of short stories, named The Other Side of the Sun, written by Evelyn Sharp (1869–1955) in 1900. Other stories in this collection include: The Weird Witch of the Willowherb, The Magician's Tea-Party, The Hundredth Princess, The Tears of Princess Prunella, The Palace on the Floor, The Lady Daffodilia, and The Kite That Went to the Moon.

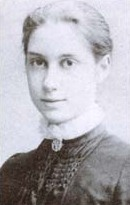
Evelyn Sharp (1869-1955)

== About the author ==
Evelyn Sharp (1869–1955) was a key figure in two of the major women's suffrage societies in Britain: the militant Women's Social and Political Union, and the United Suffragists. She helped to found the latter and became editor of Votes for Women during the First World War. She was twice imprisoned and became a tax resister. An established author who had published in The Yellow Book, she was especially well known for her children's fiction.

== Summary ==
A King and a Queen have 5 children: four sons, and one daughter. The five children have five gardens that are all lined up in a row. The daughter's name is Princess Gentianella and her garden is the most extravagant out of the five. Her garden lies at the end of the row with a stonewall surrounding it. The King and the Queen built the wall higher whenever the princess grew to prevent her from seeing over it. They thought it clever and wise to prevent the young princess form seeing the world that lay on the other side of her garden.

As the four princes grew up they left their gardens. The youngest of the 4 princes, Prince Hyacinth, came and said goodbye to his young sister when it was his turn to leave. Princess Gentianella was very upset since she would now have to play in the gardens all by herself, but her brother tried to cheer her up saying, “but perhaps, if you wait long enough, some other prince will come into your garden, and then you can ask him to play with you.”.

On the same day that her brother leaves, a wymp appears on her wall. The Princess Gentianella asked the wymp what is on the other side of her wall. He teases the Princess telling her about the world on the other side. The wymp helps Princess Gentianella up onto the wall so she can see for herself.

To her surprise, the Princess finds another garden on the other side of her wall. As she looks at this garden she discovers that there is also a Prince. His name was Prince Amaryllis and he belongs to the Kingdom that lay on the other side of Princess Gentianella's wall. Prince Amaryllis is glad to see someone but he doesn't know how it is possible. The Prince's Kingdom is invisible to the eyes of other countries. His Kingdom had become invisible when the Prince's great-grandfather forgot to ask the Witch to dance with him. This gesture had offended the Witch and she experimented with the country turning it invisible. The reason why Prince Amaryllis was working in the garden was because he was trying to disenchant his kingdom. A King's son must spend a full year in this garden and try to make the flowers grow. If he fails he is sentenced to death.

The Prince comes over the wall into the Princess' garden in hope of her showing him how to grow a beautiful garden. They spend their days walking around and talking about many things. Even after the day was over and the Prince went back over the wall, they would remember more things that they forgot to talk about. The days passed and they always played in the Princess' garden since it was a nicer garden than the Prince's.

One afternoon Princess Gentianella goes to meet her Prince Amaryllis. As she approaches him he looks sad. The year had come to an end and he had failed to grow any flowers in his garden. He is glad to be executed, which surprises Princess Gentianella. Prince Amaryllis explains to Princess Gentianella that if he had somehow made the flowers grow that he would have to marry the Witch's daughter, Anemone. Princess Gentianella is not pleased with this news. He had been somebody else's prince the whole time that they had been playing together. The Prince tries to reason with her, saying that he had no choice but to agree with the terms. It was the only way to disenchant his kingdom. Princess Gentianella is not impressed and leaves her Prince at the wall. Her parents notice that she was upset and prompts her to tell them what was the matter. Princess Gentianella's mother tries to comfort her by saying,“you will soon find another prince in your garden. 'But not that Prince', wept the poor little Princess.".

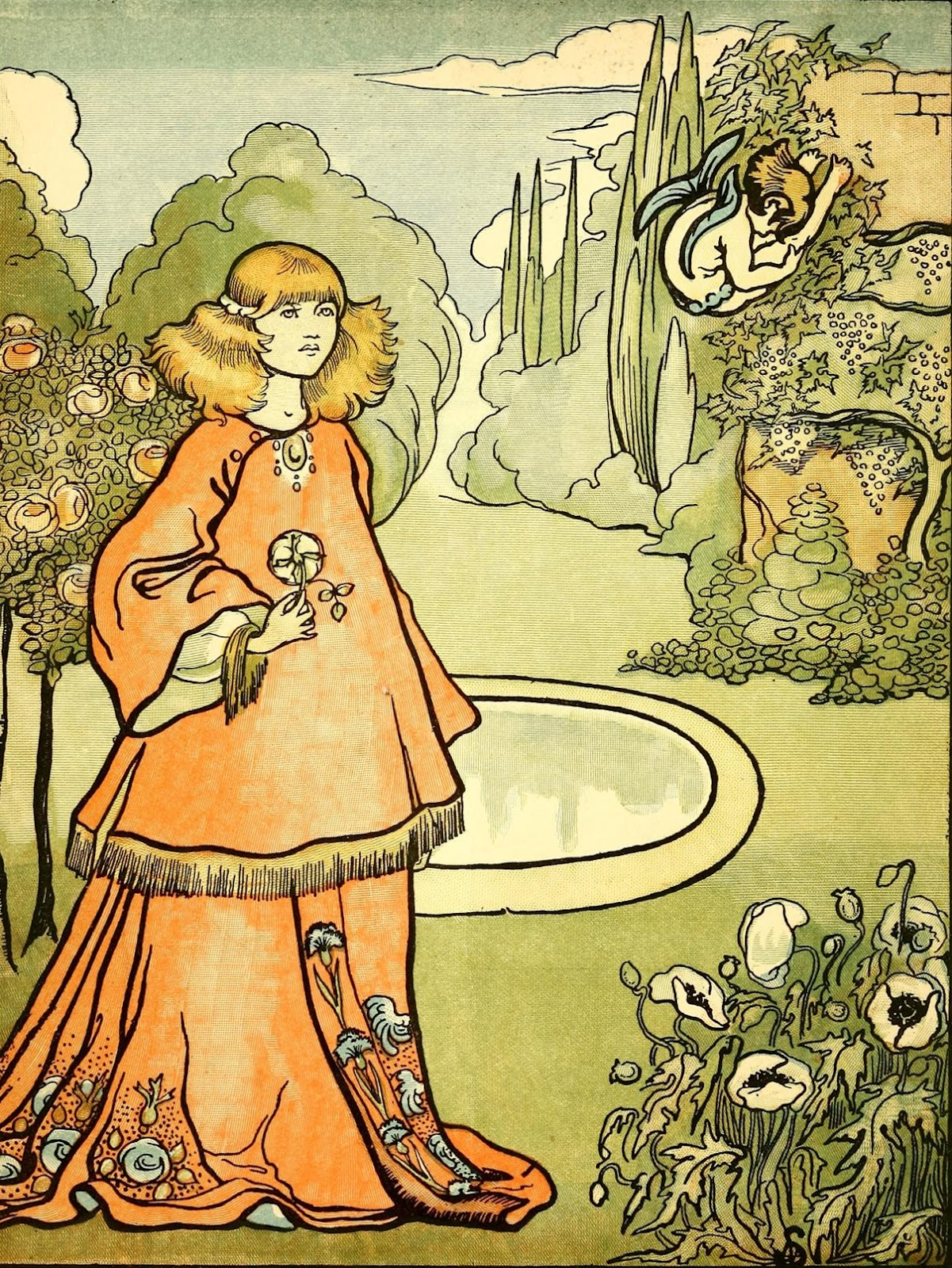
Illustration by Nellie Syrette

Princess Gentianella soon gets over her anger at Prince Amaryllis. The Prince still had failed to grow flowers in his garden. The Princess runs out the next morning to re-patch her friendship with her Prince. To her great astonishment the Prince was not on the other side of the wall. The Princess calls his name but she receives no answer. The Princess then jumps down into the Prince's garden. She still can't see the invisible country but she could hear the voices of its citizens. “'Our Prince cannot make the flowers grow, and the Witch has taken him away to be executed,' was what they were saying.”.

Once Princess Gentianella hears what the citizens are saying, she drops down and starts to cry. Wherever her tears landed, flowers began to grow. She exclaims her excitement and the wymp reappears on the wall. She could hear the voices of the kingdom shouting their excitement at the sudden flowers in the garden. The wymp pointed out that now Prince Amaryllis can now marry Anemone, the Witch's beautiful daughter. The Princess is once again saddened by the news, but the wymp reassures her.“'Don't you fret about that, my little dear,' he cried. 'Do you suppose the Witch's daughter wants anybody else's Prince, either?' Princess Gentianella clapped her hands with delight. 'Of course she doesn't!' she cried. 'But perhaps she does not know he is somebody else's Prince.'".

The Princess decides to find her prince and runs towards the invisible kingdom. “She ran and she ran and she ran, until the Prince's kingdom was really obliged to stop being invisible, for in all the hundred years that it had been bewitched no one had ever tried so hard to see it before. Besides, it would have been most impolite of anybody's kingdom to go on pretending that it was not there, when the Princess was so determined to pretend that it was…”. The Princess meets various characters along the way, including a lamb, a woodcutter, a fish, a sea-serpent and an old woman, whom aid her in her journey after they are warmed by her kindness. She tells everyone that she meets that the Prince will not be marrying Princess Anemone.

During her travels through the invisible kingdom, the Princess stumbles through a landscape of every season, apparently because “it is no use being particular about the time of year when there is no one to see what kind of weather you are having”. The Princess meets the old woman, who is running an experiment to see if there is anyone who is so brave of heart that the thistles do not hurt them. The Princess helps to pick thistles which cannot bear to hurt so gentle of hands as hers. As she continues, she meets a beautiful girl in the woods who is crying bitterly because her mother wants her to marry a prince when she is already somebody else's Princess. The Princess tells her that she is in a similar situation. It turns out that the beautiful girl is the witch's daughter, Anemone, who is in love with the Princess’ brother, Hyacinth.

Anemone is worried because she has just sent Hyacinth to kill Prince Amaryllis, but the Princess is not concerned because: "nobody could possibly be strong enough to kill my Prince, and as for Hyacinth, he will be quite safe, for Prince Amaryllis is much too nice to hurt anyone”. The Princess is proven to be right as the two princes arrive arm in arm. When the Witch arrives (who is also the old woman that the little Princess met in the field) she is furious, but she is soon calmed by the little princess’ manner and everyone ends up with what they want. The witch retires to be a “nice old lady” and Prince Amaryllis and Princess Gentianella return to their gardens where they knock down the wall and turn it into one garden.

== Character descriptions ==
Princess Gentianella: Princess Gentianella is as small, fair, lovely, and as kind as a princess can be. She is so lovely that the whole world loves her and the sun and the fairies helped to make her flowers grow. She is curious and expects big things from the world. She is not afraid the save herself (rather than depending on a prince). She falls in love with Prince Amaryllis

Prince Amaryllis: A forgetful prince who cannot grow flowers, but who is strong and kind. He falls in love with Princess Gentianella.

Princess Anemone: The beautiful daughter of the Witch who is fed up with her mother's experiments. She wants her mother to stop controlling her life and using her for experiments. She falls in love with Prince Hyacinth.

Prince Hyacinth: The youngest of Gentianella's three older brothers. He falls in love with Princess Anemone.

The Witch/the Old Woman: The Witch is always doing experiments and everyone fears her. She has a temper, but likes being thought of as a nice old woman. She is warmed by Princess Gentianella's kindness and retires from being a mean witch.

The King and Queen: The King and Queen think that they are protecting Princess Gentianella from the evils of the world by building the wall around her garden but in truth they do not really understand her (although the Queen does a slightly better job at understanding the Princess than the King).

== Re-occurring themes ==
Evelyn Sharp's characters are named after flowers

Gentianella

Hyacinth

Amaryllis

Anemone

She often talks of nature and gardens in her stories (see The Lady Daffodilia)

== Literary devices and common fairy tale elements ==
- Magic
- Anthropomorphic animals
- Sarcasm and satire: I am very glad you can see me," he added politely; "one gets a little tired sometimes of being heard and not seen."..."When I was a little girl,~ said Princess Gentianella, drawing herself up to her full height, " I was always taught to be seen and not heard. That was very dull, too.".
- Glorification of human strengths i.e. kindness
- Monsters i.e. sea serpent
- Quests
- Royalty
- Good and evil characters
- Repetition
