= The Tears of Princess Prunella =

Short story belonging to collection The Other Side of the Sun

"The Tears of Princess Prunella" is a short story belonging to the collection The Other Side of the Sun, written by Evelyn Sharp. Other stories included in this collection are The Weird Witch of the Willowherb, Somebody Else's Prince, The Lady Daffodilia, The Palace on the Floor and The Kite That Went to the Moon.

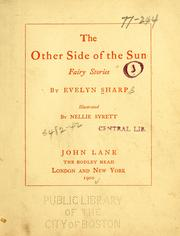
The cover of The Other Side of the Sun.

== Summary ==
Princess Prunella, who would have been considered the most beautiful and charming girl on either side of the sun if she wasn't so cross and discontent, lives in a palace with her parents, the King and Queen of Fairyland. While the King is exhausted with having such a cross daughter who is unhappy with the repetition of life in the palace, the Princess's mother seeks to resolve her daughter's unhappiness by finding her a playfellow to cheer the Princess up. All the children of the land gather at the palace on that day next week so Princess Prunella can select a playfellow. Unfortunately, to the Queen and crowd's surprise the Princess cries that all the children seem exactly alike. The King is furious and worries the crowd's disappointment will lead to a war, when suddenly the Princess jumps to her feet, pointing to a boy she thinks has a wonderful look on his face. She orders the boy to kiss her hand but instead he runs out of the palace, infuriating the Princess who has never been disobeyed. After discovering the boys name; Deaf Robert; the Princess insists much to her parents dismay that he is to be her playfellow.

The Princess's Fairy Pony runs away with her to the Fairy Forest, which grows deeper as they travel, stopping once they arrive at a little grey house, which is set in the brightest of flower gardens. The Princess is so overjoyed when she finds Deaf Robert that she forgets her anger and instead speaks in a gentle voice and is surprised to find he can hear her. He explains, Wymps had gone to his christening and that his father, The Minstrel had wished he would be deaf to every sound that was not beautiful. After much convincing, Deaf Robert returns to the Palace with Princess Prunella to become her playfellow.

For weeks the Princess is overjoyed, until Deaf Robert grows unhappy and the wonderful look disappears from his face as he wishes to go back to the town and the forest. When the Princess pricks her finger and begins to cry, Deaf Robert is unable to hear her sobs upsetting the Princess further as she realizes he is not a "real" boy. Deaf Robert hurried back to the forest seeking advise and answers from his father to no avail. Then he meets a Wymp who tells him that the next person he meets will tell him how he can become a real boy. He then comes across a woman who informs him that he should do something brave, kind, foolish and wise and if he is not a real boy after that it would be his own fault.

Deaf Robert slays a dragon and saves a princess but does not accept the award for doing so in order to fulfill the action of braveness and kindness. Finally, after many failed attempts, he meets a Wymp who is disguised as a young girl who helps him determine that leaving his Princess was most foolish and to return to her would be most wise. Upon this realization he hurries back to the palace where Princess Prunella has once again pricked her finger, but this time he can hear her soft, sweet tears. The Princess is delighted to see Deaf Robert telling him the wonderful look had once again returned to his face, and they spent the rest of their years arguing whether or not the sounds of the town were better than the sounds of the forest as they had both discovered one another's beautiful sounds.

== Character description ==
Princess Prunella Princess Prunella is pretty, charming, accomplished and loved by all even though she is always grumpy and cross. She has grown tired of the repetition of her life in the Palace and wishes for something or someone new and exciting.

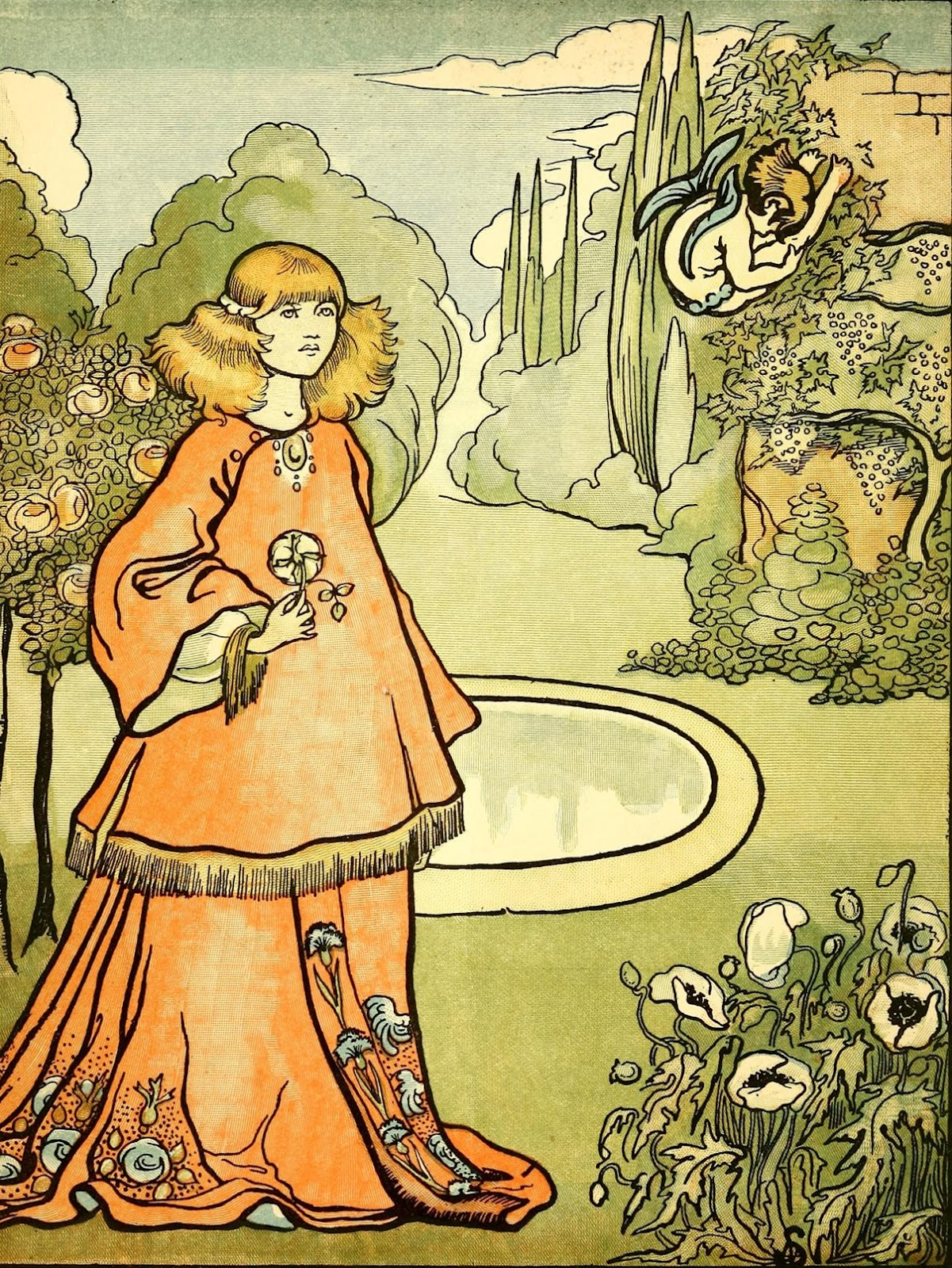
The Other Side of the Sun

Deaf Robert The son of the Minstrel, Deaf Robert can only hear what is beautiful. Deaf Robert is different from the other children of the land because of the "wonderful look on his face". When Deaf Robert cannot hear the Princess cry; because it is not considered beautiful; the Princess determines he is not a "real boy". Deaf Robert, upset by his own realization of this fact sets on a journey to become a real boy. After completing tasks of something brave, kind, foolish and wise he fulfills his wish to erase his deafness to things that are not considered beautiful, becoming a "real boy".

King of Fairyland The King has grown tired of having such a grumpy daughter. He does not understand why the Princess constantly complains as she has been given the best of everything any child could possibly want. The King defers to the Queen's judgment on the matter of their daughter worried more about the impact it may have on their kingdom than their daughter.

Queen of Fairyland The Queen, unlike her husband, aims to understand her daughter and feed her happiness trying to fulfill Princess Prunella's every request.

The Minstrel The father of Deaf Robert who, upon his sons birth, wished the Wymps give his son the ability to only hear sounds that are beautiful. The Minstrel does not understand why his son wants to hear the Princess cry as he does not considered this sound to be beautiful to him.

The Wymps The Wymps are fairy-like creatures living in the forest. They have magical powers and like to laugh and joke around.

== Fairytale elements ==
Common Fairytale Elements found in this story include:

- Fantasy and Make believe- Fairyland, Fairy pony, and an ever-growing Fairy forest.
- Royalty is present- The King and Queen of Fairyland as well as Princess Prunella
- Magical creatures - Wymps, Dragons.
- There is a problem that must be solved-Deaf Robert wants to erase the wish of his father and be able to hear all sounds of the world not only those that are beautiful.
- As in many Fairy tales there are steps that must be taken and tasks that are to be completed to resolve the problems in the story.
- There is a Happy Ending as well as a Moral.

== Themes ==
The story evokes the ever-popular themes found in most fairy tales of proving oneself brave, kind, foolish and wise. As with many fairy tales there is a moral to this story. Deaf Robert must journey off to complete a series of tasks to achieve knowledge that has been made unknown to him by magic. At the end of the journey he is rewarded for being successful and lives a supposed happily ever after. Another important theme found in The Tears of Princess Prunella, though based solely on an assumption made by readers about the Princess is her change in sentiments about what sounds are more beautiful than others. Initially she argues the sounds of the town and everyone in it are much more beautiful than the sweet sounds of nature in all its silence. Yet at the end of the story, she changes her mind agreeing with Deaf Robert's initial thoughts that the sounds of the forest and it luscious beauty are much sweeter to the ear. This leads one to assume that Princess Prunella made a change in character opening her eyes to the world in its entirety making her a much sweeter, patient Princess.
