= The Other Side of the Sun =

Victorian short story collection for children

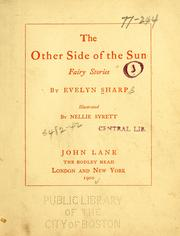
- Author: Evelyn Sharp
- OCLC: 223250999
- LC Class: PR6037.H333

The Other Side of the Sun is a collection of short stories for children written by Evelyn Sharp. It was published in 1900 by John Lane.

== Contents ==
The short stories in this book are:

- The Weird Witch of the Willow-Herb
- The Magician's Tea-Party
- The Hundredth Princess
- Somebody Else's Prince
- The Tears of Princess Prunella
- The Palace on the Floor
- The Lady Daffodilia
- The Kite That Went to the Moon

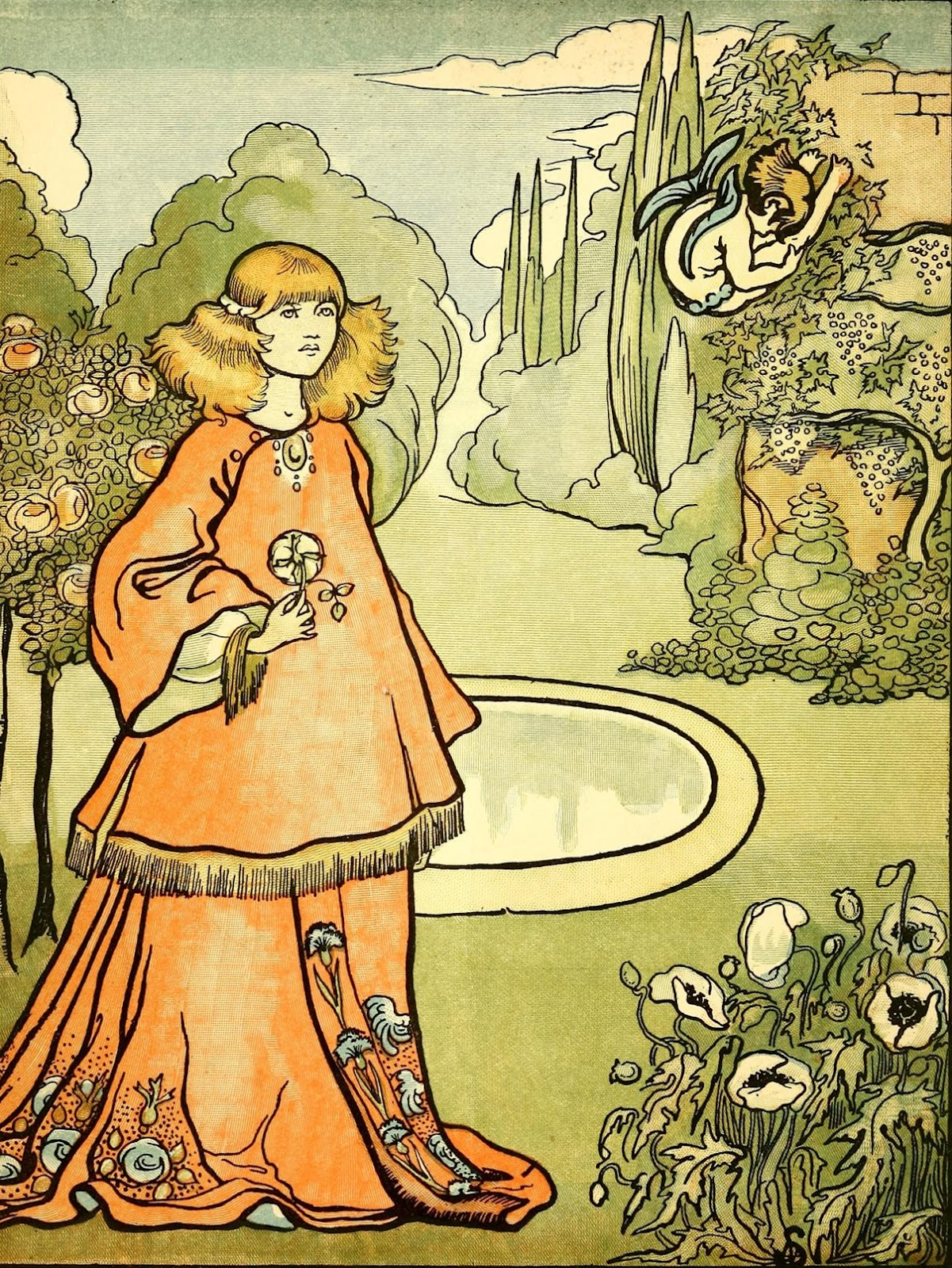
The Other Side of the Sun illustration
