= Anna Lane =

Anna Lane may refer to:

- Anna Eichberg King (died 1927), American author, married name Lane
- Anna Maria Lane (c. 1755–1810), first documented female soldier from Virginia to fight with the Continental Army in the American Revolutionary War
