= The Doll that Came Straight from Fairyland =

- Short story by Evelyn Sharp
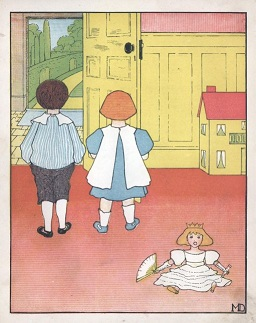
- Illustration by Mrs. Percy Dearmer
- Country: Britain
- Language: English
- Genre(s): literary fairy tale

Publication
- Published in: All the Way to Fairyland
- Publication type: Fairy tale collection
- Publisher: John Lane
- Media type: Print
- Publication date: 1898

Chronology
The Professor of Practical Jokes	Those Wymps Again!

"The Doll That Came Straight From Fairyland" is a short story for children published in 1898 by the suffragist and children's fairytale writer Evelyn Sharp. The first edition was published by John Lane in London, England, in All The Way To Fairyland with seven other short stories.

== Author biography ==
Evelyn Sharp was born in 1869 and was the ninth of eleven children. She had three years of schooling in London, where she made her living. Evelyn's first publication was an article about fairy tales which led to Wymps and other Fairy Tales (1896) and All The Way To Fairyland (1898).

She wrote for several newspapers in her lifetime and contributed to the women's suffrage movement. During this time, Sharp was imprisoned twice. Sharp actively fought the government by refusing to pay her taxes and was involved in relief committees after World War I.

Sharp married her long-time friend Henry Nevinson in 1933. They spent eight years together in Hampstead and Cotswolds until Henry died in 1941. This prompted Sharp to return to London, where she spent the remainder of her days until she died on June 17, 1955.

== Summary ==
It is Prince Perfection's 10th birthday. A Prince or Princess's 10th birthday is always celebrated with a wonderful feast and an astounding amount of gifts. Princess Pansy, who is only 8, is jealous of her brother's celebration. Everyone is invited to celebrate the Prince's birthday, including his godmother Fairy Zigzag. This particular party is very elaborate in order to acknowledge the Prince's excellent manners and uncommon perfection. The celebration stretches long into the night. The Prince's fairy godmother does not approve of his party or his personality. She shows up late and asks the Prince what he would like as a gift. The Prince contemplates a steamboat, a cannon and a magical balloon, but only replies that his godmother should give him what she thinks best. In response, Fairy Zigzag instead asks Princess Pansy what she would like. Princess Pansy asks for a fine clay doll. The Fairy Zigzag creates a magical doll straight from fairyland and then leaves the party. The Prince is left without a gift from his fairy godmother.

Princess Pansy names the doll Lady Emmelina and in the days following the party becomes bewitched by the doll. Prince Perfection gets jealous of Lady Emmelina when his sister no longer plays with him. Missing her company the Prince decides to plot revenge on the doll. During the night he sneaks into the nursery and steals the doll. Lady Emmelina screams and Prince Perfection realizes that she comes alive during the night. Taking care to cover her mouth, the Prince sneaks her out into the garden. In the garden the Prince discovers a white stone that he has never seen before. After lifting the stone Prince Perfection discovers a hole in which he hides Lady Emmelina.

The next morning the Princess is very upset when she discovers that Lady Emmelina is gone. The Prince feels guilty when he realizes his sister is now too upset to play with him. He decides to give the doll back but the white stone in the garden has disappeared! The Prince waits until night and then he sneaks back into the garden. He finds that the stone has reappeared. When he lifts the stone he does not find Lady Emmelina but instead a grasshopper. The grasshopper tells him he must go on a quest to find the doll.

The Prince gets shrunken to the grasshopper's size and steps through a door that has magically appeared. Prince Perfection must walk straight on, and when he meets other people he must ask what they are thinking. In his quest, he travels across the sea, through a gorse bush and over an iceberg to a castle. Along the way he collects thoughts. These thoughts consist of the Prince's wishes for his gift: a steamboat, a cannon and a magical balloon. The gifts that the Prince had wished for earlier help him reach the castle where Lady Emmelina is waiting. Once he finds her, the Prince quickly returns home.

When Princess Pansy sees her brother she hugs him while Lady Emmelina falls to the ground. Prince Perfection was gone for over a month. Princess Pansy no longer cares to play with the doll but instead wants to play with her brother. Although the Fairy Zigzag was most likely responsible for the Prince's adventure, the children soon forget about Lady Emmelina. The children never experience an unhappy day again.

== Character descriptions ==
Prince Perfection Not an ordinary 10-year-old-boy, Perfection is very polite and has proper manners. Everyone in the country adores him except his fairy godmother. Prince Perfection does not appreciate his sister until she no longer wants to play with him. He becomes jealous of her doll and plans to hide her in order to get back his sister's attention. When this plan fails he must go on an adventure to find her doll.

Princess Pansy Prince Perfection's younger sister is 8 years old. She loves her brother but when Fairy Zigzag gifts her a doll she no longer plays with Prince Perfection. She becomes bewitched by her doll and is very upset when the doll goes missing. Once her brother returns from finding the doll she realizes how much she missed him and the siblings play together.

Lady Emmelina The doll that Fairy Zigzag gives to Princess Pansy. Lady Emmelina is magical and comes from Fairyland. At night the doll can talk and move but after sunrise she loses her powers and becomes an ordinary doll again.

The grasshopper A shape-changing spy from Fairyland. He tells the Prince what he must do to get back the doll, and helps him do so.

Fairy Zigzag The fairy godmother dislikes the Prince and his party. Instead of giving him a gift she creates a doll for Princess Pansy. Later, Fairy Zigzag is assumed to be responsible for Prince Perfections adventure to return Lady Emmelina to Princess Pansy.
