= The Dance of Anitra =

1909 bronze statuette by Edith Maryon

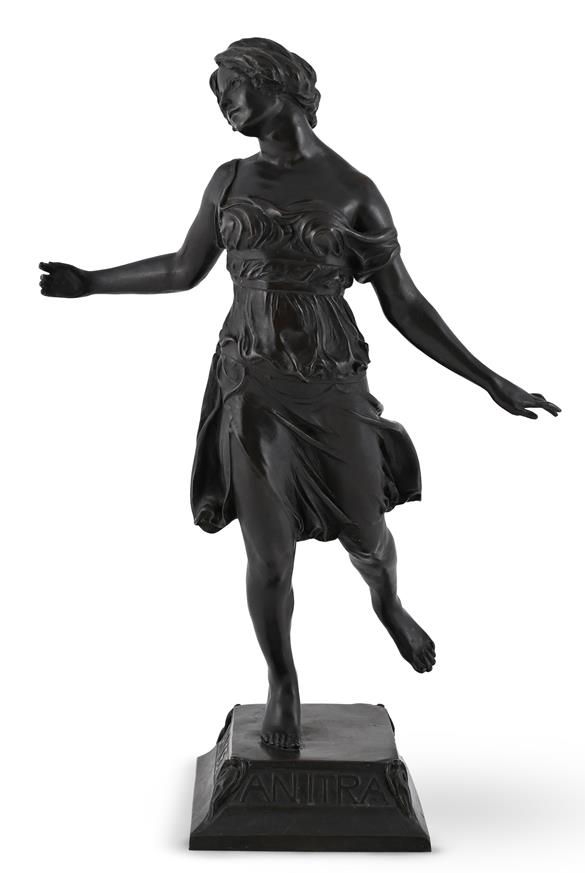
- Artist: Edith Maryon
- Year: February 1909
- Medium: Bronze
- Dimensions: 53 cm (21 in) tall; 19.5 cm × 16 cm (7.7 in × 6.3 in) wide (base)

The Dance of Anitra is a 1909 bronze statuette by the English sculptor Edith Maryon. The work depicts the Canadian dancer Maud Allan performing Anitra's Dance from Peer Gynt, an 1867 play by Henrik Ibsen for which Edvard Grieg composed incidental music. Maryon created the work at the height of Allan's fame, known as her "Conquest of London": eighteen months of shows at the Palace Theatre, during which Allan emerged as a fashion icon, sex symbol, and controversial figure.

The statuette is made of bronze and stands 53 cm (21 in) tall. It captures Allan mid-dance, emphasising her grace, movement and sensuality. The scene takes place in the fourth act of the play, which follows Peer Gynt as he is outcast from his Norwegian home and spends decades travelling abroad. While posing as a prophet to a desert tribe in Morocco, he is enraptured by the dancing of Anitra, attempts to seduce her, and is swindled out of his gold. Grieg's music accompanying the dance was later combined into two suites, which became some of his best-known works. Allan adapted the first Grieg suite, and with it Anitra's Dance, into her repertoire in February 1909, the same month that Maryon made the sculpture.

The Dance of Anitra is representative of Maryon's oeuvre from the middle of her career, which combined classical technique with deeper spiritual or philosophical ideas, and belongs to a category of her works pairing emotional and spiritual aspects. It is one of two sculptures by Maryon depicting Allan, both made around the same time. It also presages Maryon's work on eurythmy figures a decade later, after she joined the anthroposophy movement and became a close collaborator of Rudolf Steiner. Like The Dance of Anitra, these translated the grace and lightness of dance into the sculptural form.

The work was exhibited at the Royal Academy of Arts in the summer of 1909, and at the Walker Art Gallery in the autumn of 1910. Reviewers at the time praised the work for its charm and grace; one wrote that Maryon had "overcome the difficulty of pourtraying the poetry of motion". It was auctioned in 2025, attributed to a private collection in Wiltshire. The auction house noted it as one of the few works by Maryon known to survive in private hands.

== Background ==
=== Edith Maryon ===
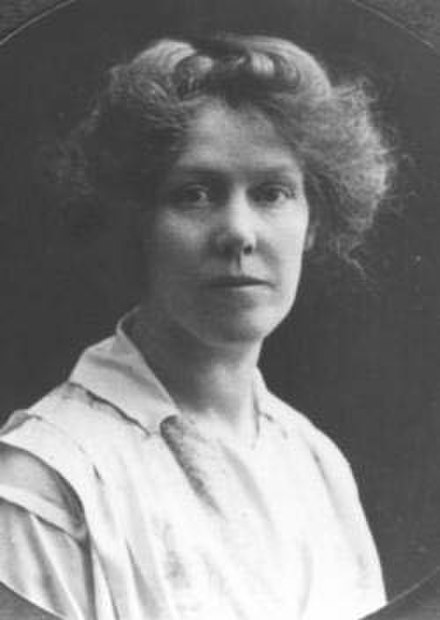
Edith Maryon

Edith Maryon was born in London on 9 February 1872. She was educated both there and in Geneva; upon her return she studied art, including at the Royal College of Art. Between 1899 and 1912, she exhibited numerous works, particularly at the Royal Academy of Arts and the Walker Art Gallery; with the former exhibition held during the summer and the latter in the autumn, many of her works were exhibited at both. These works, according to her biographer Rex Raab, tended to fall into five categories: first, the world of external physical being; second, references to the elemental world; third, motifs reflecting the human soul; fourth, allegorical works representing spiritual forces and beings; and fifth, a combination of emotional and spiritual aspects.

Maryon was interested in the esoteric at least as early as 1909, and in 1914 moved to Dornach to join the anthroposophical movement led by Rudolf Steiner. Over the next decade, until her death in 1924, Maryon became a close collaborator of Steiner; among other contributions while there, she was heavily involved in creating both the monumental sculpture The Representative of Humanity, and the eurythmy figures depicting an anthroposophical form of dance.

=== Peer Gynt ===
Anitra's Dance takes place in Act IV of Henrik Ibsen's 1867 play Peer Gynt. The five-act play chronicles the journey of its titular character from the Norwegian mountains to far-flung places including the North African desert and Panama, before returning. Edvard Grieg composed extensive incidental music for the play, including a movement to accompany the dance.

==== Play ====
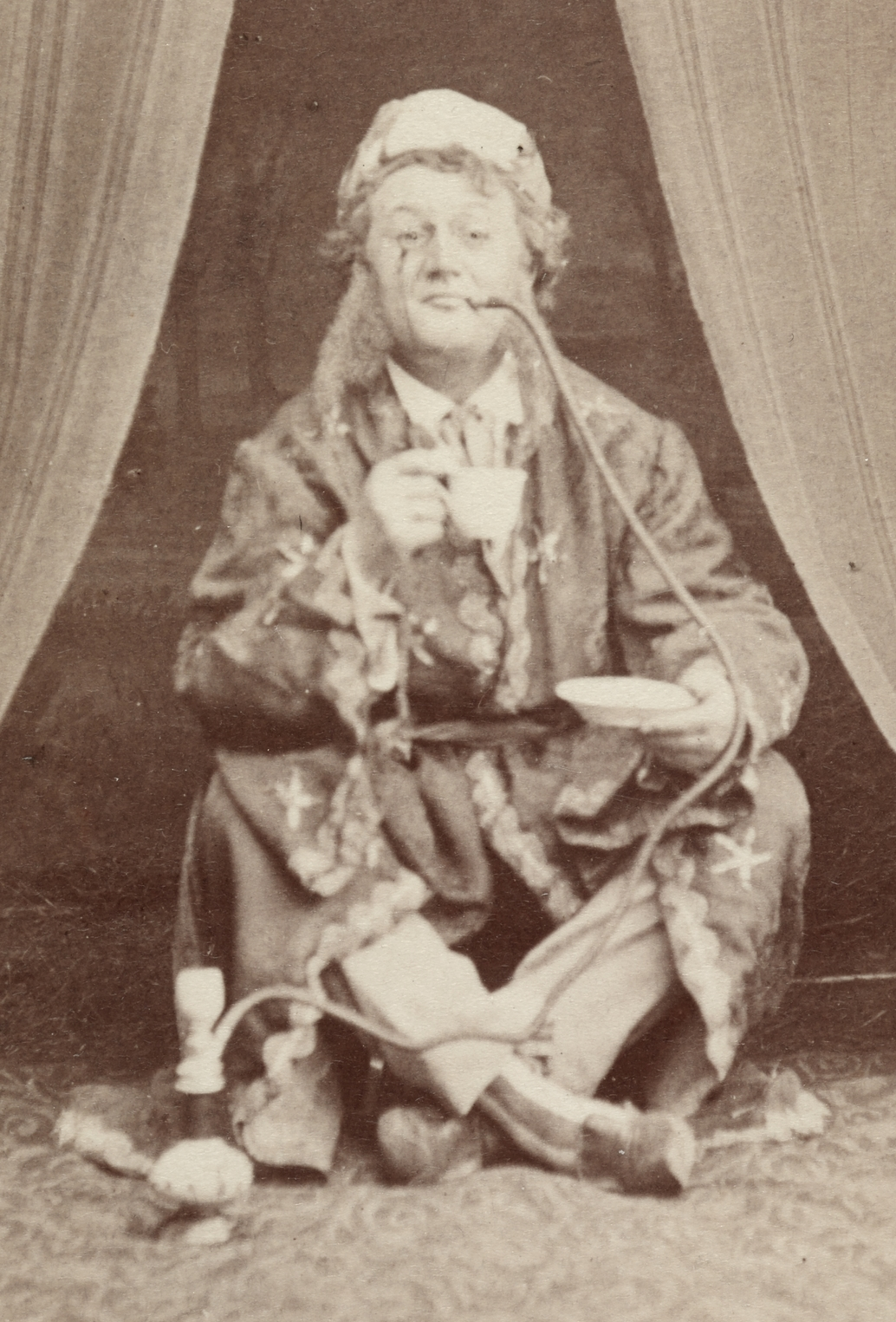
Henrik Klausen as Peer Gynt in 1876, likely while watching Anitra dance (Note: The scene matches the stage directions for this portion of Act IV, which state "The tent of an Arab Sheik, standing alone in an oasis. Peer Gynt, in his eastern robes, reclines on cushions. He is drinking coffee and smoking a long pipe. Anitra and a group of Girls are dancing and singing for him.")

The first three acts of Peer Gynt trace his transformation from liar and layabout to outcast. After running away with Ingrid, an engaged heiress who prefers him, he spurns her entreaties the next morning, saying he was merely "hot for a girl". The parish forms a mob to set out and kill Peer, who declares that he shall set out "To the sea" and "further still".

Act IV opens years later, with Peer a handsome and wealthy middle-aged gentleman. He is eating dinner by the south-west coast of Morocco, and regales four travel companions, taken aboard his steam yacht in Gibraltar, with his life's story: In his telling, he was betrothed to a woman "of royal blood", but objected to her father's request that he take a title in order to marry her. He left, he says, then made his fortune trading slaves to the Carolinas, and heathen images to China. Peer's companions set about to rob him and commandeer his yacht. Gold and yacht gone, Peer heads into the desert, where he discovers a richly caparisoned horse, jewels, and sacred robes, that had been stolen from a Moorish emperor and then abandoned.

Newly adorned in imperial regalia, Peer is taken as a prophet by a desert tribe. As he sits in a tent, girls dance in his honour and sing his praises; Anitra is among them, and approaches him afterwards. Peer commands her and the others to dance for him, in what becomes Anitra's Dance: "Dance for me, women! The prophet wants to forget the past." Peer is enamoured with Anitra, offering a monologue on her looks, and attempts to seduce her. She, in turn, persuades him to gift his jewels to her. When Peer attempts to ride away with her on his horse, she persuades him to dismount and lead the horse, then hand her his "heavy bag" of gold to save him the effort of carrying it—then gallops back to her oasis. The act closes with Peer assessing his life and options, deciding to go forward as a historian, and heading to Egypt.

==== Music ====
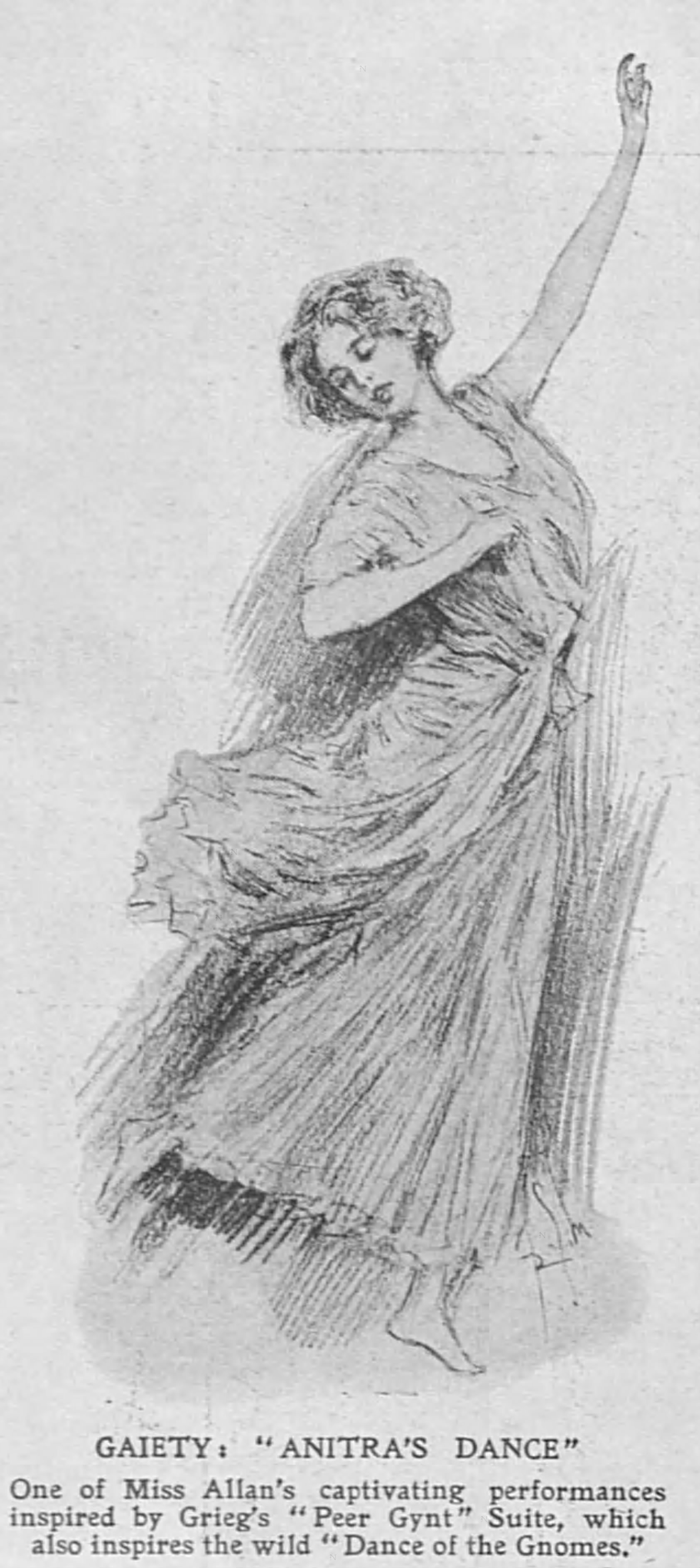
27 February 1909 sketch, probably by Richard George Mathews, of Allan performing Anitra's Dance

Though published in 1867, Peer Gynt was not performed until 1876; it was then put on in an abridged form, with musical passages substituted for certain scenes. Ibsen originally conceived of replacing Act IV with "a tone-poem which would indicate the content and would be accompanied by a few living pictures or tableaux presenting the most appropriate situations in the Act which had been omitted, e.g. Peer Gynt and the Arab girls". He was ultimately persuaded to simply make cuts to the dialogue, although some further productions contained additional cuts, including to Act IV. Grieg's original score included around two dozen movements. He wrote Anitra's Dance to be performed as Anitra and the other girls dance, "conceived as an accompaniment to Peer Gynt's monologue ... played behind the scene pianissimo".

Anitra's Dance

Grieg's music for Anitra's Dance included parts for violins, viola, cello, double bass, and triangle. Writing in a 1910 biography of Grieg, Henry Theophilus Finck wrote that "In Anitra's Dance there are wondrous bars ... which seem to contain the quintessence of all that is blissful and ecstatic in love — the 'voluptuous mystery' of the East. The music is European in its rhythms and exquisite melodies, yet by some strange magic of genius Grieg seems to give it the very atmosphere of the tent in the wilds of Morocco where the Arab girl enchants Peer Gynt with her beauty and her graceful movements."

Grieg's music for Peer Gynt had a legacy outlasting the play. He created two suites from eight of the movements, with Anitra's Dance included in the first. The suites quickly became popular, being performed by orchestras worldwide; they are still among Grieg's best-known works, alongside his Piano Concerto.

=== Maud Allan ===
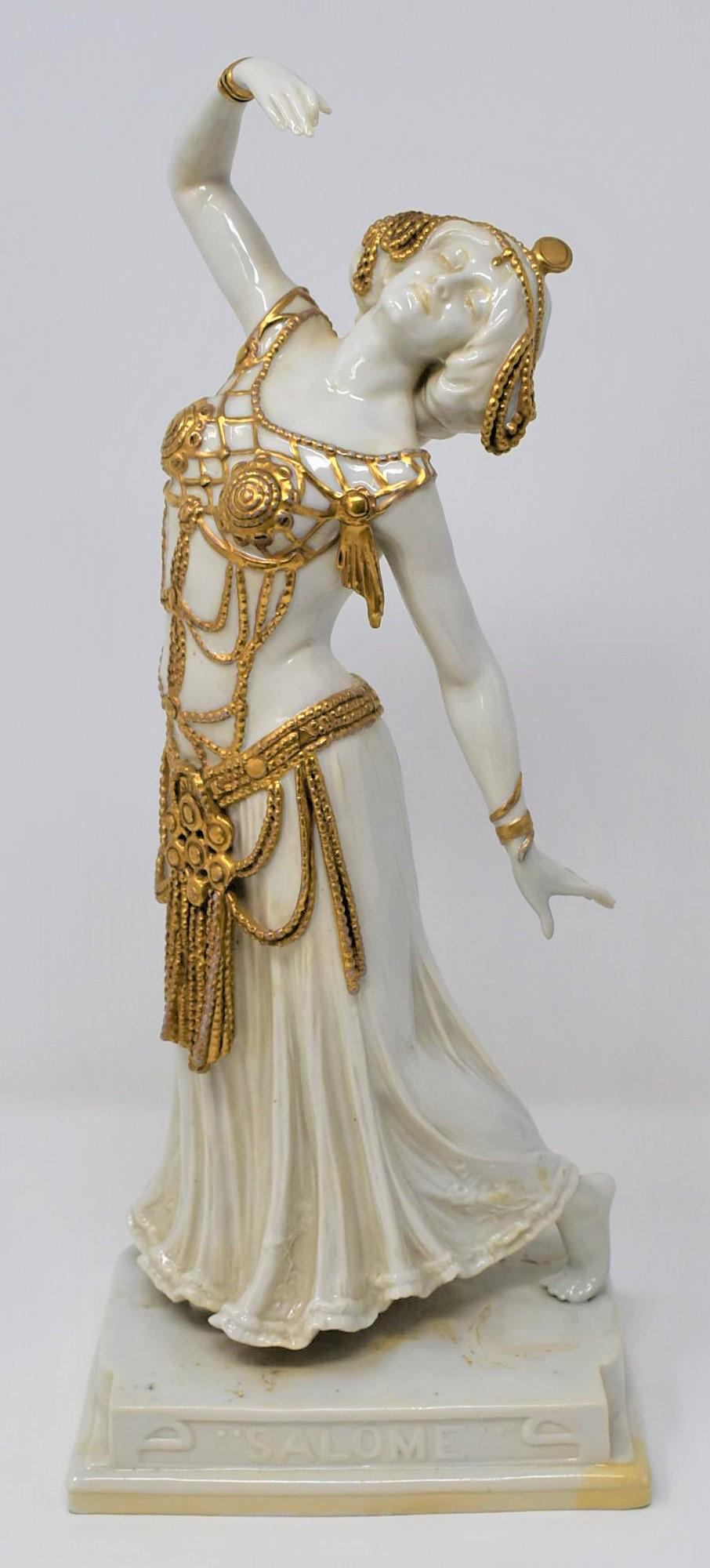
Mass-market porcelain of Allan as Salome, likely c. 1908–1909

Maud Allan rose to fame as a dancer around 1906, with her Vienna debut of The Vision of Salome. The dance, performed to music by Marcel Remy, was a rendition of Salome's Dance of the Seven Veils before the beheading of John the Baptist. The performances were both successful and controversial—the latter helping to feed the former—in no small part due to the fact that Allan's costume only minimally covered her breasts.

Allan's break came when she was invited to dance before King Edward VII in September 1907. The performance facilitated an introduction to Alfred Butt, the managing director and chairman of London's Palace Theatre, which in turn facilitated a two-week residency there. Allan was an overnight success; two weeks became eighteen months. At the height of her "Conquest of London", as it was known, she broke box-office records, made £250 (equivalent to £35,000 in 2024 (Note: United Kingdom Gross Domestic Product deflator figures follow the MeasuringWorth "consistent series" supplied in Thomas, Ryland; Williamson, Samuel H. (2026). "What Was the U.K. GDP Then?". MeasuringWorth.)) a week from the Palace, and commanded the same price for her many private recitals. She was at ease with and embraced by society, became both a fashion icon and a sex symbol, and contributed to an outbreak of "Salomania". Her private life, including rumoured affairs with the Second Duke of Westminster and the Prime Minister's wife Margot Asquith, also became the subject of much gossip, inspiring two romans à clef: Salome and the Head, by E. Nesbit, and the anonymous and pornographic Maudie.

Another product of Allan's fame was the proliferation of flower-pot statuettes of her sold at the gift shops along Bond Street. Many of these were made in porcelain by German manufacturers, such as Kister and Galluba & Hofmann. They tended to depict her most striking poses of her most famous role, Salome, and often mirrored the poses seen on photographic postcards of Allan.

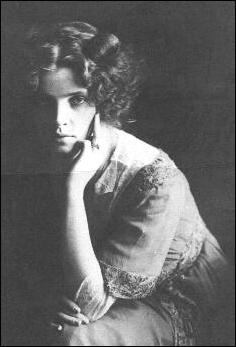
Maud Allan

In October 1908, Allan performed for her 250th time at the Palace and—possibly due to exhaustion—suffered a bad fall on stage. She returned to the stage on 12 February 1909, introducing new dances to her set. These included the first Peer Gynt suite, and with it Anitra's Dance. Newspapers at the time variously stated that "Anitra's dance [was] wonderfully captivating" (The Daily Telegraph); "'Anitra's Dance' was the most charming of the [Peer Gynt] sections" (The Times); "the grace and vivacity of Anitra's dance were charming, but they were not in harmony with the Eastern colour of the music" (The Manchester Guardian); and "Anitra's Dance is delicious, the very spirit of girlish joy" (The Toronto Daily Star). Allan's run at the Palace finally ended in mid-November 1909.

== Description ==
One cast of The Dance of Anitra is known, although additional casts may also have been made. The statuette is made of bronze, stands 53 cm (21 in) tall, and measures 19.5 cm × 16 cm (7.7 in × 6.3 in) at the base. The words "Dance of Anitra" and "Maud Allan" are both spelt out in capital letters in relief on the sides of the base, which is signed by Maryon and inscribed "Feb 1909". (Note: The sculpture itself does not include the word "The" before "Dance of Anitra". The catalogue for the Fortieth Autumn Exhibition at the Walker Art Gallery, where the sculpture was displayed in 1910, gives the title as The Dance of Anitra. The catalogue for the Royal Academy of Arts exhibition, where the sculpture was displayed the year before, describes the sculpture as "Miss Maud Allan, in the 'Dance of Anitra'".)

The work depicts Allan in the midst of performing Anitra's Dance from Peer Gynt. According to the auction house Dreweatts, "The depiction of Maud Allan in this bronze captures the dancer's charisma, mysticism, movement and sensual stage presence as she performs the seductive dance which emphasises the grace and beauty of Anitra". By the time it was auctioned in 2025, Dreweatts noted that the sculpture appeared untouched in natural light but showed a patina and some wear around the extremities, such as the fingers, shoulders and base. Dreweatts said that the sculpture had accumulated slight dirt and could use a light cleaning.

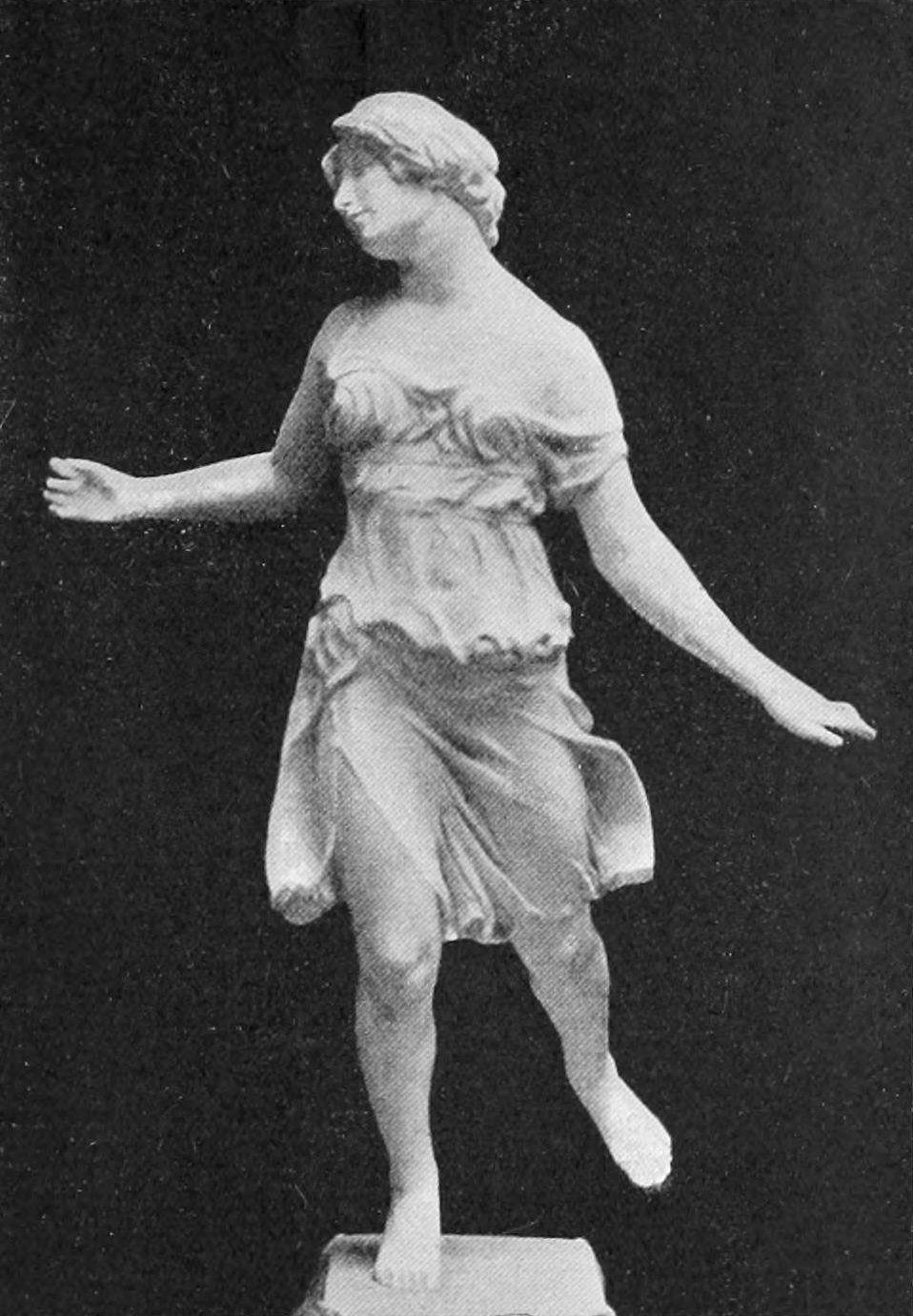
As photographed in The Studio and The International Studio in 1911

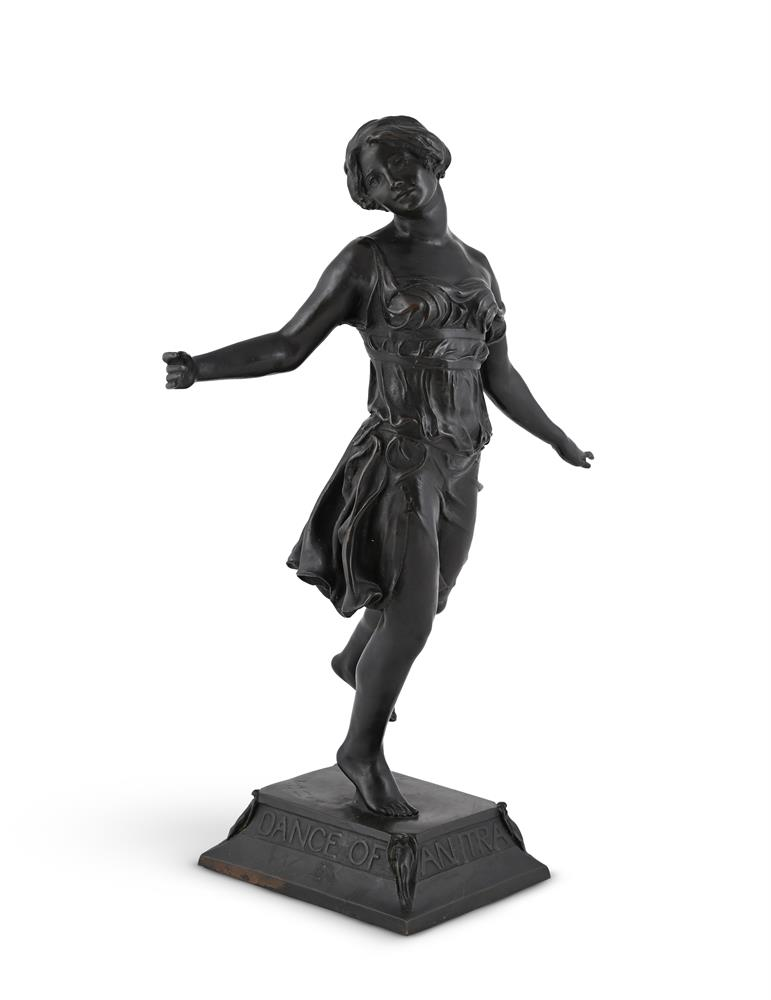
Front/right

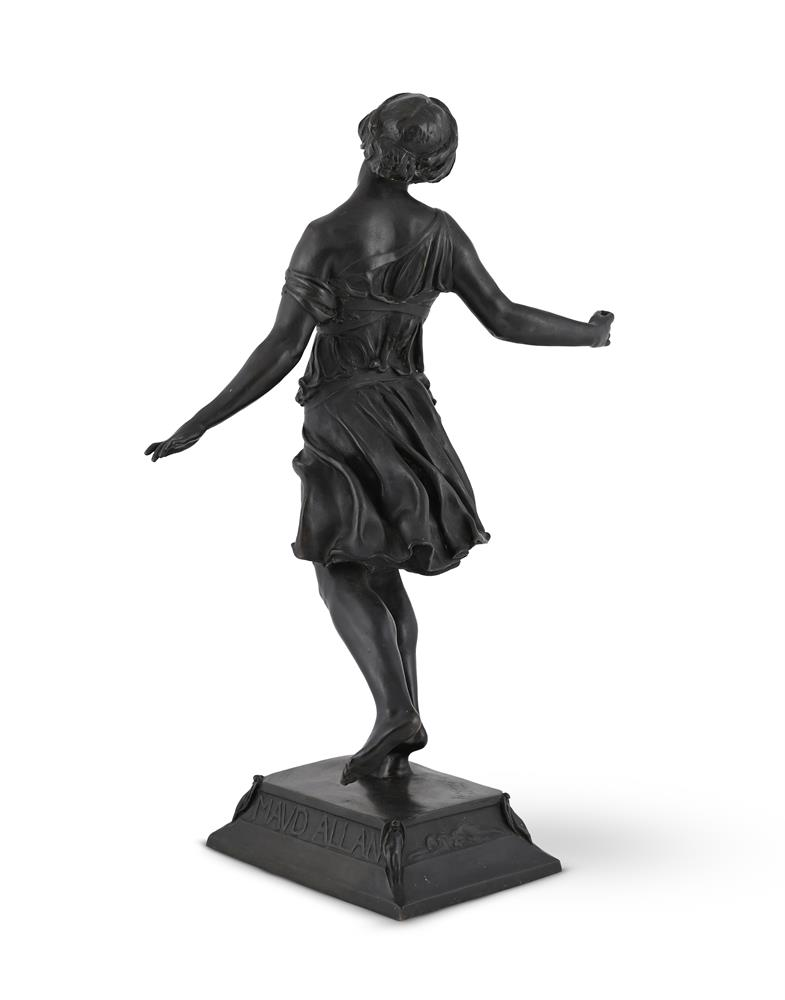
Rear/left

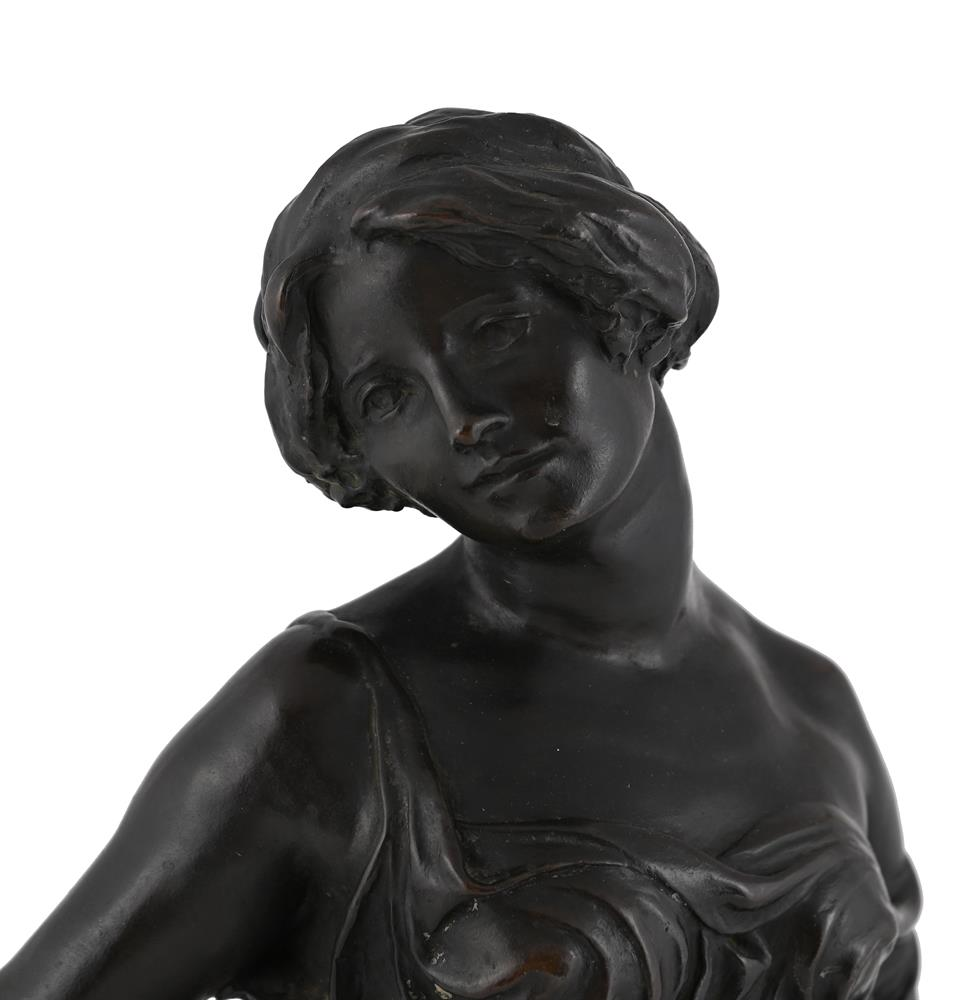
Head

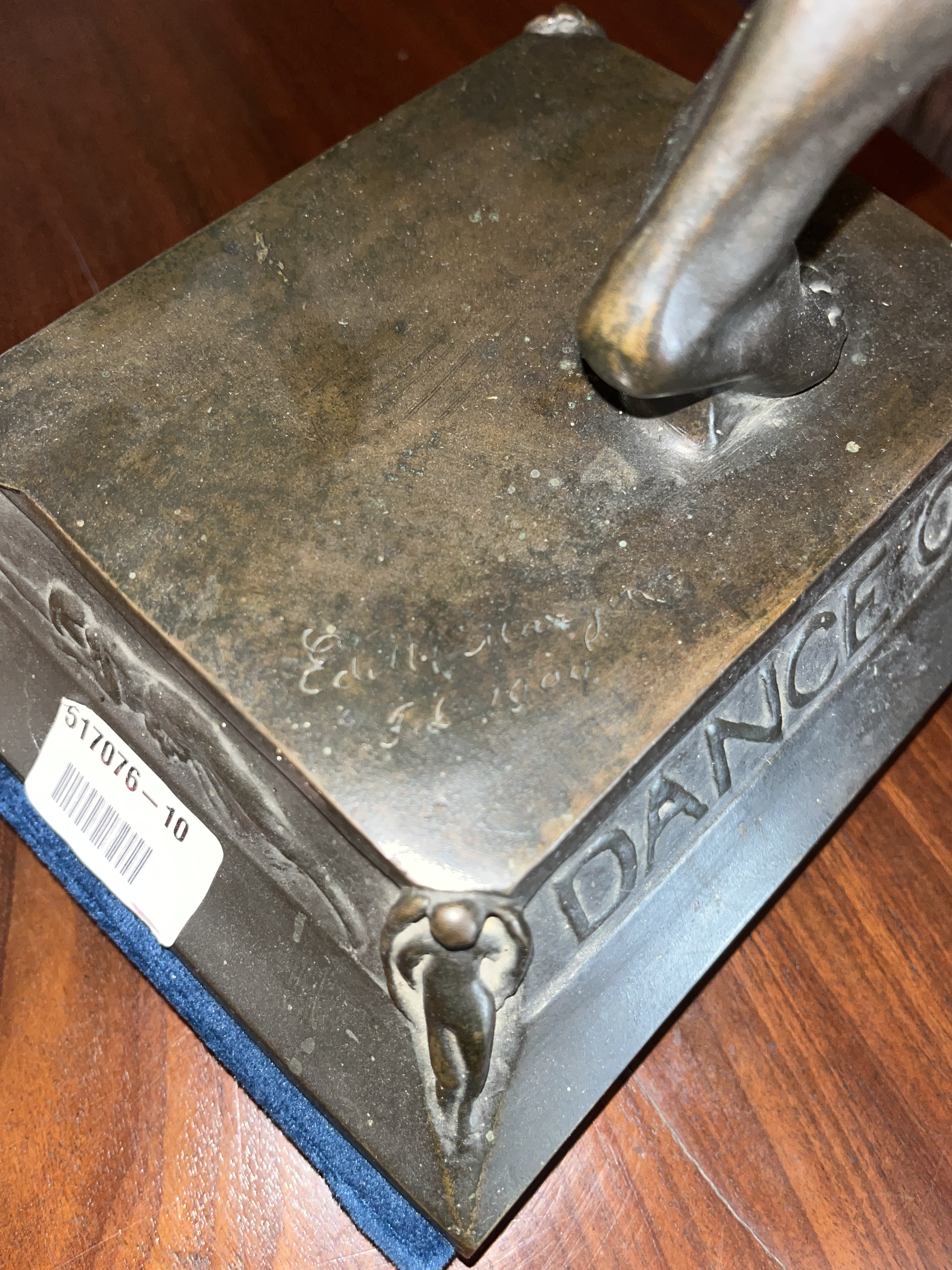
Signature/date

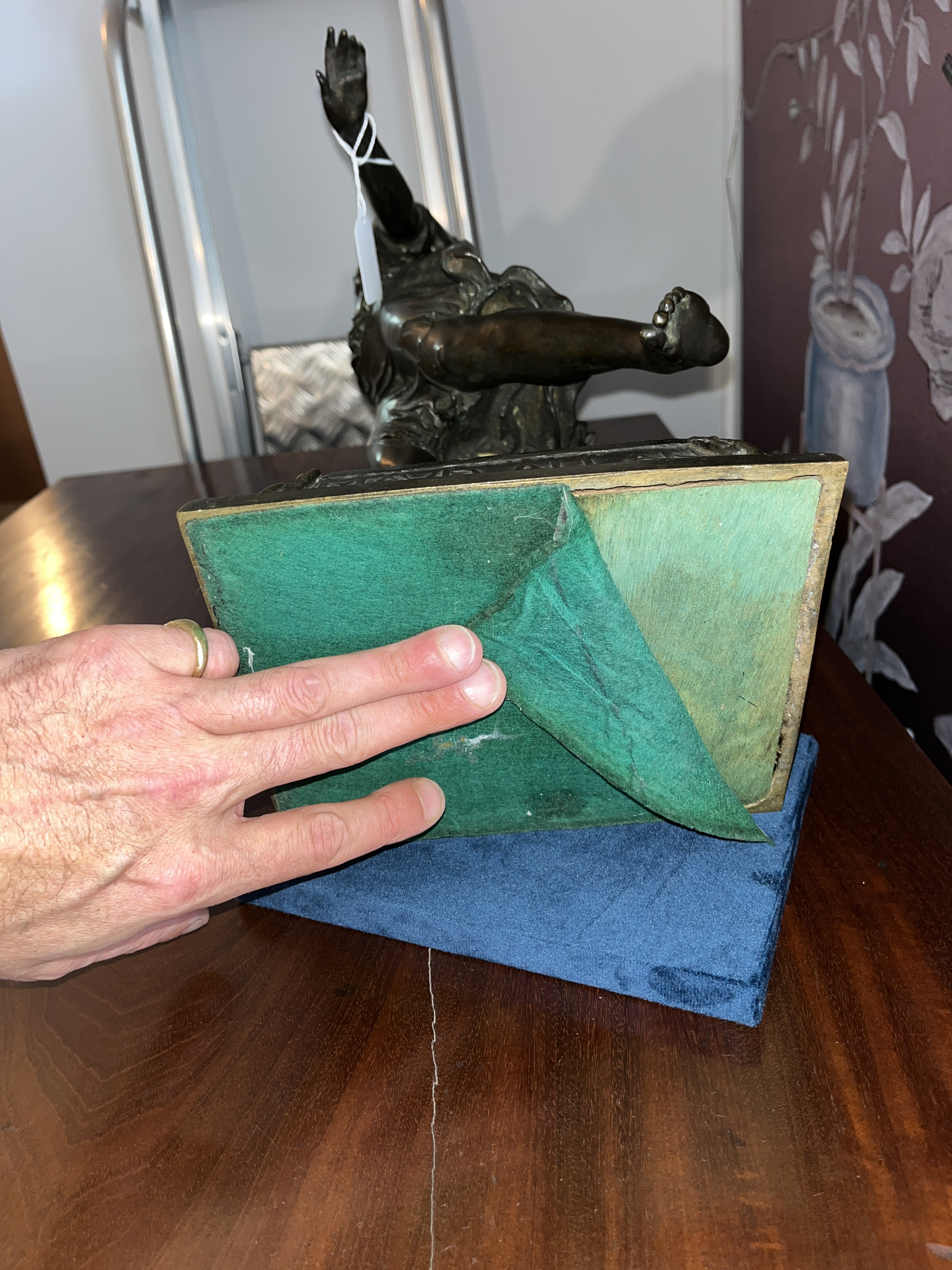
Base

== Themes ==
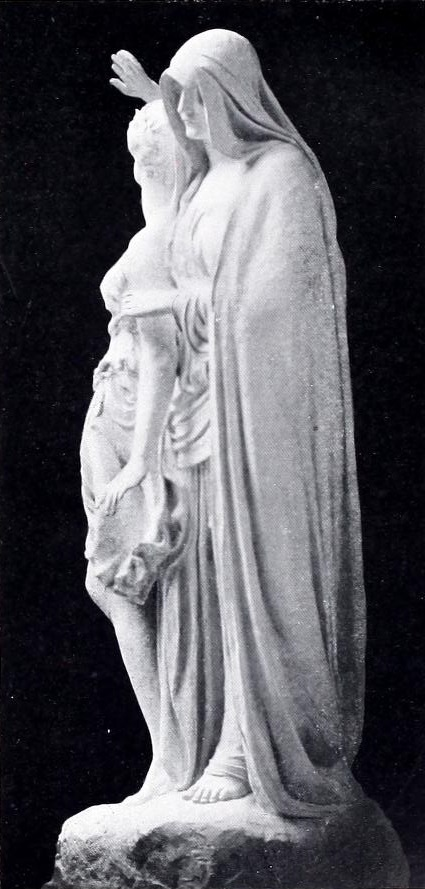
Maryon's The Passing of Winter—Miss Maud Allan as Spring (c. 1909)

According to Raab, The Dance of Anitra represents a fifth-category work by Maryon, combining emotional and spiritual aspects. Another example is Maryon's 1911 work Priestess of Isis. To Dreweatts, it represents Maryon's "distinctive sculptural style that combined classical technique with symbolic expression".

The sculpture is one of two works by Maryon depicting Maud Allan. The other, titled The Passing of Winter—Miss Maud Allan as Spring, was made around the same time and was perhaps at a larger scale than The Dance of Anitra; it was pictured in Academy Architecture in 1909, and exhibited at the Forty-first Autumn Exhibition at the Walker Art Gallery from 23 September 1911 to 6 January 1912, priced at £200 (equivalent to £28,000 in 2024). According to Dreweatts, "While there is little documentary evidence of their personal relationship, this intimate rendering indicates there was a close relationship or at the very least an understanding between the two women whilst simultaneously allowing an insight into the interplay of performance, presence and visual arts in early 20th century Britain."

The Dance of Anitra presages Maryon's later eurythmy figures created for the Anthroposophy movement. These originated in a relief created by Maryon, perhaps in early 1919, that depicts Ilona Schubert performing a eurythmy solo to Goethe's poem Die Spröde. This work is thematically similar to The Dance of Anitra, displaying what Raab terms the "grace and lightness" (German: Grazie und Leichtigkeit) of the dancer. It prompted Maryon to look for ways to represent eurythmy gestures in art; she undertook these efforts from 1919 until early 1922 in collaboration with Steiner, beginning with three-dimensional models and eventually settling on two-dimensional wooden designs.

== Provenance ==
=== Royal Academy of Arts ===
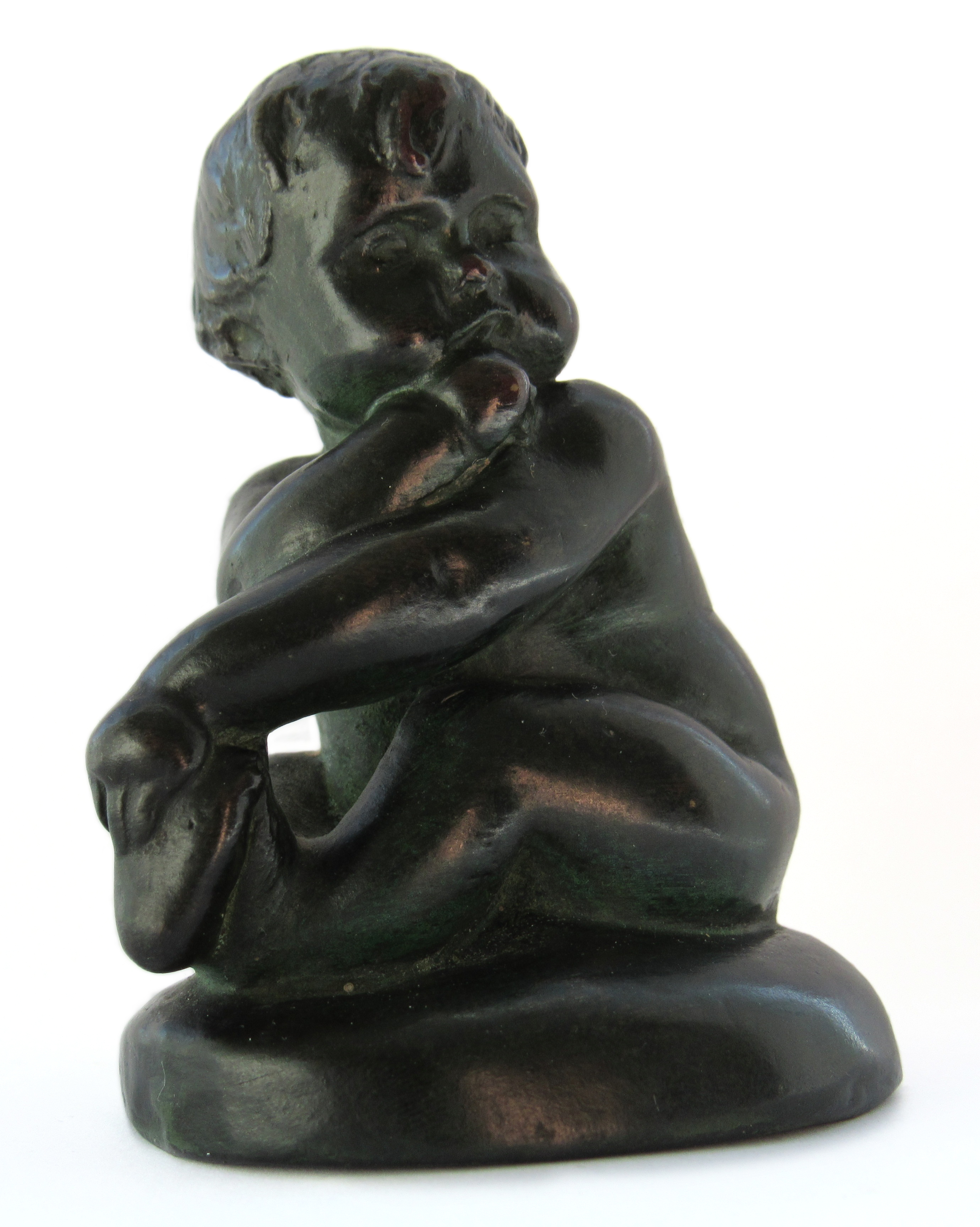
Meditation (1910), a small bronze by Maryon exhibited alongside The Dance of Anitra

Maryon created The Dance of Anitra in February 1909, the same month that Allan returned to the stage after her fall and began performing Anitra's Dance. She displayed the sculpture at the 141st Exhibition of the Royal Academy of Arts that year, held at Burlington House in London from 3 May to 2 August. Maryon displayed no other works at this exhibition. The Era called the work "graceful" and highlighted it along with ten other celebrity portraits in an article on 8 May, terming the exhibition "an Academy, broadly speaking, of landscapes and men's portraits"; other such works included a portrait of Charles Santley by John Henry Frederick Bacon, and a bust of William Terriss by Albert Toft.

In an article on female artists represented at the Academy, The Gentlewoman also highlighted The Dance of Anitra, along with eight other sculptures. The article described the work as "of high merit". Other sculptures the review highlighted included a marble bust by Margaret Wrightson, Isis by Frances Darlington, and a statuette of Ernest Troubridge by his wife Una Vincenzo.

Another column discussing the Royal Academy exhibition was published in the Acton Gazette and Middlesex County Times. It discussed 22 works from the exhibition, including Maryon's, and wrote that in The Dance of Anitra she had "overcome the difficulty of pourtraying the poetry of motion". The comment echoed a phrase commonly used in reference to Allan; a February 1909 article in The Graphic stated that "Everyone who cannot think of anything else to say talks about the poetry of motion in connection with Miss Allan; and there is some excuse for the hackneyed phrase." Amongst the other works highlighted by the column were A Favourite Custom by Lawrence Alma-Tadema (now in Tate Britain), Ulysses and the Sirens by Herbert James Draper (now in Ferens Art Gallery), and The New Voice by Byam Shaw. The Jewelers' Circular also mentioned The Dance of Anitra, writing that "The most striking pieces" at the exhibition "are to be found in the sculpture room", and Lloyd's Weekly News noted the sculpture in an article highlighting the works by women in the show.

=== Walker Art Gallery ===
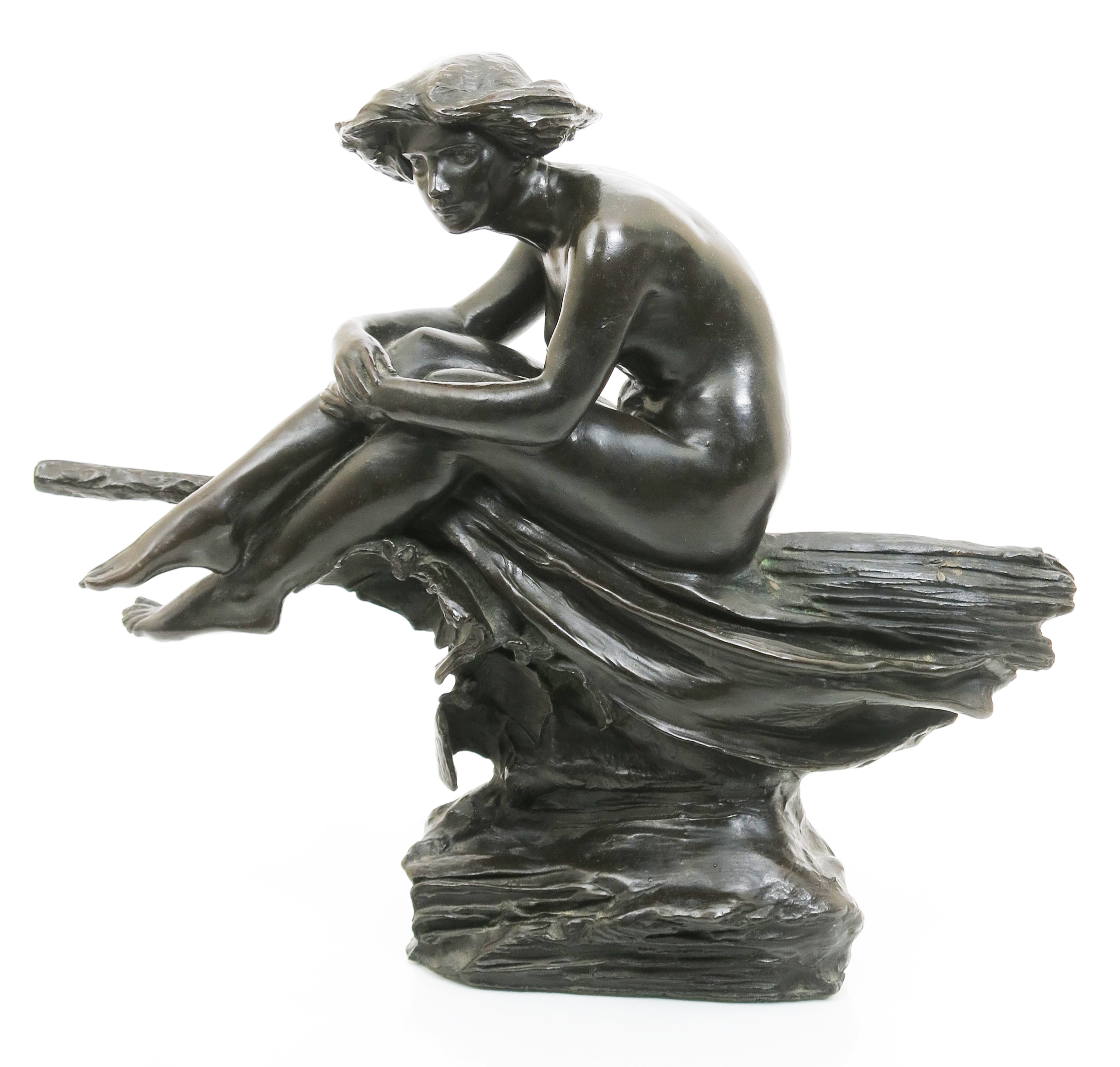
Maryon's To the Witches' Revels (1909), exhibited alongside The Dance of Anitra

The following year, in 1910, Maryon displayed the statuette at the Fortieth Autumn Exhibition at the Walker Art Gallery in Liverpool from 19 September 1910 to 7 January 1911. It was priced at £12 12s (equivalent to £1,800 in 2024), but did not sell.

The Studio and its American counterpart The International Studio published a photograph of the statuette, with Henry Bloomfield Bare calling it a work "of charm and interest". The Dance of Anitra was one of three works depicted; the others were The Langdale Pikes, Westmorland by Robert Gwelo Goodman and The Balloon by Mary Gow, both of which were purchased by the Walker. Maryon also displayed four other works at the exhibition: Fairy Luck, Meditation, To the Witches' Revels, and Miss Ruth Franklin.

=== Auction ===
On 11 September 2025, the statuette was sold by Dreweatts, as lot 500 in its two-day auction Fine Furniture: Sculpture, Carpets, Ceramics & Works of Art. At the time, the work was attributed to a private collection in Wiltshire. The auction house noted it as one of the few works by Maryon known to survive in private hands, stating that such works appeared to be "extremely rare"; other such works include Meditation, To the Witches' Revels, and Psyche. The Dance of Anitra sold for £4,200, against an estimate of £2,000–3,000, in addition to a 27% buyer's premium.

== Bibliography ==
- "Art Notes". Acton Gazette. Ealing. 14 May 1909. p. 5 – via Newspapers.com.
- "Art Notes". Middlesex County Times. Vol. XLVI, no. 2, 397. Middlesex. 15 May 1909. p. 5 – via Newspapers.com.
- Autumn Catalogue Sale. Leyburn, North Yorkshire: Tennants. 2004. OCLC 1552801646.
- Bare, Henry Bloomfield (January 1911a). "Studio Talk: Liverpool". The Studio. LI (214): 231–232.
- Bare, Henry Bloomfield (January 1911b). "Studio Talk: Liverpool". The International Studio. XVII (167): 231–232.
- "The Balloon". National Museums Liverpool. 30 May 2018. Archived from the original on 26 April 2026.
- Cherniavsky, Felix (1991). The Salome Dancer: The Life and Times of Maud Allan. Toronto: McClelland & Stewart Inc. ISBN 0-7710-1957-2.
- Cherniavsky, Felix (1998). Maud Allan and Her Art. Toronto: Dance Collection Danse Press. ISBN 0-929003-35-7.
- "The Craft of Dancing". The Graphic. Vol. LXXXIX, no. 2, 048. London. 27 February 1909. p. 270 – via Newspapers.com.
- "E Maryon: A Bronze Figure of a Standing Nude Young Woman, 1909". The Saleroom. 24 November 2004. Archived from the original on 30 April 2024.
- The Exhibition of the Royal Academy of Arts. Vol. 141. London: Royal Academy of Arts. 1909.
- Finck, Henry T. (1910). Grieg and his Music. New York: John Lane Company.
- Fine Furniture, Sculpture, Carpets, Ceramics & Works of Art. Newbury: Dreweatts. 2025. OCLC 1533462166.

- The Dance of Anitra lot published online with revisions as "Edith Maryon (1872–1924), A Bronze Figure of Maud Allan- Dance of Anitra, Dated 1909". Dreweatts. 11 September 2025. Archived from the original on 11 September 2025.

- Fortieth Autumn Exhibition of Modern Art: Catalogue (7th ed.). Liverpool: Corporation of Liverpool, Walker Art Gallery. 1910. OCLC 22433402.
- Forty-first Autumn Exhibition of Modern Art: Catalogue (8th ed.). Liverpool: Corporation of Liverpool, Walker Art Gallery. 1911. OCLC 22433402.
- Halvorsen, Johan, ed. (1908). Peer Gynt. Leipzig: C. F. Peters.
- Ibsen, Henrik (1972). "Peer Gynt". In McFarlane, James Walter (ed.). The Oxford Ibsen. Vol. III. Translated by Kirkup, James; Fry, Christopher & Fillinger, Johan. London: Oxford University Press. pp. 251–421. ISBN 0-19-211360-7.
- Horton, John (April 1945). "Ibsen, Grieg and 'Peer Gynt'". Music & Letters. XXVI (2): 231–232. JSTOR 727106.
- K., A. (13 February 1909). "Miss Maud Allan's Return". The Manchester Guardian. No. 19, 506. Manchester. p. 9 – via Newspapers.com.
- Koch, Alex, ed. (1909). "Sculptures". Academy Architecture. 35: 81–96.
- Koch, Alex, ed. (1912). Sculptures from "Academy Architecture," 1909–1912. London: Academy Architecture.
- "The Langdale Pikes". National Museums Liverpool. 30 May 2018. Archived from the original on 26 April 2026.
- "Louisa Edith Maryon (1872–1924)". Woolley & Wallis. 2015. Archived from the original on 5 July 2019.
- Maryon, John Ernest (1895). Records and Pedigree of the Family of Maryon of Essex and Herts. London: Self-published.
- "Maud Allan Again Captures London". The Toronto Daily Star. Vol. 17. Toronto. 6 March 1909. p. 18 – via Newspapers.com.
- "The Palace Theatre". The Times. No. 38, 882. London. 13 February 1909. p. 13 – via Newspapers.com.
- "Palace Theatre: Miss Maud Allan's Return". The Daily Telegraph. No. 16, 787. London. 13 February 1909. p. 13 – via Newspapers.com.
- "Pictures at the Royal Academy". Lloyd's Weekly News. No. 3, 467. London. 2 May 1909. p. 14.
- Raab, Rex (1993). Edith Maryon: Bildhauerin und Mitarbeiterin Rudolf Steiners [Edith Maryon: Sculptor and collaborator of Rudolf Steiner]. Pioniere der Anthroposophie (in German). Vol. XI. Dornach: Philosophisch-Anthroposophischer Verlag am Goetheanum. ISBN 3-7235-0648-8.
- "Rare Louisa Edith Church Maryon Bronze Figurine of an Infant". East Bristol Auctions. Archived from the original on 11 September 2025.
- Selg, Peter (2006). Edith Maryon: Rudolf Steiner and die Dornacher Christus-Plastik [Edith Maryon: Rudolf Steiner and the Sculpture of Christ in Dornach]. Studien zu esoterischen Schülern Rudolf Steiners (in German). Vol. 3. Dornach: Verlag am Goetheanum. ISBN 978-3-7235-1286-9.

- Translated into English as Selg, Peter (2022). Edith Maryon: Rudolf Steiner and the Sculpture of Christ in Dornach. Translated by Barton, Matthew. Forest Row: Temple Lodge Publishing. ISBN 978-1-912230-95-2.

- Shaw, Samuel (30 May 2018). "1909: George Clausen and the Woman Reading". The Royal Academy Summer Exhibition: A Chronicle, 1769–2018. Paul Mellon Centre for Studies in British Art.
- "Sir Alfred Butt: Politics, Racing and the Theatre". Obituary. The Times. No. 55, 570. London. 10 December 1962. p. 14. Archived from the original on 28 April 2026.
- St. George (9 June 1909). "Sculpture, Silverware, Medals, Etc., Exhibited at the Royal Academy of Arts, London". The Jewelers' Circular. Vol. LVIII, no. 19. New York. p. 53.
- Steiner, Rudolf (1984). Fröbose, Eva (ed.). Entwürfe zu den Eurythmiefiguren [Designs for the Eurythmy Figures]. Rudolf Steiner Gesamtausgabe (in German). Vol. K 26. Dornach: Rudolf Steiner Verlag. ISBN 3-7274-3631-X.
- Steiner, Rudolf (1990). Donat, Konrad (ed.). Rudolf Steiner / Edith Maryon: Briefwechsel [Rudolf Steiner / Edith Maryon: Correspondence] (PDF). Rudolf Steiner Gesamtausgabe (in German). Vol. 263/1. Dornach: Rudolf Steiner Verlag. ISBN 3-7274-2631-4.
- "Theatrical Gossip". The Era. Vol. 72, no. 3, 685. London. 8 May 1909. p. 16.
- Weintraub, Sharon Hope (2005). "Salomania". Bawdy Bisques and Naughty Novelties: German Bathing Beauties and Their Risqué Kin. Atglen, Pennsylvania: Schiffer Publishing. pp. 136–141. ISBN 978-0-7643-2215-0.
- "Women's Work at the Royal Academy". The Gentlewoman. Vol. 38, no. 987. London. 5 June 1909. p. 769.
