= The Hundredth Princess =

Fairy tale by Evelyn Sharp

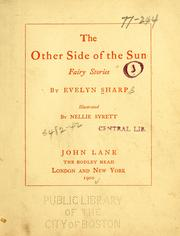
The Other Side of the Sun

"The Hundredth Princess" is a short fairy tale for children written by Evelyn Sharp. This fairy tale is among a collection of other short stories included in Evelyn Sharp's book titled The Other Side of the Sun (1900), which she wrote, published by John Lane.

== Plot summary ==
This fairy tale is about a beautiful woman who lives in the forest, the Green Enchantress, who decides to take it into her own hands to bring an end to the King’s frivolous hunting of small animals in the woods. When her attempt at putting an enchantment on the King fails, she begins to lose faith in her Enchantress abilities. Upon this discovery, she decides to give up her life as an Enchantress and live the life of a scullery maid in the King’s palace instead. She goes to see the magician named Smilax, who turns her into an ordinary girl in exchange for her powers. The King instantly becomes ‘enchanted’ by his new scullery maid's natural beauty and begins sneaking about, helping with her maid's chores and forgetting entirely about hunting in this process. After spending many long afternoons in the garden together, the King invites the Enchantress to his ball and declares her a princess, despite his staff’s suspicion of her only being a scullery maid. Ninety-nine other princesses show up to the ball and dance with the King in hopes of winning his heart, but each one pales in comparison to the Green Enchantress’ beauty. At the end of the ball, after the staff’s bickering about her true identity, the King declares the Green Enchantress his new Queen and vows to never hunt again to please his new wife.

== Author biography ==
Evelyn Sharp was a journalist and esteemed writer born in England, 1869. She was inspired to begin a career as a journalist and writer by her male companion, Henry Nevinson. She gained interest in the women’s movement after becoming aware, through her journalistic research, of the suppression of women’s rights. She was inspired to write stories about these difficulties in order to spread awareness to the general public and gain involvement of others in creating gender equality within the workforce. These stories were published in her two books of short stories, The Other Side of the Sun (1900) and All the way to Fairy Land (1898), as well as her contributions in the publication The Yellow Book.
