= The Lady Daffodilia =

- Short story by Evelyn Sharp
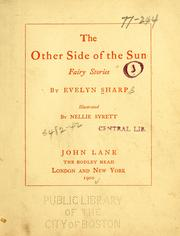
- Country: Great Britain
- Language: English
- Genre: Children's literature

Publication
- Published in: The Other Side of the Sun
- Publisher: John Lane
- Media type: Print
- Publication date: 1900
- Pages: 13

The Lady Daffodilia is a children's short story written by Evelyn Sharp and published in 1900 by John Lane. Along with other works by Evelyn Sharp, it was published in a book entitled The Other Side Of The Sun.

== Plot ==
Lady Daffodilia is a very tall 12-year-old girl because all she does is grow. She is playmates with Prince Brilliant. Prince Brilliant is very brilliant and wise but compared to Lady Daffodilia is quite short. Lady Daffodilia teases Prince Brilliant about his height. This upsets him and he decides to set out on a journey and vowing not to return until he has grown as tall as her.

Lady Daffodilia is distressed by the Prince’s absence as she is lonely without anyone to play with. She decides to become as clever as Prince Brilliant and shuts herself in the Count’s library. However, believing that she was at fault for the Prince’s absence, the local people imprison her. The prison is an old and lonely castle where Lady Daffodilia occupies her time gardening. In time, she becomes known as one of the best gardeners in the kingdom.

The prince meets a daddy-longlegs spider who tells him that with great patience he will be able to grow long legs. The daddy-longlegs instructs Prince Brilliant to jump into a hedge, where he enters into the world of dreams. Prince Brilliant spends seven years playing in the dream world before the daddy-longlegs returns to tell him that he should go back into the real world.

Prince Brilliant reunites with Lady Daffodilia and she is in awe at how tall he has become. While Lady Daffodilia admits that she was unable to become as clever as Prince Brilliant, he does not think that it matters, as she is “sweet and merry and charming.”

== Character descriptions ==
Queen-mother: Mother of Prince Brilliant; reprimands her son’s manners towards Lady Daffodilia.

Countess: advises Lady Daffodilia’s manners towards Prince Brilliant.

Daddy-longlegs: a spider who tells Prince Brilliant how to grow his legs longer.

Lady Daffodilia: 12 years old; tall. she is described as idle, careless, thoughtless, and fair. She desires to be as smart as Prince Brilliant once he goes away.

Prince Brilliant: short; intellectual; well-read; always means what he says; straightforward; desires to be as tall as lady Daffodilia; grows tall in dream-land and returns happily to Lady Daffodilia.
