= The Wonderful Toymaker =

Evelyn Sharp's short story "The Wonderful Toymaker" is part of a collection of fairy tales in the book, All the Way to Fairyland: Fairy Stories. The Cambridge University Press originally published the anthology in 1897. An EBook version was made available through The Project Gutenberg on 3 November 2009.

== Plot ==
The tale of "The Wonderful Toymaker" begins with a spoiled princess named Petulant, an eight-year-old girl who cannot be pleased at any cost. Her father, the King, gathers his council together to help find a toy for the Princess that will surpass all others. The Prime Minister volunteers his son Martin to find the princess a special toy. Martin talks with Princess Petulant and promises to return in four weeks with an amazing toy.

At the beginning of Martin's journey he encounters Bobolink, the Purple Enchanter who knows everything. Martin hopes that Bobolink will help him to find his way to The Wonderful Toymaker. However, Bobolink is annoyed about having to provide information about everything to everyone, and is initially reluctant to assist Martin. Martin's lack of flattery towards him serves as a refreshing change, and Bobolink soon becomes quite eager to help him. Bobolink tells Martin that his next step is to reach the pine dwarfs, warning him to avoid conversation with the creatures or he will be stuck in the country of conversation forever. Martin almost makes it through the country of conversation without a single word, but he becomes distracted and engages in conversation with a fish. Martin's error forces him to "become conversation," and suddenly he is trapped with no way out. The princess continues to wait patiently but she eventually becomes very upset that Martin has not returned with her toy. The council becomes worried, and contemplates where Martin could possibly be. The Princess, alone and sobbing, is confronted by a pine dwarf who promises to bring her to the waterfall and show her the way to Martin. The Princess stuffs her ears with cotton and begins her journey.

Princess Petulant finally makes it to Martin without speaking a single word, and they are both able to escape. The two run as fast as they can to the toyshop. The Toymaker, so pleased to see them, wishes that they stay and play with him forever. Martin and Princess Petulant play with the best toys they have ever seen, finally satisfying the Princess’ desire for a new toy. Martin and Princess Petulant tell the Toymaker that they are unable to stay and although he is sad, he assists them in their journey home. Upon their return they tell the entire story to a Royal Historian who records it all in the very book in which this story is contained.

== Author ==
Sharp (4 August 1869 – 17 June 1955) was a British suffragette and Children's writer born in Denmark Hill, London. She was prevented from receiving a formal education by her family for quite some time, but later entered school and attended Collège de France. Sharp began writing novels and short stories that reflected her understanding of children's perspectives, as well as her evolving perspectives on life, social issues, and women's rights. In 1906, after becoming inspired by a speech by suffragette Elizabeth Robins, she became active and devoted to the women's suffrage movement. Sharp married Henry Nevinson in 1933. He died in 1941. Sharp fell into a depression and eventually became blind; she died in London in 1955.

== Other works ==
From 1903 she was a journalist, writing primarily for The Daily Herald, The Manchester Guardian, Pall Mall Gazette, and The Morning Leader. Sharp's "first short stories appeared in The Yellow Book, and her first novel, At The Relton Arms (1895)."

== Illustrator ==
Mrs Percy Dearmer produced all of the illustrations for Sharp's anthology of short stories “All the Way to Fairyland: Fairy Stories.”
