= International Conference on African Children =

The International Conference on African Children or Conference on the African Child was an international conference held in Geneva in June 1931.

Organised by the International Save the Children Union, it followed on from the adoption by the League of Nations in 1924 of the Declaration of the Rights of the Child, drafted by the Union in 1923. It focused on the conditions of children in Africa, specifically in the areas of infant mortality, child labour and education.

The conference met in Geneva in the summer of 1931, between 22 and 25 June. It is considered a turning point in western attitudes to childhood in Africa: "this conference reconstructed the images of childhood in Africa among missionaries, child welfare humanitarians and social scientists". There were only five Africans among the participants, although even this level of participation was unusual at the time. One of these was Jomo Kenyatta of the Kikuyu Central Association. Kenyatta wrote about the conference later, on the subject of circumcision and female genital mutilation, which he defended as a cultural practice among the Kikuyu:

"In this conference several European delegates urged that the time was ripe when this "barbarous custom" should be abolished, and that, like all other "heathen" customs, it should be abolished at once by law."

Other African representatives were teacher and writer Gladys Casely-Hayford, daughter of the Ghanaian politician J. E. Casely Hayford, and Nigerian educator Henry Carr. Another black speaker was the American activist James W. Ford of the League Against Imperialism, who gave a speech criticising the conference for merely supporting the colonial order.

The conference secretary was writer Evelyn Sharp, who wrote a book about it called The African Child. Another contributor was a missionary, Dora Earthy.

== See also ==
- Campaign against female genital mutilation in Kenya in 1929–32
- Decolonization of Africa
- Declaration of the Rights of the Child

== Sources ==
- Proceedings of the International Conference on African Children, Geneva, June 22–23, 1931 (Save the Children, 1932)
- Evelyn Sharp, The African Child: An Account of the International Conference on African Children, Geneva (Longmans and Co. / Weardale Press, 1931) ISBN 978-0837150956
- Dominique Marshall, 'Children's Rights in Imperial Political Cultures: Missionary and Humanitarian Contributions to the Conference on the African Child of 1931', in The International Journal of Children's Rights, Volume 12, Issue 3, pages 273 – 318 (2004).
