= The Kite That Went to the Moon =

- Short story by Evelyn Sharp
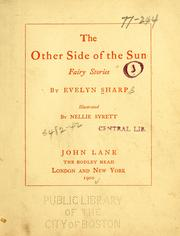
- Country: Britain
- Language: English
- Genre(s): Children's literature

Publication
- Published in: The Other Side of the Sun
- Publisher: John Lane
- Media type: Print
- Publication date: 1900
- Pages: 25

"The Kite That Went to the Moon" is a children's tale written by Evelyn Sharp. It was published in 1900 as part of a collection of short stories called The Other Side of the Sun.

== Plot ==
A young boy named Jerry made the largest kite in the town with his own hands. His friend, Chubby – the woodcutter's daughter – painted a moon and several stars on the kite. Jerry feels proud of the kite, and heads to the field to make it fly to the moon. Jerry attempts to fly the kite in the day with all the other boys and girls watching, but unfortunately the kite fails to fly. Jerry feels defeated and embarrassed as the village children laugh at him, and he goes to find Chubby. Together, Jerry and Chubby take the kite and proceed to go on a quest to find someone who knows why Jerry's kite will not fly.

As the two set off further into the woods, Chubby becomes unbearably hungry, forcing Jerry to search for something to eat. On his search, he comes across a mystical man with a sack containing everything in the world, so Jerry asks the man for something that Chubby can eat. The mystical man gives Jerry a cake that tastes of whatever the eater likes best, and replenishes itself whenever the eater takes a bite. However, when Jerry returns to Chubby after finding food for her, the two children realize the kite is gone. At this time it is dark out and night has begun. It is also at this time that Jerry and Chubby meet another mystical creature called a wymp. The wymp appears out of nowhere and explains to the children that the kite failed to fly to the moon earlier because it was daytime and there was no moon present. Jerry asks the wymp if he can take them to the moon to see his kite and the wymp obliges.

The two children and the wymp ride a comet up to the moon, where they find Jerry's kite and meet the shimmering, delicate Lady of the Moon. The wymp disappears, for it is frightened of The Lady of the Moon. The stern Lady of the Moon is not happy the children have entered her territory, and she tells them to leave. Before they are swallowed up by the setting of the moon, the children ride the kite back home, showing all the other children in the village that the kite really could fly. The kite, however, returns to the sky and remains a comet for the rest of time.

== Characters ==
There are 4 characters in "The Kite that went to the Moon": Jerry, Chubby, the wymp, and the Lady of the Moon. Jerry is the young boy who made the biggest kite in the village. Chubby is the woodcutter's daughter, and a friend of Jerry's. It was she who painted the moon and stars on Jerry's kite. The wymp is a mythical creature who Jerry and Chubby meet along their journey. The wymp is the one who tells Jerry why his kite initially failed to fly to the moon, and it takes Jerry and Chubby to the moon. The Lady of the Moon is the last character that Jerry and Chubby meet along their journey; she is a stern but fair character who is mad at Jerry and Chubby for entering her country.

== Publication ==
"The Kite That Went to the Moon" was written in 1899 and first published by John Lane at The Bodley Head in London and New York in 1900, in the book of fairy tales The Other Side of the Sun by Evelyn Sharp (1869–1955).

== Sources ==
- Sharp, Evelyn. The Other Side of the Sun: Fairy Stories. London, John Lane, 1900. Print. pg 163–188.
- Evelyn Sharp Biography
