= The Little Princess and the Poet =

"The Little Princess and the Poet" is one of Evelyn Sharp's many fairytales, written in 1898. This short children's story sends the message that beauty is not always seen on the surface but found within the heart of a person. It is part of Sharp's popular story collection, All the Way to Fairyland.

== Plot summary ==
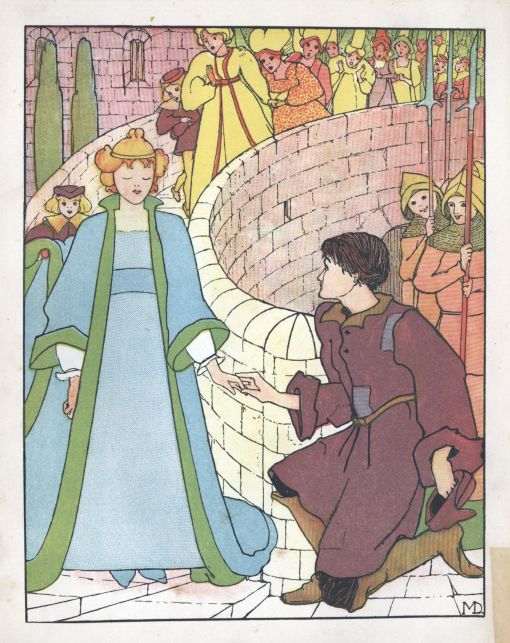
"Come with me, Poet", said the Little Princess.

There once was a poet who was unable to do anything useful and instead spent all of his time writing poetry. Unfortunately, the poet was not particularly nice to look at and was often sent away because people could not bear to look at his ugly features. As a result, he traveled from place to place singing his poetry to people who did not listen. During his travels the poet visited a city he had never been to before and, as usual, he went immediately to the poor, because it was about them that he always wrote. When they heard his poetry they grumbled and asked why he was telling them about their woes when they already knew all about them. Then they sent him up to the palace because the Princess was blind and enjoyed listening to poetry all day.

Thrilled that he was finally wanted somewhere, the poet went to the palace immediately. Upon his arrival, the guards at the gate initially turned him away because he was not as attractive as all of the other poets that had been to see the blind Princess. Luckily, the Princess heard the poet at the gate and sensed that he was a real poet—unlike all of the princes who claimed to be poets. She took the poet by the hand and took him up to the palace where the entire court was just sitting down to lunch.

The King and Queen, however, were less than overjoyed by the poet's sudden appearance in their court. Despite their attempts to convince her, the Princess was adamant that he stay. Over lunch, the poet sang a poem about the poor and the hardships that they face. When he was done, everyone was stunned, and the 45 princes who claimed to be poets stood up and left, knowing that they were not real poets. When the Queen had recovered from the surprise, she tried to persuade the Princess that the poet had to leave because he was not suitable company for a princess. Despite her objections, the poet knew it was true and told the Princess that he had to leave.

The poet went back to traveling, and one day came to a place far away from the blind Princess and sang of his love for her to the poor. When he was done, they told him that if he kissed the Princess on each eyelid while she was sleeping, her blindness would be cured, even though she had been blind since birth. He hurried back to the palace of the blind Princess and told her parents his purpose. Although they were unsure, they were also intrigued and agreed to let him try, on condition that he left immediately after kissing her. Conveniently, the Princess was asleep in the garden at the time and the poet was able to kiss her. When she awoke, the Princess was no longer blind and asked to see all the beauty that she had been missing. However, nothing that she saw looked beautiful to her and she instead decided that she wanted to see something ugly. When she was told that there was nothing ugly in the Palace, the Princess went outside and came upon the poet who had been unable to stay away, and looking at him, she finally found beauty.

== See also ==
- Original Story
- The Youngest Girl in the School
