= Meditation (Maryon) =

1910 sculpture by Edith Maryon

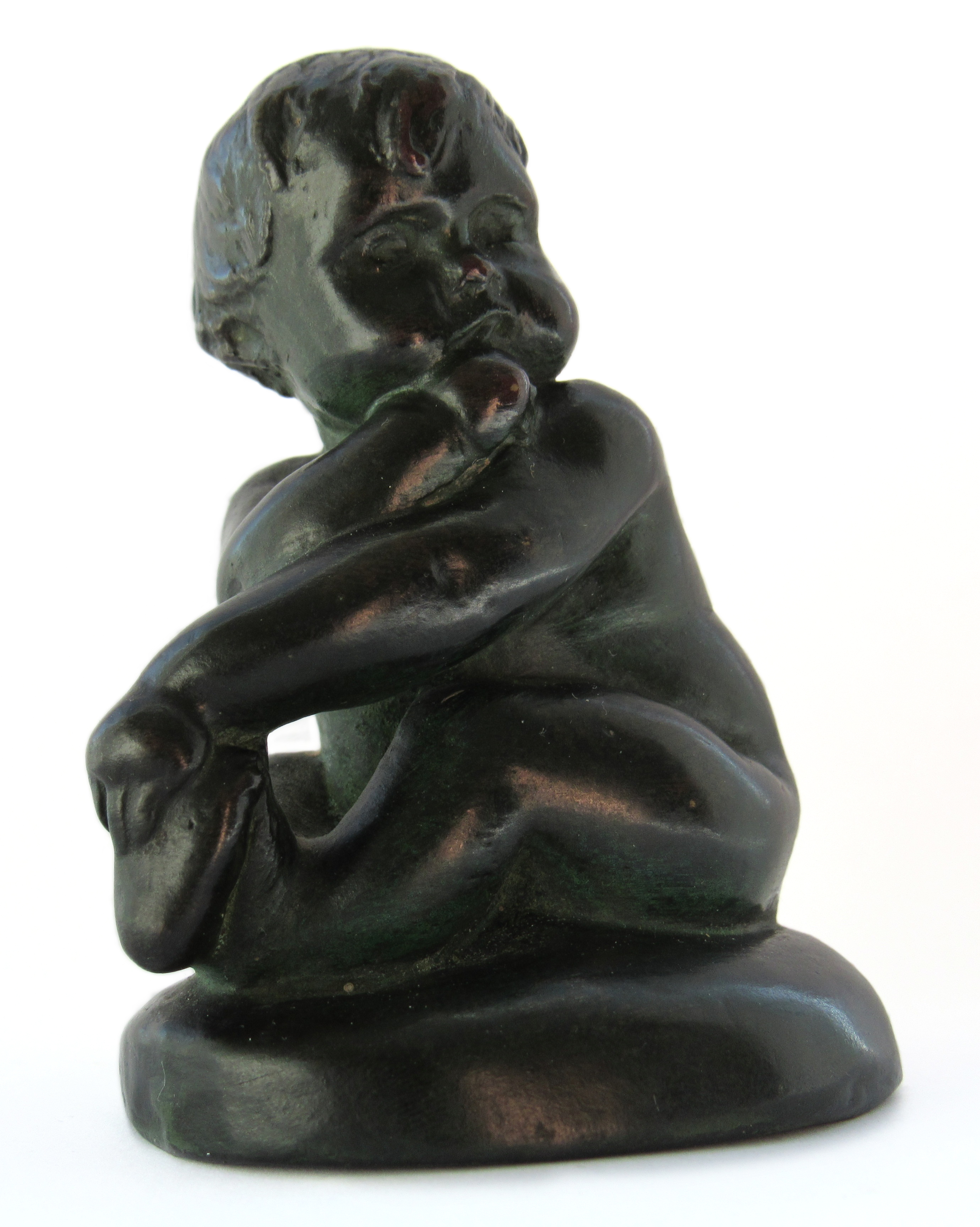
- Artist: Edith Maryon
- Year: 1910
- Medium: Bronze, plaster, or gilt plaster, depending on the version
- Dimensions: 8 cm (3 in) tall

Meditation is a 1910 sculpture by the English artist Edith Maryon. The work exists in at least three versions: bronze, plaster, and gilt plaster. It is 8 centimetres (3 inches) tall and depicts a naked infant clutching its foot with one hand, while sucking the thumb of its other hand.

The sculpture is signed and dated "E Maryon 10", for Edith Maryon 1910. Maryon exhibited it that year at the Fortieth Autumn Exhibition of Modern Art at the Walker Art Gallery in Liverpool. She created at least three versions of the piece. One, in gilt plaster, was purchased by William Lever, 1st Viscount Leverhulme and displayed at the Lady Lever Art Gallery. A second, in plaster, was attributed in 1993 to a private collection. A third, in bronze, was auctioned in 2019. The sculpture is one of the few works by Maryon known to survive in private ownership.

== Background ==
Edith Maryon was born in London on 9 February 1872. She was educated there and in Geneva, and then studied art, including at the Royal College of Art. Between 1899 and 1912, when Maryon was approximately 27 to 40 years old and living in London, she exhibited numerous works, particularly at the Royal Academy of Arts and the Walker Art Gallery. These works, according to her biographer Rex Raab, tended to fall into five categories: first, the world of external physical being; second, references to the elemental world; third, motifs reflecting the human soul; fourth, allegorical works representing spiritual forces and beings; and fifth, a combination of emotional and spiritual aspects. Maryon exhibited little, if at all, after 1912.

Maryon began exploring occult beliefs at least as early as 1909, and in 1912 travelled to Germany to meet the anthroposophist Rudolf Steiner for the first time. In 1914 she travelled to Dornach—the place where Steiner had resolved to centre the anthroposophical movement and build the Goetheanum as its central structure. Over the next decade, until her death in 1924, Maryon rarely left Dornach. She became a close collaborator of Steiner; among other contributions while there, she was heavily involved in creating both the monumental sculpture The Representative of Humanity, and the eurythmy figures depicting an anthroposophical form of dance.

== Description ==
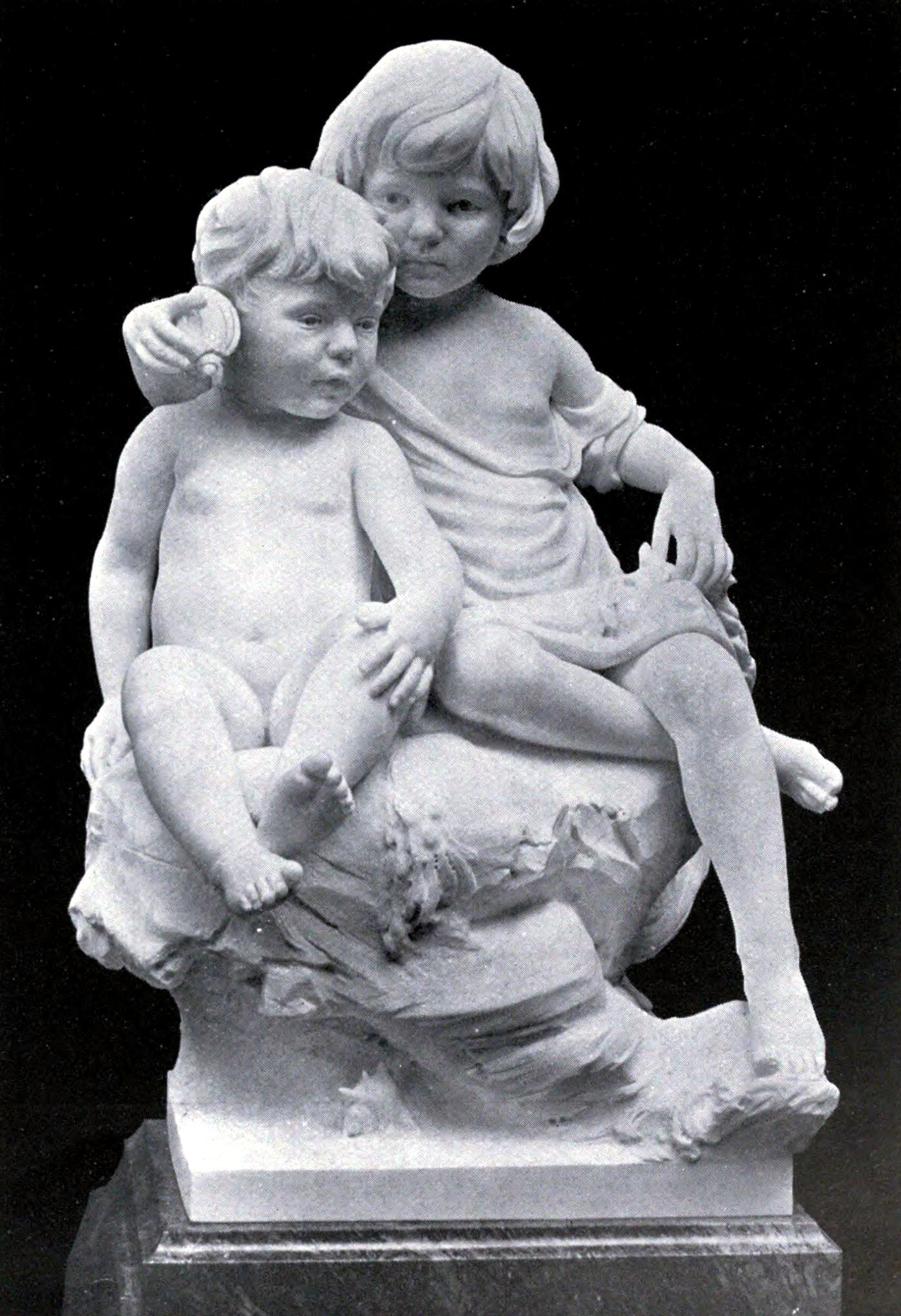
Maryon's "Listen!" Evelyn and Gloria, children of Sir Rennell and Lady Rodd (1903)

Meditation is 8 cm tall. The sculpture exists in at least three media: bronze, plaster, and gilt plaster. The sculpture includes a round base, upon which a small child sits. With its left hand, the child clutches its left foot. The right hand is raised to the child's mouth, where it sucks its thumb. The base is signed and dated "E Maryon 10", for Edith Maryon 1910.

The sculpture shares similarities with one that Maryon created in 1903, "Listen!" Evelyn and Gloria, children of Sir Rennell and Lady Rodd. That sculpture was made of marble, exhibited at the Royal Academy of Arts in 1903 and 1904, and at the Thirty-fourth Autumn Exhibition at the Walker Art Gallery from 1904 to 1905. In his 1993 biography of Maryon, Raab describes Meditation as a study for the earlier piece.

== Provenance ==
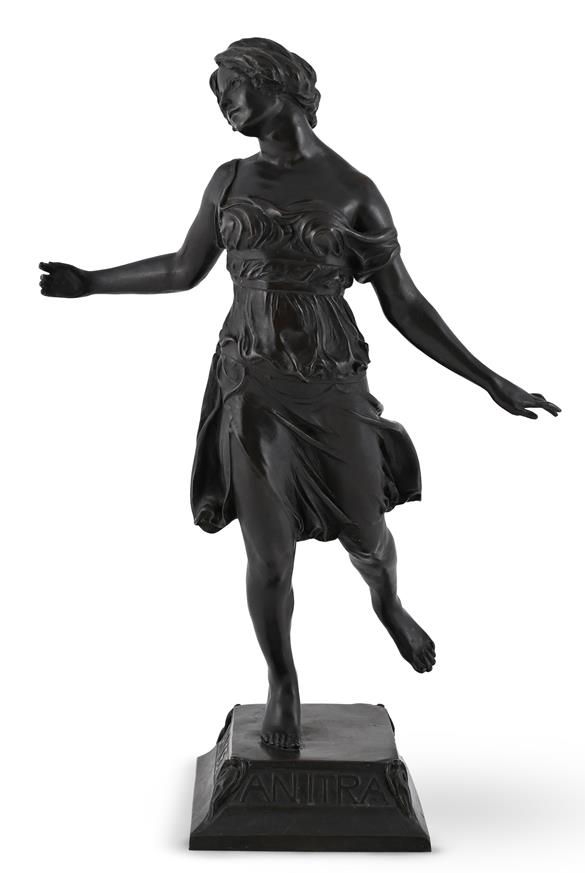
The Dance of Anitra (1909), exhibited alongside Meditation

Maryon exhibited a bronze version of Meditation at the Fortieth Autumn Exhibition of Modern Art at the Walker Art Gallery in Liverpool from 19 September 1910 to 7 January 1911. The work was priced at 10s 10d (equivalent to £80 in 2024), although it did not sell during the exhibition. Maryon also displayed four other works at the exhibition: Fairy Luck, The Dance of Anitra, To the Witches' Revels, and Miss Ruth Franklin.

At least three examples of Meditation were created, one in each known medium. A version in gilt plaster was purchased by William Lever, 1st Viscount Leverhulme and displayed at the Lady Lever Art Gallery. By 1999, however, it was no longer part of the collection. A second version, in plaster, was pictured in Raab's 1993 biography of Maryon, attributed to a private collection. A third version, in bronze, was auctioned by East Bristol Auctions in February 2019. (Note: In May 2023, East Bristol Auctions rebranded as Auctioneum.) Meditation, along with The Dance of Anitra and To the Witches' Revels, is one of the few works by Maryon known to survive in private hands.

== Bibliography ==
- Clay, Andrew; Morris, Edward; Penketh, Sandra & Stevens, Timothy (1999). "British Sculpture acquired by W.H. Lever but not now in the Lady Lever Art Gallery". British Sculpture in the Lady Lever Art Gallery. Liverpool: Board of Trustees of the National Museums and Galleries on Merseyside. p. 81. ISBN 0-906367-98-0.
- Fine Furniture, Sculpture, Carpets, Ceramics & Works of Art. Newbury: Dreweatts. 2025. OCLC 1533462166.

- The Dance of Anitra lot published online with revisions as "Edith Maryon (1872–1924), A Bronze Figure of Maud Allan- Dance of Anitra, Dated 1909". Dreweatts. 11 September 2025. Archived from the original on 11 September 2025.

- Maryon, John Ernest (1895). Records and Pedigree of the Family of Maryon of Essex and Herts. London: Self-published.
- Raab, Rex (1993). Edith Maryon: Bildhauerin und Mitarbeiterin Rudolf Steiners [Edith Maryon: Sculptor and collaborator of Rudolf Steiner]. Pioniere der Anthroposophie (in German). Vol. XI. Dornach: Philosophisch-Anthroposophischer Verlag am Goetheanum. ISBN 3-7235-0648-8.
- Selg, Peter (2006). Edith Maryon: Rudolf Steiner and die Dornacher Christus-Plastik [Edith Maryon: Rudolf Steiner and the Sculpture of Christ in Dornach]. Studien zu esoterischen Schülern Rudolf Steiners (in German). Vol. 3. Dornach: Verlag am Goetheanum. ISBN 978-3-7235-1286-9.

- Translated into English as Selg, Peter (2022). Edith Maryon: Rudolf Steiner and the Sculpture of Christ in Dornach. Translated by Barton, Matthew. Forest Row: Temple Lodge Publishing. ISBN 978-1-912230-95-2.

- Steiner, Rudolf (1990). Donat, Konrad (ed.). Rudolf Steiner / Edith Maryon: Briefwechsel [Rudolf Steiner / Edith Maryon: Correspondence] (PDF). Rudolf Steiner Gesamtausgabe (in German). Vol. 263/1. Dornach: Rudolf Steiner Verlag. ISBN 3-7274-2631-4.

Royal Academy of Arts exhibition catalogues

- The Exhibition of the Royal Academy of Arts. Vol. 135. London: Royal Academy of Arts. 1903.
- The Exhibition of the Royal Academy of Arts. Vol. 136. London: Royal Academy of Arts. 1904.

Walker Gallery Autumn exhibition catalogues

- Thirty-fourth Autumn Exhibition of Modern Art. Liverpool: Corporation of Liverpool, Walker Art Gallery. 1904. OCLC 22433402.
- Fortieth Autumn Exhibition of Modern Art: Catalogue (7th ed.). Liverpool: Corporation of Liverpool, Walker Art Gallery. 1910. OCLC 22433402.
