= Anna Eichberg King =

American author (died 1927)

Anna Eichberg King (died 1927) was an American author. Her stories of Dutch life were published in Century Magazine. She also had articles published in other periodicals. She wrote several books.

She was born in Geneva, Switzerland and her father was a violinist, professor, composer and music conservatory founder Julius Eichberg. Sophie née Mertens Eichenberg was her mother.

She attended Girls' High School and Gannett Institute for Young Ladies in Boston. She married Tyler Batcheller King in Boston in 1884. After becoming a widow, she lived in a Back Bay mansion with her mother. Her second marriage was to publisher John Lane August 13, 1898 in London.

She wrote the lyrics for the national hymn To Thee, O Country and her father wrote the music. Her books include Brown's Retreat, Kitwyk (published by John Lane in 1903), The Champagne Standard, Talk of the Town and War Phases According to Maria.

She was close friends with Celia Thaxter. She corresponded with Margaret Roberts.

== Writings ==
- Brown's Retreat and Other Stories
- Kitwyk Stories illistrated by George Wharton Edwards
- The Champagne Standard (1905)
- Talk of the Town John Lane, London (1911)
- War Phases According to Maria
