= Evelyn Sharp (suffragist) =

English author and suffragist (1869–1955)

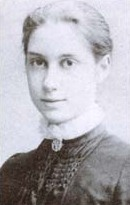
- Born: Evelyn Jane Sharp; 4 August 1869; London, England
- Died: 17 June 1955 (aged 85); London, England
- Occupations: Writer, Suffragist
- Spouse: Henry Nevinson
- Relatives: Cecil Sharp (brother)

Evelyn Jane Nevinson (née Sharp; 4 August 1869 – 17 June 1955), better known as Evelyn Sharp, was a British pacifist and writer who was a key figure in two major women's suffrage societies, the militant Women's Social and Political Union and the United Suffragists. She helped found the latter and became editor of Votes for Women during the First World War. She was twice imprisoned and became a tax resister. An established author who had published in The Yellow Book, she was especially well known for her children's fiction.

== Early life ==
Evelyn Sharp, the ninth of eleven children, was born on 4 August 1869. Cecil Sharp, the folk-song collector, was her elder brother. Sharp's family sent her to a boarding school. She went to a Parisian finishing school while her brothers went to university.

In 1894, against the wishes of her family, she moved to London, where she worked as a private tutor and wrote several novels, including All the Way to Fairyland (1898) and The Other Side of the Sun (1900).

In 1903 Sharp, with the help of her friend and lover, Henry Nevinson, began to find work writing articles for the Daily Chronicle, the Pall Mall Gazette and the Manchester Guardian, a newspaper that published her work for over thirty years. Sharp highlights the importance of Nevinson and the Men's League for Women's Suffrage: "It is impossible to rate too highly the sacrifices that they (Henry Nevinson and Laurence Housman) and H. N. Brailsford, F. W. Pethick Lawrence, Harold Laski, Israel Zangwill, Gerald Gould, George Lansbury, and many others made to keep our movement free from the suggestion of a sex war."

Sharp's journalism made her more aware of the problems of working-class women and she joined the Women's Industrial Council and the National Union of Women's Suffrage Societies. In the autumn of 1906 Sharp was sent by the Manchester Guardian to cover the first speech by actress and novelist Elizabeth Robins. Sharp was moved by Robins' arguments for militant action and she joined the Women's Social and Political Union.

The impression she made was profound, even on an audience predisposed to be hostile; and on me it was disastrous. From that moment I was not to know again for 12 years, if indeed ever again, what it meant to cease from mental strife; and I soon came to see with a horrible clarity why I had always hitherto shunned causes.

== Militant activism ==
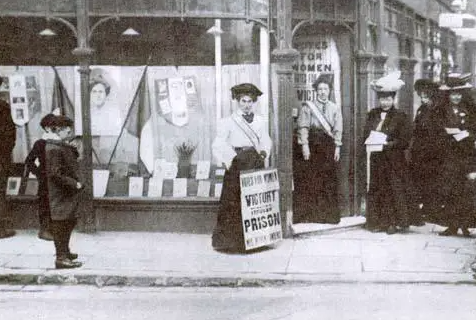
Evelyn Sharp selling Votes for Women in 1909

Evelyn's mother, Jane, concerned at her daughter having joined the WSPU, made her promise not to do anything that would result in her being imprisoned. Although she wrote in Votes for Women about Elsie Howey, dressed as Joan of Arc, a girl on a white horse leading a procession of hundreds of suffragettes to a meeting at the Aldwych Theatre on 17 April 1909 (fittingly the day before Joan of Arc was beatified) as representing "a battle against prejudice that is as ancient as it is modern", and befriended suffragette Helen Craggs and others, Sharp did keep her promise for five years, until her mother absolved her from that promise in November 1911.

Although I hope you will never go to prison, still, I feel I cannot any longer be so prejudiced, and must leave it to your better judgment. I have really been very unhappy about it and feel I have no right to thwart you, much as I should regret feeling that you were undergoing those terrible hardships. It has caused you as much pain as it has me, and I feel I can no longer think of my own feelings. I cannot write more, but you will be happy now, won't you. (Jane Sharp, letter to her daughter (November, 1911)

Evelyn immediately became active in the militant campaign, and later that month she was imprisoned for fourteen days.

My opportunity came with a militant demonstration in Parliament Square on the evening of November 11, provoked by a more than usually cynical postponement of the Women's Bill, which was implied in a Government forecast of manhood suffrage. I was one of the many selected to carry out our new policy of breaking Government office windows, which marked a departure from the attitude of passive resistance that for five years had permitted all the violence to be used against us.

In March 1912 Sharp acted as go-between for the leaders of WSPU, taking a cheque for £7,000 to be authorised by Christabel Pankhurst to transfer funds to the personal account of Hertha Ayrton to avoid confiscation after the Scotland Yard raid on the Clement's Inn offices.

In April 1913, the government passed the Prisoners (Temporary Discharge for Ill Health) Act 1913), to find a new way to deal with the suffragettes' hunger strikes. Previously, the prison warders and medical staff force-fed the activists by naso-gastric tube; the so-called Cat and Mouse Act enabled the authorities to release hunger-strikers deemed to be too weak to be active, permitting their re-arrest after a period of recuperation. Sharp, an active member of the Women Writers' Suffrage League, represented it in a delegation to meet with the Home Secretary, Reginald McKenna, who proved unwilling to discuss the issue. Whe the delgation refused to leave the House of Commons, Mary Macarthur and Margaret McMillan were physically ejected and Sharp and Emmeline Pethick-Lawrence were arrested and sent to Holloway Prison.

With Nevinson, the Pethick-Lawrences, the Harbens, the Lansburys, Dr Louisa Garrett Anderson, Gerald Gould, Barbara Ayrton-Gould, Evelina Haverfield and Lena Ashwell, Sharp was a founding member of the United Suffragists, which accepted men and women and attracted members from NUWSS and WSPU perhaps disillusioned with tactics of each of these groups, on 14 February 1914.

== First World War resistance ==
Unlike most members of the women's movement (a notable exception being Sylvia Pankhurst who also rejected the nationalist line), Sharp was unwilling to end the campaign for the vote during the First World War. When she continued to refuse to pay income tax she was arrested and all of her property confiscated, including her typewriter. A pacifist, Sharp was also active in the Women's International League for Peace during the war. She would later record:

Personally, holding as I do the enfranchisement of women involved greater issues than could be involved in any war, even supposing that the objects of the Great War were those alleged, I cannot help regretting that any justification was given for the popular error which still sometimes ascribes the victory of the suffrage cause, in 1918, to women's war service. This assumption is true only in so far as gratitude to women offered an excuse to the anti-suffragists in the Cabinet and elsewhere to climb down with some dignity from a position that had become untenable before the war. I sometimes think that the art of politics consists in the provision of ladders to enable politicians to climb down from untenable positions.

During the First World War the Votes for Women newspaper continued to appear, but with a much-reduced circulation, and it struggled to remain financially viable. Sharp reoriented the paper to appeal more to middle-class women, with the slogan "The War Paper for Women". Although she personally came to oppose the war, she ensured that the paper maintained a neutral stance on it. At the end of the war, the Representation of the People Act 1918 gave (some) women the right to vote. The United Suffragists, who published the newspaper, disbanded, and presented Sharp with a book signed by the members.

== After the First World War ==
After the Armistice, Sharp, now a member of the Labour Party, worked as a journalist on the Daily Herald and also for the Society of Friends in Germany. She was a member of the Women's World Committee Against War and Fascism along with Ellen Wilkinson, Vera Brittain and Storm Jameson.

Sharp wrote on a range of topics. In 1926, she wrote a biography of electrical engineer and suffragist Hertha Ayrton, at the request of her daughter Barbara Ayrton-Gould. Ten years after the war, Sharp wrote two studies of working-class life, The London Child (1927), illustrated by Eve Garnett, and The Child Grows Up (1929). In 1931, she wrote a report on the International Conference on African Children which discussed child slavery and the practice of child pawning in Liberia. Sharp's autobiography, Unfinished Adventure, was published in 1933. (It was republished by Faber in 2009.) She wrote the essay on Mary Wollstonecraft for the 1934 book Great Democrats by Alfred Barratt Brown.

== Personal life ==
In 1933 Sharp's friend Margaret Nevinson died. Soon afterwards, aged 63, she married the widower, Henry Nevinson, by then aged 77. Their love affair had lasted many years, withstanding complications of friendship and marriage.

Sharp died in a nursing home in Ealing on 17 June 1955.

== Quotations ==
- Reforms can always wait a little longer, but freedom, directly you discover you haven't got it, will not wait another minute.

== Primary sources ==
Sharp's papers, including Diaries of Evelyn Sharp, 1920–37, 1942–7, are in the care of the Bodleian Library.

== See also ==
- Women's suffrage in the United Kingdom
