= Works of Edith Maryon =

The works of Edith Maryon (1872–1924) consist primarily of sculptures, and were made primarily in bronze and plaster. Maryon made the works in two main stages. First, from 1898 to 1912, when Maryon was living in London and approximately 26 to 40 years old, she created and exhibited numerous works. After a move to Dornach in 1914 to collaborate with Rudolf Steiner and the Anthroposophical Society, her work was focused on the society, and took on esoteric forms.

Maryon exhibited works frequently while in London, particularly at the Royal Academy of Arts and the Walker Art Gallery; with the former exhibition held during the summer and the latter during the autumn, many of her works were exhibited at both. These works, according to her biographer Rex Raab, tended to fall into five categories: first, the world of external physical being; second, references to the elemental world; third, motifs reflecting the human soul; fourth, allegorical works representing spiritual forces and beings; and fifth, a combination of emotional and spiritual aspects. The shift in focus away from the elemental world and towards the spiritual, he observed, appears to have taken place around 1905 to 1907. Maryon exhibited little if at all after 1912.

Following Maryon's 1914 move to Dornach, and until her death a decade later, she created and collaborated on anthroposophical forms of art. Among other works, she was heavily involved in creating both the monumental sculpture The Representative of Humanity, and the eurythmy figures depicting an anthroposophical form of dance.

== Works ==
The following is an incomplete list of the works of Edith Maryon.

Image	Title/Description	Date	Dimensions	Location	Comments
	Modelled head from life	1898			Displayed at the Camden School of Art, where it won both a National Bronze Medal and a Queen's Prize, and where Maryon won a £40 (equivalent to £5,600 in 2024) School of Art Scholarship. Maryon's brother Herbert Maryon also won a prize, for a wrought metal casket, as well as a scholarship.
	Panel for screen	1899			Displayed at the New Gallery for the 1899 Arts and Crafts Exhibition Society exhibition.
Black-and-white photograph of a modeled figure by Edith Maryon	Modeled figure	1899			Displayed at the 1899 National Art Competition in South Kensington, where it won a bronze medal.
	Religion	1900			Sketch model of a figure for a public building. Possibly exhibited in January 1899 at the Glasgow Art Galleries Sculpture Competition, where a sculpture by Maryon on the subject "Religion" was commended. Exhibited at the Royal Academy of Arts from 7 May to 6 August 1900, with the catalogue quoting Ephesians 6:11, "Put on the whole armour of God." Exhibited at the Thirtieth Autumn Exhibition at the Walker Art Gallery from 17 September 1900 to 5 January 1901, priced at £15 15s (equivalent to £2,200 in 2024), and with the catalogue quoting the same line from Ephesians. Displayed at the Leeds City Art Gallery for the 1901 spring exhibition, also priced at £15 15s (equivalent to £2,200 in 2024). Said by Marion Spielmann to "show taste and elegance" and be "full of promise".
Black and white photograph of a sculpture by Edith Maryon	Model of a figure from the nude	1900			Displayed at the Victoria and Albert Museum as part of the 1900 National Competition of Schools of Art and Art Classes, where it won a gold medal. Maryon won one of two Princess of Wales scholarships. Pictured in The Magazine of Art in 1901. Maryon was pictured in The Ladies' Field afterwards.
Black and white photograph of a plaster relief by Edith Maryon	Plaster relief	1900			Displayed at the 1900 exhibition of the Royal College of Art's South Kensington Sketch Club, where Maryon (possibly for this piece) won an award offered by The Artist for an adaptation of the human figure to some applied art object.
Black and white photograph of Edith Maryon's sculpture A Sketch in Clay	A Sketch in Clay	1900			Displayed at the 1900 exhibition of the Royal College of Art's South Kensington Sketch Club, where it won an award for modelling offered by Édouard Lantéri.
Black and white photograph of Edith Maryon's relief May Morning	May Morning	1901			Relief, portion of a fireplace. Exhibited at the Royal Academy of Arts from 6 May to 5 August 1901, with the catalogue quoting William Wordsworth, "When youths and maids At peep of dawn would rise, And wander forth, in forest glades Thy birth to solemnize." Pictured in a review of the exhibition in The Builder, with the magazine terming it a "spirited panel in relief". Exhibited at the Thirty-first Autumn Exhibition at the Walker Art Gallery from 16 September 1901 to 4 January 1902, priced at £52 10s (equivalent to £7,300 in 2024), and with the catalogue quoting the same lines by Wordsworth. Pictured in Marion Spielmann's 1901 book British Sculpture and Sculptors of Today, and said to "show taste and elegance" and be "full of promise"; in The Magazine of Art, he wrote that it was "somewhat ambitious in design, although a little conventional perhaps; it is frankly student's work, but full of cleverness, grace, and distinction, and even fuller of promise, for the lady is working in a good school".
	Portrait medallion	1901			Metal in relief. Exhibited at the Royal Academy of Arts from 6 May to 5 August 1901.
	Joan d'Arc	1901			Relief. Exhibited at the 1901 Glasgow International Exhibition.
	Mother and child	1901			Group. Exhibited at the Royal Academy of Arts from 4 May to 3 August 1903. Said by Marion Spielmann to "show taste and elegance" and be "full of promise".
	Auf Weidersehn	1902			Displayed at the Leeds City Art Gallery for the 1902 spring exhibition, priced at £12 12s (equivalent to £1,800 in 2024).
	Cupid and Psyche	1902			Clasp, silver enamel. Exhibited at the Royal Academy of Arts from 5 May to 4 August 1902.
	Francis, son of Sir Rennell and Lady Rodd	1902			Medallion. Exhibited at the Royal Academy of Arts from 5 May to 4 August 1902.
	Miss Mildred Maryon	1903			Plaster bust. Exhibited at the Royal Academy of Arts from 4 May to 3 August 1903. Exhibited at the Thirty-third Autumn Exhibition at the Walker Art Gallery from 14 September 1903 to 2 January 1904, not priced for sale. Pictured in Raab 1993, abb. 15.
	Rev. Canon Rawnsley	1903		Keswick Museum	Bronze relief. Exhibited at the Royal Academy of Arts from 4 May to 3 August 1903.
Black and white photograph of Edith Maryon's sculpture Evelyn and Gloria, children of Sir Rennell and Lady Rodd	"Listen!" Evelyn and Gloria, children of Sir Rennell and Lady Rodd	1903			Marble. Exhibited at the Royal Academy of Arts from 4 May to 3 August 1903, and again from 2 May to 1 August 1904 under the name Evelyn and Gloria: children of Sir Rennell and Lady Rodd. Exhibited under the latter name at the Thirty-fourth Autumn Exhibition at the Walker Art Gallery from 12 September 1904 to 7 January 1905, not priced for sale. According to Raab, these are different works.
Black and white photograph of Edith Maryon's sculpture The Messenger of Death	The Messenger of Death	1904			Exhibited at the Royal Academy of Arts from 2 May to 1 August 1904, with line "One shall be taken, the other left". According to The Graphic, the sculpture "proves that a lady sculptor of real strength and individuality has arisen amongst us".
Black and white photograph of Edith Maryon's sculpture The Triumph of Peace	The Triumph of Peace	1904			Exhibited at the New Gallery in 1904. According to Raab, the same work as Peace and War.
	Miss Rose Gough, daughter of the Hon. Mrs. Denison	1904			Marble bust. Exhibited at the Royal Academy of Arts from 2 May to 1 August 1904.
	St. Michael	1904 or 1905			Plaster statuette. Exhibited at the Thirty-fifth Autumn Exhibition at the Walker Art Gallery from 18 September 1905 to 6 January 1906, priced at £15 15s (equivalent to £2,200 in 2024). Pictured in Raab 1993, abb. 16.
	Peace and War	1905			Sketch model for a frieze. Exhibited at the Royal Academy of Arts from 1 May to 7 August 1905. Exhibited at the Thirty-fifth Autumn Exhibition at the Walker Art Gallery from 18 September 1905 to 6 January 1906, priced at £10 10s (equivalent to £1,500 in 2024). According to Raab, the same work as The Triumph of Peace.
	The Singer	1905			
	Sleep	1905			
Black and white photograph of Edith Maryon's sculpture The Pixies' Ring	The Pixies' Ring	1906			Versions in plaster and marble. Exhibited at the Royal Academy of Arts from 7 May to 6 August 1906. Exhibited at the Thirty-sixth Autumn Exhibition at the Walker Art Gallery from 17 September 1906 to 5 January 1907, priced at £50 in plaster (equivalent to £7,000 in 2024) and £300 in marble (equivalent to £41,700 in 2024). According to The Gentlewoman, a work "of considerable ambition and excellent workmanship".
Black and white photograph of Edith Maryon's sculpture A Poet of Umbria	A Poet of Umbria	1907			
Black and white photograph of Edith Maryon's portrait of Bishop Alfred Tucker	Portrait of Bishop Alfred Tucker	1908 or earlier			
Black and white photograph of Edith Maryon's sculpture The Enchanted Garden	The Enchanted Garden	1908			Exhibited at the Royal Academy of Arts from 4 May to 3 August 1908.
	A future Darwin	1908			Bust. Exhibited at the Royal Academy of Arts from 4 May to 3 August 1908.
Black and white photograph of Edith Maryon's sculpture The Passing of Winter	The Passing of Winter—Miss Maud Allan as Spring	1909			Plaster group. Exhibited at the Forty-first Autumn Exhibition at the Walker Art Gallery from 23 September 1911 to 6 January 1912, priced at £200 (equivalent to £27,800 in 2024).
Colour photograph of Edith Maryon's sculpture The Dance of Anitra	The Dance of Anitra	February 1909	53 cm high; 19.5 x 16 cm wide (base)	Private collection	Bronze statuette. Depicts Maud Allan performing Anitra's dance from Act IV of Peer Gynt. Exhibited at the Royal Academy of Arts from 3 May to 2 August 1909, and at the Fortieth Autumn Exhibition at the Walker Art Gallery from 19 September 1910 to 7 January 1911, priced at £12 12s (equivalent to £1,800 in 2024). Auctioned for £4,200 in 2025, attributed to a private collection in Wiltshire.
Black and white photograph of Edith Maryon's sculpture To the Witches' Revels	To the Witches' Revels	1909	37 cm high	Private collection	Patinated bronze, signed and dated in the cast. Exhibited at the Fortieth Autumn Exhibition at the Walker Art Gallery from 19 September 1910 to 7 January 1911, priced at £15 15s (equivalent to £2,200 in 2024). Auctioned for £3,400 in 2015 (equivalent to £4,500 in 2024).
	Psyche	1909	43 cm high	Private collection	Bronze statuette. Exhibited in plaster at the Thirty-ninth Autumn Exhibition at the Walker Art Gallery from 20 September 1909 to 8 January 1910, with bronze version, which sold during the exhibition, priced at £12 12s (equivalent to £1,800 in 2024). Exhibited at the Royal Academy of Arts from 2 May to 6 August 1910. Auctioned by Christie's in 1993 with an estimate of £1,000–1,500 (equivalent to £2000–3000 in 2024), but was bought in. Sold by Tennants in 2004 for £850 (equivalent to £1,400 in 2024), against an estimate of £300–500 (equivalent to £500–800 in 2024).
	The Order of the Bath	1909			Exhibited in plaster at the Thirty-ninth Autumn Exhibition at the Walker Art Gallery from 20 September 1909 to 8 January 1910, with bronze version priced at £2 2s (equivalent to £300 in 2024).
	Miss Ruth Franklin	1910			Statuette. Exhibited at the Fortieth Autumn Exhibition at the Walker Art Gallery from 19 September 1910 to 7 January 1911, priced at £10 10s (equivalent to £1,500 in 2024).
Colour photograph of a bronze figurine of an infant by Edith Maryon	Meditation	1910	8 cm high	Private collection	Bronze. Exhibited at the Fortieth Autumn Exhibition at the Walker Art Gallery from 19 September 1910 to 7 January 1911, priced at 10s 10d (equivalent to £100 in 2024). Sold by East Bristol Auctions in February 2019. A version in gilt plaster purchased by William Lever, 1st Viscount Leverhulme and displayed at the Lady Lever Art Gallery, but no longer part of the collection.
	Fairy Luck	1910	7.5 cm high		Versions in bronze and gilt plaster. Bronze version exhibited at the Fortieth Autumn Exhibition at the Walker Art Gallery from 19 September 1910 to 7 January 1911, priced at 10s 10d (equivalent to £100 in 2024), and sold during the exhibition. Gilt-plaster version purchased by William Lever, 1st Viscount Leverhulme and displayed at the Lady Lever Art Gallery, but no longer part of the collection.
Black and white photograph of Edith Maryon's sculpture Priestess of Isis	Priestess of Isis, Sistrum Lady of Isis, Nekhta Aukh	1911			Exhibited at the Royal Academy of Arts from 1 May to 7 August 1911. Exhibited in plaster at the Forty-first Autumn Exhibition at the Walker Art Gallery from 23 September 1911 to 6 January 1912, priced at £50 (equivalent to £7,000 in 2024).
Black and white photograph of Edith Maryon's sculpture The Priest	The Priest	1911			
	Echo	1911	29.8 cm high; 33.7 cm wide (plinth)	Walker Art Gallery	Bronze statuette. Exhibited at the Royal Academy of Arts from 1 May to 7 August 1911. Exhibited at the Forty-first Autumn Exhibition at the Walker Art Gallery from 23 September 1911 to 6 January 1912, priced at £10 10s (equivalent to £1,500 in 2024). Purchased at the close of the exhibition by the Walker Art Gallery for its permanent collection.
Black and white photograph of Edith Maryon's sculpture The seeker of Divine wisdom	The seeker of Divine wisdom	1912			Exhibited at the Royal Academy of Arts from 6 May to 5 August 1912, with the catalogue including the line "The seeker kneels before Wisdom; behind him stand Religion, Knowledge, Purity, Change; on the left side Natural Law or Science, Love, Inspiration or Prayer; seated figures Contemplation or Research."
	The Skylark	1912			Oxydised silver-plated. Exhibited at the Forty-second Autumn Exhibition at the Walker Art Gallery from 5 October 1912 to 4 January 1913, priced at £2 2s (equivalent to £300 in 2024).
	Die Spröde	1919			Castings offered for sale by the Ita Wegman Institut.
Color photograph of Edith Maryon's relief In Memory of Theo Faiss	In Memory of Theo Faiss	1921	71.5 cm (version 1) or 67 cm (version 2) high; 33.5 cm wide	Private collections	Relief in plaster and bronze. Two versions made. Memorial to Theo Faiss.
	Nude relief		860mm high; 560mm wide; 35mm deep; 13.6 kg	destroyed	Sold on eBay on 11 October 2021 for £111; destroyed by Parcelforce.
	Plaster casts of eurythmy figures			Private collection	

== Bibliography ==
- "The Art Movement. The National Competitions: Prize Works". The Magazine of Art: 37–40. 1901.
- Autumn Catalogue Sale. Leyburn, North Yorkshire: Tennants. 2004. OCLC 1552801646.
- Bare, Henry Bloomfield (January 1911a). "Studio Talk: Liverpool". The Studio. LI (214): 231–232.
- Bare, Henry Bloomfield (January 1911b). "Studio Talk: Liverpool". The International Studio. XVII (167): 231–232.
- Beattie, Susan (1983). The New Sculpture. New Haven: Yale University Press. ISBN 0-300-02860-1.
- Benn, R. Davis (November 1899). "Le Concours National d'Art en Angleterre" [The National Art Competition in England]. Art et Décoration (in French). 3 (11): 146–150.
- Billcliffe, Roger (1992). The Royal Glasgow Institute of the Fine Arts 1861–1989: A Dictionary of Exhibitors at the Annual Exhibitions of the Royal Glasgow Institute of the Fine Arts. Vol. 3. Glasgow: The Woodend Press. ISBN 0-9515945-2-4.
- "British Sculpture, in 1903, Technically Considered". The Magazine of Art. 1: 436–440. 1903.
- Catalogue of the Sixth Exhibition. London: Arts & Crafts Exhibition Society. 1899.
- Clay, Andrew; Morris, Edward; Penketh, Sandra & Stevens, Timothy (1999). "British Sculpture acquired by W.H. lever but not now in the Lady Lever Art Gallery". British Sculpture in the Lady Lever Art Gallery. Liverpool: Board of Trustees of the National Museums and Galleries on Merseyside. p. 81. ISBN 0-906367-98-0.
- Faldey, Mirela (Easter 2011). "Fruitful Thoughts: Edith Maryon" (PDF). Newsletter from the Section for the Arts of Eurythmy, Speech and Music. Dornach: Goetheanum Section for the Performing Arts: 19–22.
- Faxneld, Per (2017). "Witches as Rebels against Patriarchy". Satanic Feminism: Lucifer as the Liberator of Woman in Nineteenth-Century Culture. Oxford Studies in Western Esotericism. London: Ocford University Press. pp. 197–250. ISBN 978-0-19-066447-3.
- "The Field of Art: Women Artists at the Royal Academy". Supplement. The Ladies' Field. Vol. XI, no. 166. 18 May 1901. pp. 7–11.
- Forrer, Leonard (1907). Biographical Dictionary of Medallists. Vol. III. London: Spink & Son.
- Forrer, Leonard (1930). Biographical Dictionary of Medallists. Vol. VIII. London: Spink & Son.
- G., R. C. (15 September 1900). "Jottings on Art". The Ladies' Field. Vol. XI, no. 131. pp. 25–26.
- Graves, Algernon (1906). The Royal Academy of Arts: A Complete Dictionary of Contributors and their Work from its Foundation in 1769 to 1904. Vol. V. London: Henry Graves and Co. Ltd.
- International Exhibition Glasgow, 1901: Official Catalogue of the Fine Art Section. Glasgow: Chas. P. Watson. 1901.
- K., H. W. R. (1900–1901). "The South Kensington Sketch Club Holiday Competition". The Artist: An Illustrated Monthly Record of Arts, Crafts and Industries. XXIX. New York: Truslove, Hanson & Comba: 192–196.
- Koch, Alex, ed. (December 1901). "Sculptures". Academy Architecture. 20 (2): 73–88.
- Koch, Alex, ed. (June 1904). "Sculptures". Academy Architecture. 25 (1): 117–132.
- Koch, Alex, ed. (1908). Sculptures from "Academy Architecture," 1904–1908. London: Academy Architecture.
- Koch, Alex, ed. (June 1909). "Sculptures". Academy Architecture. 35 (1): 81–96.
- Koch, Alex, ed. (1912). Sculptures from "Academy Architecture," 1909–1912. London: Academy Architecture.
- "National Competition of Schools of Art and Art Classes, 1900". The Artist: An Illustrated Monthly Record of Arts, Crafts and Industries. XXIX. New York: Truslove, Hanson & Comba: 74–90. 1900–1901.
- Raab, Rex (1993). Edith Maryon: Bildhauerin und Mitarbeiterin Rudolf Steiners [Edith Maryon: Sculptor and collaborator of Rudolf Steiner]. Pioniere der Anthroposophie (in German). Vol. XI. Dornach: Philosophisch-Anthroposophischer Verlag am Goetheanum. ISBN 3-7235-0648-8.
- "Sculpture at the Royal Academy". The Builder. LXXX (3045): 576–578. 15 June 1901.
- Spielmann, M. H. (1901a). British Sculpture and Sculptors of To-Day. London: Cassell and Company.
- Spielmann, M. H. (1901b). "At the Royal Academy Exhibition, 1901". The Magazine of Art: 499–506.
- Steiner, Rudolf (1990). Donat, Konrad (ed.). Rudolf Steiner / Edith Maryon: Briefwechsel [Rudolf Steiner / Edith Maryon: Correspondence] (PDF). Rudolf Steiner Gesamtausgabe (in German). Vol. 263/1. Dornach: Rudolf Steiner Verlag. ISBN 3-7274-2631-4.
- Steiner, Rudolf & Maryon, Edith (2018). Sam, Martina Maria; Hasler, Stefan & Wendtland, Dino (eds.). Eurythmiefiguren aus der Entstehungszeit. Rudolf Steiner Gesamtausgabe. Vol. K26b. Basel: Rudolf Steiner Verlag. ISBN 978-3-7274-3671-0.
- Tucker, Alfred R. (1908). Eighteen Years in Uganda and East Africa. Vol. I. London: Edwin Arnold.
- Yarrington, Alison (2005). "'Solvitur ambulando': Lord Leverhulme, Sculpture, Collecting and Display". Visual Culture in Britain. 6 (2). Manchester: Manchester University Press: 99–123. ISBN 0-7190-8003-7.

Royal Academy of Arts exhibition catalogues

- The Exhibition of the Royal Academy of Arts. Vol. 132. London: Royal Academy of Arts. 1900.
- The Exhibition of the Royal Academy of Arts. Vol. 133. London: Royal Academy of Arts. 1901.
- The Exhibition of the Royal Academy of Arts. Vol. 134. London: Royal Academy of Arts. 1902.
- The Exhibition of the Royal Academy of Arts. Vol. 135. London: Royal Academy of Arts. 1903.
- The Exhibition of the Royal Academy of Arts. Vol. 136. London: Royal Academy of Arts. 1904.
- The Exhibition of the Royal Academy of Arts. Vol. 137. London: Royal Academy of Arts. 1905.
- The Exhibition of the Royal Academy of Arts. Vol. 138. London: Royal Academy of Arts. 1906.
- The Exhibition of the Royal Academy of Arts. Vol. 140. London: Royal Academy of Arts. 1908.
- The Exhibition of the Royal Academy of Arts. Vol. 141. London: Royal Academy of Arts. 1909.
- The Exhibition of the Royal Academy of Arts. Vol. 142. London: Royal Academy of Arts. 1910.
- The Exhibition of the Royal Academy of Arts. Vol. 143. London: Royal Academy of Arts. 1911.
- The Exhibition of the Royal Academy of Arts. Vol. 144. London: Royal Academy of Arts. 1912.

Walker Gallery Autumn exhibition catalogues

- Thirtieth Autumn Exhibition of Modern Pictures in Oil and Water-colours: Catalogue. Liverpool: Corporation of Liverpool, Walker Art Gallery. 1900. OCLC 22433402.
- Thirty-first Autumn Exhibition of Modern Pictures in Oil and Water-colours: Catalogue. Liverpool: Corporation of Liverpool, Walker Art Gallery. 1901. OCLC 22433402.
- Thirty-third Autumn Exhibition of Pictures & Sculpture. Liverpool: Corporation of Liverpool, Walker Art Gallery. 1903. OCLC 22433402.
- Thirty-fourth Autumn Exhibition of Modern Art. Liverpool: Corporation of Liverpool, Walker Art Gallery. 1904. OCLC 22433402.
- Thirty-fifth Autumn Exhibition of Modern Art: Catalogue. Liverpool: Corporation of Liverpool, Walker Art Gallery. 1905. OCLC 22433402.
- Thirty-sixth Autumn Exhibition of Modern Art: Catalogue. Liverpool: Corporation of Liverpool, Walker Art Gallery. 1906. OCLC 22433402.
- Thirty-ninth Autumn Exhibition of Modern Art: Catalogue (7th ed.). Liverpool: Corporation of Liverpool, Walker Art Gallery. 1909. OCLC 22433402.
- Thirty-ninth Autumn Exhibition of Modern Art: Catalogue (8th ed.). Liverpool: Corporation of Liverpool, Walker Art Gallery. 1909. OCLC 22433402.
- Fortieth Autumn Exhibition of Modern Art: Catalogue (7th ed.). Liverpool: Corporation of Liverpool, Walker Art Gallery. 1910. OCLC 22433402.
- Forty-first Autumn Exhibition of Modern Art: Catalogue (8th ed.). Liverpool: Corporation of Liverpool, Walker Art Gallery. 1911. OCLC 22433402.
- Forty-Second Autumn Exhibition of Modern Art: Catalogue (5th ed.). Liverpool: Corporation of Liverpool, Walker Art Gallery. 1912. OCLC 22433402.
