= May Morning (Maryon) =

1901 relief by Edith Maryon

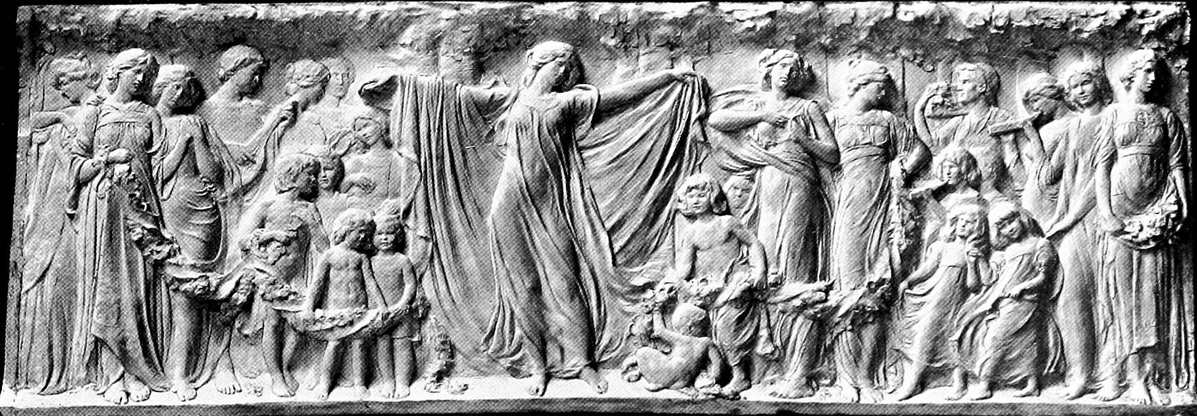
- Artist: Edith Maryon
- Year: 1901
- Medium: Fireplace relief
- Dimensions: 3:1

May Morning is a 1901 relief by the English sculptor Edith Maryon. Intended as a decoration to be placed over a fireplace, it is three times as wide as it is high, and was inspired by William Wordsworth's Ode Composed on a May Morning. The work was exhibited at the Royal Academy of Arts and the Walker Art Gallery in 1901, and widely illustrated in art publications.

The relief belongs to a category of works by Maryon involving references to the elemental world. In her later career, after joining the Anthroposophical Society led by Rudolf Steiner, Maryon created additional reliefs that, like May Morning, display a narrative form.

== Edith Maryon ==
Edith Maryon was born in London on 9 February 1872. She was educated there and in Geneva, then studied art, including at the Royal College of Art; in 1901, one of her teachers there, Édouard Lantéri, termed Maryon and Benjamin Clemens his best students. Between 1899 and 1912, she exhibited numerous works, particularly at the Royal Academy of Arts and the Walker Art Gallery. These works, according to her biographer Rex Raab, usually fell into five categories: first, the world of external physical being; second, references to the elemental world; third, motifs reflecting the human soul; fourth, allegorical works representing spiritual forces and beings; and fifth, a combination of emotional and spiritual aspects. Maryon rarely if ever exhibited after 1912.

In 1912, Maryon travelled to Germany to meet the anthroposophist Rudolf Steiner, and In 1914 she travelled to Dornach—the place where Steiner had resolved to centre the anthroposophical movement and build the Goetheanum as its central structure. Over the next decade, until her death in 1924, Maryon rarely left Dornach. She became a close collaborator of Steiner; among other contributions while there, she was heavily involved in creating both the monumental sculpture The Representative of Humanity, and the eurythmy figures depicting an anthroposophical form of dance.

== Description ==
The relief was intended to function as a decorative element above a fireplace, and is three times as wide as it is high. It is inspired by Ode, Composed on May Morning by William Wordsworth, and the exhibition catalogues quoted four lines from the ode:

When youths and maids
At peep of dawn would rise,
And wander forth, in forest glades
Thy birth to solemnize.

According to Raab, May Morning belongs to the second category of works by Maryon, regarding references to the elemental world. Other examples from this category include The Pixies' Ring, first exhibited in 1906, and The Enchanted Garden, exhibited in 1908. Maryon's reliefs from her time in London, like May Morning, also presage her later anthroposophical reliefs made in Dornach, which similarly share a narrative character.

== Provenance ==
Maryon exhibited May Morning at the Royal Academy of Arts from 6 May to 5 August 1901. She was still studying at the Royal College of Art at the time. Maryon displayed one other work, a portrait medallion, at the exhibition.

The relief was pictured in a June 1901 issue of The Builder, which termed the work a "spirited panel in relief". The photograph was sent by Maryon, the magazine added, and the reproduction "too small unfortunately to do justice to the work". Marion Spielmann also pictured the relief in his 1901 book British Sculpture and Sculptors of Today. In a section on "The Women Sculptors", Spielmann wrote that May Morning and two other works by Maryon—Mother and Child and Religion—"show taste and elegance, and are full of promise". Writing in The Magazine of Art, where the relief was again pictured, he wrote that it was "somewhat ambitious in design, although a little conventional perhaps; it is frankly student's work, but full of cleverness, grace, and distinction, and even fuller of promise, for the lady is working in a good school". The work was also highlighted as "elaborate" in The Ladies' Field, and pictured in the 1901 volume of Academy Architecture.

The following year, Maryon exhibited May Morning at the Thirty-first Autumn Exhibition at the Walker Art Gallery, held from 16 September 1901 to 4 January 1902. The work was priced at £52 10s (equivalent to £7,300 in 2024).

In 1907, Leonard Forrer, quoting Spielmann's review in British Sculpture and Sculptors of Today, included May Morning amongst Edith Maryon's works in his Biographical Dictionary of Medallists. He likewise noted Mother and Child and Religion.

== Bibliography ==
- "The Field of Art: Women Artists at the Royal Academy". Supplement. The Ladies' Field. Vol. XI, no. 166. 18 May 1901. pp. 7–11.
- Forrer, Leonard (1907). Biographical Dictionary of Medallists. Vol. III. London: Spink & Son.
- Graves, Algernon (1906). The Royal Academy of Arts: A Complete Dictionary of Contributors and their Work from its Foundation in 1769 to 1904. Vol. V. London: Henry Graves and Co. Ltd.
- Koch, Alex, ed. (December 1901). "Sculptures". Academy Architecture. 20 (2): 73–88.
- Maryon, John Ernest (1895). Records and Pedigree of the Family of Maryon of Essex and Herts. London: Self-published.
- Raab, Rex (1993). Edith Maryon: Bildhauerin und Mitarbeiterin Rudolf Steiners [Edith Maryon: Sculptor and collaborator of Rudolf Steiner]. Pioniere der Anthroposophie (in German). Vol. XI. Dornach: Philosophisch-Anthroposophischer Verlag am Goetheanum. ISBN 3-7235-0648-8.
- Selg, Peter (2006). Edith Maryon: Rudolf Steiner and die Dornacher Christus-Plastik [Edith Maryon: Rudolf Steiner and the Sculpture of Christ in Dornach]. Studien zu esoterischen Schülern Rudolf Steiners (in German). Vol. 3. Dornach: Verlag am Goetheanum. ISBN 978-3-7235-1286-9.

- Translated into English as Selg, Peter (2022). Edith Maryon: Rudolf Steiner and the Sculpture of Christ in Dornach. Translated by Barton, Matthew. Forest Row: Temple Lodge Publishing. ISBN 978-1-912230-95-2.

- "Sculpture at the Royal Academy". The Builder. LXXX (3045): 576–578. 15 June 1901.
- Spielmann, M. H. (1901a). British Sculpture and Sculptors of To-Day. London: Cassell and Company.
- Spielmann, M. H. (1901b). "At the Royal Academy Exhibition, 1901". The Magazine of Art: 499–506.
- Steiner, Rudolf (1990). Donat, Konrad (ed.). Rudolf Steiner / Edith Maryon: Briefwechsel [Rudolf Steiner / Edith Maryon: Correspondence] (PDF). Rudolf Steiner Gesamtausgabe (in German). Vol. 263/1. Dornach: Rudolf Steiner Verlag. ISBN 3-7274-2631-4.
- Wordsworth, William (1870). "Ode, Composed on May Morning". The Poetical Works of William Wordsworth. Vol. IV. London: E. Moxon, Son, & Co. pp. 272–274. Archived from the original on 14 March 2023.

Royal Academy of Arts exhibition catalogues

- The Exhibition of the Royal Academy of Arts. Vol. 133. London: Royal Academy of Arts. 1901.
- The Exhibition of the Royal Academy of Arts. Vol. 138. London: Royal Academy of Arts. 1906.
- The Exhibition of the Royal Academy of Arts. Vol. 140. London: Royal Academy of Arts. 1908.

Walker Art Gallery Autumn exhibition catalogues

- Thirty-first Autumn Exhibition of Modern Pictures in Oil and Water-colours: Catalogue. Liverpool: Corporation of Liverpool, Walker Art Gallery. 1901. OCLC 22433402.
- Thirty-sixth Autumn Exhibition of Modern Art: Catalogue. Liverpool: Corporation of Liverpool, Walker Art Gallery. 1906. OCLC 22433402.
