= Theo Faiss =

Brazilian boy (1907–1914)

Theodor Faiss
- In 1913, aged about 6
- Born: 1 July 1907; São Paulo or Porto Alegre, Brazil
- Died: 7 October 1914 (aged 7); Dornach, Switzerland
- Cause of death: Overturning of a horse-drawn wagon
- Monuments: In Memory of Theo Faiss
- Movement: Anthroposophy
- Parent(s): Albert and Ida Faiss

Theodor Alberto Faiss ([ˈteːo faɪ̯s]; 1 July 1907 – 7 October 1914) was a boy whose death in Dornach, Switzerland, was frequently invoked by the anthroposophist Rudolf Steiner as having spiritual significance. Faiss was well liked in Dornach, and frequently ran errands; he was killed when, while delivering groceries for Steiner's housekeeper, a horse-drawn wagon overturned on him. Steiner invoked Faiss's death in at least fifteen speeches and lectures thereafter, repeatedly terming it a karmically voluntary sacrifice that provided a protective spiritual sheath for the Goetheanum, the headquarters of the anthroposophical movement. The building nevertheless burned down eight years later, possibly due to arson; anthroposophists have offered several explanations for why this happened despite the protection of Faiss.

Faiss was born in Brazil to German expatriates who ran a plant nursery; the family returned to Europe when he was around four. They had known Steiner before they left and reconnected with him soon after their return, purchasing another nursery next to the Goetheanum. When Faiss's father was called up to fight for Germany in the First World War, Faiss sought to help his mother, including by running errands with a small cart.

Steiner eulogised Faiss at his funeral. In 1921, the English sculptor Edith Maryon, a close collaborator of Steiner, created two versions of a relief titled In Memory of Theo Faiss, and in 1987, the anthroposophist Lex Bos tracked down Faiss's surviving family and published a biography. The relief and biography, wrote Maryon's biographer Rex Raab, constitute the enduring memorials to Faiss.

== Early life ==
Theodor Alberto Faiss was born in São Paulo or Porto Alegre, Brazil, on 1 July 1907. (Note: Some anthroposophists have assigned meaning to Faiss's birth in the Southern Hemisphere. To Lex Bos, "If one imagines that this boy, seven years later—at an age when the etheric body is liberated through the change of teeth—dedicates his etheric body to the building of the Goetheanum, it is not unimportant to consider from what etheric geography he formed this etheric body. On the southern hemisphere the Earth breathes out its etheric body while inhaling it on the northern hemisphere. The yearly festivals proceed in an anticyclical rhythm: Christmas in summer, Easter in autumn, St. John's in winter, Michaelmas in spring." (Wenn man sich vorstellt, daß dieser Knabe 7 Jahre später – in einem Alter, wo der Ätherleib mit dem Zahnwechsel frei wird – seinen Ätherleib dem Goetheanumbau hingibt, ist es nicht unwichtig, zu bedenken, aus welcher Äthergeographie er diesen Ätherleib aufbaute. Auf der südlichen Halbkugel atmet die Erde ihren Ätherleib aus, wenn sie ihn auf der nördlichen Halbkugel einatmet. Die Jahresfeste verlaufen antizyklisch: Weihnachten im Sommer, Ostern im Herbst, Johanni im Winter, Michaeli im Frühling.) Similarly, to Martina Maria Sam, "For his unique destiny, it is surely of deeper significance that he incarnated in Earth's Southern Hemisphere, in a land of strong etheric forces." (Für sein besonderes Schicksal ist sicher von tieferer Bedeutung, dass er sich auf der Südhemisphäre der Erde, in einem Land mit starken Ätherkräften, inkarnierte.)) He was the first of four children born to Albert and Ida Faiss; Maria Magdalena ("Magda," born 1909), Arno (born 1911) and Hansi (March 1914 – 1980) would follow.

Albert and Ida Faiss had lived in Stuttgart in 1904 and knew Rudolf Steiner from that time. Albert Faiss was deeply interested in theosophy, and Ida Faiss likewise joined these circles; Albert's father did not approve, however, which may have been one of the reasons for the move to Brazil. The couple ran a plant nursery in southern Brazil from 1905 to 1911, before giving up and moving back to Europe. Arno was born during the return trip.

The months after the return to Europe were unsettled. Albert Faiss stayed with Theo in Feuerbach, near Stuttgart, working in the family's business; Ida Faiss spent much of her time with her brother's family in Oldenburg. At some point, Albert Faiss reconnected with Steiner's circle. In late 1911 or early 1912 the family moved to Arlesheim, and in the first half of 1913 they moved to Dornach to be near an anthroposophical institute. They continued to farm a plot of land in Arlesheim, where Theo Faiss went to school. In October 1913, they purchased the nursery directly below the grounds of the Goetheanum, which was then under construction.

By October 1914, Faiss—then seven years old—was well liked in Dornach and considered to be responsible. His father Albert had been called up to fight for Germany in the First World War, prompting the younger Faiss to respond, in Steiner's later recollection, that "Now that our father has been called away, I must work especially hard and diligently so I can be a support for my mother". (Note: Jetzt, wo der Vater fort ist, muß ich besonders fleißig arbeiten, damit ich meiner Mutter eine Stütze bin) He would sometimes run errands with a small wooden cart, carrying vegetables and flowers, and Steiner himself would sometimes enlist his help. Also by October, Albert Faiss was either in a military hospital or still at the front, having been slightly wounded by shrapnel there in late September; his wife was informed of the injury by telegram on 5 October.

== Death ==
On the afternoon of 7 October 1914, Steiner's housekeeper asked Faiss to run an errand at a dining hall known as the Kantine, or canteen; (Note: The canteen was located at the corner of Herzentalstraße and Dorneckstraße, directly beneath the grounds of the Goetheanum. It is now known as the Speishaus.) the errand has been variously described as either picking up groceries from the canteen or dropping them off there, as Steiner would frequently receive gifts of food that he did not need. By dusk, Faiss had not returned, and his mother began searching for him. More and more neighbours soon joined the search, although Steiner, who was leading an evening programme—a reading of poems by Christian Morgenstern, a speech, and a lecture—was not alerted until around 10 pm. They soon found that an overloaded wagon carrying the furniture of the artist Käthe Knetsch, who worked on the Goetheanum, had overturned near the canteen; its driver had unharnessed the horses, then walked to Basel. Righting the wagon took until around midnight, when Faiss's body was found underneath. In a letter that Faiss's mother wrote to his father on 9 October, she described the night:

It was a terrible night; at 12 o'clock his body was recovered. It was heartbreaking for everyone; everyone was on their feet, and no one found any rest that night. Dr. Steiner broke the news to me slowly and said that his great spirit had had no room in the small body; I should take comfort, for he had been too good for the earth; everyone, everyone had grown so fond of him, and they will all preserve him in eternal remembrance with his radiant little face. Fräulein von Sivers said that he will be a good support to us in the Building; now he will truly be able to come into his own, since he is free, for he had a great spirit which he could not put to use here in the physical world. (Note: Es war furchtbar die Nacht, um 12 Uhr war sein Leichnam geborgen. Es war herzzerreißend für alle, alles war auf den Beinen, und keiner fand mehr Ruhe die Nacht. Dr. Steiner brachte es mir langsam bei und sagte, sein großer Geist hätte keinen Raum in dem kleinen Körper, ich möchte mich trösten, für die Erde sei er zu gut gewesen, alle alle hätten ihn so lieb gewonnen, und sie werden ihn alle mit seinem strahlenden Gesichtchen in ewigem Andenken bewahren. Fräulein von Sivers sagte, er wird uns eine gute Stütze sein am Bau, jetzt könnte er erst recht aus sich heraus, da er frei ist, denn er hatte einen großen Geist, was er hier im Physischen nicht verwerten konnte.)

Faiss's body was laid out in a corner of the canteen; Steiner visited daily, each time addressing Faiss as "You dear Sun-Boy, you". (Note: Du lieber Sonnenknabe, du) Steiner delivered a eulogy at the funeral, held on 10 October; that evening he gave the first of his five-part lecture series The Dornach Building as a Symbol, during which he again mentioned Faiss. (Note: Der Dornacher Bau als Wahrzeichen)

Albert Faiss was given a week's leave at the end of the month to visit his family. Upon his return to the field in the cold, wet autumn, he contracted pneumonia and rib inflammation; he was taken to the hospital in Konstanz on 18 December, although the post was unreliable and the family was not informed. He died five days later, and Ida Faiss left on Christmas Eve to collect his coffin. Steiner delivered a eulogy on 27 December, stating that the father was "now being welcomed by the soul of the precious child", with whom "we know your soul to be united now". (Note: der Du empfangen wirst von der Seele des teuren Kindes, mit der vereint wir Dich wissen)

== Significance ==
Starting with his eulogy three days after Faiss's death, Steiner repeatedly linked Faiss's death to the anthroposophical movement. The "shocking event", (Note: erschütternden Ereignis) he said then, highlighted "how karma and seemingly external coincidence are connected": (Note: den Zusammenhang zwischen dem Karma und dem scheinbar äußeren Zufall) "When human lives are cut short; when people die prematurely; that is, without having experienced the worries and sorrows or the temptations of life; their souls then become forces in the spiritual world. They have a certain relationship to all human life on earth, and their task is to work on those human lives still on earth". (Note: daß Menschenleben, die früh hinweggenommen werden, die nicht die Sorgen und Bekümmernisse, auch nicht die Versuchungen des Lebens durchgemacht haben, daß solche Menschenleben Kräfte in der geistigen Welt sind, die zu dem gesamten Menschenleben in einer gewissen Beziehung stehen, die da sind, um auf diese menschlichen Leben zu wirken) Steiner closed by reading a mantram, or blessing, adapted from one he read in honour of soldiers.

Mantram to Faiss

Spirit of his soul, active guardian,
May your wings bring
Our souls' imploring love
To the human being in the spheres entrusted to your care,
So that, united with your might,
Our entreaties might ray forth to help
The soul they lovingly seek.

Mantram to Faiss (original German)

Geist seiner Seele, wirkender Wächter,
Deine Schwingen mögen bringen
Unserer Seelen bittende Liebe
Deiner Hut vertrautem Sphärenmenschen,
Daß, mit Deiner Macht geeint,
Unsere Bitte helfend strahle
Der Seele, die sie liebend sucht.

Mantram to soldiers (Note: A translation of the original German was published in Steiner 1987b. It has been adjusted here to more closely align with the translation in Steiner 2011 of the mantram to Faiss.)

Spirits of your souls, active guardians,
May your wings bring
Our souls' imploring love
To the human beings on Earth entrusted to your care,
So that, united with your might,
Our entreaties might ray forth to help
The souls they lovingly seek.

Mantram to soldiers (Original German)

Geister eurer Seelen, wirkende Wächter,
Eure Schwingen mögen bringen
Unserer Seelen bittende Liebe
Eurer Hut vertrauten Erdenmenschen,
Daß, mit eurer Macht geeint,
Unsre Bitte helfend strahle
Den Seelen, die sie liebend sucht.

Similarly, during his evening lecture, Steiner spoke of "a remarkable experience of karma" (Note: merkwürdiges Karma) in which Faiss was "summoned back by spiritual powers", (Note: zurückgefordert wurde von den geistigen Mächten) and added that, however heartrending, "We see clearly that, in order to bring about the fulfillment of this karma, the wagon was led to that spot, and then the wagon was overturned so that the karma of that particular individual might be fulfilled". (Note: um die Verwirklichung dieses Karmas herbeizuführen, an jene Stelle der Wagen hingeführt worden ist, und daß der Wagen umgestürzt ist, um das Karma jenes Menschenlebens zu vollenden)

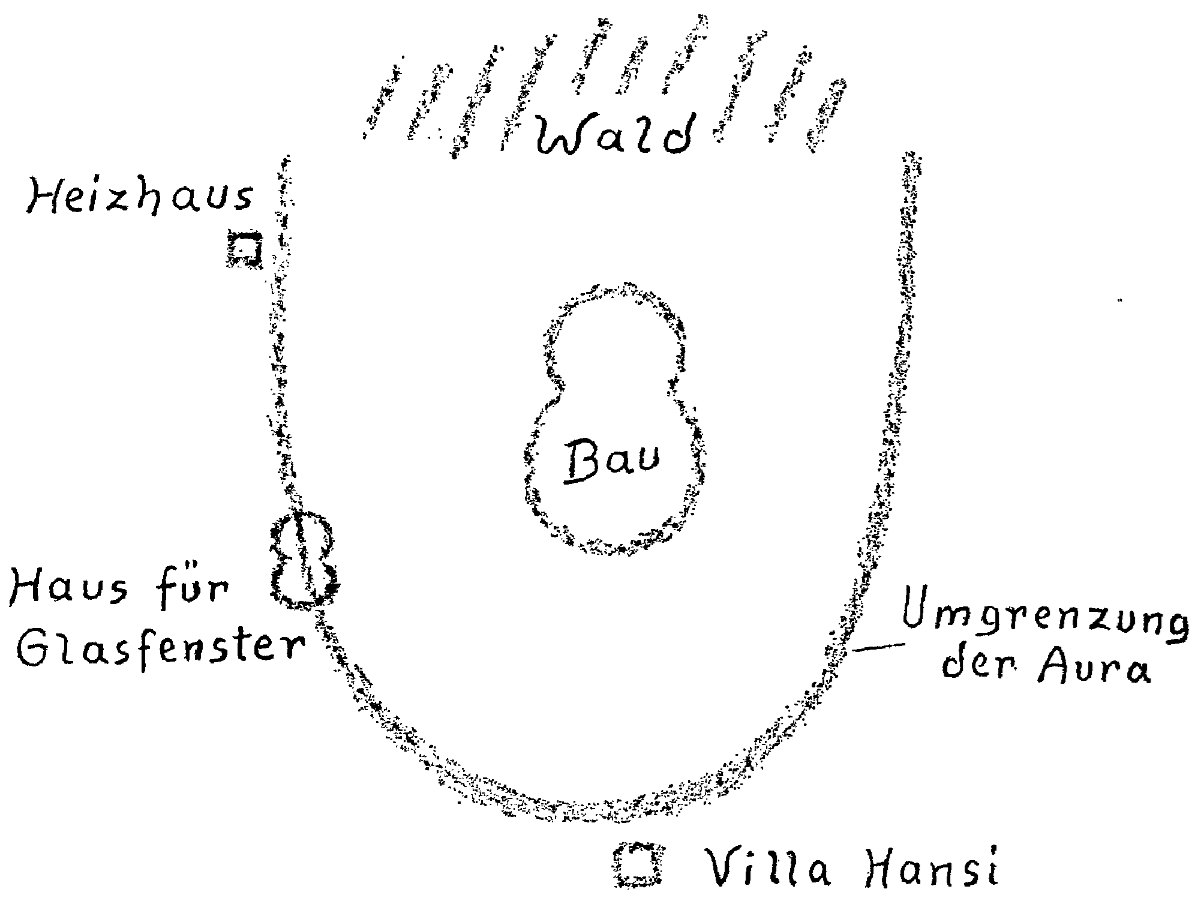
Steiner's drawing showing the boundaries of Faiss's "etherial aura" around the Goetheanum (Note: Bau is the Goetheanum; Heizhaus is the boiler house; Haus für Glasfenster is where the glass windows of the Goetheanum were cut; Villa Hansi is Steiner's house; Wald is the forest; and Umgrenzung der Aura is the boundary of the aura. According to Steiner, "It is possible to determine how widely [the aura] extends. If you see the Dornach building (and those who have already seen it are aware of this), it is a circular building with two cupolas. Here we have a boiler house shaped in a particular way in accordance with spiritual-scientific principles, and here we have another house where the glass windows for the building are cut. I might mention, by the way, that somewhere here is the so-called 'Haus Hansi', where we live. Now it is remarkable that this aura of little Theodor Faill envelops the whole building as far as this spot where the wood begins, then past the boiler house and then, after passing directly through this building where the windows are being cut, passes by Haus Hansi without enclosing it. Thus as one enters the building, one actually steps within this etheric aura." (Es ist möglich, wirklich zu bestimmen, wie weit diese Einhüllung geht. Wenn Sie den Dornacher Bau sehen werden – diejenigen, die ihn schon gesehen haben, wissen es —, es ist ein Doppelrundbau (siehe Zeichnung). Hier haben wir ein Heizhaus, in einer besonderen Art nach Grundsätzen der Geisteswissenschaft angelegt, und hier haben wir dann ein anderes Haus angelegt, wo die Glasfenster für den Bau geschliffen werden. Nur nebenbei will ich erwähnen, daß etwa hier das sogenannte «Haus Hansi» ist – das ist das Haus, in dem wir wohnen. Nun ist es merkwürdig, daß bis hier, gegen den Wald hinauf, dann gerade an dem Heizhaus vorbei, mitten durchschneidend diesen Bau, wo die Fenster geschliffen werden, und hier an diesem Haus vorbei, Haus Hansi, dieses nicht einschließend, diese Aura des kleinen Theodor Faiß einhüllt den ganzen Bau. So daß man in der Tat, wenn man den Bau betritt, diese Ätheraura betritt.))

Steiner continued to invoke Faiss in later years, referring to him in at least fifteen speeches and lectures. (Note: This included the 10 October 1914 eulogy of Theo Faiss; that evening's lecture; the 27 December 1914 eulogy of Albert Faiss; a 6 February 1915 lecture; a 7 February 1915 lecture; a 14 February 1915 lecture; the 19 February 1915 lecture "The Passing of a Human Being through the Gate of Death—a Transformation of Life" (Der Durchgang Des Menschen Durch Die Todespforte – Eine Lebenswandlung); the 22 February 1915 lecture "Personal and Supersensible Aspects (Relating to Certain Individuals)" (Persönlich-Übersinnliches); the 13 March 1915 lecture "The Entry of the Christ Impulse into Historical Events—The Bridging of the Gulf between the Living and the Dead" (Das Eingreifen Des Christus-Impulses in Das Geschichtliche Geschehen – Die Überbrückung Der Kluft Zwischen Lebenden Und Toten); the 7 May 1915 lecture "Cosmic Influences upon the Members of Man's Being – The Occult Foundation of the Christmas Festival – The Significance of Sacrificial Death" (Kosmische Einwirkungen auf die menschlichen Wesensglieder während des Schlafes – Die okkulte Grundlage des Weihnachtsfestes – Der Sinn der Opfertode); the 13 May 1915 lecture "The Relationship of the Human Being to the Realms of Nature and the Hierarchies – Spirits of the Ages and Folk-Souls – The Admonishing Voices of the Dead" (Die Beziehung Des Menschen Zu Den Naturreichen Und Den Hierarchien – Zeitgeister Und Volksgeister – Die Mahnenden Stimmen Der Toten); the 18 May 1915 lecture "Christ in Relation to Lucifer and Ahriman—The Threefold Nature of this Form" (Christus im Verhältnis zu Luzifer und Ahriman – Die dreifache Wesensgestaltung); the 13 June 1915 lecture "Spiritual Science as a Conviction—The Etheric Body as a Reflection of the Universe" (Geisteswissenschaft als Gesinnung – Der Ätherleib als Abspiegelung des Weltenalls); the 16 February 1916 lecture "Life Between Death and Rebirth" (Das Leben Zwischen Tod und Neuer Geburt); and the 18 February 1916 lecture "The Elements of Our Being between Death and Rebirth" (Die Wesensglieder des Menschen im Leben Zwischen Tod und neuer Geburt).) In remarks made in 1915, Steiner expounded upon Faiss's death, explaining it as a karmically voluntary sacrifice that provided a protective spiritual sheath for the Goetheanum, then still under construction. In June, for example, Steiner delivered the twelfth of fifteen lectures in the series The Mystery of Death. (Note: Das Geheimnis des Todes) Steiner declared in the lecture that "since the death of little Theodor Faiss the work has been made possible for me through the mediating forces for inspirations that have been made available by this boy's etheric body which has been enveloping the building". (Note: die Arbeit seit dem Tode dieses kleinen Theodor Faiß mir dadurch möglich gemacht ist, daß Vermittlerkräfte für die Inspirationen in diesem über dem Bau ausgebreiteten Ätherleibe des Knaben gegeben sind) The building, he added, "has been enveloped to quite a wide extent by the enlarged etheric body of this child as by an aura". (Note: von dem vergrößerten Ätherleib dieses Kindes – bis in weitem Umkreis – unser Dornacher Bau wie von einer Aura eingehüllt ist) Steiner made a drawing during the lecture, showing what he understood to be the boundaries of this "etheric aura". (Note: Ätheraura)

=== Fire ===
On the night of New Year's Eve 1922 and into the morning of New Year's Day 1923, the Goetheanum burned to the ground, possibly due to arson. Anthroposophists have offered a variety of interpretations for why it was able to do so, despite the purported protection of Faiss. To Rex Raab, Faiss nevertheless "contributed through his sacrifice to the fact that the building, when it fell prey to the flames and dissolved into the Earth's atmosphere, was able to 'sacrifice' itself in the right way, so as to form, from then on, a special protective sheath for the entire Earth". (Note: durch ihr Opfer dazu beigetragen, daß sich der Bau, als er ein Raub der Flammen wurde und in die Atmosphäre der Erde aufging, sich in der richtigen Art «opfern» konnte, um seither für die ganze Erde eine besondere Schutzhülle zu bilden)

Judith von Halle, by contrast, explains the fire by stating that Faiss's protective sheath had come to an end in October 1921. The interpretation relies on Steiner's belief that humans form and develop in seven-year cycles: forming an etheric body over the first seven years, an astral body from seven to fourteen, and the remainder of one's terrestrial being from fourteen to twenty-one. To von Halle, Faiss's October 1914 death, shortly after his seventh birthday in July, meant that his etheric body had only just become fully formed. In death, as it would have done in life, she states, Faiss's body continued to "age" through his astral cycle, during which time he offered protection to the Goetheanum. In October 1921, therefore—seven years after Faiss died—von Halle concludes that he passed to the next cycle, and the protection ended.

== Legacy ==
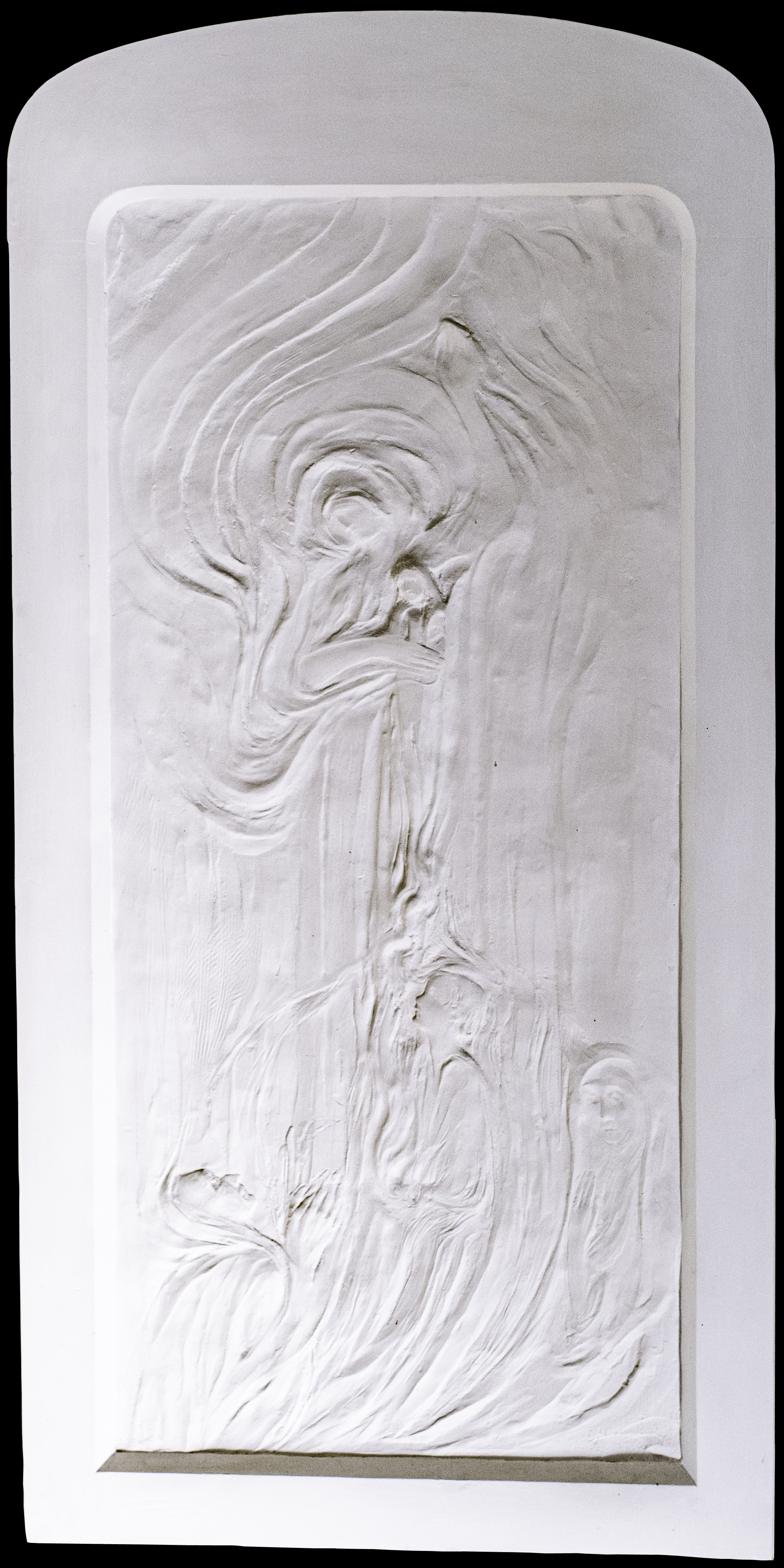
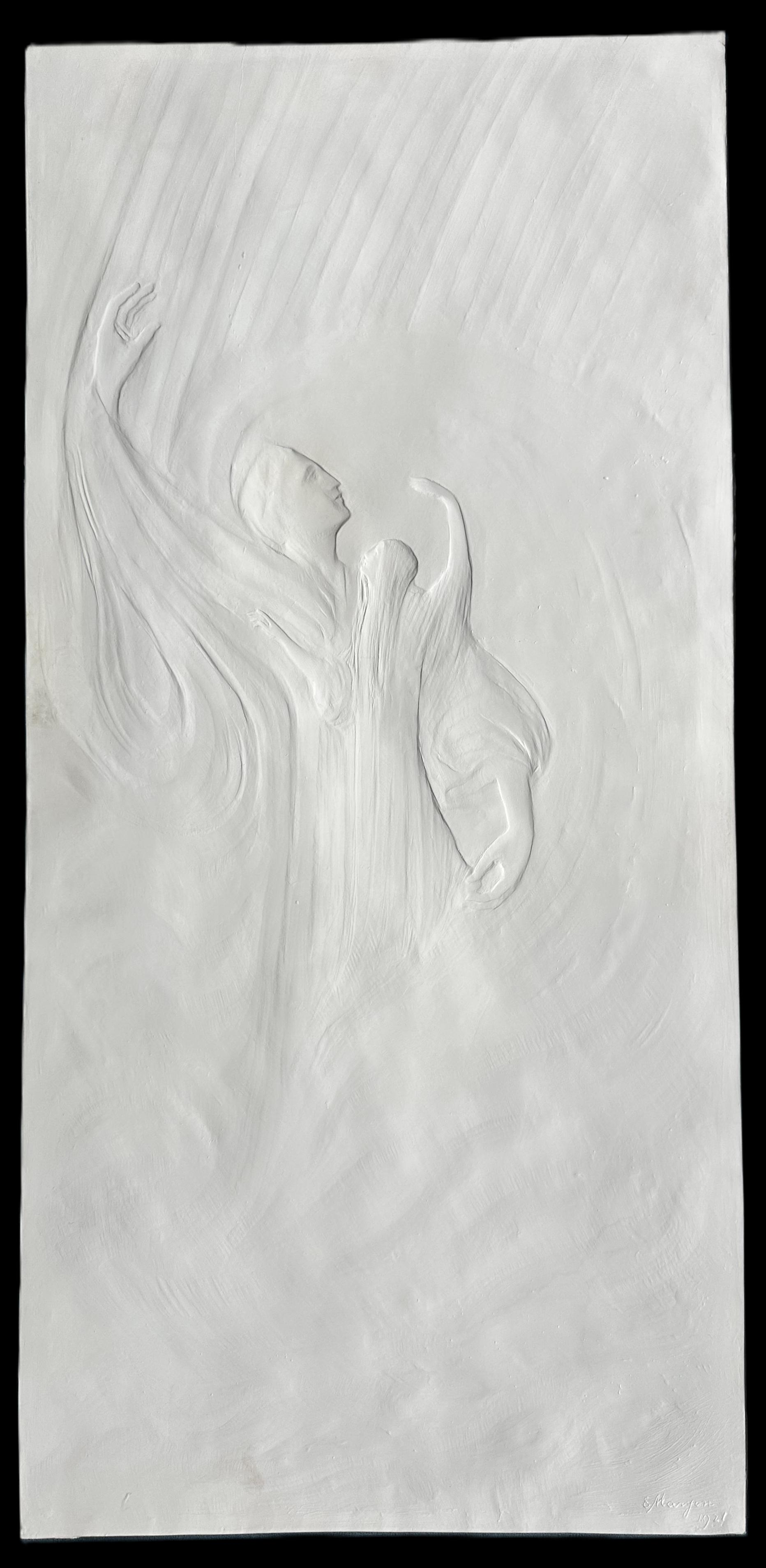
In Memory of Theo Faiss (versions 1 & 2) by Edith Maryon

In 1921, Edith Maryon, an English sculptor and close collaborator of Steiner, created two versions of a relief titled In Memory of Theo Faiss. Both depict a guardian-angel figure carrying the spiritual form of Faiss upwards. The first version includes three additional figures at the bottom: Faiss (this time in physical rather than spiritual form), his mother, and a man variously interpreted as Faiss's father or Steiner. In his 1993 biography of Maryon, Raab terms the work the "true monument" (Note: eigentliche Denkmal) to Faiss. In the light of what Raab describes as a strange omission of Faiss from anthroposophical reference works, he also ascribes a documentary value to Maryon's work.

In 1987, the anthroposophist Lex Bos tracked down Faiss's surviving family and published a biography. Bos wrote that most readers of the anthroposophical journal in which it was published, though not all, were already familiar with the story. To Raab, the biography constituted "the second monument" to Faiss. (Note: Das zweite Denkmal)

== Notes ==
Notes

Original German text

== Bibliography ==
- Bos, Lex (1987). "Theo Faiss". Mitteilungen aus der Anthroposophischen Arbeit in Deutschland [Bulletin of Anthroposophical Work in Germany] (in German). 41 (3): 203–210. OCLC 314150112.
- Kottmann-Solinger, Beatriz & Wanner-Faiss, Raphaela (February 2011). "Rudolf Steiner im Umkreis der Familie Faiss" [Rudolf Steiner in the Circle of the Faiss Family] (PDF). Der Europäer (in German). 15 (4): 3–8.
- Lindenberg, Christoph (1988). Rudolf Steiner: Eine Chronik, 1861–1925 [Rudolf Steiner: A Chrinicle, 1861–1925] (in German). Stuttgart: Verlag Freies Geistesleben GmbH. ISBN 3-7725-0905-3.
- Paull, John (2023). "Dornach: In the Footsteps of Rudolf Steiner". Studies in Art and Architecture. 2 (4): 1–11. doi:10.56397/SAA.2023.12.01.
- Paull, John (2018). "The Home of Rudolf Steiner: Haus Hansi". Journal of Biodynamics Tasmania (126): 19–23.
- Petersen, Adelheid (2001). "Dornach in den Jahren 1914/1915" [Dornach in the Years 1914/1915]. In Beltle, Erika & Vierl, Kurt (eds.). Erinnerungen an Rudolf Steiner. Gesammelte Beiträge aus den "Mitteilungen aus der Anthroposophischen Arbeit in Deutschland" 1947–1978 [Memories of Rudolf Steiner: Collected Contributions from 'Communications from the Anthroposophical Work in Germany' 1947–1978] (in German) (New ed.). Stuttgart: Verlag Freies Geistesleben. pp. 184–196. ISBN 3-7725-1979-2.
- Raab, Rex (1993). Edith Maryon: Bildhauerin und Mitarbeiterin Rudolf Steiners [Edith Maryon: Sculptor and collaborator of Rudolf Steiner]. Pioniere der Anthroposophie (in German). Vol. XI. Dornach: Philosophisch-Anthroposophischer Verlag am Goetheanum. ISBN 3-7235-0648-8.
- Sam, Martina Maria (29 June 2007). "Theo Faiss und das Erste Goetheanum" [Theo Faiss and the First Goetheanum]. Das Goetheanum (in German). 86 (26): 8–10. LCCN 51016931.
- Selg, Peter (2008). Rudolf Steiners Toten-Gedenken [Rudolf Steiner's Commemoration of the Dead] (in German). Arlesheim: Verlag des Ita Wegman Instituts. ISBN 978-3-9523425-2-7.

- Translated into English as Selg, Peter (2011). The Path of the Soul After Death. Translated by Creeger, Catherine E. Great Barrington, Massachusetts: SteinerBooks. ISBN 978-0-88010-724-2.

- Steiner, Rudolf (1980). Groddeck, Wolfram (ed.). Das Geheimnis des Todes: Wesen und Bedeutung Mitteleuropas und die europäischen Volksgeister [The Mystery of Death: The Nature and Significance of Central Europe and the European Folk-Spirits]. Rudolf Steiner Gesamtausgabe (in German). Vol. 159/160 (2nd ed.). Dornach: Rudolf Steiner Verlag. ISBN 3-7274-1590-8.

- Translated into English as Steiner, Rudolf (2023). Dietler, Urs (ed.). The Mystery of Death: The Nature and Significance of Central Europe and the European Folk-Spirits. Collected Works of Rudolf Steiner. Vol. 159. Translated by Blaxland de-Lange, Simon. London: Rudolf Steiner Press. ISBN 978-1-85584-608-1.
- Published online in part with translations as "The Mystery of Death: GA 159". Rudolf Steiner Archive. Steiner Online Library.

- Steiner, Rudolf (1981). Leinhas, Emil; Wiesberger, Hella & Wispier, Caroline (eds.). Menschenschicksale und Völkerschicksale: Vierzehn Vorträge, gehalten in Berlin vom 1. September 1914 bis 6. Juli 1915 [The Destinies of Individuals and of Nations: Fourteen lectures, given in Berlin from 1 September 1914 to 6 July 1915]. Rudolf Steiner Gesamtausgabe (in German). Vol. 157 (3rd ed.). Dornach: Rudolf Steiner Verlag. ISBN 3-7274-1571-1.

- Translated into English as Steiner, Rudolf (1987b). Leinhas, Emil; Wiesberger, Hella & Wispier, Caroline (eds.). The Destinies of Individuals and of Nations: A course of fourteen lectures given in Berlin from 1 September 1914 to 6 July 1915. Collected Works of Rudolf Steiner. Vol. 157. Translated by Meuss, Anna R. London: Rudolf Steiner Press. ISBN 0-85440-556-9.
  - ISBN incorrectly printed as ISBN 0-85440-555-9
- Published online in part with translations as "Human Destinies and the Destinies of Nations: GA 157". Rudolf Steiner Archive. Steiner Online Library.

- Steiner, Rudolf (1983). Wiesberger, Hella & Zbinden, Hans Werner (eds.). Die Erkenntnis des Übersinnlichen in unserer Zeit und deren Bedeutung für das heutige Leben [Recognizing the Supersensible in Our Time and Its Significance for Modern Life]. Rudolf Steiner Gesamtausgabe (in German). Vol. 55 (2nd ed.). Dornach: Rudolf Steiner Verlag. ISBN 3-7274-0550-3.

- Translated into English as Steiner, Rudolf (1987). Supersensible Knowledge. Collected Works of Rudolf Steiner. Vol. 55. Translated by Stebbing, Rita. London: Rudolf Steiner Press. ISBN 0-85440-255-1.
- Published online in part with translations as "Recognizing the Supernatural in our Time and its Significance for Modern Life: GA 55". Rudolf Steiner Archive. Steiner Online Library.

- Steiner, Rudolf (1984). Froböse, Edwin & Jenny, Paul (eds.). Unsere Toten: Ansprachen, Gedenkworte und Meditationssprüche 1906–1924 [Our Dead: Addresses, Memorial Words, and Meditative Sayings 1906–1924] (PDF). Rudolf Steiner Gesamtausgabe (in German). Vol. 261 (2nd ed.). Dornach: Rudolf Steiner Verlag. ISBN 3-7274-2610-1.

- Translated into English as Steiner, Rudolf (2011). Our Dead: Memorial, Funeral, And Cremation Addresses 1906–1924. Collected Works of Rudolf Steiner. Vol. 261. Translated by Seiler, Sabine & Bamford, Christopher. Great Barrington, Massachusetts: SteinerBooks. ISBN 978-0-88010-650-4.
- Published online in part with translations as "Our Dead: GA 261". Rudolf Steiner Archive. Steiner Online Library.

- Steiner, Rudolf (1985). Trapp, Ulla & Oling, G. (eds.). Der Dornacher Bau als Wahrzeichen geschichtlichen Werdens und künstlerischer Umwandlungsimpulse [The Dornach Building as a Symbol of Historical Development and Artistic Transformation]. Rudolf Steiner Gesamtausgabe (in German). Vol. 287 (2nd ed.). Dornach: Rudolf Steiner Verlag. ISBN 3-7274-2870-8.

- Translated into English as Steiner, Rudolf (2017a). Architecture as Peacework: The First Goetheanum, Dornach, 1914. Collected Works of Rudolf Steiner. Vol. 287. Translated by Amrine, Frederick. Great Barrington, Massachusetts: SteinerBooks. ISBN 978-1-62148-099-0.
- Published online in part with translations as "The Building at Dornach: GA 287". Rudolf Steiner Archive. Steiner Online Library.

- Steiner, Rudolf (1987a). Waeger, Johann (ed.). Lucifer–Gnosis, 1903–1908: Grundlegende Aufsätze zur Anthroposophie und Berichte [Lucifer–Gnosis, 1903–1908: Foundational Essays on Anthroposophy and Reports]. Rudolf Steiner Gesamtausgabe (in German). Vol. 34 (2nd ed.). Dornach: Rudolf Steiner Verlag. ISBN 3-7274-0340-3.

- Published online in part with translations as "Essays on Anthroposophy from the Journals Lucifer and Lucifer–Gnosis, 1903-1908: GA 34". Rudolf Steiner Archive. Steiner Online Library.

- Steiner, Rudolf (1994). von Wartburg, Helmut & Friedenthal, Robert (eds.). Die geistigen Hintergründe des Ersten Weltkrieges: Kosmische und menschliche Geschichte [The Spiritual Background to the First World War: Cosmic and Human History]. Rudolf Steiner Gesamtausgabe (in German). Vol. 174b (2nd ed.). Dornach: Rudolf Steiner Verlag. ISBN 3-7274-1742-0.

- Translated into English as Steiner, Rudolf (2024). The Spiritual Background to the First World War. Collected Works of Rudolf Steiner. Vol. 174b. Translated by Blaxland de-Lange, Simon. London: Rudolf Steiner Press. ISBN 978-1-85584-661-6.
- Published online in part with translations as "GA 174b". Rudolf Steiner Archive. Steiner Online Library.

- Steiner, Rudolf (1995). Friedenthal, Robert & Waeger, Johann (eds.). Die Verbindung zwischen Lebenden und Toten: Acht Vorträge, gehalten in verschiedenen Städten zwischen dem 16. Februar und 3. Dezember 1916 [The Connection Between the Living and the Dead: Eight Lectures Given in Various Cities Between February 16 and December 3, 1916]. Rudolf Steiner Gesamtausgabe (in German). Vol. 168. Dornach: Rudolf Steiner Verlag. ISBN 3-7274-1680-7.

- Translated into English as Steiner, Rudolf (2017b). The Connection Between the Living and the Dead: Eight Lectures Held in Various Cities Between February 16 and December 3, 1916. Collected Works of Rudolf Steiner. Vol. 168. Translated by Jackson, Aria. Great Barrington, Massachusetts: SteinerBooks. ISBN 978-1-62148-075-4.
- Published online in part with translations as "The Connection Between the Living and the Dead: GA 168". Rudolf Steiner Archive. Steiner Online Library.

- Steiner, Rudolf (1999). von Wartburg, Helmut (ed.). Wege der geistigen Erkenntnis und der Erneuerung künstlerischer Weltanschauung [Paths to Spiritual Insight and the Renewal of an Artistic Worldview]. Rudolf Steiner Gesamtausgabe (in German). Vol. 161 (2nd ed.). Dornach: Rudolf Steiner Verlag. ISBN 3-7274-1610-6.

- Translated into English as Steiner, Rudolf (2018). Artistic Sensitivity as a Spiritual Approach to Knowing Life and the World. Collected Works of Rudolf Steiner. Vol. 161. Translated by Bradley, Rory. Great Barrington, Massachusetts: SteinerBooks. ISBN 978-1-62148-177-5.
- Published online in part with translations as "Paths to Spiritual Insight and the Renewal of an Artistic Worldview: GA 161". Rudolf Steiner Archive. Steiner Online Library.

- von Halle, Judith (2010). Die Christus-Begegnung der Gegenwart und der Geist des Goetheanum [Encountering Christ Today and the Spirit of the Goetheanum] (in German). Dornach: Verlag für Anthroposophie. ISBN 978-3-03769-026-0.

- Translated into Italian, with chapter available online, as von Halle, Judith (2011a). "Theo Faiss e la protezione sacrificale della dimora dei Misteri" [Theo Faiss and the sacrificial protection of the dwelling of the Mysteries]. L'incontrare il Cristo oggi e lo spirito del Goetheanum [Encountering Christ Today and the Spirit of the Goetheanum] (in Italian). Translated by Cammerinesi, Piero. San Lazzaro di Savena: Editrice Cambiamenti. pp. 77–86. ISBN 978-88-96029-12-1 – via Scribd.

- von Halle, Judith (October 2011b). "L'incontro con il Cristo nel presente: e lo spirito del Goetheanum" [The Encounter with Christ in the Present: and the Spirit of the Goetheanum] (PDF). L'Archetipo (in Italian). XVI (10). Translated by Cammerines, Piero: 23–26.
- von Halle, Judith (November 2011c). "L'incontro con il Cristo nel presente: e lo spirito del Goetheanum" [The Encounter with Christ in the Present: and the Spirit of the Goetheanum] (PDF). L'Archetipo (in Italian). XVI (11). Translated by Cammerines, Piero: 16–21.
