= In Memory of Theo Faiss =

1921 reliefs by Edith Maryon

- Im Gedenken an Theo Faiss (German)
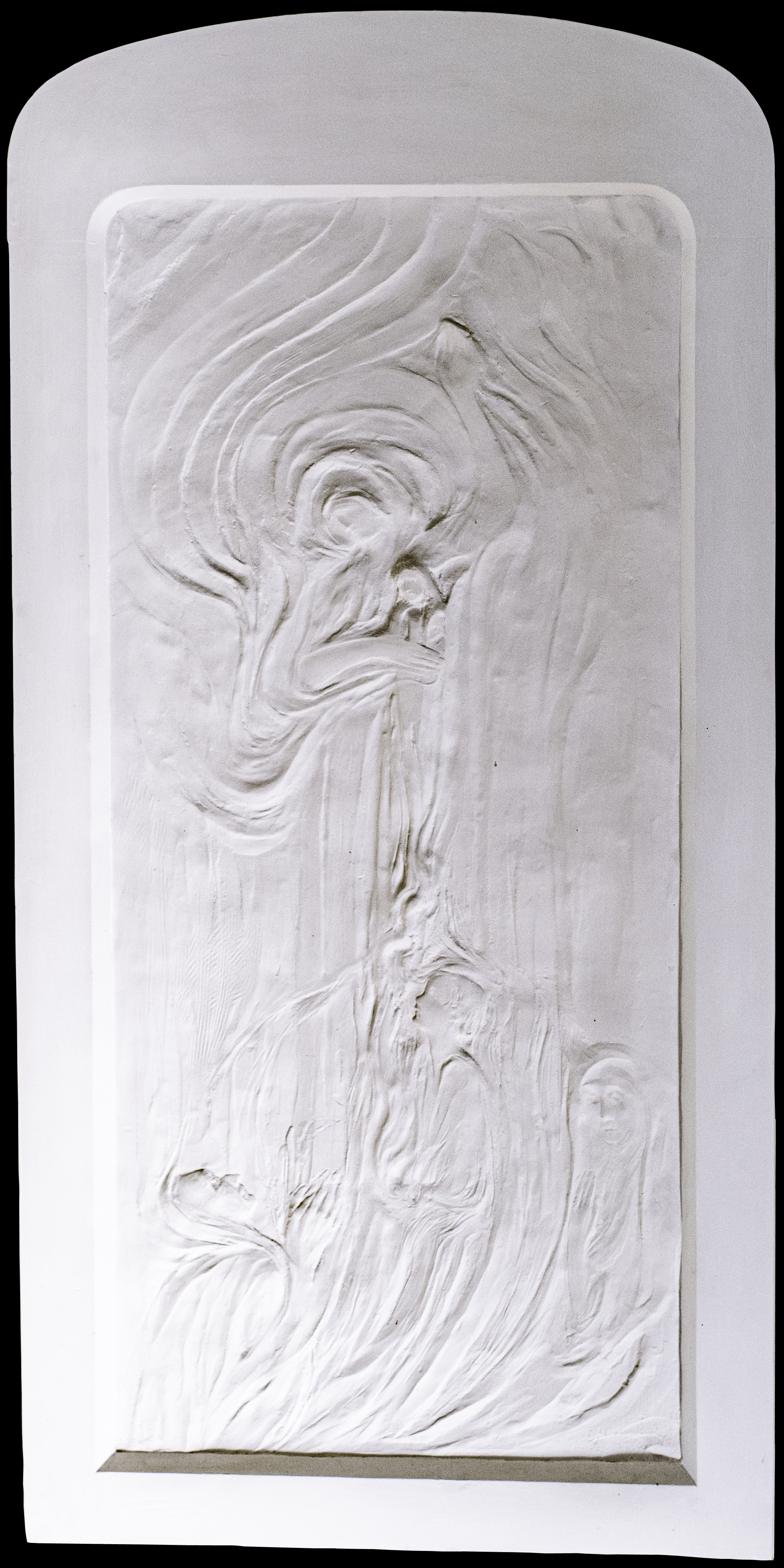
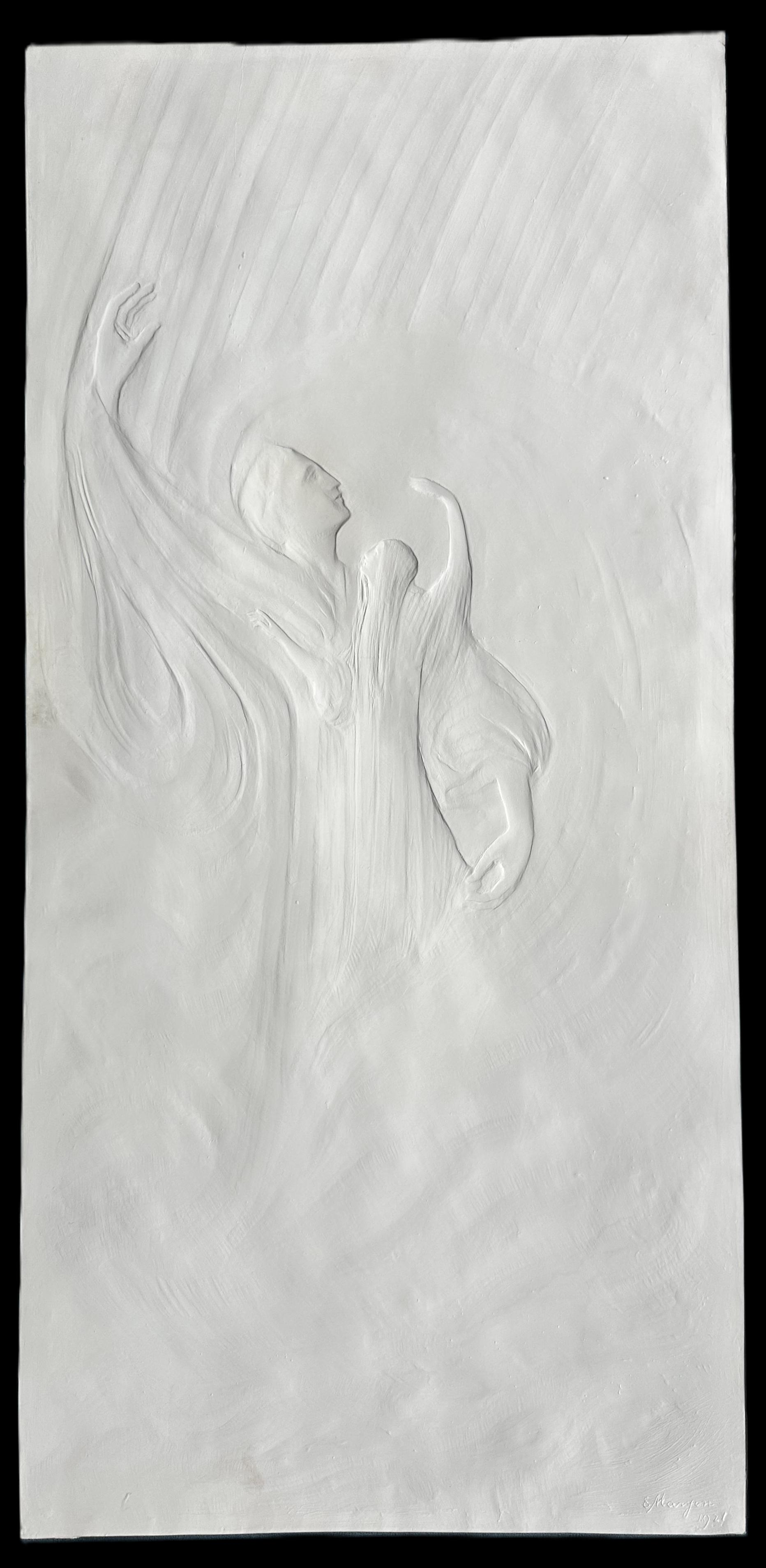
- Versions 1 & 2 in plaster
- Artist: Edith Maryon
- Year: 1921
- Medium: Relief in plaster and bronze
- Dimensions: Version 1: 71.5 cm × 33.5 cm (28.1 in × 13.2 in); Version 2: 67 cm × 33.5 cm (26.4 in × 13.2 in)

In Memory of Theo Faiss (German: Im Gedenken an Theo Faiss) is the name of two related 1921 reliefs by the English sculptor Edith Maryon. A close associate of Anthroposophical Society leader Rudolf Steiner, Maryon made the work to commemorate the seven-year-old Theo Faiss, who was killed by an overturned horse-drawn wagon in 1914. Faiss had been well liked by the community in Dornach, Switzerland—the centre of Steiner's spiritual movement and the place where the Society was building the Goetheanum, a structure designed by Steiner, as its headquarters. In the years afterwards, Steiner frequently invoked Faiss's death, terming it a voluntary sacrifice that enveloped the Goetheanum with a protective spiritual sheath.

Maryon made two versions of the relief; both were cast in plaster, and at least the second was also cast in bronze. Both versions are approximately two feet tall and one foot wide. The central motif in each shows a guardian angel figure cradling the spirit of Faiss in one arm, with the other arm reaching upwards to higher realms. The first version—as determined based on stylistic features—also includes three figures at the bottom of the relief: Faiss (in corporeal rather than spiritual form), his mother, and, depending on interpretation, either his father or Steiner. In the second version, the bottom area is blank. The first version was nearly lost; discovered in 13 fragments, it was reassembled around 1965, after which a new cast was made. Maryon's biographer Rex Raab was unaware of the second version until April 1991, when he learned of a bronze one in the Netherlands whose provenance was unknown.

Two interpretations of the reliefs have been suggested. In one—posited by Raab—they depict the moment of Faiss's sacrificial death. In the other—put forth by the anthroposophist and author Judith von Halle and Steiner scholar Martina Maria Sam—they depict a moment seven years later, when, according to anthroposophical belief, Faiss's spiritual protection over the Goetheanum came to its end. The work is, to Raab, the "true monument" to Faiss and his death, serving a dual role as a "living memento mori"—a work that keeps the memory of Faiss alive while evoking mortality.

== Background ==
=== Edith Maryon ===
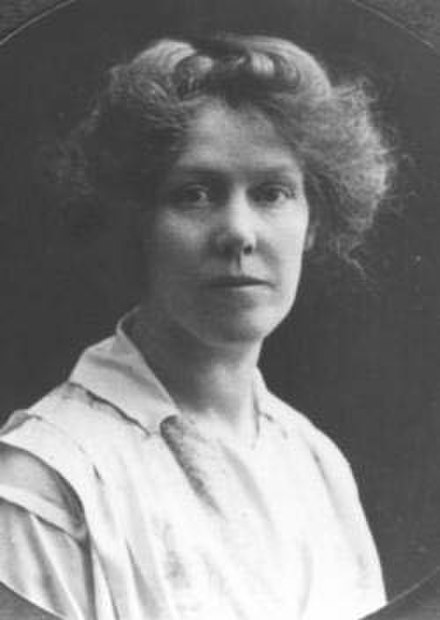
Edith Maryon

Edith Maryon was born in London on 9 February 1872. Educated there and in Geneva, she later studied at institutions including the Royal College of Art. Between 1899 and 1912, when living in London, Maryon exhibited numerous works, particularly at the Royal Academy of Arts and the Walker Art Gallery.

Maryon began exploring occult beliefs at least as early as 1909, and in 1912 travelled to Germany to meet Rudolf Steiner, the founder of anthroposophy—a spiritual movement with roots in German idealist philosophy and theosophy. In January 1914, she travelled to Dornach, Switzerland, where Steiner had resolved to centre the anthroposophical movement and build the Goetheanum as its headquarters. After a brief return to London in April, Maryon came back to Dornach around June or July. From then until her death in 1924, Maryon rarely left. She became a close collaborator of Steiner; among other contributions, she was heavily involved in creating both the monumental sculpture The Representative of Humanity, and the eurythmy figures depicting an anthroposophical form of movement art.

=== Theo Faiss ===
Spirit of his soul, active guardian,
May your wings bring
Our souls' imploring love
To the human being in the spheres entrusted to your care,
So that, united with your might,
Our entreaties might ray forth to help
The soul they lovingly seek.

— Rudolf Steiner, Mantram to Faiss (Note: Geist seiner Seele, wirkender Wächter, Deine Schwingen mögen bringen Unserer Seelen bittende Liebe Deiner Hut vertrautem Sphärenmenschen, Daß, mit Deiner Macht geeint, Unsere Bitte helfend strahle Der Seele, die sie liebend sucht.)

Theo Faiss was born in Brazil on 1 July 1907. He was the first of four children of Albert and Ida Faiss. The parents had lived in Stuttgart, Germany, in 1904 and knew Steiner from that time; after a stint in southern Brazil from 1905 to 1911, they returned to Europe. In the first half of 1913 they settled in Dornach to be near an anthroposophical institute.

By October 1914, Faiss, then seven years old, was well liked and considered responsible by the local community. He was the oldest male member of the household, for his father had been called up for military service in the German Army. Partly to fill his father's absence, Faiss sometimes ran errands using a small wooden cart, including for Steiner. On the afternoon of 7 October, Steiner's housekeeper asked Faiss to run an errand nearby. By dusk, he had still not returned; the ensuing search involved much of the town and discovered his body beneath an overturned horse-drawn wagon laden with furniture.

Faiss's body was laid out in a corner of a building nearby, and Steiner visited daily. Steiner offered a eulogy at the funeral, held on 10 October, and closed by reading a mantram, or blessing, addressed to the "Spirit of his soul, active guardian". Two months later, Albert Faiss died in hospital, having contracted pneumonia and rib inflammation on the battlefield. Steiner delivered a eulogy on 27 December, stating that the father was "now being welcomed by the soul of the precious child", with whom "we know your soul to be united now". (Note: der Du empfangen wirst von der Seele des teuren Kindes, mit der vereint wir Dich wissen)

Maryon, who had returned to Dornach three or four months earlier, likely experienced these events firsthand. She may also have known Theo Faiss and his mother; during her stay in Dornach at the beginning of the year, too, it is possible she met his father.

==== Significance ====
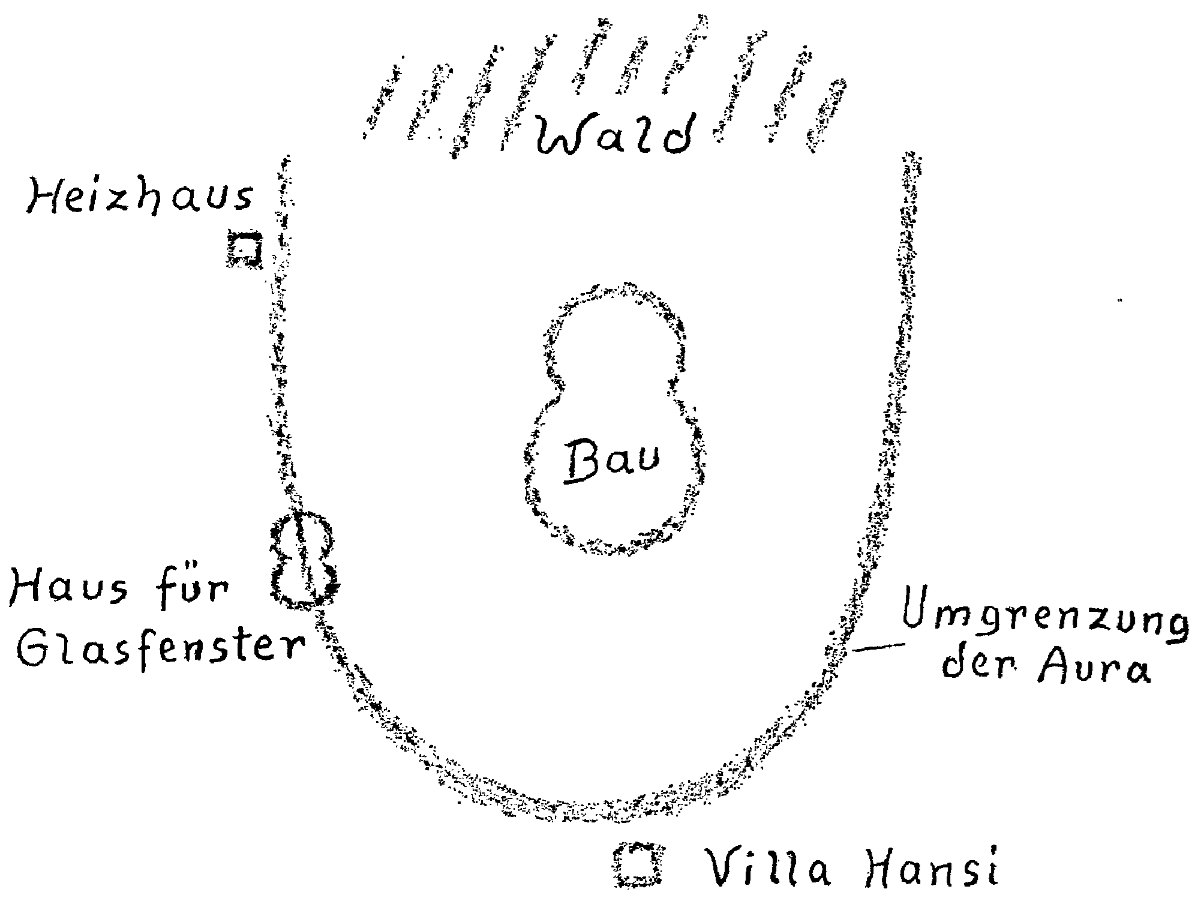
Steiner's drawing showing the boundaries of Faiss's "etheric aura" around the Goetheanum (Note: Bau is the Goetheanum; Heizhaus is the boiler house; Haus für Glasfenster is where the glass windows of the Goetheanum were cut; Villa Hansi is Steiner's house; Wald is the forest; and Umgrenzung der Aura is the boundary of the aura. According to Steiner, "It is possible to determine how widely [the aura] extends. If you see the Dornach building (and those who have already seen it are aware of this), it is a circular building with two cupolas. Here we have a boiler house shaped in a particular way in accordance with spiritual-scientific principles, and here we have another house where the glass windows for the building are cut. I might mention, by the way, that somewhere here is the so-called 'Haus Hansi', where we live. Now it is remarkable that this aura of little Theodor Faill envelops the whole building as far as this spot where the wood begins, then past the boiler house and then, after passing directly through this building where the windows are being cut, passes by Haus Hansi without enclosing it. Thus as one enters the building, one actually steps within this etheric aura." (Es ist möglich, wirklich zu bestimmen, wie weit diese Einhüllung geht. Wenn Sie den Dornacher Bau sehen werden — diejenigen, die ihn schon gesehen haben, wissen es —, es ist ein Doppelrundbau (siehe Zeichnung). Hier haben wir ein Heizhaus, in einer besonderen Art nach Grundsätzen der Geisteswissenschaft angelegt, und hier haben wir dann ein anderes Haus angelegt, wo die Glasfenster für den Bau geschliffen werden. Nur nebenbei will ich erwähnen, daß etwa hier das sogenannte «Haus Hansi» ist — das ist das Haus, in dem wir wohnen. Nun ist es merkwürdig, daß bis hier, gegen den Wald hinauf, dann gerade an dem Heizhaus vorbei, mitten durchschneidend diesen Bau, wo die Fenster geschliffen werden, und hier an diesem Haus vorbei, Haus Hansi, dieses nicht einschließend, diese Aura des kleinen Theodor Faiß einhüllt den ganzen Bau. So daß man in der Tat, wenn man den Bau betritt, diese Ätheraura betritt.))

In at least fifteen speeches and lectures, Steiner repeatedly found spiritual meaning in Faiss's death, and linked it to the anthroposophical movement. Starting with his eulogy, Steiner explained Faiss's death as an intentional spiritual event rather than mere coincidence. In a lecture that evening, he described the death as "a remarkable experience of karma" (Note: merkwürdiges Karma) in which Faiss was "summoned back by spiritual powers": (Note: zurückgefordert wurde von den geistigen Mächten) "We see clearly that, in order to bring about the fulfillment of this karma, the wagon was led to that spot, and then the wagon was overturned so that the karma of that particular individual might be fulfilled". (Note: um die Verwirklichung dieses Karmas herbeizuführen, an jene Stelle der Wagen hingeführt worden ist, und daß der Wagen umgestürzt ist, um das Karma jenes Menschenlebens zu vollenden)

As Steiner explained it, Faiss's death provided a spiritual sheath protecting the Goetheanum, which was then under construction. In June 1915, for example, he declared that the building "has been enveloped to quite a wide extent by the enlarged etheric body of this child as by an aura". (Note: von dem vergrößerten Ätherleib dieses Kindes – bis in weitem Umkreis – unser Dornacher Bau wie von einer Aura eingehüllt ist) Steiner made a drawing during the lecture, showing what he understood to be the boundaries of this "etheric aura". (Note: Ätheraura)

==== Fire ====
On the night of New Year's Eve 1922 and morning of New Year's Day 1923, the Goetheanum burned to the ground, possibly due to arson. Anthroposophists have offered a variety of interpretations for why it was able to do so, if protected by the aura of Faiss. To Maryon's biographer Rex Raab, Faiss "contributed through his sacrifice to the fact that the building, when it fell prey to the flames and dissolved into the Earth's atmosphere, was able to 'sacrifice' itself in the right way, so as to form, from then on, a special protective sheath for the entire Earth". (Note: durch ihr Opfer dazu beigetragen, daß sich der Bau, als er ein Raub der Flammen wurde und in die Atmosphäre der Erde aufging, sich in der richtigen Art «opfern» konnte, um seither für die ganze Erde eine besondere Schutzhülle zu bilden)

Judith von Halle, by contrast, explains the fire by stating that Faiss's protective sheath had come to an end in October 1921. The interpretation relies on Steiner's belief that humans develop in seven-year spiritual cycles: forming what he termed an etheric body over the first seven years, an astral body from seven to fourteen, and the remainder of one's terrestrial being from fourteen to twenty-one. To von Halle, Faiss's October 1914 death, shortly after his seventh birthday in July, meant that his etheric body had only just become fully formed. In death, as it would have done in life, she states, Faiss's body continued to "age" through his astral cycle, during which he offered protection to the Goetheanum. In October 1921, therefore—seven years after Faiss died—von Halle concludes that he passed to the next cycle, and the protection ended.

== Description ==
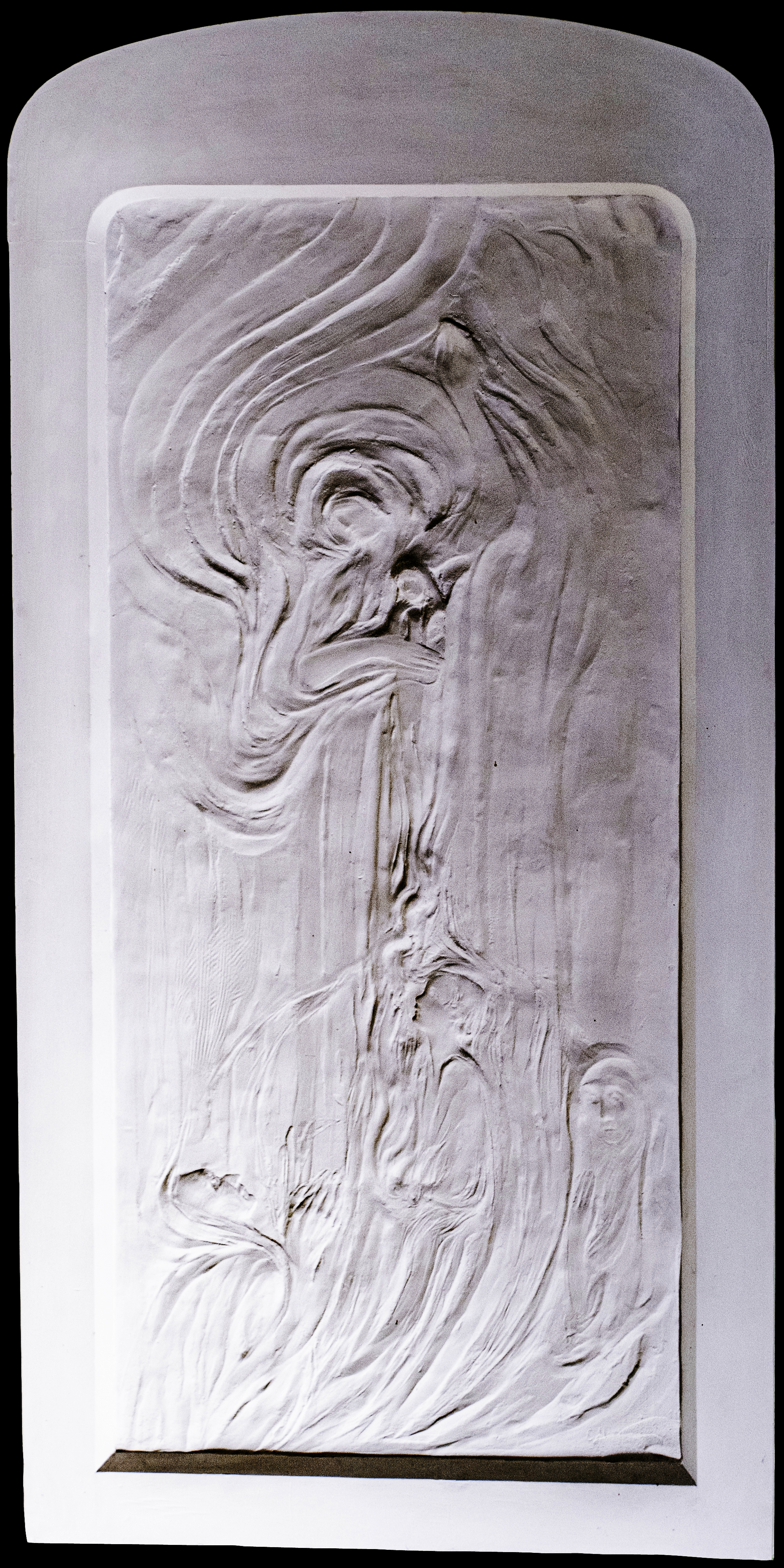
Version 1 (enhanced contrast)

Version 2 in bronze

Maryon created two versions of In Memory of Theo Faiss. Both are dated 1921; Raab terms them the first (earlier) and second (later) versions based on stylistic characteristics.

=== First version ===
The first version of the relief is 71.5 cm (28.1 in) tall and 33.5 cm (13.2 in) wide—a slightly elongated double square. It is signed by Maryon and dated 1921; the date is partly damaged, leaving the month illegible. The relief is divided horizontally into three stylistic elements.

The bottom third depicts three individuals. Their upper bodies rise out of a motif that is both plant-like and flame-like. A woman, likely Faiss's mother, is on the right; of the five figures depicted in the relief, hers is the only face that is concave. On the left is the figure of a man—possibly Faiss's father or Steiner—with hands clasped to his chest in prayer. A third figure, presumably Theo Faiss himself, is in the middle and slightly above them—in physical rather than spiritual form, with outstretched hands.

The middle portion of the relief also depicts Theo Faiss, this time in spiritual form. Smaller than the physical Faiss below, the spiritual version is doll-like, and rises upwards. Its head is bowed slightly forward, and its hands are raised; the whole body is held by, and rests against the chest of, a spiritual being, seemingly a guardian angel.

The upper third of the relief shows this guardian angel. One hand cradles the spiritual Faiss; the other gestures upwards, towards higher realms.

=== Second version ===
The second version is a variant of the first. The width is the same—33.5 cm (13.2 in)—but the height, 67 cm (26 in), is slightly shorter, making the work an exact double square. Like the first, it is signed and dated 1921.

The second version contains only the two upper elements of the first: the guardian spirit lifting the spiritual form of Faiss. These figures appear more relaxed than in the first version. The bottom portion, where the first version depicts the earthly Faiss, his mother, and a man identified as either his father or Steiner, is absent.

== Themes ==
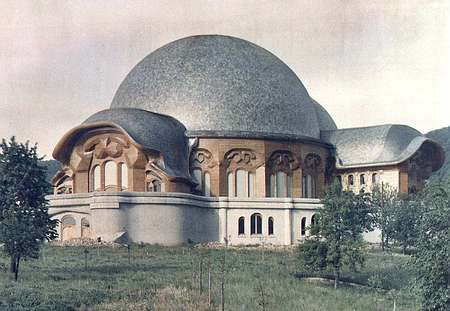
The first Goetheanum, a timber-and-concrete structure designed by Steiner

Two thematic interpretations of In Memory of Theo Faiss have been offered. In the first, the relief relates to the moment of Faiss's death. In the second, it relates to the end of Faiss's spiritual protection over the Goetheanum.

The first interpretation was put forth by Raab. According to him, the work depicts the moment of Faiss's sacrificial death and his passage into the spiritual world. Faiss's outstretched arms suggest that he is ready for sacrifice; he is to be reborn in the spiritual world like a butterfly. His father clasps his arms as if in prayer, meanwhile, as if submitting himself to God's will. The angel figure, for its part, appears as a messenger from heaven sent to retrieve Faiss's soul, just as the Roman god Mercury, the traditional guide of souls (psychopomp), escorted souls to the underworld. Taken as a whole, under this view the work is the sculptural embodiment of the mantram with which Steiner eulogized Faiss, asking that his soul be entrusted to the spirits.

To von Halle and Martina Maria Sam, by contrast, the work relates to events years later. Von Halle states that it shows the moment seven years after Faiss died, when, she says, Faiss passed on to the next seven-year cycle, and his protective sheath over the Goetheanum came to an end. She therefore interprets the work as having been created around October 1921, the seventh anniversary of Faiss's death.

To von Halle, furthermore, the concavity of Faiss's mother's face in the first version shows that she is grieving in the earthly sphere. Whereas Raab sees Ida Faiss's expression as one of resignation to her fate, von Halle sees it as one of adoration and devout gratitude after having spent seven years spiritually supporting him. Also unlike Raab, who sees the male figure on the left as Faiss's father, von Halle identifies it as Steiner—with convex face, operating beyond the threshold of the spirit world—offering his thanks to Faiss, on the one hand, and expressing concern and praying for continued protection, on the other. The lack of continued protection is, according to von Halle, why the Goetheanum was able to burn as it did at the end of 1922. Similarly, Sam suggests that the work "is directly connected to the fire". (Note: direkt mit dem Brandgeschehen zusammenhängt) Stating that Maryon would have designed the work in consultation with Steiner, she suggests that it may represent the "metamorphosis of Theo's task in an artistic form". (Note: Metamorphose der Aufgabe Theos in künstlerischer Art)

Beyond the specific event depicted, Raab terms the work the "true monument" (Note: eigentliche Denkmal) to Faiss and his death. He states that the work serves a dual role as a "living memento mori", (Note: lebendigen memento mori) evoking mortality while keeping alive the memory of Faiss.

== Provenance ==
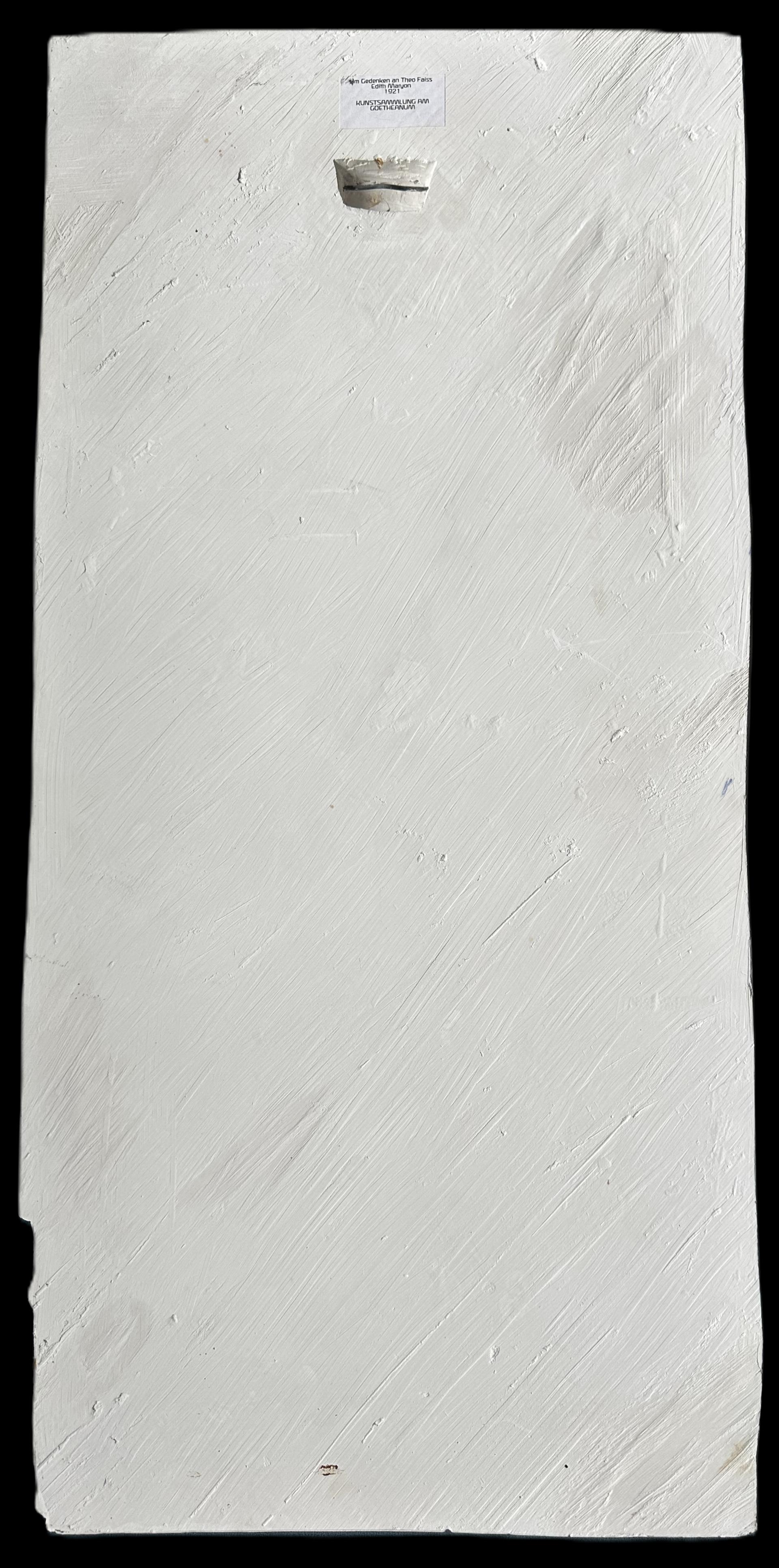
Back of version 2 in plaster. The label reads "In Memory of Theo Faiss / Edith Maryon / 1921 / Art Collection at the Goetheanum" (Note: Im Gedenken an Theo Faiss / Edith Maryon / 1921 / KUNSTSAMMLUNG AM / GOETHEANUM).

The first version, wrote Raab, "nearly disappeared into oblivion". (Note: Beinahe wäre ... verlorengegangen.) It was discovered as thirteen dusty plaster fragments by Emil Estermann; he gave them to A. John Wilkes, an English sculptor who restored many of Maryon's and Steiner's original models and casts around 1965. He reassembled the pieces, after which a new cast was made, with the break lines barely visible.

Neither the original nor the mould of the second version is still present in the Goetheanum's studio. It was unknown to Raab—who had already written the chapter of Maryon's biography discussing the relief—until April 1991. At this point he became aware of a bronze version in the Netherlands, although the owners (F. I. Steffelaar-Moulijn and W. Steffelaar) did not know how it ended up there. Raab noted that Maryon's surviving correspondence indicated that she had friendly contacts in the Netherlands, as well as Dutch friends in Dornach, and speculated that she may have offered it as a gift, such as in exchange for hospitality.

== See also ==
- Works of Edith Maryon

== Notes ==
Notes

Original German text

== Sources ==
- Bos, Lex (1987). "Theo Faiss". Mitteilungen aus der Anthroposophischen Arbeit in Deutschland [Bulletin of Anthroposophical Work in Germany] (in German). 41 (3): 203–210. OCLC 314150112.
- "John Wilkes". Consortium Book Sales & Distribution. Archived from the original on 1 February 2026.
- Kottmann-Solinger, Beatriz & Wanner-Faiss, Raphaela (February 2011). "Rudolf Steiner im Umkreis der Familie Faiss" [Rudolf Steiner in the Circle of the Faiss Family] (PDF). Der Europäer (in German). 15 (4): 3–8.
- Maryon, John Ernest (1895). Records and Pedigree of the Family of Maryon of Essex and Herts. London: Self-published.
- Paull, John (2018). "The Home of Rudolf Steiner: Haus Hansi". Journal of Biodynamics Tasmania (126): 19–23.
- Paull, John (2023). "Dornach: In the Footsteps of Rudolf Steiner". Studies in Art and Architecture. 2 (4): 1–11. doi:10.56397/SAA.2023.12.01.
- Petersen, Adelheid (2001). "Dornach in den Jahren 1914/1915" [Dornach in the Years 1914/1915]. In Beltle, Erika & Vierl, Kurt (eds.). Erinnerungen an Rudolf Steiner. Gesammelte Beiträge aus den "Mitteilungen aus der Anthroposophischen Arbeit in Deutschland" 1947–1978 [Memories of Rudolf Steiner: Collected Contributions from 'Communications from the Anthroposophical Work in Germany' 1947–1978] (in German) (New ed.). Stuttgart: Verlag Freies Geistesleben. pp. 184–196. ISBN 3-7725-1979-2.
- Raab, Rex (1993). Edith Maryon: Bildhauerin und Mitarbeiterin Rudolf Steiners [Edith Maryon: Sculptor and collaborator of Rudolf Steiner]. Pioniere der Anthroposophie (in German). Vol. XI. Dornach: Philosophisch-Anthroposophischer Verlag am Goetheanum. ISBN 3-7235-0648-8.
- Sam, Martina Maria (29 June 2007). "Theo Faiss und das Erste Goetheanum" [Theo Faiss and the First Goetheanum]. Das Goetheanum (in German). 86 (26): 8–10. LCCN 51016931.
- Selg, Peter (2008). Rudolf Steiners Toten-Gedenken [Rudolf Steiner's Commemoration of the Dead] (in German). Arlesheim: Verlag des Ita Wegman Instituts. ISBN 978-3-9523425-2-7.

- Translated into English as Selg, Peter (2011). The Path of the Soul After Death. Translated by Creeger, Catherine E. Great Barrington, Massachusetts: SteinerBooks. ISBN 978-0-88010-724-2.

- Selg, Peter (2006). Edith Maryon: Rudolf Steiner and die Dornacher Christus-Plastik [Edith Maryon: Rudolf Steiner and the Sculpture of Christ in Dornach]. Studien zu esoterischen Schülern Rudolf Steiners (in German). Vol. 3. Dornach: Verlag am Goetheanum. ISBN 978-3-7235-1286-9.

- Translated into English as Selg, Peter (2022). Edith Maryon: Rudolf Steiner and the Sculpture of Christ in Dornach. Translated by Barton, Matthew. Forest Row: Temple Lodge Publishing. ISBN 978-1-912230-95-2.

- Steiner, Rudolf (1980). Groddeck, Wolfram (ed.). Das Geheimnis des Todes: Wesen und Bedeutung Mitteleuropas und die europäischen Volksgeister [The Mystery of Death: The Nature and Significance of Central Europe and the European Folk-Spirits]. Rudolf Steiner Gesamtausgabe (in German). Vol. 159/160 (2nd ed.). Dornach: Rudolf Steiner Verlag. ISBN 3-7274-1590-8.

- Translated into English as Steiner, Rudolf (2023). Dietler, Urs (ed.). The Mystery of Death: The Nature and Significance of Central Europe and the European Folk-Spirits. Collected Works of Rudolf Steiner. Vol. 159. Translated by Blaxland de-Lange, Simon. London: Rudolf Steiner Press. ISBN 978-1-85584-608-1.
- Published online in part with translations as "The Mystery of Death: GA 159". Rudolf Steiner Archive. Steiner Online Library.

- Steiner, Rudolf (1983). Wiesberger, Hella & Zbinden, Hans Werner (eds.). Die Erkenntnis des Übersinnlichen in unserer Zeit und deren Bedeutung für das heutige Leben [Recognizing the Supersensible in Our Time and Its Significance for Modern Life]. Rudolf Steiner Gesamtausgabe (in German). Vol. 55 (2nd ed.). Dornach: Rudolf Steiner Verlag. ISBN 3-7274-0550-3.

- Translated into English as Steiner, Rudolf (1987). Supersensible Knowledge. Collected Works of Rudolf Steiner. Vol. 55. Translated by Stebbing, Rita. London: Rudolf Steiner Press. ISBN 0-85440-255-1.
- Published online in part with translations as "Recognizing the Supernatural in our Time and its Significance for Modern Life: GA 55". Rudolf Steiner Archive. Steiner Online Library.

- Steiner, Rudolf (1984). Froböse, Edwin & Jenny, Paul (eds.). Unsere Toten: Ansprachen, Gedenkworte und Meditationssprüche 1906–1924 [Our Dead: Addresses, Memorial Words, and Meditative Sayings 1906–1924] (PDF). Rudolf Steiner Gesamtausgabe (in German). Vol. 261 (2nd ed.). Dornach: Rudolf Steiner Verlag. ISBN 3-7274-2610-1.

- Translated into English as Steiner, Rudolf (2011). Our Dead: Memorial, Funeral, And Cremation Addresses 1906–1924. Collected Works of Rudolf Steiner. Vol. 261. Translated by Seiler, Sabine & Bamford, Christopher. Great Barrington, Massachusetts: SteinerBooks. ISBN 978-0-88010-650-4.
- Published online in part with translations as "Our Dead: GA 261". Rudolf Steiner Archive. Steiner Online Library.

- Steiner, Rudolf (1985). Trapp, Ulla & Oling, G. (eds.). Der Dornacher Bau als Wahrzeichen geschichtlichen Werdens und künstlerischer Umwandlungsimpulse [The Dornach Building as a Symbol of Historical Development and Artistic Transformation]. Rudolf Steiner Gesamtausgabe (in German). Vol. 287 (2nd ed.). Dornach: Rudolf Steiner Verlag. ISBN 3-7274-2870-8.

- Translated into English as Steiner, Rudolf (2017a). Architecture as Peacework: The First Goetheanum, Dornach, 1914. Collected Works of Rudolf Steiner. Vol. 287. Translated by Amrine, Frederick. Great Barrington, Massachusetts: SteinerBooks. ISBN 978-1-62148-099-0.
- Published online in part with translations as "The Building at Dornach: GA 287". Rudolf Steiner Archive. Steiner Online Library.

- Steiner, Rudolf (1987a). Waeger, Johann (ed.). Lucifer–Gnosis, 1903–1908: Grundlegende Aufsätze zur Anthroposophie und Berichte [Lucifer–Gnosis, 1903–1908: Foundational Essays on Anthroposophy and Reports]. Rudolf Steiner Gesamtausgabe (in German). Vol. 34 (2nd ed.). Dornach: Rudolf Steiner Verlag. ISBN 3-7274-0340-3.

- Published online in part with translations as "Essays on Anthroposophy from the Journals Lucifer and Lucifer–Gnosis, 1903-1908: GA 34". Rudolf Steiner Archive. Steiner Online Library.

- Steiner, Rudolf (1990). Donat, Konrad (ed.). Rudolf Steiner / Edith Maryon: Briefwechsel [Rudolf Steiner / Edith Maryon: Correspondence] (PDF). Rudolf Steiner Gesamtausgabe (in German). Vol. 263/1. Dornach: Rudolf Steiner Verlag. ISBN 3-7274-2631-4.

- Published online in part with translations as "Correspondence with Edith Maryon 1912–1924: GA 263". Rudolf Steiner Archive. Steiner Online Library.

- von Halle, Judith (2010). Die Christus-Begegnung der Gegenwart und der Geist des Goetheanum [Encountering Christ Today and the Spirit of the Goetheanum] (in German). Dornach: Verlag für Anthroposophie. ISBN 978-3-03769-026-0.

- Translated into Italian, with chapter available online, as von Halle, Judith (2011a). "Theo Faiss e la protezione sacrificale della dimora dei Misteri" [Theo Faiss and the sacrificial protection of the dwelling of the Mysteries]. L'incontrare il Cristo oggi e lo spirito del Goetheanum [Encountering Christ Today and the Spirit of the Goetheanum] (in Italian). Translated by Cammerinesi, Piero. San Lazzaro di Savena: CambiaMenti. pp. 77–86. ISBN 978-88-96029-12-1.

- von Halle, Judith (October 2011b). "L'incontro con il Cristo nel presente: e lo spirito del Goetheanum" [The Encounter with Christ in the Present: and the Spirit of the Goetheanum] (PDF). L'Archetipo (in Italian). XVI (10). Translated by Cammerinesi, Piero: 23–26.
- von Halle, Judith (November 2011c). "L'incontro con il Cristo nel presente: e lo spirito del Goetheanum" [The Encounter with Christ in the Present: and the Spirit of the Goetheanum] (PDF). L'Archetipo (in Italian). XVI (11). Translated by Cammerinesi, Piero: 16–21.
