= Sergei O. Prokofieff =

Russian anthroposophist

Sergei Olegovich Prokofieff (16 January 1954 – 26 July 2014) was a Russian anthroposophist. He was the grandson of the composer Sergei Prokofiev and his first wife Lina Prokofiev, and the son of Oleg Prokofiev and his first wife Sofia Feinberg (1928—2025). Born in Moscow, he studied fine arts and painting at the Moscow School of Art. He encountered anthroposophy in his youth, and soon made the decision to devote his life to it.

Prokofieff, who published as Sergei O. Prokofieff, wrote his first book, Rudolf Steiner and the Founding of the New Mysteries, while living in Soviet Russia. The book was first published in German in 1982 and in English translation in 1986. After the collapse of the Soviet Union, he was a co-founder of the Anthroposophical Society in Russia. At Easter 2001, he became a member of the Executive Council of the General Anthroposophical Society in Dornach, Switzerland.

Prokofieff was a prolific author; at the core of his work is an attempt to develop a deepened understanding of Christianity on the basis of Rudolf Steiner's spiritual-scientific research. In 1989, Prokofieff wrote The Spiritual Origins of Eastern Europe and the Future Mysteries of the Holy Grail, a book which analysed the spiritual currents affecting Russia and the Slavonic world generally and in relation to worldly societal and geopolitical events and change.

Later in his life, Prokofieff wrote two works, The Case of Valentin Tomberg and Valentin Tomberg and Anthroposophy: a problematic relationship, in which he put forward the view that Valentin Tomberg, the Christian Hermeticist, and author (like Prokofieff) of profound Christian occultic books, developed, in his later years, into an apologist for Jesuitism (that term being understood or used, however, in a specifically Anthroposophical sense, not simply relating to the Jesuits as usually understood).

== Writings in English Translation (Chronology) ==
Works are listed chronologically according to the original year of publication in German, prior to English translation. Titles not yet translated into English are given in German.

- 1982: Rudolf Steiner and the Founding of the New Mysteries, Temple Lodge Publishing, London [1986], 3rd Ed. 2017.
- 1986: The Cycle of the Year as Path of Initiation Leading to an Experience of the Christ Being. An Esoteric Study of the Festivals, Temple Lodge Publishing, London [1991, 1995, Rev. Ed. 2000], Reprinted 2014.
- 1986: The Twelve Holy Nights and the Spiritual Hierarchies, Temple Lodge Publishing, Forest Row, UK, Rev. Ed. 2004.
- 1987: Eternal Individuality. Towards a Karmic Biography of Novalis, Temple Lodge Publishing, London 1992.
- 1989: The Spiritual Origins of Eastern Europe and the Future Mysteries of the Holy Grail, Temple Lodge Publishing, London 1993, Reprinted 2016.
- 1991: The Occult Significance of Forgiveness, Temple Lodge Publishing, Forest Row [1991], Rev. Ed. 2004.
- 1992: The Riddle of Dmitri, Temple Lodge Publishing, 2022.
- 1992: Prophecy of the Russian Epic: "How the Holy Mountains Released the Mighty Russian Heroes from their Rocky Caves." With an Introduction to Anthroposophy, Temple Lodge Publishing, London 1993.
- 1994: The Cycle of the Seasons and the Seven Liberal Arts, Temple Lodge Publishing, London 1996.
- 1994: Rudolf Steiner's Research into Karma and the Mission of the Anthroposophical Society, Temple Lodge Publishing, Forest Row 1995, Reprinted 2011.
- 1995: The Heavenly Sophia and the Being Anthroposophia, Temple Lodge Publishing, Forest Row, 2nd Rev. Ed. 2006.
- 1995: The Case of Valentin Tomberg, Temple Lodge Publishing, London 1997.
- 1997: The East in the Light of the West. Three Eastern Streams of the Twentieth Century in the Light of Christian Esotericism: Parts 1 – 3, Temple Lodge Publishing, Forest Row 2010.
  - Part 1: The Teachings of Agni Yoga in the Light of Christian Esotericism;
  - Part 2: The Teachings of Alice Bailey in the Light of Christian Esotericism;
  - Part 3: The Birth of Christian Esotericism in the Twentieth Century and the Occult Powers that Oppose It.
- 1999: The Encounter with Evil and its Overcoming through Spiritual Science. With Essays on the Foundation Stone, Temple Lodge Publishing, Forest Row [1999], 2nd Ed. 2001.
- 2002: May Human Beings Hear It! The Mystery of the Christmas Conference, Temple Lodge Publishing, Forest Row 2004, Reprinted 2014.
- 2003: The Foundation Stone Meditation. A Key to the Christian Mysteries, Temple Lodge Publishing, Forest Row 2006.
- 2003: Valentin Tomberg and Anthroposophy: A Problematic Relationship, Temple Lodge Publishing, Forest Row 2005.
- 2004: What is Anthroposophy? Temple Lodge Publishing, Forest Row 2006.
- 2004: The Mystery of John the Baptist and John the Evangelist at the Turning Point of Time: An Esoteric Study, Temple Lodge Publishing, Forest Row 2005.
- 2006: Relating to Rudolf Steiner: And the Mystery of the Laying of the Foundation Stone, Temple Lodge Publishing, Forest Row 2008.
- 2006: Anthroposophy and The Philosophy of Freedom. Anthroposophy and its Method of Cognition. The Christological and Cosmic-Human Dimension of The Philosophy of Freedom, Temple Lodge Publishing, Forest Row 2009 [first German ed. 2006].
- 2007: The Guardian of the Threshold and the Philosophy of Freedom: On the Relationship of The Philosophy of Freedom to the Fifth Gospel, Temple Lodge Publishing, Forest Row 2011.
- 2008: The Esoteric Significance of Spiritual Work in Anthroposophical Groups and the Future of the Anthroposophical Society, Temple Lodge Publishing, Forest Row 2008.
- 2008: The Mystery of the Resurrection in the Light of Anthroposophy, Temple Lodge Publishing, Forest Row 2010.
- 2009: The Whitsun Impulse and Christ's Activity in Social Life, Temple Lodge Publishing, Forest Row 2011.
- 2009–2011: The Creative Power of Anthroposophical Christology (with Peter Selg), SteinerBooks, Great Barrington, MA, 2012.
  - Part 1: The Christology of the Book "An Outline of Occult Science";
  - Part 2: The First Goetheanum and Its Christological Foundations;
  - Part 3: Christ's Reappearance in the Etheric in Relation to The Fifth Gospel;
  - Part 4: The Christmas Conference and the Founding of the New Mysteries.
- 2010: Why Become a Member of the School of Spiritual Science? Temple Lodge Publishing, Forest Row 2013.
- 2010: The Appearance of Christ in the Etheric. Spiritual-Scientific Aspects of the Second Coming, Temple Lodge Publishing, Forest Row 2012.
- 2010: Honoring Life. Medical Ethics and Physician-Assisted Suicide. A Consideration from an Anthroposophical Point of View (with Peter Selg), SteinerBooks, Great Barrington 2014.
- 2011: Why Become a Member of the Anthroposophical Society? Temple Lodge Publishing, Forest Row 2012.
- 2011: Rudolf Steiner's Path of Initiation and the Mystery of the Ego and The Foundations of Anthroposophical Methodology (Rudolf Steiner), Temple Lodge Publishing, Forest Row 2013.
- 2011: Rudolf Steiner's Sculptural Group: A Revelation of the Spiritual Purpose of Humanity and the Earth, Temple Lodge Publishing, Forest Row 2013.
- 2011: Riddle of the Human ‘I’. An Anthroposophical Study. Temple Lodge Publishing, 2017.
- 2012: Crisis in the Anthroposophical Society and Pathways to the Future (with Peter Selg), Temple Lodge Publishing, Forest Row 2013.
- 2012: And the Earth Becomes a Sun. On the Mystery of the Resurrection, Wynstones Press, UK, 2014.
- 2012: The Esoteric Nature of the Anthroposophical Society, Wynstones Press, UK, 2014.
- 2013: "Time-Journeys" - A Counter-Image to Anthroposophical Spiritual Research, Wynstones Press, UK, 2013.
- 2014: The Michael-Mystery. A Spiritual-Scientific view of the Michael-Imagination and its representation in Eurythmy, Wynstones Press, UK, 2015.
- 2018: '"Rudolf Steiner and the Masters of Esoteric Christianity", Wynstones Press, Stourbridge, England 2018.
- 2020: Rudolf Steiner - Fragment of a Spiritual Biography, Temple Lodge Publishing, 2020.

=== Essays (selection) ===
- "The Task of the Nathan Soul for Humanity." In: R. Steele (ed.): Communities for Tomorrow, Floris Books, Edinburgh 2011.
- "The End of the Century and the Tasks of the Anthroposophical Society." In: S. Gulbekian (ed.): The Future is Now: Anthroposophy at the New Millennium, Temple Lodge Publishing, London 2001.
- Foreword to: Novalis, George MacDonald (tr.): Hymns to the Night / Spiritual Songs, Temple Lodge Publishing, London 1992.
