= Edith Maryon =

British artist (1872–1924)

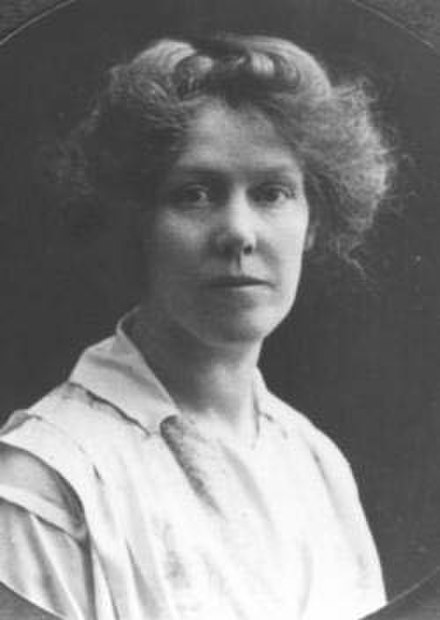
- c. 1920
- Born: Louisa Edith Church Maryon; 9 February 1872; London, England
- Died: 2 May 1924 (aged 52); Dornach, Switzerland
- Notable work: The Dance of Anitra; In Memory of Theo Faiss
- Style: Sculptor
- Relatives: Herbert Maryon (brother)

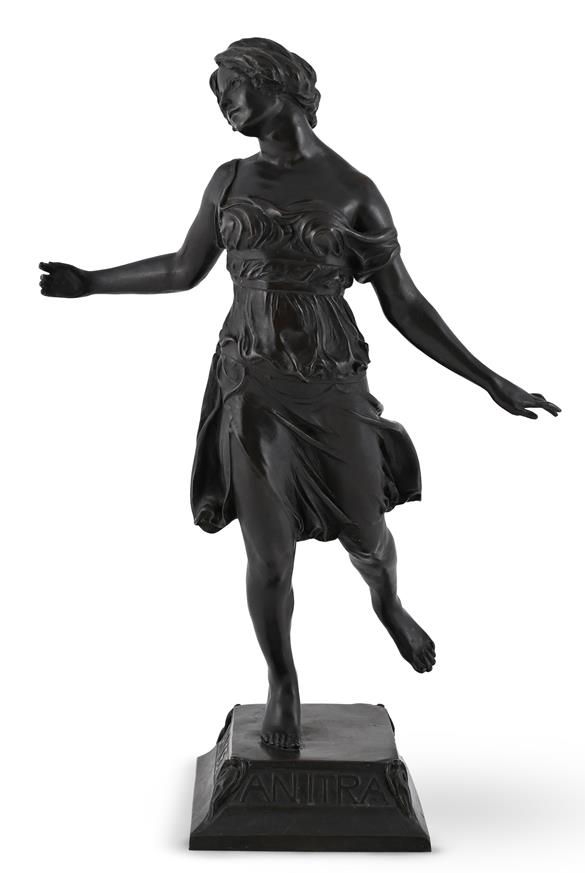
The Dance of Anitra

Louisa Edith Church Maryon (9 February 1872 – 2 May 1924) was an English sculptor. Born in London, England, she studied art at the Royal College of Arts. In sculpture, she worked in the mediums of bronze sculpture, as well as relief sculpture. During her lifetime, her works were exhibited at the Royal Academy of Arts. Many of her works focused on Christianity as a subject matter. Her notable works include the The Dance of Anitra in and In Memory of Theo Faiss.

Along with Ita Wegman, she belonged to the innermost circle of founders of anthroposophy and those around Rudolf Steiner. She died at age 52.

== Early life and education ==
Louisa Edith Church Maryon was born on 9 February 1872 in London, England. She was the second of six children. Her parents were John Maryon Simeon and his wife Louisa Church who lived in London where she grew up. She attended a girls school and later went to a boarding school in the Swiss city of Geneva. During the 1890s she studied sculpture in London at the Central School of Design, and from 1896 at the Royal College of Arts. One of her professors there, Édouard Lantéri, termed Maryon and fellow student Benjamin Clemens his best students.

== Works ==
Her works were exhibited at the Royal Academy of Arts in London, England. Her works of that period showed her leaning toward the subject of Christianity, such as a model of Michael, the relief The Seeker of Divine Wisdom and The Cross of Golgotha.

Maryon met Rudolf Steiner in 1912 or 1913, and after the summer of 1914 she moved to Dornach. She worked with Steiner on the construction of the first Goetheanum, and with him on the modelling and carving of the wooden sculpture The Representative of Humanity. Steiner designed the nine-metre high sculpture to be placed in the first Goetheanum. Now on permanent display at the second Goetheanum, it shows a central, free-standing Christ holding a balance between the beings of Lucifer and Ahriman, representing opposing tendencies of expansion and contraction. The sculpture was intended to present, in contrast to Michelangelo's Last Judgment, Christ as mute and impersonal such that the beings that approach him must judge themselves.

At a foundation meeting held during Christmas 1923 Steiner nominated Maryon as leader of the Section for the Plastic Arts at the Goetheanum (or Sculptural Arts) (German Sektion für Bildende Künste). The following May, she died of tuberculosis.

== Bibliography ==
- Spielmann, Marion H. (1911). "Modern British Sculpture". Encyclopædia Britannica. Vol. XXIV (11th ed.). Cambridge: Cambridge University Press. pp. 501–508.
- Steiner, Rudolf (1980). Groddeck, Wolfram (ed.). Das Geheimnis des Todes: Wesen und Bedeutung Mitteleuropas und die europäischen Volksgeister [The Mystery of Death: The Nature and Significance of Central Europe and the European Folk-Spirits]. Rudolf Steiner Gesamtausgabe (in German). Vol. 159/160 (2nd ed.). Dornach: Rudolf Steiner Verlag. ISBN 978-3-7274-1590-6.

- Translated into English as Steiner, Rudolf (2023). Dietler, Urs (ed.). The Mystery of Death: The Nature and Significance of Central Europe and the European Folk-Spirits. Collected Works of Rudolf Steiner. Vol. 159. Translated by Blaxland de-Lange, Simon. London: Rudolf Steiner Press. ISBN 978-1-85584-608-1.
- Published online in part with translations as "The Mystery of Death: GA 159". Rudolf Steiner Archive. Steiner Online Library.

- von Halle, Judith & Wilkes, John (2010). The Representative of Humanity: Between Lucifer and Ahriman. Translated by Wehrle, Pauline & Wilkes, John. Forest Row, East Sussex: Sophia Blade. ISBN 978-1-85584-239-7.
