= Peter Selg =

German psychiatrist (born 1963)

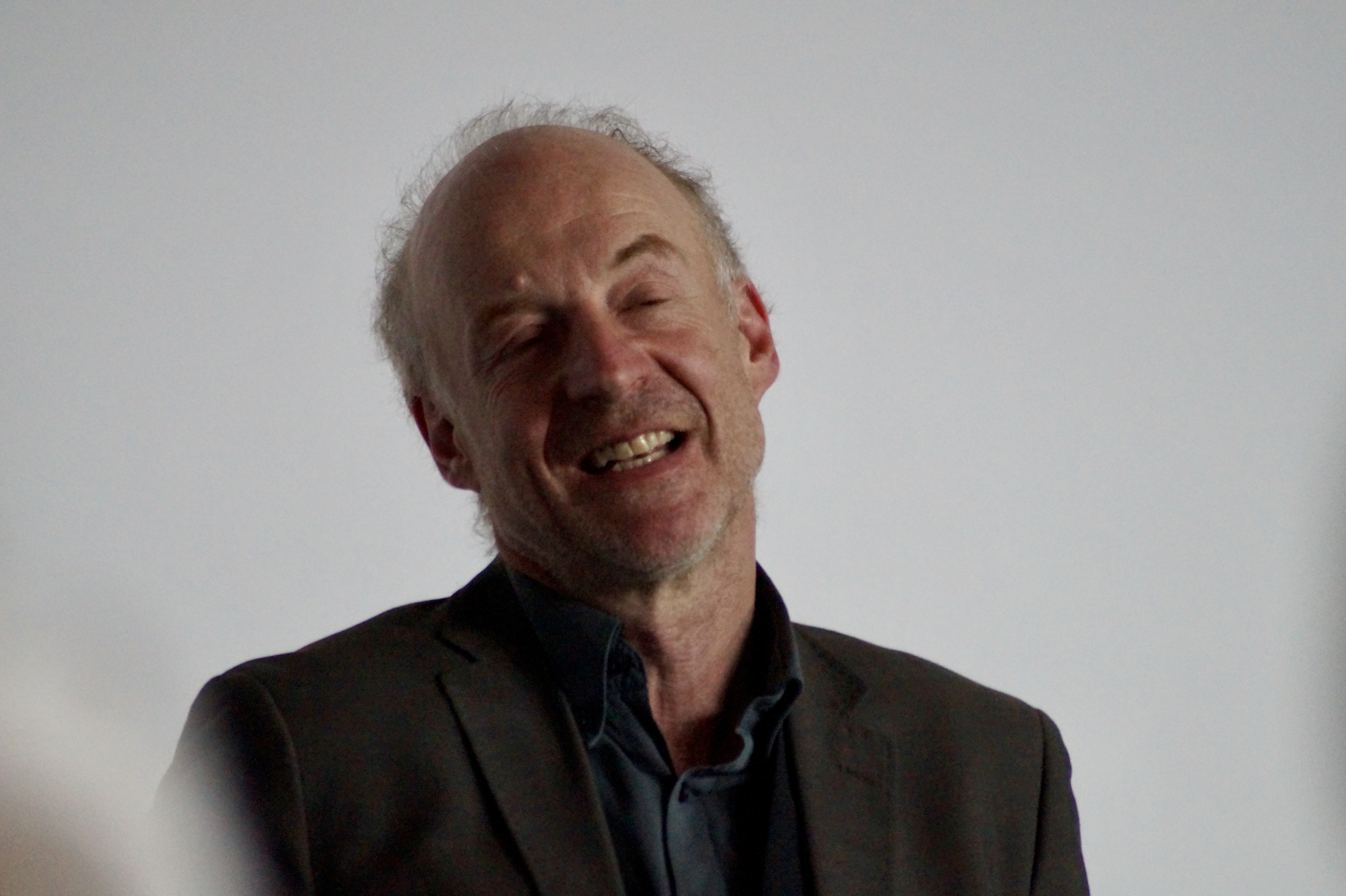
Peter Selg

Peter Selg (born 1963) is a German psychiatrist. He was born in Stuttgart and studied medicine in Witten-Herdecke, Zurich, and Berlin. Until 2000, he worked as the head physician of the juvenile psychiatry department of Herdecke hospital in Germany. Selg is director of the Ita Wegman Institute for Basic Research into Anthroposophy (Arlesheim, Switzerland) and professor of medicine at the Alanus University of Arts and Social Sciences (Germany). He lectures extensively and is the author of numerous books.

== Writings in English translation ==
=== On Rudolf Steiner ===
- Rudolf Steiner, Life and Work. 1861-1925.
  - Volume 1: 1861-1890, Childhood, Youth, and Study Years, SteinerBooks, Great Barrington, MA, 2014.
  - Volume 2: 1890-1900, Weimar and Berlin, SteinerBooks, Great Barrington, MA, 2014.
  - Volume 3: 1900-1914, Spiritual Science and Spiritual Community, SteinerBooks, Great Barrington, MA, 2015.
  - Volume 4: 1914-1918, The Years of World War 1, SteinerBooks, Great Barrington, MA, 2016.
  - Volume 5: 1919-1922, Social Threefolding and the Waldorf School, SteinerBooks, Great Barrington, MA, 2016.
  - Volumes 6 & 7: Forthcoming.
- Rudolf Steiner as a Spiritual Teacher. From Recollections of Those Who Knew Him, SteinerBooks, Great Barrington, MA, 2010.
- Rudolf Steiner and Christian Rosenkreutz, SteinerBooks, Great Barrington 2012.

=== On Christology ===
- The Destiny of the Michael Community. Foundation Stone for the Future, SteinerBooks, Great Barrington 2014.
- The Lord’s Prayer and Rudolf Steiner: A Study of His Insights into the Archetypal Prayer of Christianity, Floris Books, Edinburgh, UK, 2014.
- The Creative Power of Anthroposophical Christology: An Outline of Occult Science | The First Goetheanum | The Fifth Gospel | The Christmas Conference, (with Sergei O. Prokofieff), SteinerBooks, Great Barrington 2012.
- Christ and the Disciples. The Destiny of an Inner Community, SteinerBooks, Great Barrington 2011.
- The Figure of Christ. Rudolf Steiner and the Spiritual Intention behind the Goetheanum's Central Work of Art, Temple Lodge Publishing, Forest Row 2009.
- Rudolf Steiner and the Fifth Gospel. Insights into a New Understanding of the Christ Mystery, SteinerBooks, Great Barrington 2010.
- Seeing Christ in Sickness and Healing, Floris Books, Edinburgh 2005.

=== On general anthroposophy ===
- Spiritual Resistance: Ita Wegman 1933–1935, SteinerBooks, Great Barrington 2014.
- The Last Three Years: Ita Wegman in Ascona, 1940–1943, SteinerBooks, Great Barrington 2014.
- From Gurs to Auschwitz. The Inner Journey of Maria Krehbiel-Darmstädter, SteinerBooks, Great Barrington 2013.
- Crisis in the Anthroposophical Society: And Pathways to the Future (with Sergei O. Prokofieff), Temple Lodge Publishing, Forest Row 2013.
- Rudolf Steiner's Foundation Stone Meditation And the Destruction of the Twentieth Century, Temple Lodge Publishing, Forest Row 2013.
- The Culture of Selflessness. Rudolf Steiner, the Fifth Gospel, and the Time of Extremes, SteinerBooks, Great Barrington 2012.
- The Mystery of the Heart. Studies on the Sacramental Physiology of the Heart in Aristotle, Thomas Aquinas, and Rudolf Steiner, SteinerBooks, Great Barrington 2012.
- Rudolf Steiner and the School for Spiritual Science: The Foundation of the “First Class”, SteinerBooks, Great Barrington 2012.
- Rudolf Steiner's Intentions for the Anthroposophical Society. The Executive Council, the School for Spiritual Science, and the Sections, SteinerBooks, Great Barrington 2011.
- The Fundamental Social Law. Rudolf Steiner on the Work of the Individual and the Spirit of Community, SteinerBooks, Great Barrington 2011.
- The Path of the Soul after Death. The Community of the Living and the Dead as Witnessed by Rudolf Steiner in his Eulogies and Farewell Addresses, SteinerBooks, Great Barrington 2011.
- The Agriculture Course: Koberwitz, Whitsun 1924. Rudolf Steiner and the Beginnings of Biodynamics, Temple Lodge Publishing, Forest Row 2010.

=== On anthroposophical medicine and curative education ===
- I Am for Going Ahead. Ita Wegman's Work for the Social Ideals of Anthroposophy, SteinerBooks, Great Barrington 2012.
- (Ed.) Karl König: The Child with Special Needs: Letters and Essays on Curative Education, Floris Books, Edinburgh 2009.
- (Ed.) Ita Wegman and Karl König. Letters and Documents, Floris Books, Edinburgh 2008.
- (Ed.) Karl König: My Task: Autobiography and Biographies, Floris Books, Edinburgh 2008.
- (Ed.) Karl König’s Path into Anthroposophy. Reflections from his Diaries, Floris Books, Edinburgh 2008.
- Honoring Life. Medical Ethics and Physician-Assisted Suicide. A Consideration from an Anthroposophical Point of View (with Sergei O. Prokofieff), SteinerBooks, Great Barrington 2014.

=== On child development and Waldorf Education ===
- I Am Different from You. How Children Experience Themselves and the World in the Middle of Childhood, SteinerBooks, Great Barrington 2011.
- Unbornness. Human Pre-existence and the Journey toward Birth, SteinerBooks, Great Barrington 2010.
- The Essence of Waldorf Education, SteinerBooks, Great Barrington 2010.
- The Therapeutic Eye. How Rudolf Steiner Observed Children, SteinerBooks, Great Barrington 2008.
- A Grand Metamorphosis. Contributions to the Spiritual-Scientific Anthropology and Education of Adolescents, SteinerBooks, Great Barrington 2008.
