= Marion Spielmann =

British art critic (1858–1948)

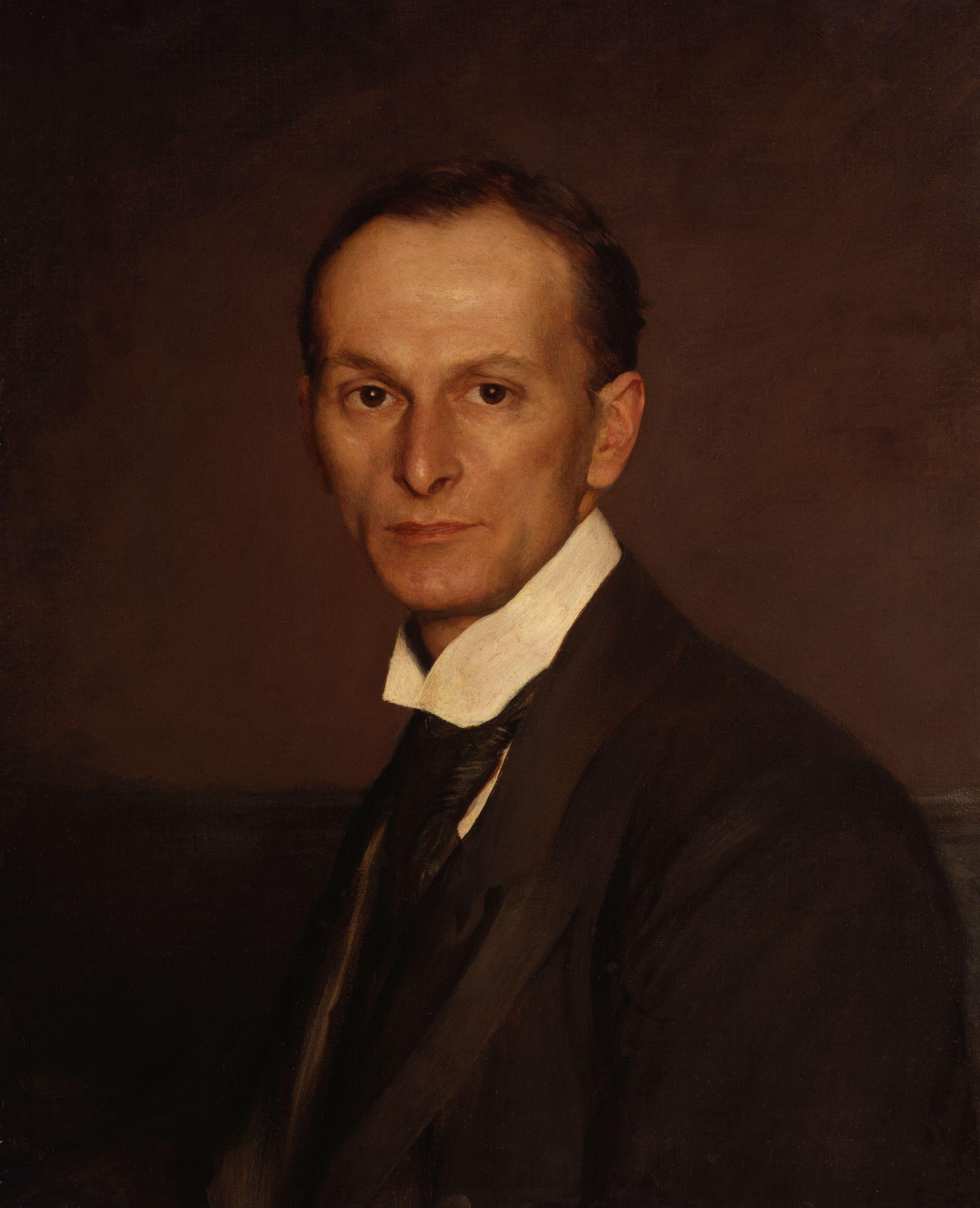
Marion Spielmann painted by John Henry Frederick Bacon.

Marion Harry Alexander Spielmann (London, 22 May 1858 – 1948) was a prolific Victorian art critic and scholar who was the editor of The Connoisseur and Magazine of Art. Among his voluminous output, he wrote a history of Punch, the first biography of John Everett Millais and a detailed investigation into the evidence for portraits of William Shakespeare.

== Early life ==
Marion Spielmann (perhaps confusingly, several female relatives were similarly called Marian Spielmann) was born in London in 1858, the youngest son and eighth child of Adam Spielmann (1812–1869), one of three brothers who had emigrated from Schokken (now Skoki), near Posen (now Poznań). Of Marion's own brothers, two were also celebrated figures: Sir Isidore Spielmann (1854–1925) was the eldest and was a civil-engineer turned art-connoisseur, knighted in 1905; the middle brother, Sir Meyer Spielmann (1856–1936) was primarily concerned with education and youth-rehabilitation, knighted in 1928, but was also an art-collector. Marion's nephews and nieces included the women's suffrage campaigner Eva Hubback.

Spielmann was educated at University College School and University College London. He soon established himself as an art journalist, writing for the Pall Mall Gazette from 1883 to 1890, most notably discussing the work of G. F. Watts.

== Career ==
By the 1880s, Spielmann had become "one of the most powerful figures in the late Victorian art world". From 1887 to 1904 Spielmann edited the Magazine of Art. The influence of Impressionism and Aestheticism was particularly strong at this period, and under Spielmann's editorship, the journal encouraged lively debate about these movements. Spielmann commissioned articles from traditionalists like William Powell Frith and Millais as well as supporters of the new art. He also founded Black and White, a journal devoted to the print revival, and was a regular contributor to The Graphic, the Illustrated London News, and other periodicals."

Spielmann was also active in arts administration and was closely involved with the controversy over the Chantrey Bequest, which led to his altering the conditions under which works were purchased for the bequest by the Royal Academy of Arts. He was the juror for England in the 1898 Brussels Fine Art Exhibition. He also advised internationally on art collecting. He was a member of the Athenaeum.

Spielmann was himself essentially a traditionalist who resisted the advance of Post-Impressionist and modern art. He typically emphasised masculine and decisive qualities in art, for example describing the sculptor George Anderson Lawson as "strong, manly and artistic". For Spielmann, Millais epitomised these qualities. With the rise of Modernism, Spielmann's influence became increasingly marginal.

== Family life ==
In 1880, Spielmann married his first cousin, Mabel Henriette Samuel (1862–1938), sister of Herbert Samuel; they had one son, Percy Edwin Spielmann (1881–1964). Mabel was herself an accomplished writer, best known as a children's author, but also a biographer of Charlotte Brontë and a writer on the history of art. As a children's author, Mabel Spielmann is probably best known for her 1909 work: The Rainbow Book: Tales of Fun and Fancy.
