= Mischa Scorer =

British documentary film-maker

Mischa Scorer (1939-2023) was a British documentary film-maker.

== Biography ==
Mischa Scorer was educated at Westminster School and Jesus College, Oxford. He worked as producer for BBC Television from 1965 to 1979, first in the Religious Broadcasting Department where he made such documentaries as "Padre Pio" (1968) for which he won the first prize in the WACC Monte Carlo Film Festival and in 1969 "The Vatican", the first ever major televised documentary about the Vatican.

In 1970 he moved to the celebrated BBC Documentary Department under Richard Cawston where he made a number of films in the series "One Pair of Eyes", two films about the KGB and its operations, and four films in the groundbreaking series "The Long Search" with Ron Eyre about the great religions of the world.

In 1981 he became one of the founders of Antelope Films in London, one of the first British independent television production companies, writing and directing four films in the classic 13-part series "Heart of the Dragon" about China. For the opening programme in the series "Remembering" he won an International Emmy. He went on to make two films about Venice with Gore Vidal "Vidal in Venice" (1984). From 1986 to 1988 he produced and directed a seven-part series, "Testament", for Channel Four about the history of the Bible, with John Romer.

In 1989 Scorer set up his own production company, Scorer Associates. He produced and directed for the BBC a documentary, Songs of Experience, to mark the 85th birthday of the composer Sir Michael Tippett. During the 1990s he made a number of documentaries in the BBC's "Omnibus" series, including films with Jung Chang, Isabel Allende, Joshua Bell, András Schiff, Roland Petit and Zizi Jeanmaire.

In 2003 he wrote and directed "Degas and the Dance" for PBS “Great Performances” series, a film in HD about the painter Edgar Degas and his obsession with dancers. This was co-produced with the BBC, Arte and NHK and the film won him a Peabody Award.

In 2006 Scorer established The Masterclass Media Foundation, a non-profit organisation devoted to filming and recording the world's great musicians giving masterclasses and teaching.

== Filmography ==
Amongst more than 150 documentary films, Mischa Scorer's credits include:

- Searching for Peace in the Middle East (Foundation for Middle East Peace)
  Documentary about possible solutions to the Israeli/Palestinian conflict presented by Landrum Bolling. (2006)
- Degas and the Dance (PBS; BBC; Arte; NHK)
  One hour film in High Definition about Edgar Degas and his paintings of dancers. (2003)
  Winner of 2003 Peabody Award; Cine Golden Eagle Award 2004; Grand Prix de L’Image, Fifart (Unesco) 2005.
- Zizi Je T’Aime (BBC Omnibus/Worldwide)
  A profile of Roland Petit the French choreographer and his wife Zizi Jeanmaire, the legendary singer and dancer. (1998)
- The Wanderer (BBC Omnibus/Worldwide) A film about Schubert with András Schiff (1997)
- Degas – The Old Man Mad About Art (BBC Omnibus/Arts Council of England)
  A film presented by Richard Kendall about the extraordinary late paintings of Degas (1996)
- Messiah from Scratch (BBC) Three thousand voices sing Handel's Messiah at the Royal Albert Hall (1996)
- Listen, Paula (BBC Omnibus/AMAYA Distribution) A film about Isabel Allende and the illness and death of her daughter Paula. (1995)
  Winner of Golden Spire Award for Best TV Arts Programme, San Francisco Film Festival 1996.
- Joshua Bell (BBC Omnibus) (1994)
  A profile of the acclaimed young American violinist.
  Winner of CableAce Award 1997
- Wild Swans (BBC Omnibus/AMAYA Distribution)
  A film about the writing of Jung Chang's best-selling book. (1993)
- Brendel on Beethoven (BBC/Philips Classics Productions)
  Alfred Brendel talking about and playing Beethoven Sonatas (1993)
- Songs of Experience – Michael Tippett at 85 (BBC/RM Arts)
  A 65-minute film to mark the birthday of one of Britain's greatest composers. (1991)
- A Hundred Acres (Channel Four/S4C)
  Twenty-six weekly wildlife films about a small area of Wales (1990)
- Testament (Channel Four/PBS)
  A seven-part series with John Romer on the history of the bible (1988)
- The Heart of the Dragon (Channel Four/PBS)
  A 13-part documentary series on China (1984)
  Winner of International Emmy for writing and directing the opening episode "Remembering"
- The Haunt of Man (Anglia TV)
  Documentary exploring worldwide environmental problems. (1982)
- The Long Search (BBC/PBS)
  A 13-part documentary series about the world's great religions (1978)
- The Seven Black Years (BBC)
  A documentary film about the seven years of military dictatorship in Greece (1975)
- Poets in a Barren Land
  A film in the series "One Pair of Eyes" with the composer Sir Michael Tippett (1974)
- The Vatican (BBC) (1970)
- Padre Pio (BBC 1969)

== References and sources ==
- Michael Tippett, Moving into Aquarius, Paladin 1974
- Ronald Eyre, Ronald Eyre on The Long Search, Fount 1979
- Alastair Clayre, The Heart of the Dragon, Collins/Harvill 1984
- John Romer, Testament, Michael O'Mara Books 1988
- Jonathan Stedall, Where on Earth is Heaven? pp375, 295, 406, Hawthorn Press 2009
