= Summoned by Bells =

1960 autobiography by John Betjeman

Book jacket of Summoned by Bells

Summoned by Bells, the blank verse autobiography by John Betjeman, describes his life from his early memories of a middle-class home in Edwardian Highgate, London, to his premature departure from Magdalen College, Oxford.

The book was first published in November 1960 by Betjeman's London publisher, John Murray, and was read by the author, chapter by chapter, in a series of radio broadcasts on the Third Programme (later to become Radio Three) of the BBC. A later, illustrated edition with line and water colour illustrations by Hugh Casson was published in 1989 by Murray (ISBN 0-7195-4696-6). A paperback edition appeared in 2001.

There is also a BBC film version directed by Jonathan Stedall for television in 1976. In an autobiography covering the life of Betjeman before he started his first job, narrated in blank verse by him, Betjeman visits places that played an important part in his early life.

== Synopsis ==
- Chapter I Before MCMXIV — Memories of the nursery, realisation of class. You could:

looking up socially

But what of us in our small villa row
Who gazed into the Burdett-Coutts estate?
I knew we were a lower lesser world ...

looking down socially and geographically

Glad that I did not live in Gospel Oak.
- Chapter II The Dawn of Guilt — The author prefers poetry to his father's fascinating workshop; early lines.
- Chapter III Highgate — His love for Miss Peggy Purey-Cust; trouble with bullies.
Betjeman's a German spy—
Shoot him down and let him die:
- Chapter IV Cornwall in Childhood — To Cornwall by rail, evocative sounds and smells of childhood holidays.
- Chapter V Private School — To the Dragon School in Oxford; bicycling to look at church architecture.
- Chapter VI London — John's father is doing well, they have moved to Chelsea, "the slummy end"; but he preferred leafy Hampstead.
- Chapter VII Marlborough — After a depressing start, the discovery of literature, nature and the Wiltshire Downs; manages poetry better than painting.
- Chapter VIII Cornwall in Adolescence — To Cornwall by road, adolescent family troubles, and bicycling independently to explore Cornish churches.
- Chapter IX The Opening World — Up to Magdalen College, Oxford, influences, hobnobbing, versifying, failing at Holy Scripture.

== Places mentioned in the book ==
The book references several places that hold particular meaning or atmosphere. Among them is St Ervan, where the narrator reflects, "In the cool shade of interlacing boughs, I found St Ervan's partly ruined church..." Other locations include Trebetherick, Pembroke College, Oxford, and Sezincote, each contributing to the sense of place and memory woven throughout the narrative.

== A Ring of Bells ==
In 1962 Betjeman released an abridged version of the book for children, with illustrations by Edward Ardizzone.

== See also ==
- An Oxford University Chest
