= Stedall =

Stedall is a surname. Notable people with the surname include:

- Jackie Stedall (1950–2014), British mathematics historian
- Jonathan Stedall (1938–2022), English television producer and documentary filmmaker
