= Weihs =

Weihs may refer to:

- Daniel Weihs (born 1942), Israeli Aeronautical Engineering professor at the Technion – Israel Institute of Technology
- Donald H. Weihs (1922–2016), American soldier and Olympic biathlete
- Felix Weihs de Weldon (1907–2003), Austrian-American sculptor
- Hans-Dieter Weihs, German Luftwaffe fighter ace
- Thomas Weihs (1914–1983)
- Oskar Weihs (1911–1978), Austrian politician
