= Thomas Weihs =

Austrian doctor and special educator

Thomas Weihs (30 April 1914 – 19 June 1983) was an Austrian doctor and special educator, one of the founders of the Camphill Movement and a pioneer of Anthroposophical curative education.

== Biography ==
Thomas Johannes Weihs was born 30 April 1914, in Vienna (then the Austro-Hungarian Empire), the second child of Gertrude and Richard Weiss (spelling later changed), who had settled in Vienna from Brody in Ukraine. During his studies in Medicine at the University of Vienna, he met Dr Karl König and became part of a youth group whose members formed the core of what was to become Camphill in Scotland.

Being of Jewish origin, he fled Austria together with his first wife, Helene Stoll, completed his doctor's degree in Basel, after which, at the outbreak of World War II he joined Dr König and the others in Scotland. Near Aberdeen, on Camphill estate, they founded the work in curative education for those they called "children in need of special care," which was to occupy him for the rest of his life. He had a number of children with Helene, one of whom, Christine Polyblank, founded the Ringwood Waldorf School.

As Camphill grew, so his responsibilities increased, ranging from farming and general handyman to doctor, educator, lecturer and writer. In 1957 he was appointed Superintendent of the Camphill work by Dr König. He had, by this time, also established a practice as a doctor, including working at Dr. König's own London practice. At the same time, he lectured at Camphill centres throughout the world, and to the general public. It was in this manner that he met BBC film director Jonathan Stedall, then 28 and taking a year off to study at Emerson College. Their collaboration led to films for British television that Stedall made on Camphill, such as "Candle on the Hill".

Weihs’ book Children in Need of Special Care, was published in 1971 and has been translated into 14 languages.

His final work, "Embryogenesis in Myth and Science", was completed on his deathbed and published posthumously.

Besides this, his work as sculptor led to pieces set up on the various farms and public buildings of Camphill.

He died on 19 June 1983, in Aberdeen, Scotland.

== Works ==
=== Films ===
1967–68 in Need of Special Care (BBC2 2 × 60')

- Camphill School, Aberdeen – for children with special needs. (Awarded British Film Academy ‘Robert Flaherty Award’ for best documentary in 1968 and nominated for ‘United Nations Award’.)
- Botton Village, Yorkshire – a Camphill Community for adults with special needs. (Also nominated for British Film Academy ‘United Nations Award’.)

1973

- In Defence of the Stork (BBC1 30') – connections between embryology and the story of creation in the book of Genesis, with Camphill's Dr Thomas Weihs.

1990

- Candle on the Hill (BBC2 3 × 50') – celebrating the 50th anniversary of the Camphill movement and its work for children and adults with special needs.

=== Books ===
- Weihs, Thomas J.; Farrants, Wain (1965). Baruch Luke Urieli (ed.). The Farm as an Individuality. Camphill Villages Trust.
- Weihs, Thomas J. (2000). Anthea M. Hailey; Michael J. Hailey; N. M. Blitz (eds.). Children in Need of Special Care. A Condor book Human Horizons series. Souvenir Press Limited. ISBN 978-0285635692.
- Weihs, Thomas J. (2008). Embryogenesis in Myth and Science. Floris Books. ISBN 978-0863156717.
