= One Pair of Eyes (TV series) =

BBC Television current affairs documentary programme

- Country of origin: United Kingdom
- Original language: English

Production
- Executive producers: Christopher Ralling; Anthony de Lotbiniere

Original release
- Network: BBC Two
- Release: 5 June 1967 – 8 April 1984

One Pair Of Eyes is a British current affairs documentary programme, which was first broadcast on 5 May 1967 on BBC Two. The episodes were broadcast sporadically, usually once a month, with each episode presented by a different person, and focused on a subject that they care about. Those subjects could be controversial, according to David Attenborough who commissioned the series, as he was BBC Two's director of programmes at the time.

The presenters were highly thought of, and from a wide range of fields which included: broadcasters, newspaper and magazine editors, journalists, foreign correspondents, writers, satirists, artists, scientists, astronomers, academics, politicians, trade union leaders, activists, architects, actors, comedians, musicians, composers, businessmen, members of the military, farmers, factory workers, chefs and barons.

== Episodes ==
Episode Number	Episode Title	Presenter	Producer	Executive Producer	Director	Date
Episode 1	Temporary Person Passing Through	James Cameron		Christopher Ralling	Dick Fontaine	6 May 1967
Episode 2	A Traveller in the Dreamtime	Alex Comfort		Christopher Ralling	Brigit Barry	3 June 1967
Episode 3	A City of Magnificent Intentions	Anthony Howard	Peter Robinson	Christopher Ralling		1 July 1967
Episode 4	No Worse Heresy	Nicholas Tomalin	Francis Megahy	Christopher Ralling		29 July 1967
Episode 5	The Road to Kingdom Come	James Cameron		Christopher Ralling	Richard Marquand	23 September 1967
Episode 6	The Dead Hand of Democracy	Jo Grimond		Christopher Ralling	Richard Marquand	23 October 1967
Episode 7	You've Got to Win	Peter Wilson		Christopher Ralling	Peter Robinson	18 November 1967
Episode 8	Stay Baby Stay	Norman Parkinson		Christopher Ralling	Michael Blakstad	16 December 1967
Episode 9	Off to Philadelphia	Tyrone Guthrie		Christopher Ralling	John Gibson	13 January 1968
Episode 10	Berlin: The Haunted House	James Cameron	Christopher Ralling		Christopher Ralling	10 February 1968
Episode 11	Margaret Drabble: A Place Called Exile	Margaret Drabble		Christopher Ralling	Richard Marquand	9 March 1968
Episode 12	Claud Cockburn: One More River to Cross	Claud Cockburn		Christopher Ralling	Charles Denton	13 April 1968
Episode 13	Was Your Schoolmaster Really Necessary?	Robert Morley		Christopher Ralling	Stephen Peet	4 May 1968
Episode 14	Four Cheers for Britain	Gerald Nabarro		Christopher Ralling	Michael Brown	8 June 1968
Episode 15	It's A Two Faced-World	John Mortimer		Christopher Ralling	Simon Campbell-Jones	6 July 1968
Episode 16	Who Are the Cockneys Now?	Georgia Brown		Christopher Ralling	Anthony Searle	17 August 1968
Episode 17	I Think I See Violence All Around Me	Gerald Scarfe		Christopher Ralling	John Irvin	22 August 1968
Episode 18	A Taste of Privilege	Kenneth Tynan		Christopher Ralling	Fred Burnley	31 August 1968
Episode 19	Vikings Anonymous	René Cutforth	Christopher Ralling		Christopher Ralling	28 September 1968
Episode 20	Michael Frayn: 'As When in a Dream We Discover We Can Fly'	Michael Frayn		Christopher Ralling	John Ingram	26 October 1968
Episode 21	If I Had a Million...	Charlotte Bingham		Christopher Ralling	Anthony Searle	23 November 1968
Episode 22	One Black Englishman	Dom Moraes		Anthony de Lotbiniere	Francis Megahy	21 December 1968
Episode 23	Joe Tilson: I See with my Ears and Hear through my Fingertips	Joe Tilson		Anthony de Lotbiniere	Simon Campbell-Jones	18 January 1969
Episode 24	Romance Is Dead - Long Live Romance	Marjorie Proops		Anthony de Lotbiniere	Anthony Searle	15 February 1969
Episode 25	Return to the River Kwai	John Coast	Anthony de Lotbiniere		Anthony de Lotbiniere	15 March 1969
Episode 26	Through the Eye of a Needle	Jock Campbell, Baron Campbell of Eskan		Anthony de Lotbiniere	Nicholas Garnham	12 April 1969
Episode 27	Can You Speak Venusian?	Patrick Moore		Anthony de Lotbiniere	Simon Campbell-Jones	10 May 1969
Episode 28	Some Talk of Alexander	John Dankworth		Anthony de Lotbiniere	Anthony Searle	31 May 1969
Episode 29	No, But Seriously...	Marty Feldman		Anthony de Lotbiniere	Francis Megahy	7 June 1969
Episode 30	Britain Through Foreign Eyes	Con O'Neill		Anthony de Lotbiniere	Simon Campbell-Jones	5 July 1969
Episode 31	It's a Sad but Beautiful Joke	Gwyn Thomas		Anthony de Lotbiniere	Gilchrist Calder	6 September 1969
Episode 32	The Unreal Image	David Holden	Anthony de Lotbiniere			27 September 1969
Episode 33	Is the Law an Ass?	Francis Camps		Anthony de Lotbiniere	Anthony Searle	18 October 1969
Episode 34	Happiness is Wheel-Shaped	Tom Wolfe		Anthony de Lotbiniere	Charles Denton	24 January 1970
Episode 35	Danger - Women at Work!	Shirley Conran		Anthony de Lotbiniere	Simon Campbell-Jones	7 February 1970
Episode 36	Strictly for the French	Yvonne Mitchell	David Wheeler		Anthony Searle	7 March 1970
Episode 37	The Last of the Good Losers	Brian Glanville	David Wheeler		Michael Houldey	4 April 1970
Episode 38	We're Sliding Towards Destruction	Benjamin Spock	David Wheeler		Michael Rabiger	18 April 1970
Episode 39	Down With All Parties!	John Creasey	David Wheeler		Peter Cotes	2 May 1970
Episode 40	Border Country	Raymond Williams	David Wheeler		Nicholas Garnham	1 August 1970
Episode 41	The Green Revolution	John Cherrington	David Wheeler		Richard Marquand	29 August 1970
Episode 42	The Class that Came In from the Cold	Clive Jenkins	David Wheeler		Barrie Gavin	19 September 1970
Episode 43	Return as a Stranger	Dom Moraes	Anthony de Lotbiniere			17 October 1970
Episode 44	I Draw as Though I Were a Horse Writing his Autobiography	John Skeaping	David Wheeler		David Cobham	14 November 1970
Episode 45	The Dreamwalkers	Idries Shah	David Wheeler		Michael Rabiger	19 December 1970
Episode 46	Alien's Return	George Mikes	David Wheeler		Michael Houldey	9 January 1971
Episode 47	You Must Make People Angry	Mai Zetterling	David Wheeler		Peter Cantor	6 March 1971
Episode 48	Doomsday Never Comes	John Crosby	David Wheeler		William Brayne	27 March 1971
Episode 49	We Must Offer a Vision	John Dancy	David Wheeler		Harry B. Levinson	8 May 1971
Episode 50	Charities Are Not Enough	Des Wilson	David Wheeler		Mischa Scorer	12 June 1971
Episode 51	One Man's Freedom	Anthony Grey	Malcolm Brown		Alan Bell	26 June 1971
Episode 52	A Region of Shadow	Laurens van der Post	Malcolm Brown		Stephen Cross	10 July 1971
Episode 53	You're Never Alone with a Stately Home...	Edward Douglas-Scott-Montagu, 3rd Baron Montagu of Beaulieu	Malcolm Brown		Mischa Scorer	28 August 1971
Episode 54	The Magic is Here and Now	John Braine	Malcolm Brown		Eric Davidson	13 November 1971
Episode 55	Starting from Zero	Leonardo Ricci	Malcolm Brown		Michael Rabiger	11 December 1971
Episode 56	Poets in a Barren Age	Michael Tippett	Malcolm Brown		Mischa Scorer	19 February 1972
Episode 57	Reyner Banham Loves Los Angeles	Reyner Banham	Malcolm Brown		Julian Cooper	11 March 1972
Episode 58	Race Against Time	Hugh Foot, Baron Caradon	Malcolm Brown		Mischa Scorer	3 June 1972
Episode 59	Tom Stoppard Doesn't Know	Tom Stoppard	Malcolm Brown		Michael Houldey	7 July 1972
Episode 60	We're Coming into our Own	Arthur Dooley	Malcolm Brown		Eric Davidson	18 August 1972
Episode 61	Half Way Mark	Mark Boxer	Malcolm Brown		Julian Cooper	1 September 1972
Episode 62	...I Sometimes Think I Really Don't Belong	David Franklin	Malcolm Brown		Peter Robinson	22 September 1972
Episode 63	If You've Got a Pair of Eyes, Use Them	Spike Milligan	Hugh Burnett			19 February 1973
Episode 64	The Real Thing is Always Worse	Allan Prior	Malcolm Brown		Peter Robinson	30 April 1973
Episode 65	Love God - and Do As You Please	Donald Soper	Malcolm Brown		Mischa Scorer	4 June 1973
Episode 66	A Life in My Hands	Antonia Fraser	Malcolm Brown		Fred Burnley	16 July 1973
Episode 67	All Systems Go!	Alan Garner	Malcolm Brown		Laurence Moore	17 September 1973
Episode 68	The Road to Ruritania	Paul Johnson	Malcolm Brown		Julian Cooper	25 October 1973
Episode 69	A Passion for India	Penelope Chetwode	Malcolm Brown		Jonathan Stedall	30 January 1974
Episode 70	Epitaph to a Friendship	Russell Braddon	Malcolm Brown		Tom Haydon	2 May 1974
Episode 71	Food is a Four-letter Word L-O-V-E	Robert Carrier	Malcolm Brown		Bridget Winter	18 July 1974
Episode 72	I didn't know life would be like this!	Eric Newby	Malcolm Brown		Mischa Scorer	16 October 1974
Episode 73	'As a Man Is, So He Sees'	Bernard Lovell	Malcolm Brown		Jonathan Stedall	13 November 1974
Episode 74	Beryl Cook - I Have No Message	Beryl Cook	Jonathan Stedall			19 February 1984
Episode 75	Simon Trehearne - An Independent Life	Simon Trehearne	Jonathan Stedall			26 February 1984
Episode 76	John Wells - The Monkey Puzzle	John Wells	Jonathan Stedall; Robert Toner			4 March 1984
Episode 77	Peter Hillmore - Making Mischief	Peter Hillmore	Jonathan Stedall; Christopher Sykes			11 March 1984
Episode 78	Zdena Tomin - Nationality Uncertain	Zdena Tomin	Jonathan Stedall; Christopher Hale			18 March 1984
Episode 79	Laurie Taylor - Country Blues	Laurie Taylor	Jonathan Stedall; Clem Vallance			1 April 1984
Episode 80	Cecil Collins - Fools and Angels	Cecil Collins	Jonathan Stedall; Christopher Sykes			8 April 1984
