= Anthroposophy =

Spiritual and pseudoscientific philosophy

Anthroposophy is a spiritual new religious movement that was founded in the early 20th century by the esotericist Rudolf Steiner that postulates the existence of an objective, intellectually comprehensible spiritual world, accessible to human experience. Followers of anthroposophy aim to engage in spiritual discovery through a mode of thought independent of sensory experience. Though proponents say that they present their ideas in a manner that is verifiable by rational discourse, seeking precision and clarity comparable to that obtained by scientists investigating the physical world, many of these ideas have been termed pseudoscientific by experts in epistemology and debunkers of pseudoscience.

Anthroposophy has its roots in German idealism, Western and Eastern esoteric ideas, various religious traditions, and modern Theosophy. Steiner chose the term anthroposophy (from Greek ἄνθρωπος anthropos-, 'human', and σοφία sophia, 'wisdom') to emphasize his philosophy's humanistic orientation. He defined it as "a scientific exploration of the spiritual world"; others have variously called it a "philosophy and cultural movement", a "spiritual movement", a "spiritual science", "a system of thought", "a speculative and oracular metaphysic", "system [...] replete with esoteric and occult mystifications", "a spiritualist movement", folie a culte, "positivistic religion", "a form of 'Christian occultism'", "new religious movement" and "occultist movement". It has been also described as New Age. (Note: Sources for 'New Age')

Anthroposophical ideas have been applied in a range of fields including education (both in Waldorf schools and in the Camphill movement), environmental conservation and banking; with additional applications in agriculture, organizational development, the arts. The Anthroposophical Society is headquartered at the Goetheanum in Dornach, Switzerland. Anthroposophy's supporters have included writers Saul Bellow, and Selma Lagerlöf, painters Piet Mondrian, Wassily Kandinsky and Hilma af Klint, filmmaker Andrei Tarkovsky, child psychiatrist Eva Frommer, music therapist Maria Schüppel, Romuva religious founder Vydūnas, and former president of Georgia Zviad Gamsakhurdia. While critics and proponents alike acknowledge Steiner's many anti-racist statements, "Steiner's collected works...contain pervasive internal contradictions and inconsistencies on racial and national questions."

The historian of religion Olav Hammer has termed anthroposophy "the most important esoteric society in European history". Many scientists, physicians, and philosophers, including Michael Shermer, Michael Ruse, Edzard Ernst, David Gorski, and Simon Singh have criticized anthroposophy's application in the areas of medicine, biology, agriculture, and education, considering it dangerous and pseudoscientific. Ideas of Steiner's that are unsupported or disproven by modern science include racial evolution, clairvoyance and astral projection (Steiner claimed he was clairvoyant and that he spoke with the dead), and the Atlantis myth.

== History ==
=== Early 20th century and before ===
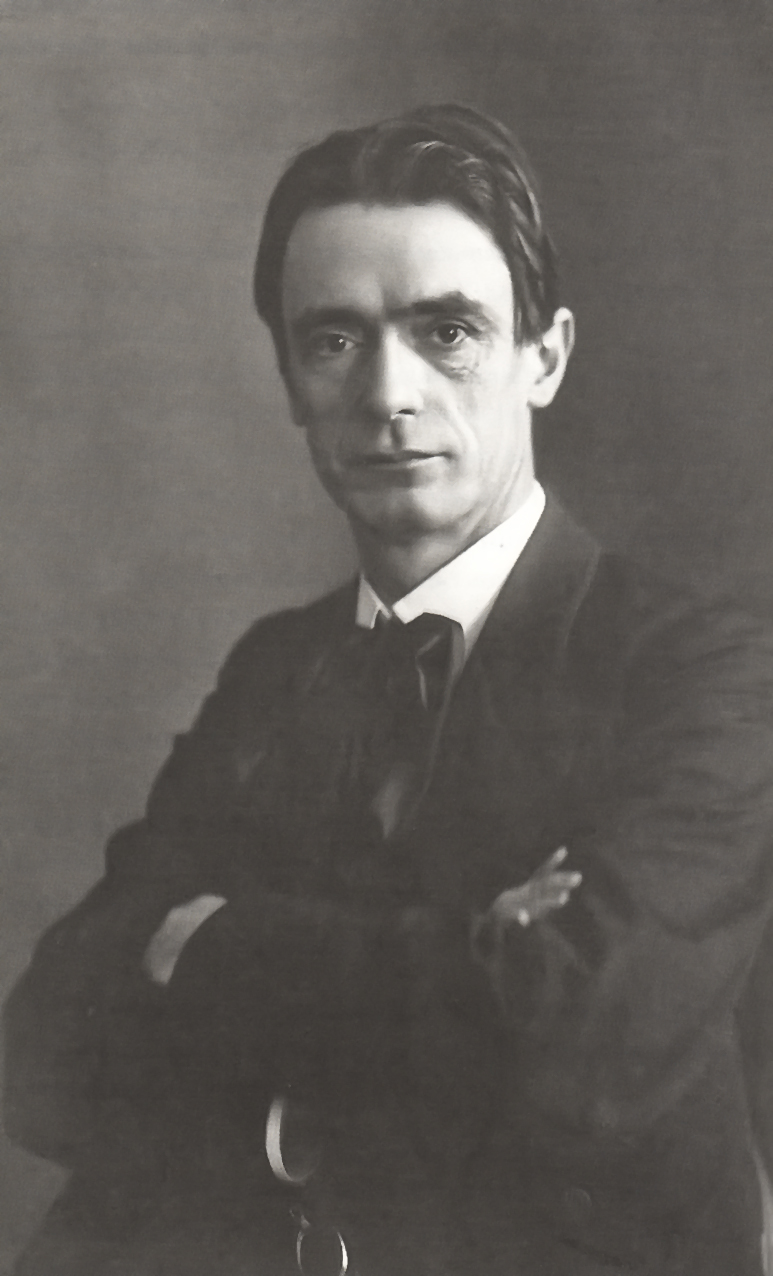
Rudolf Steiner

The early work of the founder of anthroposophy, Rudolf Steiner, culminated in his Philosophy of Freedom (also translated as The Philosophy of Spiritual Activity and Intuitive Thinking as a Spiritual Path). Here, Steiner developed a concept of free will based on inner experiences, especially those that occur in the creative activity of independent thought. "Steiner was a moral individualist". (Note: Ethical individualism is the opposite of ethical collectivism (meaning a moral code which is applicable to everyone). According to Aaron French, "He referred to this process as 'ethical individualism,' a concept which, for Steiner, implied that the ethical value of one's actions had to be decided for oneself, by the individual." According to Heiner Ullrich, "Thus with his 'ethical individualism' the early Steiner delivers a naturalistic doctrine of behavior, not a system of ethics which—as, for instance, Kant does with the categorical imperative—assists in providing an autonomous model for principles of moral behavior.")

By the beginning of the twentieth century, Steiner's interests turned almost exclusively to spirituality. His work began to draw the attention of others interested in spiritual ideas; among these the Theosophical Society. From 1900 on, thanks to the positive reception his ideas received from Theosophists, Steiner focused increasingly on his work with the Theosophical Society, becoming the secretary of its German section in 1902. During his leadership, membership increased from just a few individuals to sixty-nine lodges.

By 1907, a split between Steiner and the Theosophical Society became apparent. While the Society was oriented toward an Eastern and especially Indian approach, Steiner was trying to develop a path that embraced Christianity and natural science. The split became irrevocable when Annie Besant, then president of the Theosophical Society, presented a child Jiddu Krishnamurti as the reincarnated Christ. Steiner strongly objected and considered any comparison between Krishnamurti and Christ to be nonsense; many years later, Krishnamurti also repudiated the assertion. Steiner's continuing differences with Besant led him to separate from the Theosophical Society Adyar. He was followed by the great majority of the Theosophical Society's German members, as well as many members of other national sections.

According to James Webb, "Steiner joined the Theosophical Society in order to take it over."

By this time, Steiner had reached considerable stature as a spiritual teacher and expert in the occult. He spoke about what he considered to be his direct experience of the Akashic Records (sometimes called the "Akasha Chronicle"), thought to be a spiritual chronicle of the history, pre-history, and future of the world and mankind. In a number of works, Steiner described a path of inner development he felt would let anyone attain comparable spiritual experiences. In Steiner's view, sound vision could be developed, in part, by practicing rigorous forms of ethical and cognitive self-discipline, concentration, and meditation. In particular, Steiner believed a person's spiritual development could occur only after a period of moral development.

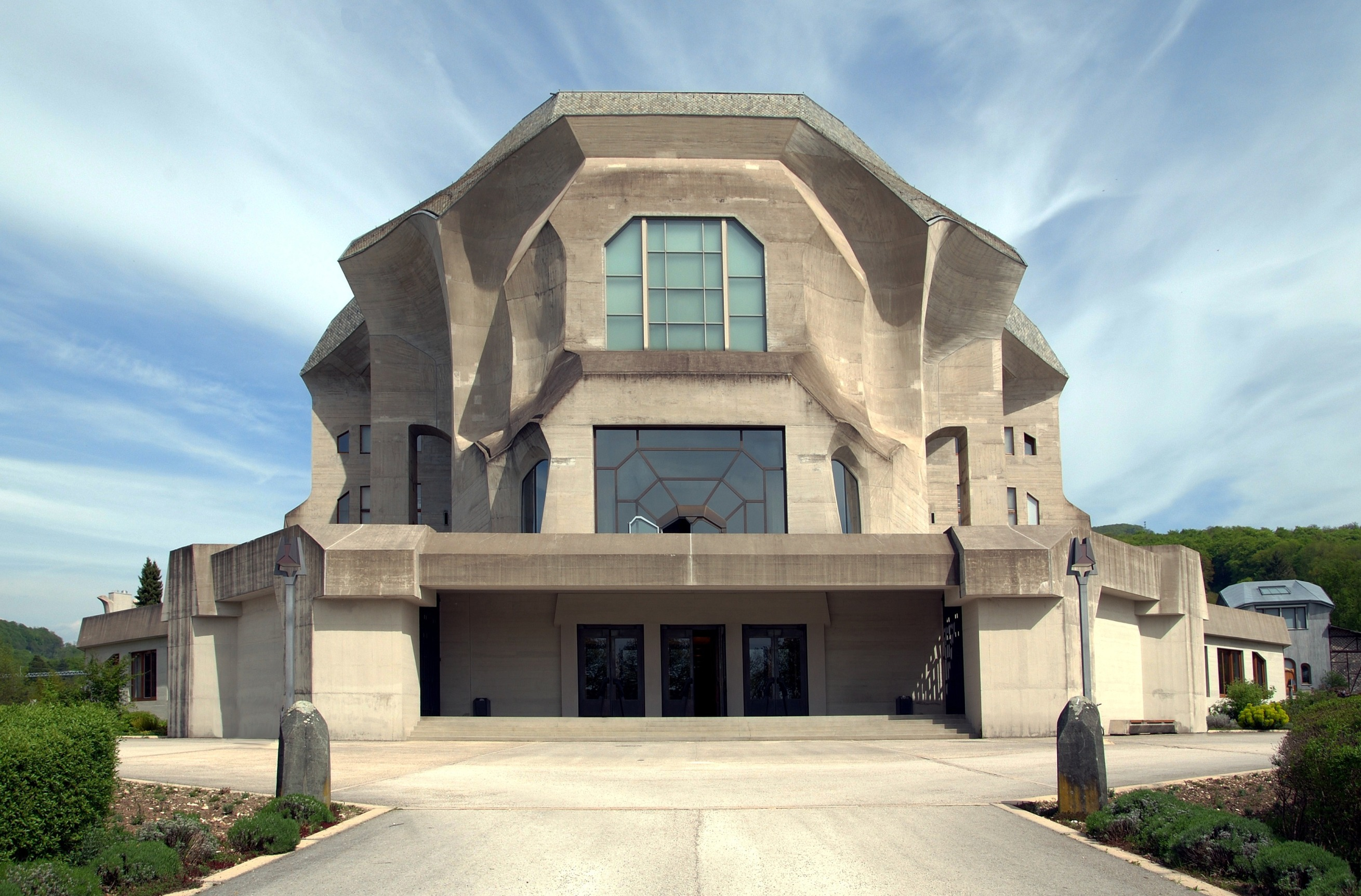
Second Goetheanum, seat of the Anthroposophical Society

In 1912, Steiner broke away from the Theosophical Society to found an independent group, which he named the Anthroposophical Society. After World War I, members of the young society began applying Steiner's ideas to create cultural movements in areas such as traditional and special education, farming, and medicine.

By 1923, a schism had formed between older members, focused on inner development, and younger members eager to become active in contemporary social transformations. In response, Steiner attempted to bridge the gap by establishing an overall School for Spiritual Science. As a spiritual basis for the reborn movement, Steiner wrote a Foundation Stone Meditation which remains a central touchstone of anthroposophical ideas.

=== Nazi period ===
Steiner died just over a year later, in 1925. The Second World War temporarily hindered the anthroposophical movement in most of Continental Europe, as the Anthroposophical Society and most of its practical counter-cultural applications were banned by the Nazi government. Though at least one prominent member of the Nazi Party, Rudolf Hess, was a strong supporter of anthroposophy, very few anthroposophists belonged to the National Socialist Party. In reality, Steiner had both enemies and loyal supporters in the upper echelons of the Nazi regime. Staudenmaier speaks of the "polycratic party-state apparatus", so Nazism's approach to Anthroposophy was not characterized by monolithic ideological unity. When Hess flew to the UK and was imprisoned, their most powerful protector was gone, but Anthroposophy still had supporters among higher-placed Nazis.

As Cristina Burack put it, "Steiner's contradictory views meant that anthroposophy was both attractive and a threat to the Nazi movement." According to Staudenmaier, "He sometimes held antisemitic views and philosemitic views at the same time".

The Third Reich had banned almost all esoteric organizations, claiming that these were controlled by Jews. The truth was that while Anthroposophists complained of bad press, they were to a surprising extent tolerated by the Nazi regime, "including outspokenly supportive pieces in the Völkischer Beobachter". Ideological purists from Sicherheitsdienst argued largely in vain against Anthroposophy. According to Staudenmaier, "The prospect of unmitigated persecution was held at bay for years in a tenuous truce between pro-anthroposophical and anti-anthroposophical Nazi factions."

The anti-esoteric faction ensconced in the SD and Gestapo recognized that they faced influential adversaries in other sectors of the Nazi hierarchy. They knew that Hess and his staff, Baeumler in the Amt Rosenberg, and Ohlendorf in the SD itself were willing to intervene on behalf of anthroposophical endeavors. Minister of Agriculture Darré and Lotar Eickhoff in the Interior Ministry were also seen as sympathizers of anthroposophy, and the SD considered the head of the party's "Examination Commission for Safeguarding National Socialist Writings," Karl Heinz Hederich, a supporter of occultists and astrologers.^{52}

— Staudenmaier 2014, p. 228

While anthroposophists were in the center of the SD's sights, they were supposed to receive relatively mild treatment compared to other occultists.

— Staudenmaier 2014, p. 236

Despite these measures, anthroposophist authors were able to write long after June 1941. Franz Dreidax, Max Karl Schwarz, Elisabeth Klein, Johannes Bertram-Pingel, Georg Halbe, Otto Julius Hartmann, Rudolf Hauschka, Jürgen von Grone, Wolfgang Schuchhardt and others continued to publish throughout the war. But serious disruptions were common.

— Staudenmaier 2014, p. 238

Morals: Anthroposophy was not the stake of that dispute, but merely powerful Nazis wanting to get rid of other powerful Nazis. E.g. Jehovah's Witnesses were treated much more aggressively than Anthroposophists. (Note: Meaning that after 1942, Jehovah's Witnesses were spared from harsh treatment. Jehovah's Witnesses could escape persecution and personal harm by signing a document indicating renunciation of their faith, submission to state authority, and support of the German military.)

Yet, the relative moderation of Heydrich's action, which paled in comparison to measures taken against communists and socialists, Jews, homosexuals, Jehovah's Witnesses, as well as the mentally and physically disabled, continued to reflect the Third Reich's underlying ambivalence toward policing the occult.

— Kurlander 2015a, p. 514

Kurlander stated that "the Nazis were hardly ideologically opposed to the supernatural sciences themselves"—rather they objected to the free (i.e. non-totalitarian) pursuit of supernatural sciences.

According to Hans Büchenbacher, an anthroposophist, the Secretary General of the General Anthroposophical Society, Guenther Wachsmuth and Steiner's widow Marie Steiner were "completely pro-Nazi." Marie Steiner-von Sivers, Guenther Wachsmuth, and Albert Steffen had publicly expressed sympathy for the Nazi regime since its beginnings; led by sympathies of their leadership, the Swiss and German Anthroposophical organizations chose for a path conflating accommodation with collaboration, which in the end ensured that while the Nazi regime hunted the esoteric organizations, Gentile Anthroposophists from Germany and countries occupied by it were let be to a surprising extent. Of course they had some setbacks from the enemies of Anthroposophy among the upper echelons of the Nazi regime, but Anthroposophists also had loyal supporters among them, so overall Gentile Anthroposophists were not badly hit by the Nazi regime.

Yet when Hitler threatened to suppress the Anthroposophical Society, its executive council—which had recently expelled much of its membership—chose to collaborate rather than resist. Marie Steiner, Günther Wachsmuth, and Albert Steffen knew of Hitler's violent intentions toward the Jewish people, since Hitler's attacks on anthroposophy included the accusation that anthroposophy was aligned with the Jews. Rather than standing in solidarity with Hitler's other targets, they disavowed any sympathy for Judaism and assured Nazi leaders that both they and Steiner were of pure Aryan heritage.^{44}

— McKanan 2017, p. 196

Staudenmaier's overall argument is that "there were often no clear-cut lines between theosophy, anthroposophy, ariosophy, astrology and the völkisch movement from which the Nazi Party arose."

=== 21st century ===
By 2007, national branches of the Anthroposophical Society had been established in fifty countries and about 10,000 institutions around the world were working on the basis of anthroposophical ideas.

=== Etymology and earlier uses of the word ===
Anthroposophy is an amalgam of the Greek terms ἄνθρωπος (anthropos 'human') and σοφία (sophia 'wisdom'). An early English usage is recorded by Nathan Bailey (1742) as meaning "the knowledge of the nature of man".

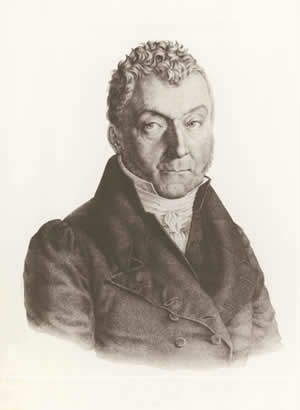
Ignaz Paul Vitalis Troxler

The first known use of the term anthroposophy occurs within Arbatel de magia veterum, summum sapientiae studium, a book published anonymously in 1575 and attributed to Heinrich Cornelius Agrippa. The work describes anthroposophy (as well as theosophy) variously as an understanding of goodness, nature, or human affairs. In 1648, the Welsh philosopher Thomas Vaughan published his Anthroposophia Theomagica, or a discourse of the nature of man and his state after death.

The term began to appear with some frequency in philosophical works of the mid- and late-nineteenth century. In the early part of that century, Ignaz Troxler used the term anthroposophy to refer to philosophy deepened to self-knowledge, which he suggested allows deeper knowledge of nature as well. He spoke of human nature as a mystical unity of God and world. Immanuel Hermann Fichte used the term anthroposophy to refer to "rigorous human self-knowledge", achievable through thorough comprehension of the human spirit and of the working of God in this spirit, in his 1856 work Anthropology: The Study of the Human Soul. In 1872, the German philosopher of religion Gideon Spicker used the term anthroposophy to refer to self-knowledge that would unite God and world: "the true study of the human being is the human being, and philosophy's highest aim is self-knowledge, or Anthroposophy."

In 1882, the philosopher Robert Zimmermann published the treatise, "An Outline of Anthroposophy: Proposal for a System of Idealism on a Realistic Basis," proposing that idealistic philosophy should employ logical thinking to extend empirical experience. Steiner attended lectures by Zimmermann at the University of Vienna in the early 1880s, thus at the time of this book's publication.

In the early 1900s, Steiner began using the term anthroposophy (i.e. human wisdom) as an alternative to the term theosophy (i.e. divine wisdom).

== Central ideas ==
=== Spiritual knowledge and freedom ===
Anthroposophical proponents aim to extend the clarity of the scientific method to phenomena of human soul-life and spiritual experiences. Steiner believed this required developing new faculties of objective spiritual perception, which he maintained was still possible for contemporary humans. The steps of this process of inner development he identified as consciously achieved imagination, inspiration, and intuition. Steiner believed results of this form of spiritual research should be expressed in a way that can be understood and evaluated on the same basis as the results of natural science.

Steiner hoped to form a spiritual movement that would free the individual from any external authority. For Steiner, the human capacity for rational thought would allow individuals to comprehend spiritual research on their own and bypass the danger of dependency on an authority such as himself.

Steiner contrasted the anthroposophical approach with both conventional mysticism, which he considered lacking the clarity necessary for exact knowledge, and natural science, which he considered arbitrarily limited to what can be seen, heard, or felt with the outward senses.

=== Nature of the human being ===
The Representative of Humanity, detail of a sculpture in wood by Rudolf Steiner and Edith Maryon

In Theosophy, Steiner suggested that human beings unite a physical body of substances gathered from and returning to the inorganic world; a life body (also called the etheric body), in common with all living creatures (including plants); a bearer of sentience or consciousness (also called the astral body), in common with all animals; and the ego, which anchors the faculty of self-awareness unique to human beings.

Anthroposophy describes a broad evolution of human consciousness. Early stages of human evolution possess an intuitive perception of reality, including a clairvoyant perception of spiritual realities. Humanity has progressively evolved an increasing reliance on intellectual faculties and a corresponding loss of intuitive or clairvoyant experiences, which have become atavistic. The increasing intellectualization of consciousness, initially a progressive direction of evolution, has led to an excessive reliance on abstraction and a loss of contact with both natural and spiritual realities. However, to go further requires new capacities that combine the clarity of intellectual thought with the imagination and with consciously achieved inspiration and intuitive insights.

Anthroposophy speaks of the reincarnation of the human spirit: that the human being passes between stages of existence, incarnating into an earthly body, living on earth, leaving the body behind, and entering into the spiritual worlds before returning to be born again into a new life on earth. After the death of the physical body, the human spirit recapitulates the past life, perceiving its events as they were experienced by the objects of its actions. A complex transformation takes place between the review of the past life and the preparation for the next life. The individual's karmic condition eventually leads to a choice of parents, physical body, disposition, and capacities that provide the challenges and opportunities that further development requires, which includes karmically chosen tasks for the future life.

Steiner described some conditions that determine the interdependence of a person's lives, or karma.

==== Evolution ====
The anthroposophical view of evolution considers all animals to have evolved from an early, unspecialized form. As the least specialized animal, human beings have maintained the closest connection to the archetypal form; contrary to the Darwinian conception of human evolution, all other animals devolve from this archetype. The spiritual archetype originally created by spiritual beings was devoid of physical substance; only later did this descend into material existence on Earth. In this view, human evolution has accompanied Earth's evolution throughout its existence.

The evolution of man, Steiner said, has consisted in the gradual incarnation of a spiritual being into a material body. It has been a true "descent" of man from a spiritual world into a world of matter. The evolution of the animal kingdom did not precede, but rather accompanied the process of human incarnation. Man is thus not the end result of the evolution of the animals, but is rather in a certain sense their cause. In the succession of types which appears in the fossil record-the fishes, reptiles, mammals, and finally fossil remains of man himself—the stages of this process of incarnation are reflected.

— Waterman 1961, p. 45

Anthroposophy adapted Theosophy's complex system of cycles of world development and human evolution. The evolution of the world is said to have occurred in cycles. The first phase of the world consisted only of heat. In the second phase, a more active condition, light, and a more condensed, gaseous state separate out from the heat. In the third phase, a fluid state arose, as well as a sounding, forming energy. In the fourth (current) phase, solid physical matter first exists. This process is said to have been accompanied by an evolution of consciousness which led up to present human culture.

=== Ethics ===
The anthroposophical view is that good is found in the balance between two polar influences on world and human evolution. These are often described through their mythological embodiments as spiritual adversaries which endeavour to tempt and corrupt humanity, Lucifer and his counterpart Ahriman. These have both positive and negative aspects. Lucifer is the light spirit, which "plays on human pride and offers the delusion of divinity", but also motivates creativity and spirituality; Ahriman is the dark spirit that tempts human beings to "...deny [their] link with divinity and to live entirely on the material plane", but that also stimulates intellectuality and technology. Both figures exert a negative effect on humanity when their influence becomes misplaced or one-sided, yet their influences are necessary for human freedom to unfold.

Each human being has the task to find a balance between these opposing influences, and each is helped in this task by the mediation of the Representative of Humanity, also known as the Christ being, a spiritual entity who stands between and harmonizes the two extremes.

== Claimed applications ==
=== Rationale ===
As noted by Hammer, this means that anthroposophy harbors extensive empirical claims on "the most diverse subjects: matters normally defined as belonging to the domain of science, yet made immune to scientific critique because of Steiner's radical dichotomy—agronomy, chemistry, pharmacology, physiology, anatomy, developmental psychology, astronomy, physics etc." (Hammer 2004, 227).

— Hansson 2022

Libération described Steiner's claims as fantasist theories; it also notes that this did not prevent him from getting traction.

=== Steiner/Waldorf education ===
There is a pedagogical movement with over 1000 Steiner or Waldorf schools (the latter name stems from the first such school, founded in Stuttgart in 1919) located in some 60 countries; the great majority of these are independent (private) schools. Sixteen of the schools have been affiliated with the United Nations' UNESCO Associated Schools Project Network, which sponsors education projects that foster improved quality of education throughout the world. Waldorf schools receive full or partial governmental funding in some European nations, Australia and in parts of the United States (as Waldorf method public or charter schools) and Canada.

The schools have been founded in a variety of communities: for example in the favelas of São Paulo to wealthy suburbs of major cities; in India, Egypt, Australia, the Netherlands, Mexico and South Africa. Though most of the early Waldorf schools were teacher-founded, the schools today are usually initiated and later supported by a parent community. Waldorf schools are among the most visible anthroposophical institutions.

Benjamin Lazier calls Steiner a "maverick educator".

Waldorf schools consider critical thinking unsuitable for children, while Steiner considered it unsuitable for spiritual people.

=== Biodynamic agriculture ===
Biodynamic agriculture, is a form of alternative agriculture based on pseudo-scientific and esoteric concepts. It was also the first intentional form of organic farming, begun in 1924, when Rudolf Steiner gave a series of lectures published in English as The Agriculture Course. Steiner is considered one of the founders of the modern organic farming movement.

"And Himmler, Hess, and Darré all promoted biodynamic (anthroposophic) approaches to farming as an alternative to industrial agriculture." "'[...] with the active cooperation of the Reich League for Biodynamic Agriculture' [...] Pancke, Pohl, and Hans Merkel established additional biodynamic plantations across the eastern territories as well as Dachau, Ravensbrück, and Auschwitz concentration camps. Many were staffed by anthroposophists." "Steiner's 'biodynamic agriculture' based on 'restoring the quasi-mystical relationship between earth and the cosmos' was widely accepted in the Third Reich (28)."

=== Anthroposophical medicine ===
Anthroposophical medicine is a form of alternative medicine based on pseudoscientific and occult notions rather than in science-based medicine.

Most anthroposophic medical preparations are highly diluted, like homeopathic remedies, while harmless in of themselves, using them in place of conventional medicine to treat illness is ineffective and risks adverse consequences.

One of the most studied applications has been the use of mistletoe extracts in cancer therapy, but research has found no evidence of benefit.

Joseph A. Schwarcz regards Steiner as a quack.

=== Special needs education and services ===
In 1922, Ita Wegman founded an anthroposophical center for special education, the Sonnenhof, in Switzerland. In 1940, Karl König founded the Camphill Movement in Scotland. The latter in particular has spread widely, and there are now over a hundred Camphill communities and other anthroposophical homes for children and adults in need of special care in about 22 countries around the world. Both Karl König, Thomas Weihs and others have written extensively on these ideas underlying Special education.

=== Architecture ===
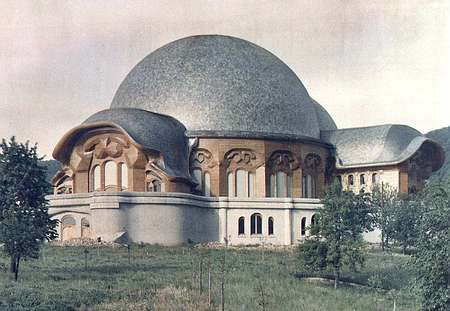
The first Goetheanum, designed by Steiner in 1920, Dornach, Switzerland

Steiner designed around thirteen buildings in an organic—expressionist architectural style. Foremost among these are his designs for the two Goetheanum buildings in Dornach, Switzerland. Thousands of further buildings have been built by later generations of anthroposophic architects.

Architects who have been strongly influenced by the anthroposophic style include Imre Makovecz in Hungary, Hans Scharoun and Joachim Eble in Germany, Erik Asmussen in Sweden, Kenji Imai in Japan, Thomas Rau, Anton Alberts and Max van Huut in the Netherlands, Christopher Day and Camphill Architects in the UK, Thompson and Rose in America, Denis Bowman in Canada, and Walter Burley Griffin and Gregory Burgess in Australia. ING House in Amsterdam is a contemporary building by an anthroposophical architect which has received awards for its ecological design and approach to a self-sustaining ecology as an autonomous building and example of sustainable architecture.

=== Eurythmy ===
Together with Marie von Sivers, Steiner developed eurythmy, a performance art combining dance, speech, and music.

=== Social finance and entrepreneurship ===
Around the world today are a number of banks, companies, charities, and schools for developing co-operative forms of business using Steiner's ideas about economic associations, aiming at harmonious and socially responsible roles in the world economy. The first anthroposophic bank was the Gemeinschaftsbank für Leihen und Schenken in Bochum, Germany, founded in 1974. Socially responsible banks founded out of anthroposophy include Triodos Bank, founded in the Netherlands in 1980 and also active in the UK, Germany, Belgium, Spain and France. Other examples include Cultura Sparebank which dates from 1982 when a group of Norwegian anthroposophists began an initiative for ethical banking but only began to operate as a savings bank in Norway in the late 90s, La Nef in France and RSF Social Finance in San Francisco.

Harvard Business School historian Geoffrey Jones traced the considerable impact both Steiner and later anthroposophical entrepreneurs had on the creation of many businesses in organic food, ecological architecture and sustainable finance.

=== Organizational development, counselling and biography work ===
Bernard Lievegoed, a psychiatrist, founded a new method of individual and institutional development oriented towards humanizing organizations and linked with Steiner's ideas of the threefold social order. This work is represented by the NPI Institute for Organizational Development in the Netherlands and sister organizations in many other countries.

=== Speech and drama ===
There are also anthroposophical movements to renew speech and drama, the most important of which are based in the work of Marie Steiner-von Sivers (speech formation, also known as Creative Speech) and the Chekhov Method originated by Michael Chekhov (nephew of Anton Chekhov).

=== Art ===
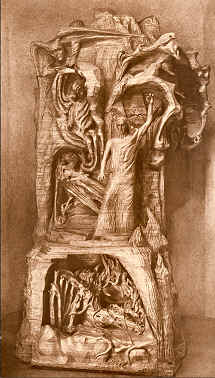
The Representative of Humanity, by Rudolf Steiner and Edith Maryon

Anthroposophic painting, a style inspired by Rudolf Steiner, featured prominently in the first Goetheanum's cupola. The technique frequently begins by filling the surface to be painted with color, out of which forms are gradually developed, often images with symbolic-spiritual significance. Paints that allow for many transparent layers are preferred, and often these are derived from plant materials. Rudolf Steiner appointed the English sculptor Edith Maryon as head of the School of Fine Art at the Goetheanum. Together they carved the 9-metre tall sculpture titled The Representative of Humanity, on display at the Goetheanum.

=== Other ===
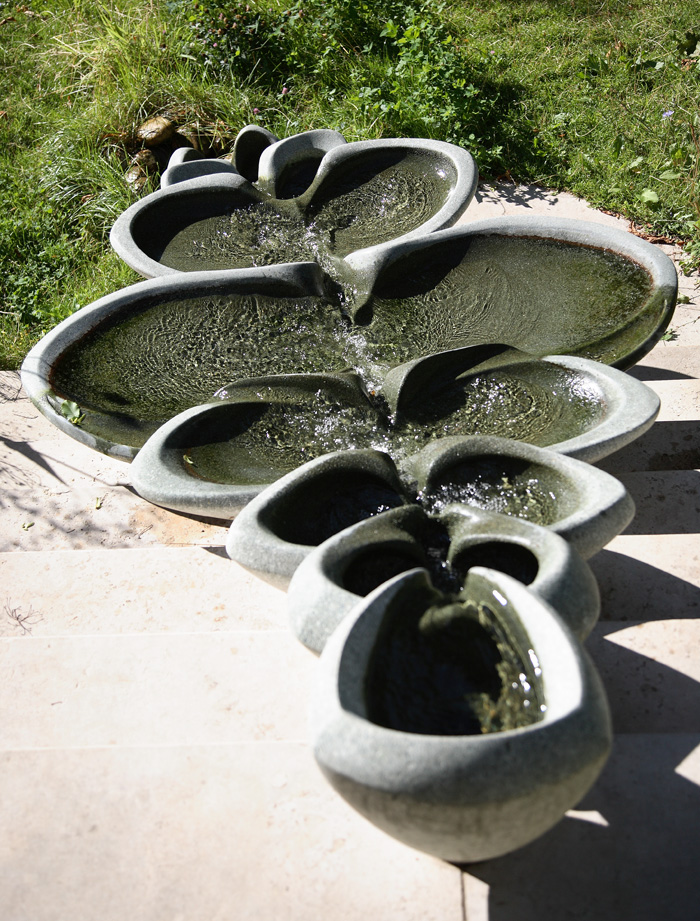
Flowforms in Darmstadt, Germany

- Phenomenological approaches to science, pseudo-scientific ideas based on Goethe's philosophy of nature.
- John Wilkes' fountain-like flowforms, sculptural forms that guide water into rhythmic movement for the purposes of decoration.
- Antisemitic legislation in Italy (1938–1945); "actively contribute to the deportation of Jews to Nazi extermination camps."
- The Fellowship Community in Chestnut Ridge, New York, United States, which includes a retirement community and other anthroposophic projects.
- The Harduf kibbutz in Israel.

== Social goals ==
For a period after World War I, Steiner was extremely active and well known in Germany, in part because he lectured widely proposing social reforms. Steiner was a sharp critic of nationalism, which he saw as outdated, and a proponent of achieving social solidarity through individual freedom. A petition proposing a radical change in the German constitution and expressing his basic social ideas (signed by Hermann Hesse, among others) was widely circulated. His main book on social reform is Toward Social Renewal.

Anthroposophy continues to aim at reforming society through maintaining and strengthening the independence of the spheres of cultural life, human rights and the economy. It emphasizes a particular ideal in each of these three realms of society:

- Liberty in cultural life
- Equality of rights, the sphere of legislation
- Fraternity in the economic sphere

In reality, the cultural sphere had to control the economic sphere quite a bit, and socio-political rights had to be attenuated. According to Cees Leijenhorst, "Steiner outlined his vision of a new political and social philosophy that avoids the two extremes of capitalism and socialism." Steiner did influence Italian Fascism, which exploited "his racial and anti-democratic dogma." The fascist ministers Giovanni Antonio Colonna di Cesarò (nicknamed "the Anthroposophist duke"; he became antifascist after taking part in Benito Mussolini's government) and Ettore Martinoli (leading antisemite, and general secretary of the Italian Anthroposophical Society) have openly expressed their sympathy for Rudolf Steiner. Most from the occult pro-fascist UR Group were Anthroposophists. According to Egil Asprem, "Steiner's teachings had a clear authoritarian ring, and developed a rather crass polemic against 'materialism', 'liberalism', and cultural 'degeneration'. [...] For example, anthroposophical medicine was developed to contrast with the 'materialistic' (and hence 'degenerate') medicine of the establishment." The Social Threefolding has been called a "nebulous scheme". Steiner pleaded for a hegemonic spiritual elite. "Steiner's political suggestions seems hopelessly unrealistic... moonshine..." Anthroposophy has its own political ideology, e.g. the Anthroposophic institution Demeter International advertises the political ideology of the social threefolding. The General Anthroposophical Society also does that. Steiner's ideology "awaits impatiently the demise of modern capitalism's unreasoning appetites with a view to refashioning the economy along alternative, humane, guidelines."

The resulting mélange of proposals resembled in some respects the variety of organicist and corporatist economic and political models current at the time. 27 What anthroposophists envisioned under the rubric of social threefolding ranged from vague utopias of an organic national community to straightforward calls for a völkisch state as a bulwark against the Western imposition of democracy. 28 [...] In these respects, Steiner's model amounts to an 'enlightened' variety of private property and hierarchical management under the benevolent control of a spiritual aristocracy.

— Staudenmaier (2009)

Staudenmaier notes that Steiner's speeches about the threefold order were ridden with contradictions. He preached a different ideology to workers than to business owners. For him, the threefolding was the means "to draw the working class into the societal model of a class state."

== Esoteric path ==
=== Guru ===
Many authors see Anthroposophy as having been founded by a guru (meaning Steiner). (Note: Sources for 'guru') As of 2022, during the past 100 years, Anthroposophists constantly denied this.

=== Paths of spiritual development ===
According to Steiner, a real spiritual world exists, evolving along with the material one. Steiner held that the spiritual world can be researched in the right circumstances through direct experience, by persons practicing rigorous forms of ethical and cognitive self-discipline. Steiner described many exercises he said were suited to strengthening such self-discipline; the most complete exposition of these is found in his book How To Know Higher Worlds. The aim of these exercises is to develop higher levels of consciousness through meditation and observation. Details about the spiritual world, Steiner suggested, could on such a basis be discovered and reported, though no more infallibly than the results of natural science.

Anthroposophy is a path of knowledge, to guide the spiritual in the human being to the spiritual in the universe.... Anthroposophists are those who experience, as an essential need of life, certain questions on the nature of the human being and the universe, just as one experiences hunger and thirst.

Steiner regarded his research reports as being important aids to others seeking to enter into spiritual experience. He suggested that a combination of spiritual exercises (for example, concentrating on an object such as a seed), moral development (control of thought, feelings and will combined with openness, tolerance and flexibility) and familiarity with other spiritual researchers' results would best further an individual's spiritual development. He consistently emphasised that any inner, spiritual practice should be undertaken in such a way as not to interfere with one's responsibilities in outer life. Steiner distinguished between what he considered were true and false paths of spiritual investigation.

In anthroposophy, artistic expression is also treated as a potentially valuable bridge between spiritual and material reality.

=== Prerequisites to and stages of inner development ===
A person seeking inner development must first of all make the attempt to give up certain formerly held inclinations. Then, new inclinations must be acquired by constantly holding the thought of such inclinations, virtues or characteristics in one's mind. They must be so incorporated into one's being that a person becomes enabled to alter his soul by his own will-power. This must be tried as objectively as a chemical might be tested in an experiment. A person who has never endeavored to change his soul, who has never made the initial decision to develop the qualities of endurance, steadfastness and calm logical thinking, or a person who has such decisions but has given up because he did not succeed in a week, a month, a year or a decade, will never conclude anything inwardly about these truths.

— Rudolf Steiner, "On the Inner Life",

Steiner's stated prerequisites to beginning on a spiritual path include a willingness to take up serious cognitive studies, a respect for factual evidence, and a responsible attitude. Central to progress on the path itself is a harmonious cultivation of the following qualities:

- Control over one's own thinking
- Control over one's will
- Composure
- Positivity
- Impartiality

Steiner sees meditation as a concentration and enhancement of the power of thought. By focusing consciously on an idea, feeling or intention the meditant seeks to arrive at pure thinking, a state exemplified by but not confined to pure mathematics. In Steiner's view, conventional sensory-material knowledge is achieved through relating perception and concepts. The anthroposophic path of esoteric training articulates three further stages of supersensory knowledge, which do not necessarily follow strictly sequentially in any single individual's spiritual progress.

- By focusing on symbolic patterns, images, and poetic mantras, the meditant can achieve consciously directed Imaginations that allow sensory phenomena to appear as the expression of underlying beings of a soul-spiritual nature.
- By transcending such imaginative pictures, the meditant can become conscious of the meditative activity itself, which leads to experiences of expressions of soul-spiritual beings unmediated by sensory phenomena or qualities. Steiner calls this stage Inspiration.
- By intensifying the will-forces through exercises such as a chronologically reversed review of the day's events, the meditant can achieve a further stage of inner independence from sensory experience, leading to direct contact, and even union, with spiritual beings ("Intuition") without loss of individual awareness.

=== Spiritual exercises ===
Steiner described numerous exercises he believed would bring spiritual development; other anthroposophists have added many others. A central principle is that "for every step in spiritual perception, three steps are to be taken in moral development." According to Steiner, moral development reveals the extent to which one has achieved control over one's inner life and can exercise it in harmony with the spiritual life of other people; it shows the real progress in spiritual development, the fruits of which are given in spiritual perception. It also guarantees the capacity to distinguish between false perceptions or illusions (which are possible in perceptions of both the outer world and the inner world) and true perceptions: i.e., the capacity to distinguish in any perception between the influence of subjective elements (i.e., viewpoint) and objective reality.

== Place in Western philosophy ==
Steiner built upon Goethe's conception of an imaginative power capable of synthesizing the sense-perceptible form of a thing (an image of its outer appearance) and the concept we have of that thing (an image of its inner structure or nature). Steiner added to this the conception that a further step in the development of thinking is possible when the thinker observes his or her own thought processes. "The organ of observation and the observed thought process are then identical, so that the condition thus arrived at is simultaneously one of perception through thinking and one of thought through perception."

Thus, in Steiner's view, we can overcome the subject-object divide through inner activity, even though all human experience begins by being conditioned by it. In this connection, Steiner examines the step from thinking determined by outer impressions to what he calls sense-free thinking. He characterizes thoughts he considers without sensory content, such as mathematical or logical thoughts, as free deeds. Steiner believed he had thus located the origin of free will in our thinking, and in particular in sense-free thinking.

Some of the epistemic basis for Steiner's later anthroposophical work is contained in the seminal work, Philosophy of Freedom. In his early works, Steiner sought to overcome what he perceived as the dualism of Cartesian idealism and Kantian subjectivism by developing Goethe's conception of the human being as a natural-supernatural entity, that is: natural in that humanity is a product of nature, supernatural in that through our conceptual powers we extend nature's realm, allowing it to achieve a reflective capacity in us as philosophy, art and science. Steiner was one of the first European philosophers to overcome the subject-object split in Western thought. Though not well known among philosophers, his philosophical work was taken up by Owen Barfield (and through him influenced the Inklings, an Oxford group of Christian writers that included J. R. R. Tolkien and C. S. Lewis).

Christian and Jewish mystical thought have also influenced the development of anthroposophy.

=== Union of science and spirit ===
Steiner believed in the possibility of applying the clarity of scientific thinking to spiritual experience, which he saw as deriving from an objectively existing spiritual world. Steiner identified mathematics, which attains certainty through thinking itself, thus through inner experience rather than empirical observation, as the basis of his epistemology of spiritual experience.

Anthroposophy regards mainstream science as Ahrimanic. Steiner lambasted especially sociology and economics. "[H]e demonised the world promoted by scientific rationalism."

== Relationship to religion ==
=== A religion ===
C. G. Jung declared that spiritual science is as much a religion as Christian Science founded by Mrs. Eddy.

=== Esoteric School ===
The Esoteric School of the Anthroposophical Society originated, directly and indirectly, from "the many pansophical and occult groups belonging to high-grade Masonry", going through the Theosophical Society and Ordo Templi Orientis. Steiner had the Masonic degrees 33 and 95.

=== Christ as the center of earthly evolution ===
Steiner's writing, though appreciative of all religions and cultural developments, emphasizes Western tradition as having evolved to meet contemporary needs. He describes Christ and his mission on earth of bringing individuated consciousness as having a particularly important place in human evolution, whereby:

- Christianity has evolved out of previous religions;
- The being which manifests in Christianity also manifests in all faiths and religions, and each religion is valid and true for the time and cultural context in which it was born;
- All historical forms of Christianity need to be transformed considerably to meet the continuing evolution of humanity.

Spiritual science does not want to usurp the place of Christianity; on the contrary it would like to be instrumental in making Christianity understood. Thus it becomes clear to us through spiritual science that the being whom we call Christ is to be recognized as the center of life on earth, that the Christian religion is the ultimate religion for the earth's whole future. Spiritual science shows us particularly that the pre-Christian religions outgrow their one-sidedness and come together in the Christian faith. It is not the desire of spiritual science to set something else in the place of Christianity; rather it wants to contribute to a deeper, more heartfelt understanding of Christianity.

Thus, anthroposophy considers there to be a being who unifies all religions, and who is not represented by any particular religious faith. This being is, according to Steiner, not only the Redeemer of the Fall from Paradise, but also the unique pivot and meaning of earth's evolutionary processes and of human history. To describe this being, Steiner periodically used terms such as the "Representative of Humanity" or the "good spirit" rather than any denominational term.

=== Divergence from conventional Christian thought ===
Steiner's views of Christianity diverge from conventional Christian thought in key places, and include gnostic (Note: Gnosticism meaning "In the broadest sense of the term this is any spiritual teaching that says that spiritual knowledge (Greek: gnosis) or wisdom (sophia) rather than doctrinal faith (pistis) or some ritual practice is the main route to supreme spiritual attainment.") elements:

- One central point of divergence is Steiner's views on reincarnation and karma.
- Steiner differentiated three contemporary paths by which he believed it possible to arrive at Christ:
  - Through heart-felt experiences of the Gospels; Steiner described this as the historically dominant path, but becoming less important in the future.
  - Through inner experiences of a spiritual reality; this Steiner regarded as increasingly the path of spiritual or religious seekers today.
  - Through initiatory experiences whereby the reality of Christ's death and resurrection are experienced; Steiner believed this is the path people will increasingly take.
- Steiner also believed that there were two different Jesus children involved in the Incarnation of the Christ: one child descended from Solomon, as described in the Gospel of Matthew, the other child from Nathan, as described in the Gospel of Luke. (The genealogies given in the two gospels diverge some thirty generations before Jesus' birth, and 'Jesus' was a common name in biblical times.)
- His view of the second coming of Christ is also unusual; he suggested that this would not be a physical reappearance, but that the Christ being would become manifest in non-physical form, visible to spiritual vision and apparent in community life for increasing numbers of people beginning around the year 1933.
- He emphasized his belief that in the future humanity would need to be able to recognize the Spirit of Love in all its genuine forms, regardless of what name would be used to describe this being. He also warned that the traditional name of the Christ might be misused, and the true essence of this being of love ignored.

Monty Waldin notes that the two Jesus children sound heretical to mainstream Christians. Anthony Mellors states that Steiner's interpretation of the Bible is heretical. The Catholic Church considers Anthroposophy to be heretical. According to Steiner, Christ will never again have a physical body.

Theosophy, together with its continental sister, Anthroposophy... are pure Gnosticism in Hindu dress...

— C.G. Jung

According to Jane Gilmer, "Jung and Steiner were both versed in ancient gnosis and both envisioned a paradigmatic shift in the way it was delivered." As Gilles Quispel put it, "After all, Theosophy is a pagan, Anthroposophy a Christian form of modern Gnosis." Maria Carlson stated "Theosophy and Anthroposophy are fundamentally Gnostic systems in that they posit the dualism of Spirit and Matter." She also stated that Theosophy and Anthroposophy "are both modern gnostic doctrines." R. McL. Wilson in The Oxford Companion to the Bible agrees that Steiner and Anthroposophy are under the influence of gnosticism. Robert A. McDermott says Anthroposophy belongs to Christian Rosicrucianism. According to Nicholas Goodrick-Clarke, Rudolf Steiner "blended modern Theosophy with a Gnostic form of Christianity, Rosicrucianism, and German Naturphilosophie". Gary Lachman stated that Steiner stood for a "heavily Christianized version of Theosophy" and "Christianized occult science". Nicholas Goodrick-Clarke described Anthroposophy as a [modern] offshoot of Ancient Gnosticism, especially of "the aeons of the Valentinian pleroma". Geoffrey Ahern states that Anthroposophy belongs to neo-gnosticism broadly conceived, which he identifies with Western esotericism and occultism. Stefanie von Schnurbein briefly agrees that Steiner propagated Gnostic Christianity.

Was Steiner a Gnostic? Yes and no. Yes, from the point of view that he offered insights and methods for a personal experience of Christ. I have formulated this aspect of his work as his hermeneutical key: 'not I, but Christ in me'. No, from the point of view that he was not trying to reestablish Gnosticism's practices into a neo-gnostic tradition. Steiner was, in his times, well aware of concerns articulated more recently by Pope Francis about the two subtle enemies of holiness, contemporary Gnosticism and contemporary Pelagianism.

— Samson 2023, p. 180

Granted that Steiner included Gnostic elements in his cosmological reinterpretation of Christianity, many of them from the Pistis Sophia, Steiner was not a Gnostic in the sense of someone who held that the world was ruled by a demiurge, that matter was evil, or that it was possible to escape from this fallen universe by acquiring secret spiritual knowledge. To characterize the structure of his thought as derived from Syrio-Egyptian gnosis (Ahern 2010) may be too strong and plays down the fact that he was critical of early Gnostic Christianity as having no adequate idea of Jesus as a man of flesh and blood.

— Hudson 2019, p. 510

According to Steiner, "Christ's role is to ease the transition to the Age of Aquarius, while for Gnostics, his task was to save humanity from God". Elizabeth Dipple stated that Rudolf Steiner's system was a "neo-Platonic, semi-Gnostic, occult anthroposophical system [...] with its allegiance to mystical Christianity, Rosicrucianism and certain versions of spiritualism [...]". According to Heiner Ullrich, Steiner's point of view was that of a "neo-Platonic gnostic". Gareth Knight agrees that Steiner was neo-Platonic. Brandt and Hammer describe Steiner's anthropology (spirit, soul, and body) as neo-Platonic. Carl Abrahamsson stated that Steiner posited a gnostic Christ. Steiner's theology is "redemption through sin", he accuses good Christians of killing the spirit of Christianity.

According to Catholic scholars Anthroposophy belongs to the New Age. George D. Chryssides also considers Steiner to be New Age, or at least a forerunner of the New Age. John Paull considers him a New Age philosopher. Nicholas Campion says Steiner was a New Age Christian. Campion stated that "Anthroposophy is perhaps the most vibrant of New Age movements". Even allowing that Steiner himself was not New Age, an author wrote "anthroposophy—a spiritual movement that is the basis for much of the New Age thinking in Europe and North America today." Roger E. Olson and Dominic Corrywright agree. The New Age Encyclopedia lists Steiner among the luminaries of the New Age. Wouter Hanegraaff discusses two meanings of "New Age": Steiner fits one meaning, but not the other; the difference lies in the absence of the psychologization initiated by the New Thought. That is, Steiner lies at the root of New Age sensu stricto.

=== Judaism ===
Steiner's critics, on the other hand, past and present, see him at best as a pseudo-scientist who was delusional and possibly mentally unstable in believing that he had accessed Kant's realm of the noumenon, or at worst as someone who laid the groundwork for Hitler and National Socialism.

— Aaron French (2025)

Rudolf Steiner was an extreme pan-German nationalist, and never disavowed such stance. "Steiner was a member of a völkisch Wagner club, and anthroposophist authors endorsed Wagner's views on race." "Steiner, along with Hübbe-Schleiden and Hartmann, was affiliated with the racist and anti-Semitic Guido von List Society. For many anthroposophists in fact, 'Jewishness signified the very antithesis of spiritual progress and the epitome of modern debasement.'" The theories of theosophy and anthroposophy were "later co-opted by National Socialism". Rudolf Steiner wrote and lectured on Judaism and Jewish issues over much of his adult life. He was a fierce opponent of popular antisemitism, but asserted that there was no justification for the existence of Judaism and Jewish culture in the modern world, a radical assimilationist perspective which saw the Jews completely integrating into the larger society. He also supported Émile Zola's position in the Dreyfus affair. Steiner emphasized Judaism's central importance to the constitution of the modern era in the West but suggested that to appreciate the spirituality of the future it would need to overcome its tendency toward abstraction. Steiner financed the publication of the book Die Entente-Freimaurerei und der Weltkrieg (1919) by Karl Heise; Steiner also wrote the foreword for the book, partly based upon his own ideas. The publication comprised a conspiracy theory according to whom World War I was a consequence of a collusion of Freemasons and Jews – still favorite scapegoats of the conspiracy theorists – their purpose being the destruction of Germany. Fact is that Steiner spent a large sum of money for publishing "a now classic work of anti-Masonry and anti-Judaism". The writing was later enthusiastically received by the Nazi Party.

In his later life, Steiner was accused by the Nazis of being Jewish, and Adolf Hitler called anthroposophy "Jewish methods". The anthroposophical institutions in Germany were banned during Nazi rule and several anthroposophists sent to concentration camps. Later, the non-Aryan, the non-German, and the antifascist members of the direction board of the Anthroposophical Society were purged from it; it is unclear if that happened due to Nazi ideology or for other reasons, but the purge clearly brought the Anthroposophic Society closer to Nazism. Important early anthroposophists who were Jewish included two central members on the executive boards of the precursors to the modern Anthroposophical Society, and Karl König, the founder of the Camphill movement, who had converted to Christianity. Martin Buber and Hugo Bergmann, who viewed Steiner's social ideas as a solution to the Arab–Jewish conflict, were also influenced by anthroposophy. There are numerous anthroposophical organisations in Israel, including the anthroposophical kibbutz Harduf, founded by Jesaiah Ben-Aharon, forty Waldorf kindergartens and seventeen Waldorf schools (as of 2018). A number of these organizations are striving to foster positive relationships between the Arab and Jewish populations: The Harduf Waldorf school includes both Jewish and Arab faculty and students, and has extensive contact with the surrounding Arab communities, while the first joint Arab-Jewish kindergarten was a Waldorf program in Hilf near Haifa.

=== Christian Community ===
Towards the end of Steiner's life, a group of theology students (primarily Lutheran, with some Roman Catholic members) approached Steiner for help in reviving Christianity, in particular "to bridge the widening gulf between modern science and the world of spirit". They approached a notable Lutheran pastor, Friedrich Rittelmeyer, who was already working with Steiner's ideas, to join their efforts. Out of their co-operative endeavor, the Movement for Religious Renewal, now generally known as The Christian Community, was born. Steiner emphasized that he considered this movement, and his role in creating it, to be independent of his anthroposophical work, as he wished anthroposophy to be independent of any particular religion or religious denomination.

== Reception ==
=== Supporters and critics ===
Anthroposophy's supporters include Saul Bellow, Selma Lagerlöf, Andrei Bely, Joseph Beuys, Owen Barfield, architect Walter Burley Griffin, Wassily Kandinsky, Andrei Tarkovsky, Bruno Walter, Right Livelihood Award winners Sir George Trevelyan, and Ibrahim Abouleish, and child psychiatrist Eva Frommer.

The historian of religion Olav Hammer has termed anthroposophy "the most important esoteric society in European history." However authors, scientists, and physicians including Michael Shermer, Michael Ruse, Edzard Ernst, David Gorski, and Simon Singh have criticized anthroposophy's application in the areas of medicine, biology, agriculture, and education to be dangerous and pseudoscientific. Others including former Waldorf pupil Dan Dugan and historian Geoffrey Ahern have criticized anthroposophy itself as a dangerous quasi-religious movement that is fundamentally anti-rational and anti-scientific. Zaleski and Zaleski wrote: "Steiner rewrote the history of the world, describing lost ages and unknown civilizations....He filled in this historical framework with teachings about reincarnation, karma, the astral planes, the Akashic Record, and other familiar elements in the European occultist's kit."

=== Scientific basis ===
Though Rudolf Steiner studied natural science at the Vienna Technical University at the undergraduate level, his doctorate was in epistemology and very little of his work is directly concerned with the empirical sciences. In his mature work, when he did refer to science it was often to present phenomenological or Goethean science as an alternative to what he considered the materialistic science of his contemporaries.

Steiner's primary interest was in applying the methodology of science to realms of inner experience and the spiritual worlds (his appreciation that the essence of science is its method of inquiry is unusual among esotericists), and Steiner called anthroposophy Geisteswissenschaft (science of the mind, cultural/spiritual science), a term generally used in German to refer to the humanities and social sciences.

Whether this is a sufficient basis for anthroposophy to be considered a spiritual science has been a matter of controversy. As Freda Easton explained in her study of Waldorf schools, "Whether one accepts anthroposophy as a science depends upon whether one accepts Steiner's interpretation of a science that extends the consciousness and capacity of human beings to experience their inner spiritual world."

Sven Ove Hansson has disputed anthroposophy's claim to a scientific basis, stating that its ideas are not empirically derived and neither reproducible nor testable. Carlo Willmann points out that as, on its own terms, anthroposophical methodology offers no possibility of being falsified except through its own procedures of spiritual investigation, no intersubjective validation is possible by conventional scientific methods; it thus cannot stand up to empiricist critics. Peter Schneider describes such objections as untenable, asserting that if a non-sensory, non-physical realm exists, then according to Steiner the experiences of pure thinking possible within the normal realm of consciousness would already be experiences of that, and it would be impossible to exclude the possibility of empirically grounded experiences of other supersensory content.

Olav Hammer suggests that anthroposophy carries scientism "to lengths unparalleled in any other Esoteric position" due to its dependence upon claims of clairvoyant experience, its subsuming natural science under "spiritual science". Hammer also asserts that the development of what he calls "fringe" sciences such as anthroposophic medicine and biodynamic agriculture are justified partly on the basis of the ethical and ecological values they promote, rather than purely on a scientific basis.

Though Steiner saw that spiritual vision itself is difficult for others to achieve, he recommended open-mindedly exploring and rationally testing the results of such research; he also urged others to follow a spiritual training that would allow them directly to apply his methods to achieve comparable results.

Anthony Storr stated about Rudolf Steiner's Anthroposophy: "His belief system is so eccentric, so unsupported by evidence, so manifestly bizarre, that rational skeptics are bound to consider it delusional... But, whereas Einstein's way of perceiving the world by thought became confirmed by experiment and mathematical proof, Steiner's remained intensely subjective and insusceptible of objective confirmation."

According to Dan Dugan, Steiner was a champion of the following pseudoscientific claims, also championed by Waldorf schools:

1. wrong color theory;
2. obtuse criticism of the theory of relativity;
3. weird ideas about motions of the planets;
4. supporting vitalism;
5. doubting germ theory;
6. weird approach to physiological systems;
7. "the heart is not a pump".

The epistemology offered by anthroposophy represents a regression to pre-scientific modes of thought. Ullrich stated that its epistemology is "rationalized mysticism". Others stated that anthroposophy is "an arcane pseudoscience based on medieval mysticism". Another author stated that it is "Rudolf Steiner's innovative doctrine that combined fashionable mysticism with no less fashionable pseudoscience." A French author wrote that Anthroposophy "is a clever mix of pseudoscience, esotericism and mysticism".

Another author stated anthroposophy is "Gnostic scientism". According to C. G. Jung, the monicker "spiritual science" serves to mask its religious nature.

=== Religious nature ===
Two German scholars have called Anthroposophy "the most successful form of 'alternative' religion in the [twentieth] century." Other scholars stated that Anthroposophy is "aspiring to the status of religious dogma". According to Maria Carlson, anthroposophy is a "positivistic religion" "offering a seemingly logical theology based on pseudoscience."

According to Swartz, Brandt, Hammer, Hansson, and others Anthroposophy is a religion. They also call it "settled new religious movement", while Martin Gardner and others called it a cult. Another scholar also calls it a new religious movement or a new spiritual movement. Already in 1924 Anthroposophy got labeled "new religious movement" and "occultist movement". Other scholars agree it is a new religious movement. According to Helmut Zander, both the theory and practice of Anthroposophy display characteristics of religion, and, according to Zander, Rudolf Steiner would plead no contest. Another author states that the question whether Anthroposophy is a religion cannot be answered by "Yes" or "No".

According to Zander, Steiner's book Geheimwissenschaft [Occult Science] contains Steiner's mythology about cosmogenesis. Hammer notices that Anthroposophy is a synthesis which does include occultism. Hammer also notices that Steiner's occult doctrines bear a strong resemblance to post-Blavatskyan Theosophy (e.g. Annie Besant and Charles Webster Leadbeater). According to Helmut Zander, Steiner's clairvoyant insights always developed according to the same pattern. He took revised texts from theosophical literature and then passed them off as his own higher insights. Because he did not want to be an occult storyteller, but a (spiritual) scientist, he adapted his reading, which he had seen supernaturally in the world's memory, to the current state of technology. When, for example, the Wright brothers began flying with gliders and eventually with motorized aircraft in 1903, Steiner transformed the ponderous gondola airships of his Atlantis story into airplanes with elevators and rudders in 1904.

As an explicitly spiritual movement, anthroposophy has sometimes been called a religious philosophy. In 1998 People for Legal and Non-Sectarian Schools (PLANS) started a lawsuit alleging that anthroposophy is a religion for Establishment Clause purposes and therefore several California school districts should not be chartering Waldorf schools; the lawsuit was dismissed in 2012 for failure to show anthroposophy was a religion. A 2012 paper in legal science reports this verdict as being provisional, and disagrees with its result, i.e. anthroposophy was declared "not a religion" due to an outdated legal framework. Another author disagrees with the point of that paper. Yet another author agrees with the point of that paper. In 2000, a French court ruled that a government minister's description of anthroposophy as a cult was defamatory. The French governmental anti-cults agency MIVILUDES reported that it remains vigilant about Anthroposophy, especially because of its deviant medical applications and its work with underage persons, and that the works of Grégoire Perra which lambast anthroposophical medicine do not constitute defamation. Anthroposophical MDs think diseases are caused primarily by karma and demons, rather than materialistic causes. The Gospel of Luke is their main handbook of medical science; this makes them believe they have magical powers, and that medicine is essentially a form of magic. The professional French organization of Anthroposophic MDs have sued Mr. Perra for such claims; they have been condemned to pay 25,000 Euros damages for abusively suing him.

Julian Rivers stated that is by no means easy to tell whether the Steiner schools are religious schools. The Anthroposophist N.C. Thomas denies that Anthroposophy is a religion. Joel Beversluis recognizes that is what Anthroposophists claim. Two Marxist-Leninist German scholars say Anthroposophy is semi-religious. James A. Santucci says Anthroposophy is based upon esoteric Christianity. Scholars state that Anthroposophy is influenced by Christian Gnosticism. The Catholic Church did in 1919 issue an edict classifying Anthroposophy as "a neognostic heresy" despite the fact that Steiner "very well respected the distinctions on which Catholic dogma insists". The secular scholar Joan Braune agrees that Anthroposophy is Gnosticism.

Some Baptist and mainstream academical heresiologists still appear inclined to agree with the more narrow prior edict of 1919 on dogma and the Lutheran (Missouri Sinod) apologist and heresiologist Eldon K. Winker quoted Ron Rhodes that Steiner's Christology is very similar to Cerinthus. Steiner did perceive "a distinction between the human person Jesus, and Christ as the divine Logos", which could be construed as Gnostic but not Docetic, since "they do not believe the Christ departed from Jesus prior to the crucfixion". "Steiner's Christology is discussed as a central element of his thought in Johannes Hemleben, Rudolf Steiner: A Documentary Biography, trans. Leo Twyman (East Grinstead, Sussex: Henry Goulden, 1975), pp. 96-100. From the perspective of orthodox Christianity, it may be said that Steiner combined a docetic understanding of Christ's nature with the Adoptionist heresy." Older scholarship says Steiner's Christology is Nestorian. According to Egil Asprem, "Steiner's Christology was, however, quite heterodox, and hardly compatible with official church doctrine."

George Bălan wrote "Even before Nazism and communism, Eastern Orthodoxy and Catholicism had declared war on anthroposophy for daring to step into territory considered the privileged domain of the Church." According to Carl Raschke anthroposophy is pantheism. An evangelical author agrees that Steiner was close to pantheism. Steiner's Anthroposophy influenced the Russian theologians Pavel Florensky and Sergei Bulgakov. Peter Staudenmaier agrees that the anthroposophical "figure of Christ ... is decidedly unorthodox".

=== Statements on race ===
Some anthroposophical ideas challenged the National Socialist racialist and nationalistic agenda. In contrast, some American educators have criticized Waldorf schools for failing to equally include the fables and myths of all cultures, instead favoring European stories over African ones.

- From the mid-1930s on, National Socialist ideologues attacked the anthroposophical worldview as being opposed to Nazi racist and nationalistic principles; anthroposophy considered "Blood, Race and Folk" as primitive instincts that must be overcome.
- An academic analysis of the educational approach in public schools noted that "[A] naive version of the evolution of consciousness, a theory foundational to both Steiner's anthroposophy and Waldorf education, sometimes places one race below another in one or another dimension of development. It is easy to imagine why there are disputes [...] about Waldorf educators' insisting on teaching Norse tales and Greek myths to the exclusion of African modes of discourse."

In response to such critiques, the Anthroposophical Society in America published in 1998 a statement clarifying its stance:

We explicitly reject any racial theory that may be construed to be part of Rudolf Steiner's writings. The Anthroposophical Society in America is an open, public society and it rejects any purported spiritual or scientific theory on the basis of which the alleged superiority of one race is justified at the expense of another race.

Tommy Wieringa, a Dutch writer who grew among Anthroposophists, commenting upon an essay by the Anthroposophist Désanne van Brederode, he wrote "It was a meeting of old acquaintances: Nazi leaders such as Rudolf Hess and Heinrich Himmler already recognized a kindred spirit in Rudolf Steiner, with his theories about racial purity, esoteric medicine and biodynamic agriculture." The racism of Anthroposophy is spiritual and paternalistic (i.e. benevolent), while the racism of fascism is materialistic and often malign. Olav Hammer, university professor expert in new religious movements and Western esotericism, confirms that now the racist and anti-Semitic character of Steiner's teachings can no longer be denied, even if that is "spiritual racism". According to Munoz, in the materialist perspective (i.e. no reincarnations), Anthroposophy is racist, but in the spiritual perspective (i.e. reincarnations mandatory) it is not racist.

One crucial stumbling block for English language readers is the anthroposophical tendency to delete racist and antisemitic passages from translated editions of Steiner's publications.

— Peter Staudenmaier (2009)

Two Marxist-Leninist German scholars say Steiner was racist and reactionary. According to the Waldorf teacher Sune Nordwall, "membership in the Anthroposophical Society is incompatible with membership in any organization advocating nationalist or racists ideals." According to Hansson, speaking about Steiner, "His statements about race are integrated with other elements of his spiritual worldview, from which they cannot easily be separated."

=== Reception by Nazi regime in Germany ===
Though several prominent members of the Nazi Party were supporters of anthroposophy and its movements, including agriculturalist Erhard Bartsch, SS colonel Hermann Schneider, and Gestapo chief Heinrich Müller, anti-Nazis such as Traute Lafrenz, a member of the White Rose resistance movement, were also followers. Rudolf Hess, the adjunct Führer, was a patron of Waldorf schools and a staunch defender of biodynamic agriculture. "Before 1933, Himmler, Walther Darré (the future Reich Agriculture Minister), and Rudolf Höss (the future commandant of Auschwitz) had studied ariosophy and anthroposophy, belonged to the occult-inspired Artamanen movement, [...]" "One of the most insightful contributions to this area is Peter Staudenmaier's case study of Anthroposophy, which has demonstrated the ambiguous role of Anthroposophists in fascist Italy and Nazi Germany." According to Staudenmaier, the fascist and Nazi authorities saw occultism not as deviant, but as deeply familiar.

== See also ==
- Esoteric Christianity
- Esotericism in Germany and Austria
- Pneumatosophy
- Spiritual but not religious
