= Pneumatosophy =

Philosophical concept developed by Rudolf Steiner

From the anthroposophy teachings of Rudolf Steiner, "Pneumatosophy" (wisdom of the spirit) can be seen as part of his teachings on spiritual science. He approaches the human spirit in terms of truth and error and the meaning and effects of imagination, intuition, and inspiration.

In some cases it will be difficult to understand the context between the subject matter and what is here termed pneumatosophy. The (Greek) "pneuma" means "breath" or "wind". In the Bible it is usually translated as "spirit". The suffix "sophy" stands for knowledge.

== See also ==
- Esoteric Christianity
- Mysticism
- Psychosophy
- Theosophy
