= Camphill Svetlana =

Therapeutic intentional community in Russia

Camphill Svetlana Village is a therapeutic intentional community of nearly 40 residents in Russia serving people with special needs or disabilities. It was established in 1992 and is part of the international Camphill Movement.

== Facilities ==
Camphill Svetlana is located on 57 hectares of land, about 140 km east of Saint Petersburg, near Lake Ladoga. The community currently consists of three houses, a farm building housing cattle and other livestock, and an adjoining dairy to process the milk. The village's primary activity is agriculture. Other activities include gardening, a bakery and a doll-making workshop.

== History ==
Camphill Svetlana Village was founded by Norwegian Margit Engel and Michael Michaelov of St Petersburg and received significant financial support from the Norwegian Camphill Village Trust and the Bennett Trust of Norway. In 1994, a 20-room prefabricated house was brought from Norway and assembled in a few weeks. The house was subsequently named Fridtjof Nansen House, in honor of the Norwegian explorer and diplomat who intervened to alleviate famine in Russia in the early 1920s.

The village participates on a regional level in an association of Village Communities from Norway, Sweden, Finland, Estonia and Latvia which provides mutual support on cultural, educational, social and practical levels.
