= The Abbey (1995 TV series) =

- Directed by: Jonathan Stedall
- Starring: Alan Bennett
- Country of origin: United Kingdom
- Original language: English

Production
- Producer: Andrew Holmes
- Cinematography: Mike Fox
- Editor: Pip Heywood
- Running time: 180 min. (Three 60 min. episodes)

Original release
- Network: BBC TV
- Release: 1995 – 1995

The Abbey (1995) – or The Abbey with Alan Bennett – is a three-part BBC TV documentary written and hosted by playwright Alan Bennett and directed by Jonathan Stedall. It is a personal tribute to, and tour of, Westminster Abbey.

This film is the video equivalent of an erudite tourist visit and is structured as "a day in the life" of the Abbey. Bennett's presentation has been criticized as at times painfully slow, wry, and effete, but it includes a wealth of amusing and informative anecdotes, citations, and historical fact.

== Episodes ==
- Programme One, A Royal Peculiar (56 minutes) offers a thorough tour of the Abbey. Bennett watches the early morning rituals of the "Abbey family," the people who tune the organ, dust the statues, deliver the milk, attend the first service of the day, and provides a general introduction to the layout and history of the place. Later, mingling with the public tours, he visits some of the multitude of graves in the Abbey, including those of Edward the Confessor, Chaucer, Mary, Queen of Scots, and the Tomb of the Unknown Warrior. He cites "the English liking for clubs" in the burial groupings, with architects in one corner, poets in another, and engineers in yet another. Westminster Abbey, as he observes, is "the Queen's Parish Church"–a "royal peculiar," answerable not to the Archbishop of Canterbury and the Church of England, but directly to the British sovereign.
- Programme Two, Whom Would You Like to Be Seen Dead With? (53 minutes) Bennett's saunter through a day in the life of the Abbey continues with visits to those interred or commemorated in the poet's corner, including Lord Olivier, Lord Byron, the Brontë sisters, and Jane Austen. It is revealed that many notables have had several different resting places—successive kings and queens would often re-arrange them according to their own preferences. Ongoing preservation efforts that maintain the building are examined. Bennett takes viewers high up in the north transept, as the head woodsmith and his crew battle dampness and woodworm within the fabric of the building.
- Programme Three, A Mirror of England (50 minutes) visits the spot where every British monarch has been crowned since 1066 A.D. Bennett observes the Abbey's quiet evening rituals after the tourists have left – the boys' choir practice, a private tour given by the dean, and compline, the last service of the day. Bennett explores the ceremonial role of the Abbey within the Anglican Church, the room where the King James Version of the Bible was translated, and some of the many sculptures that decorate the Abbey's tombs. He presents a rare view of the 13th-century "Great Pavement" (the "Cosmati pavement"), the beautiful mosaic flooring, usually covered, on which the Chair of State (King Edward's Chair) stands at the Coronation. We learn that half of the Abbey day is spent preparing for Evensong, its main, daily service. Awaiting their moment, the Abbey's lay vicars play darts upstairs while the choristers practice their singing. Then, we find ourselves alone with Bennett in the dead of night pondering the observation made by 19th-century Dean Stanley, that Westminster Abbey is a "mirror of England." He concludes, "If we reflect that this unique place and its contents are what remains when greed, theft, violence, and occasional vindictiveness have done their work, but mitigated by an obstinate tradition of charity, tolerance, and magnanimity, then perhaps it is...or one may hope that it is...indeed a mirror of England."

== Production and distribution ==
Executive producer, John Drury; producer, Andrew Holmes; editor, Pip Heywood; director of photography, Mike Fox; sound, Keith Richardson. 180 minutes.

In 1996, the documentary was broadcast by PBS in the US in a 90-minute version called Westminster Abbey.
