= Karl König =

Austrian paediatrician (1902–1966)

- Born: 25 September 1902; Vienna, Austria-Hungary
- Died: 27 March 1966 (aged 63); Brachenreuthe near Überlingen, West Germany
- Education: University of Vienna
- Known for: Founder of the Camphill Movement
- Scientific career
- Fields: Paediatrics/Learning disability
- Workplaces: Camphill communities
- Website: karlkoeniginstitute.org

Karl König (25 September 1902 – 27 March 1966) was an Austrian paediatrician who founded the Camphill Movement, an international movement of therapeutic intentional communities for those with special needs or disabilities.

== Biography ==
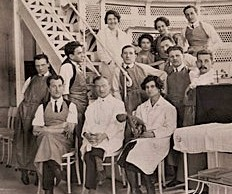
Karl König with his professors in Vienna, 1925

König was born in Vienna, in Austria-Hungary, on 25 September 1902, the only son of a Jewish shoemaker. He studied medicine at the University of Vienna and graduated in 1927 with a special interest in embryology. After graduating, he was invited by Ita Wegman to work in her Klinisch-Therapeutisches Institut, an institute for people with special needs in Arlesheim, Switzerland. He married Mathilde Maasberg in 1929.

König was appointed paediatrician at the Rudolf Steiner-inspired Schloß Pilgrimshain institute in Strzegom, where he worked until 1936 when he returned to Vienna and set up a successful medical practice. In 1938 he was forced to flee Vienna due to Hitler's invasion of Austria and relocated, at Dr. Wegman's suggestion, to Aberdeen, Scotland, where she had friends who could help recommence his work.

He was briefly interned due to the outbreak of World War II, but on his release in 1940, he set up the first Camphill Community for Children in Need of Special Care at Camphill, by Milltimber, on the outskirts of Aberdeen. At this time, he was supported also by George MacLeod, founder of the Iona Community. From the mid-1950s, König set up more communities, including the first to care for those with special needs beyond school age in North Yorkshire. During this time, he worked with pioneering music therapist Maria Schüppel.

In 1964, König moved to Brachenreuthe, near Überlingen on Lake Constance, Germany, where he set up a community. He died there in 1966.

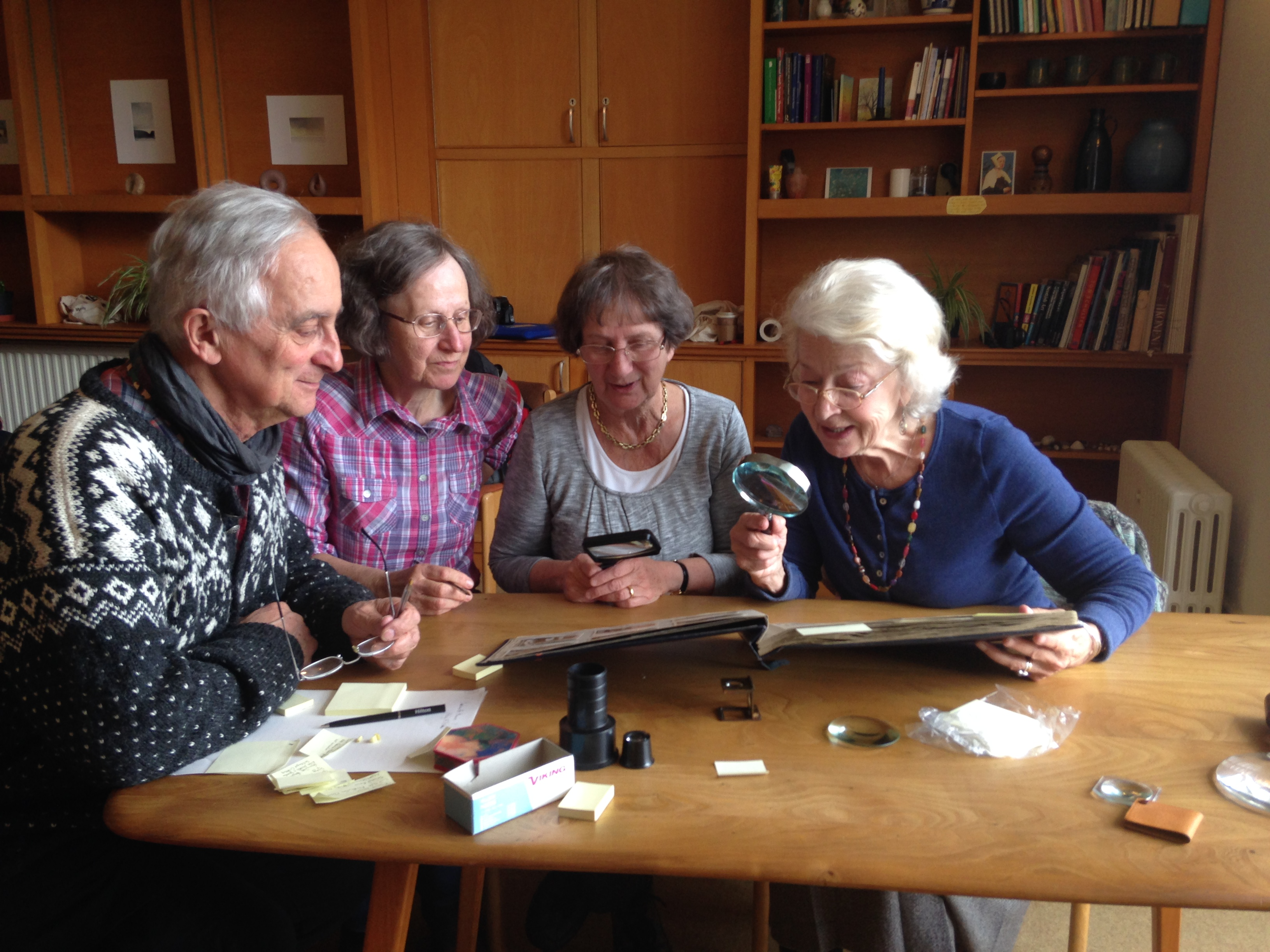
Karl König Institute & Archive

An archive of his writings is held by the Karl König Institute, a non-profit organisation in Berlin.

== See also ==
- Anthroposophy
- List of Camphill Communities

== Bibliography ==
- Berger, Manfred: Karl König – Sein Leben und Wirken, In: heilpaedagogik.de, 18 2003/H. 3, S. 21-24
- Jackson, Robin: Holistic Special Education: Camphill Principles and Practice. Edinburgh : Floris Books. 2006. ISBN 0-86315-547-2.
- Jackson, Robin: The Camphill Movement: the vision of Karl Konig. Encounter: Education for Meaning and Social Justice, 19(3), 45–48. 2006
- Jackson, Robin: Dr Karl Konig: a brief survey of his extraordinary early years. 'Scottish Medical Journal', 59(2): 122–125. 2014.
- Jackson, Robin: Karl Konig: the Austrian refugee doctor who founded a worldwide movement in Scotland. 'Scottish Medical Journal', 58(2): 124–127. 2013.
- Jackson, Robin: Karl Konig, Stanley Segal and Herbert Gunzburg: pioneers in the field of intellectual disability. 'International Journal of Developmental Disabilities', 59(1): 47–60. 2013.
- Müller-Wiedemann, Hans: Karl König: e. mitteleuropäische Biographie im 20. Jahrhundert. Stuttgart : Verl. Freies Geistesleben, 1992. ISBN 3-7725-1153-8
- Schmalenbach, Bernhard: König, Karl. In: Plato, Bodo von (Hrsg.): Anthroposophie im 20. Jahrhundert : ein Kulturimpuls in biografischen Porträts. Dornach : Verlag am Goetheanum, 2003. ISBN 3-7235-1199-6
- Selg, Peter: Anfänge anthroposophischer Heilkunst. Ita Wegman, Friedrich Husemann, Eugen Kolisko, Frederik Willem Zeylmans van Emmichoven, Karl König, Gerhard Kienle. (Pioniere der Anthroposophie; Band 18). Dornach: Philosophisch-Anthroposophischer Verlag am Goetheanum, 2000. ISBN 3-7235-1088-4
- Selg, Peter: (Ed.) Karl König’s Path into Anthroposophy. Reflections from his Diaries. Floris Books, Edinburgh 2008
- Selg, Peter: (Ed.) Ita Wegman and Karl König. Letters and Documents, Floris Books, Edinburgh 2008.
- Selg, Peter: (Ed.) Karl König: My Task: Autobiography and Biographies, Floris Books, Edinburgh 2008.
- Selg, Peter: (Ed.) Karl König: The Child with Special Needs: Letters and Essays on Curative Education, Floris Books, Edinburgh 2009.
- Karl König: Die ersten drei Jahre des Kindes, Verlag Freies Geistesleben, Stuttgart, Zeist 1977, ISBN 90 6038 078 9,
