= The Burke Special =

- Presented by: James Burke
- Country of origin: United Kingdom
- Original language: English
- No. of series: 5
- No. of episodes: 37

Production
- Producers: John M. Mansfield; Martin Freeth
- Editor: Michael Blakstad
- Running time: 30 minutes 90 minutes (special)

Original release
- Network: BBC1
- Release: 15 June 1972 – 13 May 1976

The Burke Special is a television series broadcast on BBC1 in the United Kingdom from 15 June 1972 to 13 May 1976.

The host was James Burke. The show had a "circus" format, with Burke on a radio microphone walking around interacting with a studio audience that surrounded him on three sides.

The editor for all episodes was Michael Blakstad. Producers were John M. Mansfield and Martin Freeth.

== Series one ==
15 June 1972 to 27 July 1972 (seven episodes of thirty minutes each).

== Series two ==
8 March 1973 to 19 April 1973 (seven episodes of thirty mintutes each) at 8.30 pm to 9 pm on BBC1.

Thursday 8 March 1973
"Every minute of the day things are happening that will, sooner or later, change our lives. They're like parts of a jigsaw.
It's only when the picture comes together that you know if you like it or not.
It used to be you could afford to wait and see. Not anymore. Tomorrow comes too fast. That's why this programme puts the picture together ahead of time."

James Burke starred on the front cover of the Radio Times and had his futurologist cover story on page six.

== Series three ==
21 June 1973 to 26 July 1973 (six episodes of thirty minutes each).

== Series four ==
21 March 1974 to 6 June 1974, excluding 2 May 1974 (ten episodes of thirty minutes each).

== Series five ==
8 April 1976 to 13 May 1976 (six episodes of thirty minutes each) at 8.30 pm to 9 pm on BBC1.

== Archive status ==
With the exception of series five, which reportedly exists complete, almost none of the programmes has been retained.
