= Botton, North Yorkshire =

Village in North Yorkshire, England

Coordinates: 54.42746°N 0.92863°W

Botton
- Location within North Yorkshire
- OS grid reference: NZ696040
- Unitary authority: North Yorkshire
- Ceremonial county: North Yorkshire
- Region: Yorkshire and the Humber
- Country: England
- Sovereign state: United Kingdom
- Post town: WHITBY
- Postcode district: YO21
- Police: North Yorkshire
- Fire: North Yorkshire
- Ambulance: Yorkshire
- UK Parliament: Scarborough and Whitby

Botton is a small village within the North York Moors National Park in North Yorkshire, England. A Camphill Community which supports people with learning disabilities is a major feature of the village.

== The origins of Botton Village ==
Founded in 1955 Botton Village was the first Camphill centre to offer supported living opportunities to adults with learning disabilities and other complex needs. Botton Village currently supports 60 people in their supported living services. There are 48 properties in total at Botton Village, including a mix of shared supported living households. There are organic social farms located around the village. The community works together on these farms, each person contributing according to his or her ability.

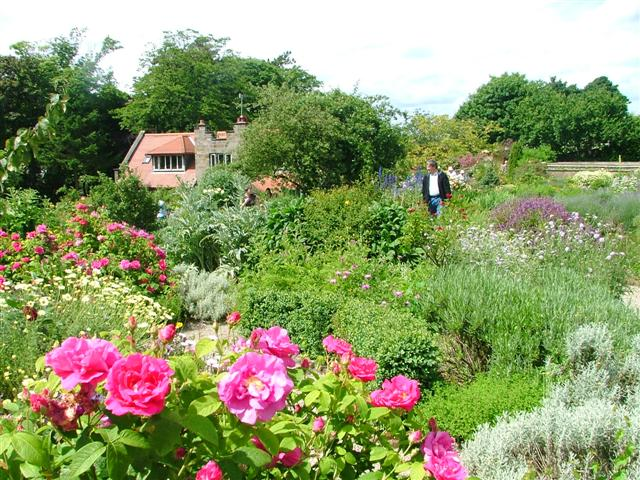
Walled Garden, Botton Hall

In the village there are many different workshops where the community members make products which are sold to the public via a number of outlets. There is a Botton Village Store which is made up of four concepts: a gift shop, a farm shop, a convenience food store, and a village grocery store. Customers can purchase items made by the community members from the workshops and items from other suppliers.

Botton village received the Deputy Prime Minister's Award for Sustainable Communities in 2005; the award cited the community's dedication to the ethos of sustainability and mutual respect, as well as their concrete achievements in these areas. Also in 2005, the village featured in a Channel 4 documentary entitled Botton, the strangest village in Britain.
