= Revolution!! =

Revolution!! (also known as The French Revolution by the National Theatre of Brent) is a 1989 television comedy film by the National Theatre of Brent, a British comedy double-act. It stars Patrick Barlow as Desmond Olivier Dingle and Jim Broadbent as Wallace, and is written by Barlow, Broadbent and Martin Duncan. It is directed by Jonathan Stedall. Desmond and Wallace act out major events of the French Revolution, portraying different characters simply by slightly changing their grey suit costumes.
