= Michael Blakstad =

British television producer

Michael Björn Blakstad, FRSA (18 April 1940 – 21 November 2023) was a British television producer who was Editor of Tomorrow's World on the BBC.

== Early life ==
Michael Björn Blakstad was born in Penang in Malaya on 18 April 1940. He was initially educated in Australia, then North Yorkshire, where he lived. He was an only child. He attended Oriel College, Oxford, where he gained a third-class BA degree in Classics.

== Career ==
=== BBC ===
Blakstad joined the BBC in 1963. In 1967 he directed the One Pair of Eyes episode "Stay Baby Stay". He became the series editor of Tomorrow's World in 1974, during what was the heyday of the series, as electronics became part of the working world. Children in Crossfire, which he wrote and produced, won an award in 1974 at the Nyon International Documentary Film Festival, now called the Visions du Réel. He was also series editor of The Burke Special, and The Risk Business, about British industry. At Tomorrow's World, he fell out with the long-established presenter Raymond Baxter, who then left the programme.

=== ITV ===
From 1969 to 1971, he was a producer with Yorkshire Television. From 1981 to 1984, he was director of programmes at Television South (TVS, the franchise from 1982 to 1992), the franchise for the current ITV Meridian (South) region.

== Personal life and death ==
Blakstad married in 1965. His wife came from Cotescue Park, and they lived in East Meon. He had a son and twin daughters. Blakstad died at a care home in Winchester on 21 November 2023, at the age of 83.

Media offices
Preceded by	Director of Programmes at Television South; 1980 - 1984	Succeeded by
Preceded by	Series Editor of Tomorrow's World; 1974 - 1980	Succeeded by
