= Summoned by Bells (film) =

- Written by: John Betjeman
- Country of origin: United Kingdom

Production
- Producer: Jonathan Stedall
- Cinematography: John McGlashan
- Editor: Shelagh Brady

Original release
- Release: 29 August 1976

Summoned by Bells is a BBC TV film of John Betjeman's verse autobiography of the same name – " a unique and touching account of an Edwardian middle-class childhood."

It was first broadcast on Sunday 29 August 1976, the day after the poet laureate's 70th birthday. In the film Betjeman re-visits the places he knew as a child, the houses he grew up in, his schools, his holiday haunts in Cornwall, and his college in Oxford. The film ends with his being sent down from Oxford and enrolling in desperation as a cricket master at a private prep school.

In an interview given to Radio Times Betjeman spoke about his verse autobiography and the making of the film: "I always had filthy reviews for it, and I didn't think it very good." He recalls that Joe Orton was arrested for defacing books in the public library – among them Summoned by Bells – on which he had stuck a pornographic picture. "I wrote it thinking it the best way to write about being young. I was thinking about Tennyson's (probably Betjeman's favourite poet) English Idylls and I had been reading Wordsworth's Prelude and I thought why not put down being a schoolmaster and this kind of thing into very plain blank verse. It's the shorter way of writing prose and I think easier. I think people's lives are interesting only up until they're 21. It's our first humiliations and struggles that are very interesting, so I thought I'd record them. I remember the sensual thrills one has as a child, the feeling of textures and the smell of things. I tried to put that down."

"Doing this thing has been the most devastating experience, I had no idea the kind of draining effect it has on one. I was an only child, considered very brilliant by my mother, and considered the future heir to the factory by my father. I mustn't let the men (workers) down, and I was thought to have let them down." Betjeman, from childhood, wanted to be a poet. "Namby-Pamby – that's what my father thought I was and I've always been sympathetic to Ambrose Phillips, the 18th century poet, who was the origin of the phrase namby-pamby. My father was always wanting to be a country gentleman, and trying to get me to do manly sports. I can't bear sport."
