= The Long Search =

1977 British documentary television series

- Genre: Documentary series
- Created by: BBC
- Directed by: Jonathan Stedall
- Presented by: Ronald Eyre
- Country of origin: United Kingdom
- Original language: English
- No. of seasons: 1
- No. of episodes: 13

Production
- Producer: Peter Montagnon
- Camera setup: John Else, et al.
- Running time: 52 minutes per episode

Original release
- Release: 19 September – 12 December 1977

The Long Search is a 1977 BBC documentary television series spanning 13 episodes. Presented by theatre director Ronald Eyre, the series surveys several major world religions, including Protestant, Orthodox, and Catholic Christianity. Other episodes survey Theravada and Zen Buddhism, Islam, Judaism, Hinduism, and the New Age movement. Location filming took place in India, England, Italy, Japan, Israel, Romania, Sri Lanka, Taiwan, the United States, Egypt, Indonesia, and South Africa.

Scholar of religion Ninian Smart acted as editorial consultant to the show, and also authored a companion book of the same name. The series was re-issued on DVD, and is currently distributed by Ambrose Video.

== Episode listing ==
1. Protestant Spirit USA (Indiana)
2. Hinduism: 330 Million gods
3. Buddhism: Footprint of the Buddha (Sri Lanka)
4. Catholicism: Rome, Leeds and the Desert
5. Islam: There is no God but God (Egypt)
6. Orthodox Christianity: The Romanian Solution
7. Judaism: The Chosen People
8. Religion In Indonesia: The Way of the Ancestors (Toraja)
9. Buddhism: The Land of the Disappearing Buddha (Japan)
10. African Religions: Zulu Zion (South Africa)
11. Taoism: A Question of Balance (Taiwan)
12. Alternative Lifestyles in California: West Meets East
13. Reflections on the Long Search
