= Ronald Eyre =

English theatre director, actor and writer (1929–1992)

Ronald Eyre

Ronald Eyre (13 April 1929 – 8 April 1992) was an English theatre director, actor and writer.

== Biography ==
Eyre was born at Mapplewell, near Barnsley, Yorkshire and he taught at Queen Elizabeth's Grammar School, Blackburn and Giggleswick School. He became a leading director for the cinema, opera, television and the theatre. He was nominated for Broadway's 1975 Tony Award as Best Director (Dramatic) for London Assurance. He presented the BBC television documentary series The Long Search (1977), a survey of various world religions, which won a Red Ribbon at the American Film Festival.

Eyre was the godfather of British actress Emma Thompson.

== Television ==
- As You Like It (1963) (TV) ... Director
- The Wednesday Play - A Crack in the Ice (1964) TV Episode ... Director and Dramatist
- Z-Cars - "Window Dressing" (1965) TV Episode ... Director and Writer
- Tom Grattan's War (1968) TV Episode ... Director
- Jackanory - "Christmas Stories: The Selfish Giant" (1968) TV Episode ... Storyteller
- Jackanory - "Johhny the Clockmaker" (1971) TV Episode ... Storyteller
- Jackanory - "Johnny's Bad Day/Diana and Her Rhinoceros" (1971) TV Episode ...Storyteller
- Jackanory - "Paul the Hero of the Fire" (1971) TV Episode ... Storyteller
- Jackanory - "Tim and Charlotte" (1971) TV Episode ... Storyteller
- Jackanory - eleven other TV Episodes
- Play of the Month - "Rasputin" (1971) TV Episode ... Writer
- The Long Search - (1977) (TV) Documentary Series... Writer and Host
- Falstaff (1982) (TV) ... Opera Director
- Wogan (1987) ... Interviewed
- Russell Harty 1934-1988 (1988) ... Interviewed
- Frontiers - Long Division (1990) ... Interviewed
- In My Defence - Neither Prison Nor Chains (1991) ... Interviewed
