= John Romer (Egyptologist) =

British egyptologist, historian and archaeologist

John Lewis Romer (born 30 September 1941, in Surrey, England) is a British Egyptologist, historian and archaeologist. He has created and appeared in many TV archaeology series, including Romer's Egypt, Ancient Lives, Testament, The Seven Wonders of the World, Byzantium: The Lost Empire and Great Excavations: The Story of Archaeology.

== Biography ==
Romer was educated at Ottershaw School, a state boarding school near Woking, Surrey, and the Royal College of Art in London, coming to archaeology through his epigraphic studies of painting and drawing. He went on to work as an artist in Persepolis and Cairo, drawing and studying ancient inscriptions.

Romer began his archaeological work in 1966, when he participated in the University of Chicago's Epigraphic Survey at the temples and tombs of the ancient Egyptian site of Thebes (modern-day Luxor). From 1977 to 1979 he organised an expedition to the Valley of the Kings which carried out the first excavation there since the discovery of Tutankhamen's tomb in 1922. In 1979 he headed the Brooklyn Museum's expedition to excavate the tomb of Ramesses XI.

In 1979 Romer and his wife (Elizabeth Romer, also an archaeologist and designer) set up the Theban Foundation, in Berkeley, California, a body dedicated to the conservation and documentation of the Royal Tombs of Thebes. One result of this was the creation of the Theban Mapping Project.

Romer's books (some co-written with his wife) include Valley of the Kings, Ancient Lives, Testament and The Seven Wonders of the World, many of which were televised. His most recent works, a trilogy entitled A History of Ancient Egypt were published in 2012, 2017, and 2023 respectively.

Romer lives in Tuscany, Italy.

== Works ==
=== Books ===
- Romer, John (1977), Damage in the Royal Tombs in the Valley of the Kings (unpublished)
- Romer, John (1981), Valley of the Kings; New York, NY: Henry Holt and Company 1981; ISBN 0-8050-0993-0.
- Romer, John (1984), Ancient Lives: Daily Life in Egypt of the Pharaohs (Reprinted, 1990, as Ancient Lives, The Story of the Pharaoh's Tombmakers); London: Phoenix Press, ISBN 1-84212-044-1.
- Romer, John (1988), Testament: the Bible and History; London: Michael O'Mara Books; ISBN 1-85479-005-6 New York: Henry Holt and Co., 1989; ISBN 0-8050-0939-6 (Based on the Channel Four television series Testament).
- Romer, John (1993), The Rape of Tutankhamun; London: Michael O'Mara Books, 1993; ISBN 1-85479-169-9.
- Romer, John (1993), Romer’s Egypt; London: Michael O'Mara Books, 1993; ISBN 0-7181-2136-8.
- Romer, John and Elizabeth Romer (2000), Great Excavations: John Romer’s History of Archaeology; London: Cassell; ISBN 0-304-35563-1.
- Romer, John (2007), The Great Pyramid: Ancient Egypt Revisited
- Romer, John (2012). A History of Ancient Egypt Volume 1: From the First Farmers to the Great Pyramid. Allen Lane. ISBN 978-1-84614-377-9
- Romer, John (2017). A History of Ancient Egypt Volume 2: From the Great Pyramid to the Fall of the Middle Kingdom. St. Martin's Press. ISBN 978-1-25003-013-9
- Romer, John (2023). A History of Ancient Egypt Volume 3: From the Shepherd Kings to the End of the Theban Monarchy. Penguin. ISBN 978-0-24145-499-2

=== Documentary films ===
- Romer's Egypt (1982), BBC TV; 3 episodes; 120 minutes
- Ancient Lives (1984), Central Television (ITV); 4 episodes; 205 minutes.
- Testament (1988), Antelope/Channel Four; 7 episodes; 363 minutes
- The Rape of Tutankhamun (1993); Channel 4/PBS/Voyager Films; 1 episode; 65 minutes
- The Seven Wonders of the World (1994); ABTV/Discovery Channel; 4 episodes; 202 minutes.
- Byzantium: The Lost Empire (1997); ABTV/Ibis Films/The Learning Channel; 4 episodes; 209 minutes.
- Great Excavations: John Romer's History of Archaeology (also released as Lost Worlds: The Story of Archaeology) (2000); ABTV/Channel Four/Southern Star; 6 episodes; 300 minutes.

== See also ==
- KV17 (Tomb of Seti I)
- Seven Wonders of the Ancient World
- Michael Wood
