= List of Camphill Communities =

List of Camphill Communities, communities for those in need of special care.

== Europe ==
=== Austria ===
- Camphill Liebenfels

=== Czech Republic ===
- Camphill České Kopisty

=== Estonia ===
- Pahkla Camphilli Küla

=== Finland ===
- Myllylähde yhteisö
- Sylvia-koti
- Tapolan kyläyhteisö
- Kaupunkikylä

=== France ===
- Foyer de Vie: Le Béal

=== Germany ===
- Camphill Dorfgemeinschaft Hausenhof
- Camphill Dorfgemeinschaft Hermannsberg
- Camphill Dorfgemeinschaft Lehenhof
- Camphill Dorfgemeinschaft Sellen e.V.
- Camphill Lebensgemeinschaft Königsmühle
- Camphill Schulgemeinschaft Bruckfelden
- Camphill Schulgemeinschaft Föhrenbühl
- Camphill Schulgemeinschaft and Hofgut Brachenreuthe
- Lebensgemeinschaft Alt-Schönow
- Markus Gemeinschaft e.V. and Gutshof Hauteroda

=== Ireland ===
- Ballybay
- Ballymoney
- The Bridge
- Callan
- Carrick-on-Suir and the Journeyman Programme
- Dingle
- Duffcarrig
- Dunshane
- Grangebeg
- Grangemockler
- Greenacres
- Jerpoint
- KCAT
- Kyle
- Thomastown (part of which is the Watergarden Cafe and Gardens)

=== Latvia ===
- Camphill Village Rozkalni

=== Lithuania ===
- AKVILA, Home for Social Therapy

=== Netherlands ===
- Christophorus
- Het Maartenhuis
- De Noorderhoeve

=== Norway ===
- Hogganvik Landsby
- Jøssåsen Landsby
- Rotvoll
- Solborg
- Vallersund Gård
- Vidaråsen Landsby

=== Poland ===
- Wspólnota w Wójtówce

=== Russia ===
- Camphill Svetlana (Founded in 1992)
- Camphill Chistye Klyuchi
- Tourmaline (Camphill affiliate)

=== Sweden ===
- Camphill Häggatorp
- Staffansgården

=== Switzerland ===
- Fondation Perceval
- Stiftung Humanus-Haus

=== UK ===
==== Scotland ====
The entire Camphill Movement takes its name from Camphill Estate in the Milltimber area of Aberdeen, Scotland, where the Camphill pioneers opened their first community for children with special needs in June 1940. Camphill Estate is now a campus of Camphill Rudolf Steiner Schools.

- Beannachar
- Blair Drummond
- Camphill Rudolf Steiner Schools
- Corbenic Camphill Community
- Loch Arthur
- Milltown
- Newton Dee Village
- Ochil Tower School

Simeon Care

- Tigh A'Chomainn
- Tiphereth

==== England ====
- Botton Village
- Camphill Communities East Anglia
- Camphill Devon
- Camphill Houses Stourbridge
- Camphill Milton Keynes
- Camphill St. Albans
- Croft Community
- Delrow Community
- Esk Valley Camphill
- Gannicox Community
- Grange Village
- Hatch Camphill Community
- Lantern Community
- Larchfield Community
- Oaklands Park
- Orchard Leigh Camphill Community
- Pennine Camphill Community
- The Sheiling Ringwood
- Sturts Farm
- Taurus Crafts
- The Mount Camphill Community

==== Wales ====
- Coleg Elidyr (including Victoria House)
- Glasallt Fawr

==== Northern Ireland ====
- Community Glencraig. A Village Community for adults and Children with boarding school in Seahill
- Community Holywood. A small urban Community for adults in Holywood
- Community Mourne Grange. A Village Community for adults near Kilkeel
- Community Clanabogan. A Village Community for adults near Omagh

== North America ==
=== Canada ===
==== British Columbia ====
- The Cascadia Society in North Vancouver, (founded 1990)
- Glenora Farm near Duncan (founded 1993)

==== Ontario ====
- Camphill Communities Ontario (founded 1986)
  - Camphill Nottawasaga near Angus (started 1987)
  - Camphill Sophia Creek in Barrie (started 1997)

==== Quebec ====
- Maison Emmanuel Centre Educatif near Val-Morin (founded 1982) -- "modeled on Camphill"

=== United States ===
==== California ====
- Camphill Communities California near Santa Cruz (founded 1998)

==== Hawaii ====
- Lokelani 'Ohana on Maui (founded 2006) -- "Camphill-inspired"

==== Louisiana ====
- Raphael Village In New Orleans (associated)

==== Minnesota ====
- Camphill Village Minnesota (founded 1980)

==== Missouri ====
- Oakwood Life-Sharing Services near West Plains

==== New Hampshire ====
- Plowshare Farm

==== New York ====
- Camphill Ghent
- Camphill Hudson
- Camphill Village U.S.A., Inc. (founded 1961)
- Triform (founded 1977)

==== Pennsylvania ====
- Camphill Special School (founded 1963)
- Camphill Village Kimberton Hills (founded 1972)
- Camphill Soltane (founded 1988) (former Camphill community)

==== Vermont ====
- Heartbeet Lifesharing in Hardwick (founded 2006)

==== Wisconsin ====
- Community Homestead in Osceola (founded 1995) -- "Camphill inspired"

== South America ==
=== Argentina ===
- Respirar Communidad -- "inspired" by the Camphill Movement

=== Colombia ===
- Camphill Agualinda

== Asia ==
=== India ===
- Camphill India

=== Vietnam ===
- Tinh Truc Gia

== Africa ==
=== Botswana ===
- Camphill Community Trust (including Rankoromane School, Legodimo Youth Training and Motse Wa Badiri Training)

=== Republic of South Africa ===
- Camphill Farm Community (Hermanus)
- Camphill School Hermanus
- Camphill Village West Coast
