= Camphill Movement =

Special education

The Camphill Movement is an initiative for social change based on the principles of anthroposophy. Camphill communities are residential communities and schools that provide support for the education, employment, and daily lives of adults and children with developmental disabilities, mental health problems, or other special needs.

There are over 100 Camphill communities in more than 20 countries across Europe, North America, Southern Africa and Asia.

== History ==
Pilgramshaim, a precursor to the Camphill Movement, was established in Silesia in 1929 by Karl König, an Austrian paediatrician. It had 150 children under its care in 1936, before König was forced out of Germany due to Nazi persecution, first to Austria and then, following the Anschluss, to Aberdeen.

The movement was founded in 1939 at Kirkton House near Aberdeen by a group that included König. It was his view that every human being possessed a healthy "inner personality" that was independent of their outer characteristics, including characteristics marking developmental or mental disability, and the role of the school was to recognize, nurture and educate this essential self. The communities' philosophy, anthroposophy, states that "a perfectly formed spirit and destiny belong to each human being." The underlying principles of König's Camphill school were derived from concepts of education and social life outlined decades earlier by anthroposophist Rudolf Steiner (1861–1925). Today there are over 100 communities worldwide, in more than 20 countries, mainly in Europe, but also in North America and Southern Africa.

The Camphill Movement takes its name from Camphill Estate in the Milltimber area of Aberdeen, Scotland, where the Camphill pioneers moved to with their first community for children with special needs in June 1940. Camphill Estate is now a campus of Camphill School Aberdeen. There are six Camphills in the Aberdeen area.

== Accolades ==
The Camphill School Aberdeen was noted in the HMI/Care Commission report for 2007 as meeting "very good" to "excellent" standards, The school also holds Autism Accreditation from the National Autistic Society.

The Botton village received the Deputy Prime Minister's Award for Sustainable Communities in 2005; the award cited the community's dedication to the ethos of sustainability and mutual respect, as well as their concrete achievements in these areas.

== See also ==
- List of Camphill Communities
