= Jonathan Stedall =

English television producer and documentary filmmaker (1938–2022)

- Born: Jonathan Hugh Pemberton Stedall; 20 January 1938; Prestwood, Buckinghamshire, England
- Died: 21 October 2022 (aged 84)
- Education: Cothill House; Harrow School
- Alma mater: London School of Film Technique
- Occupations: Television producer; documentary filmmaker
- Spouse(s): Jackie Barton (m. 1981; died 2014) Maureen Rowcliffe (m. 2021)
- Children: 2
- Website: jonathanstedall.co.uk

Jonathan Hugh Pemberton Stedall (20 January 1938 – 21 October 2022) was an English television producer and documentary filmmaker known for his collaborations with John Betjeman, Malcolm Muggeridge and Alan Bennett.

== Early life ==
Stedall was born on 20 January 1938 in Prestwood, Buckinghamshire, to Peter Stedall, a director of his family's tool-manufacturing company in the City of London, and his wife Mollie. Stedall had a sister and a brother. His parents divorced when he was eight. He was educated at the independent Cothill House and Harrow School.

On leaving Harrow, Stedall briefly worked in the family business, before studying at the London School of Film Technique.

== Career ==
=== Early career ===
Stedall worked as an assistant stage manager, then as a stage manager, with the repertory company at the Grand Theatre in Croydon. He then became an assistant film editor at Pinewood Studios.

=== Independent Television ===
For two years Stedall was a floor manager at the Independent Television companies Television Wales and the West (TWW) and Associated Television (ATV).

On rejoining TWW, the franchise holder for Independent Television in South Wales and the West of England, Stedall directed factual programmes. He directed Betjeman's West Country films broadcast by TWW between 1962 and 1963. The films featured towns including Sidmouth, Bath, Weston-super-Mare and Devizes. Stedall would remain friends with Betjeman until the end of his life in 1984. Stedall also worked with the writer Gwyn Thomas on portraits of Rhondda, Neath and other South Wales areas from 1962 to 1963.

=== BBC ===
In 1963, Stedall moved to the BBC as a producer and director. He started with two months on the current affairs programme Tonight. From 1964 to 1966, he produced Footprints, a travel series telling historical stories, followed by three films for the 1966 The World of a Child series.

In 1968, Stedall produced In Need of Special Care, a two-part documentary series about the Camphill Movement's work helping people with learning disabilities, which won the 1969 Society of Film and Television Arts Robert Flaherty Award and was nominated for the Society's United Nations Award. He switched to films about historical figures for Gandhi's India (1969), The Story of Carl Gustav Jung (1971) and Tolstoy: From Riches to Rags (1972).

In 1973, Stedall produced In Defence of the Stork, which examined the connections between embryology and the story of creation in the Book of Genesis, with Camphill's Thomas Weihs. That same year, Stedall directed Thank God It's Sunday, about how Londoners spend their Sundays. The programme was repeated on the BBC's Everyman in 1995, when it was introduced by Alan Bennett. He then worked on One Pair of Eyes (1974–1983), Summoned by Bells (1976) and The Long Search (1976–1978).

Stedall produced India – One Man's Truth (1978), an interview with the prime minister Morarji Desai, and From Our Own Delhi Correspondent (1982), a programme about the country's future.

In 1982, Stedall made Muggeridge: Ancient and Modern, in which Malcolm Muggeridge looked back on his life. In A Week With Svetlana (1982), Muggeridge interviewed Joseph Stalin's daughter, and, in Solzhenitsyn (1983), the Soviet author Alexander Solzhenitsyn.

In 1983, Stedall presented and produced Time with Betjeman, a 7-part series celebrating Betjeman's life and work. In 1985, he produced a 10-part Whicker's World series about Britons living in the US, Living With Uncle Sam, which earned BAFTA and Broadcasting Press Guild nominations. This was followed by a film with Laurens van der Post for his 80th birthday. Stedall directed four films inspired by William Shakespeare's Seven Ages of Man speech. Dinner at Noon, a portrait of Harrogate Hotel, followed, and in 1989, the 200th anniversary of the French Revolution, he made Revolution!!.

=== Independent work and writing ===
Stedall left the BBC in 1990 and became an independent documentary filmmaker in 1993, producing 21 films over 12 years. These included "Karachi to The Khyber Pass", an episode of Great Railway Journeys (1994), and Portrait or Bust (1994), about Leeds Art Gallery. He also produced The Abbey (1995), a day in the life of Westminster Abbey, then Mark Tully's Faces of India (1997) for Channel 4, marking the 50th anniversary of the country's independence.

Stedall directed the 100 Greatest Britons episode on Elizabeth I (2002), written and presented by Michael Portillo.

In 2009, Stedall wrote Where on Earth is Heaven?. In 2017 he produced a collection of poems written after the death of his wife in 2014, No Shore Too Far. In 2021, he published An Enchanted Place, in which Winnie-the-Pooh and his friends are de-anthropomorphised to fight against a housing development scheme in their beloved countryside.

== Personal life ==
In 1981, Stedall married Jackie Barton, a statistician and teacher who later became a mathematics historian. They had two children and lived in Painswick, Gloucestershire. Jackie died of cancer in 2014.

In 2021, Stedall married Maureen Rowcliffe. He died of cancer on 21 October 2022, at the age of 84.

== Filmography ==
Year	Title	Role	Notes
1962–1963	Betjeman TWW films	Director	12 episodes
1964–1966	Footprints	Producer	
1966	The World of a Child	Producer	3 episodes
1968	In Need of Special Care	Writer / producer	2 episodes
1973	In Defence of the Stork	Producer	
1973	Thank God It's Sunday	Director	1 episode
1974–1984	One Pair of Eyes	Producer / director	9 episodes
1976	Summoned by Bells	Producer	Television film
1977	The Long Search	Director	13 episodes
1978	India – One Man's Truth	Producer	1 episode
1982	Muggeridge: Ancient and Modern	Producer	8 episodes
1982	From Our Own Delhi Correspondent	Producer	1 episode
1983	Time with Betjeman	Presenter / producer	7 episodes
1985	Whicker's World: Living with Uncle Sam	Producer	10 episodes
1988	Dinner at Noon		Television film
1989	Revolution!!	Director	Television film
1994	The Lost Betjemans	Director	Television film
1994	Betjeman Revisited	Director	Television film
1994	Great Railway Journeys	Producer	1 episode
1994	Portrait or Bust	Director	Television film
1995	Thank God It's Sunday	Director	1 episode
1995	The Abbey	Director	3 episodes
1997	Mark Tully's Faces of India	Producer	
2002	100 Greatest Britons	Director	1 episode

== Sources ==
- "About". Jonathan Stedall.
- "Films". Jonathan Stedall.
- Hallam, Chris (4 July 2021). "Poet laureate's ode to 'seductive' town by the sea". Sidmouth Herald.
- Hayward, Anthony (27 October 2022). "Jonathan Stedall obituary". The Guardian.
- "Jonathan Stedall". Hawthorn Press.
- Neumann, Peter (24 October 2014). "Jacqueline Stedall obituary". The Guardian.
- "Obituaries". myPension. Archived from the original on April 18, 2022.
- Stedall, Jonathan (2009). Where on Earth is Heaven?. Hawthorn Press. ISBN 978-1-903458-90-7.
- "Time with Betjeman". BBC Programme Index. 27 March 1983. Archived from the original on October 20, 2014.
