= St Francis of Assisi Church, Shefford =

Coordinates: 52.0377°N 0.3356°W

St Francis of Assisi Church
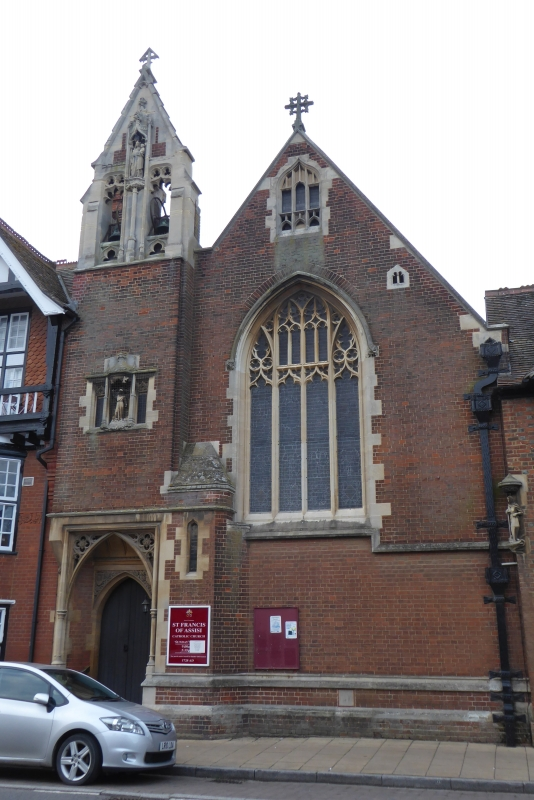
- St Francis of Assisi Church
- OS grid reference: TL 14260 39011
- Location: Shefford, Bedfordshire
- Country: England
- Denomination: Roman Catholic
- Website: SaintFrancis.uk

History
- Former name: St George's Chapel
- Status: Active
- Founded: 1791
- Founder: Pauline Duvernay
- Dedication: Francis of Assisi

Architecture
- Functional status: Parish church
- Heritage designation: Grade II* listed
- Designated: 10 January 1985
- Architect: Samuel Joseph Nicholl
- Style: Gothic Revival
- Groundbreaking: 4 October 1882
- Completed: 8 July 1884

Administration
- Province: Westminster
- Diocese: Northampton
- Parish: Shefford

St Francis of Assisi Church is a Catholic parish church in Shefford, Bedfordshire. The church was built from 1882 to 1884 and designed by Samuel Joseph Nicholl in the Gothic Revival style, and includes the remains of a chapel built in 1791. It is located on the High Street, in the centre of Shefford. It is a Grade II* listed building.

== History ==
=== Foundation ===
After the English Reformation, during the time of recusancy, until the Roman Catholic Relief Act 1829, some Catholics in Shefford were recorded as papists by the authorities. Great Shefford Manor (also known as West Shefford Manor) was owned by the recusant George Browne from 1614 to 1664. In the 1700s, a priest was resident in nearby Weston Underwood and he would travel to Shefford to serve the Catholic community there. In 1742, the Apostolic Vicar of the London District, Bishop Richard Challoner visited Shefford and wrote that there were twenty Catholics in the town. With the passing of the Roman Catholic Relief Act 1791, a chapel, St George's, was built behind a house on the Shefford High Street. By 1830, the number of Catholics recorded in Shefford had grown to 200. Until 1874, St George' Chapel was the only Catholic place of worship in Bedfordshire. In 1869, a Catholic orphanage, St Francis' Boys Home, was started in the building next door.

=== Construction ===
With the increasing size of the congregation, a larger church was needed. The priest, a Canon Collis, made efforts to get a new one built. The new church, St Francis of Assisi Church, built between the old chapel and High Street, was mainly paid for by Pauline Duvernay. On 4 October 1882, the foundation stone of the church was laid. The architect was Samuel Joseph Nicholl (1826 to 1905) from Kentish town, London. He was married to Agnes Rose Bouvier Nicholl. He mainly worked with T. J. Willson. During his career, Alexander Scoles was his student and George Campbell Sherrin and Henry Bloomfield Bare were his assistants. Other churches he designed included: St Alban and St Stephen's Church, St Albans, Our Lady of the Sacred Heart Church, Wellingborough, St Catherine's Church, West Drayton and St Charles Borromeo Church, Westminster. On 8 July 1884, the church was opened. Next door to it, and built at the same time, was a seminary, St Thomas Aquinas, which closed in 1908. A presbytery was also constructed next to the church. The old chapel still remains, it is a sacristy, and once was a school room for the orphanage, which closed in 1975.

== Parish ==
The church has its own parish. There are no longer any schools in the parish. The church has Sunday Mass at 9:00 am and 5:15 pm.

== See also ==
- Lynford Hall
- Our Lady and the English Martyrs Church
- Diocese of Northampton
