= Agnes Rose Bouvier Nicholl =

English artist

- Born: November 1842; London, England
- Died: 1892 (aged 49–50)
- Known for: Painting
- Style: Watercolour

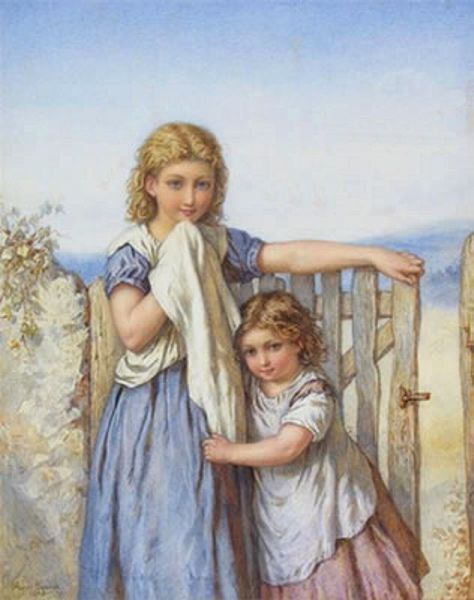
Two girls by a Gate

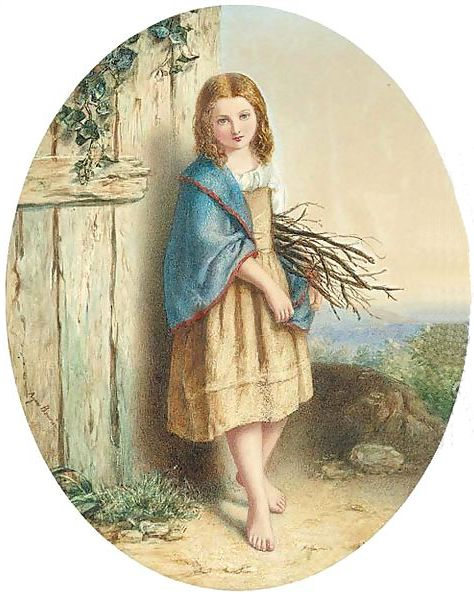
The Young Faggot Gatherer

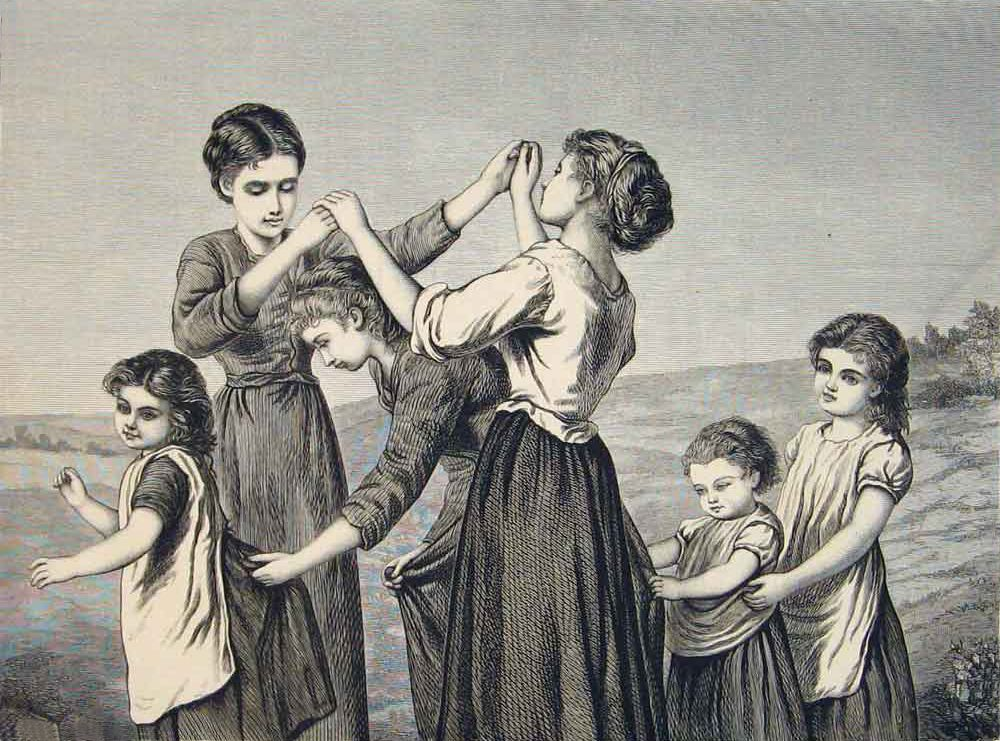
Oranges And Lemons 1874

Agnes Rose Bouvier Nicholl (1842 - 1892) was an English artist noted especially for her watercolours of rustic scenes with children.

Agnes Rose Bouvier was born in London in November 1842. Her father, Jules Bouvier, also a painter, was born in Paris but came to live in London in 1818 and married Agnes Chalmers. Bouvier first exhibited a painting called Sticks for Granny in 1860 in Birmingham. She began exhibiting at the Royal Society of British Artists in 1866. In 1874, she married Samuel Joseph Nicholl, an architect who designed St Charles Borromeo Church, Westminster, and Our Lady of the Sacred Heart Church, Wellingborough. She continued showing at the Royal Academy, the Royal Glasgow Institute of the Fine Arts, and the Society of Women Artists until around 1893. Various works have been sold at Bonhams, including small portraits of young ladies, A little offering, and a Children's tea party.

She appears in the book English Female Artists, which lists the prominent English women painters up to 1876, the year of its publication.

Bouvier's brother Augustus Jules Bouvier, was also a painter and draughtsman.
