= St Catherine's Church, West Drayton =

Coordinates: 51.5043°N 0.4763°W

St Catherine's Church
- St Catherine of Alexandria Church
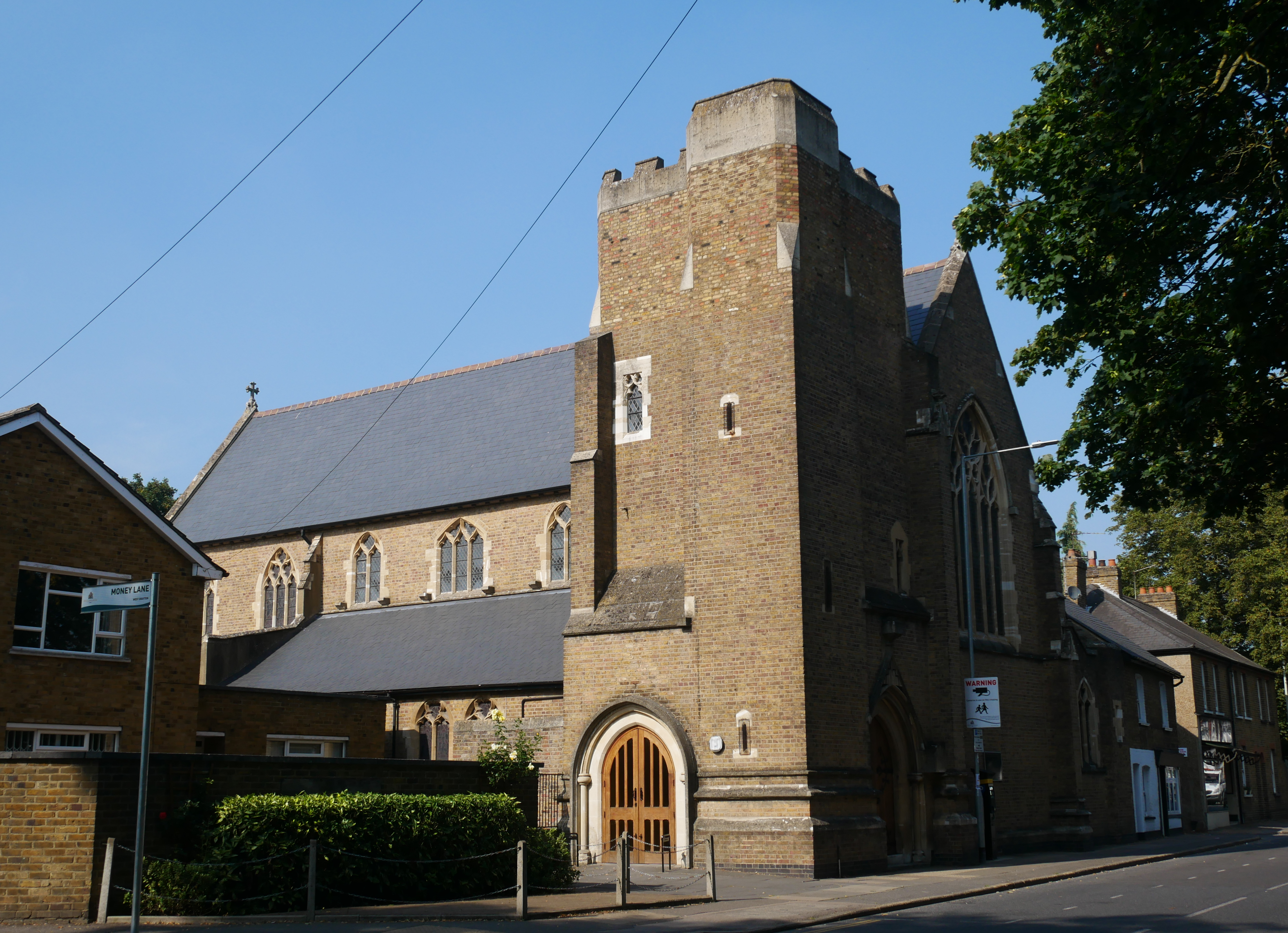
- St Catherine's Church
- Location: West Drayton
- Country: England
- Denomination: Catholic
- Website: Official website

History
- Status: Parish church
- Dedication: Catherine of Alexandria
- Consecrated: 29 September 1893

Architecture
- Functional status: Active
- Heritage designation: Grade II listed
- Designated: 12 May 2016
- Architect(s): Thomas John Willson; Samuel Joseph Nicholl
- Style: Gothic Revival
- Groundbreaking: 26 October 1868
- Completed: 29 September 1869

Administration
- Province: Westminster
- Archdiocese: Westminster
- Deanery: Hillingdon
- Parish: West Drayton and Yiewsley

St Catherine's Church or St Catherine of Alexandria Church is a Catholic parish church in West Drayton, Borough of Hillingdon, London. It was built from 1868 to 1869 and designed by Thomas John Willson and Samuel Joseph Nicholl. It is architecturally in the Gothic Revival style. It is situated on The Green near the town centre. On 12 May 2016, it was designated a Grade II listed building. It is the only Catholic Church that is a listed building by Historic England in the Borough of Hillingdon.

== History ==
=== Foundation ===
After the English Reformation, during the time of recusancy, until the Roman Catholic Relief Act 1829, some Catholics in West Drayton, particularly the Paget family, descendants of William Paget, 1st Baron Paget, were recorded as papists by the authorities. Anne Paget (died 1587), William's wife, was suspected of hiding Anthony Tyrrell after he escaped from prison. In 1676 and 1706, no one wrote that they were Catholic in those years' censuses. For the rest of the 18th century, there were no recorded instances of Catholic public worship.

The number of Catholics in West Drayton began to increase with the arrival of Irish migrants to work in the market-gardens situated around the village. In 1867, West Drayton had its own Catholic parish and a resident priest, Fr Michael Wren. The priest lived at White Cottage on Money Lane. In 1868, stables and an old coachhouse were turned into a temporary chapel. It could fit 400 people, and there was a space there for 80 schoolchildren too. The Catholic congregation used these temporary premises while the current church was being built.

=== Construction ===
On 26 October 1868 the foundation stone of the church was laid by the Archbishop of Westminster, Henry Manning. The architects were Thomas John Willson and Samuel Joseph Nicholl. The two of them had worked on other notable Catholic churches such as St Charles Borromeo Church, Westminster and St Alban and St Stephen's Church, St Albans. The church is in the Gothic Revival style and it opened on 29 September (Michaelmas) 1869 with Henry Manning preaching its first sermon.

In 1886, a new high altar was installed in the church. In 1985, the organ was restored, the altar rails removed and the high altar was brought forward. That year, efforts were made to build a spire on top of the tower according to the original plan of the church. However, as not enough money was raised, a small concrete block was added to the top of the tower.

== Parish ==
St Catherine's Catholic Primary School is to the west of the church. The church has four Sunday Masses at 7:00 pm on Saturday and at 9:00 am, 11:00 am and 6:00 pm on Sunday.

== See also ==
- Diocese of Westminster
