= St Francis' Boys' Home =

Children's home in Bedfordshire, England

Coordinates: 52.038°N 0.335°W

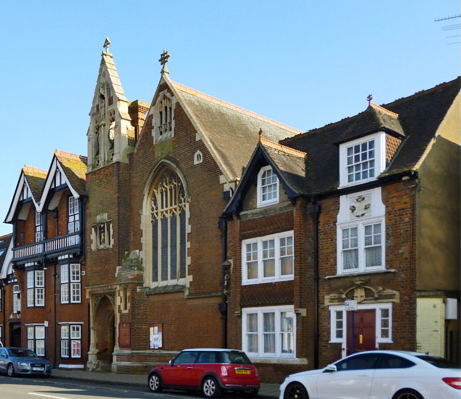
the building left of the church

St Francis' Boys' Home in Shefford, Bedfordshire was the longest serving children's home in England.

== History ==
Founded in 1868 and situated next to St Francis of Assisi Church, it played a vital role in providing care provision for children who could not live at home. The origins of this demand was facilitated by amendments in the Poor Laws, which allowed faith homes to be opened and for financial support to be provided from the state and local government/local parish. Soon after these changes in the Poor Laws, the Roman Catholic Church opened a large number of institutions to provide care for the children of Catholic families. The home closed in 1974.

The home was able to take up to 65 children between the ages of 5 and 16 years and although it was commonly referred to as an orphanage, actually in its later history was a home for children of the poor. Many of the children housed there came from broken homes and this is referred to in the Home Office inspection reports.

In its latter years the home was run by the Northampton Diocese of the Roman Catholic Church under a registered charity called the Northampton Diocese Child Protection and Welfare Society. In 1977 this charity was renamed the St Francis' Children's Society, registered as a charity with number 211670 with the Charity Commission of England and Wales, which still operates adoption and fostering services and is based in Milton Keynes in Buckinghamshire. The Society closed its children's homes in 1970. It became independent of the Catholic Church when the Church stopped offering adoption services in the UK in 2008. It is a company limited by guarantee with registration number 00392550. On 6 August 1979 it became a Grade II listed building.

== Abuse of children ==
Allegations of sexual abuse of children were investigated by police from 2002, following a two-year investigation by a local newspaper. Two former residents were later paid substantial out-of-court settlements in compensation for abuse by multiple priests; abuse by father John Ryan, who had since died, was cited specifically. Northampton Diocese, when asked to comment, did not respond.

In May 2013 Bedfordshire Police launched an investigation into allegations of physical and sexual abuse at the home in the 1950s and 1960s. A trial of the facts was held in the Old Bailey in September 2016 on 52 charges against carer James McCann, deemed unfit to stand trial, of violent and sexual assaults on 26 boys aged between eight and twelve in the 1960s and 1970s.
