= St Alban and St Stephen's Church, St Albans =

Ss Alban and Stephen Church
- St Alban and St Stephen's Church
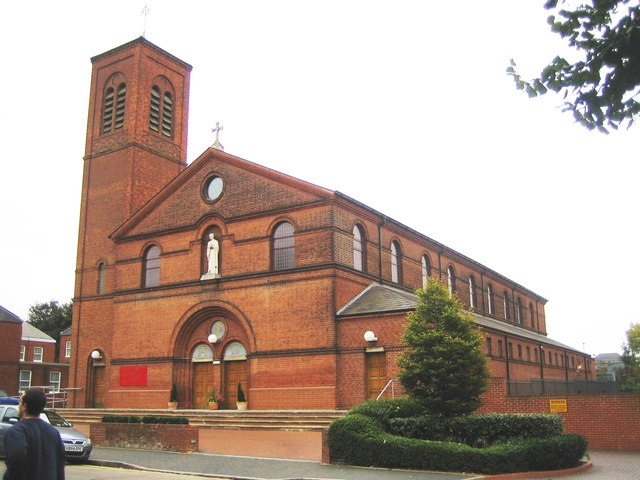
- Ss Alban and Stephen Church
- 51.75129°N 0.32857°W
- OS grid reference: TL 14494 07485
- Location: St Albans
- Country: England
- Denomination: Roman Catholic
- Website: AlbanStephen.org

History
- Status: Parish church
- Founded: 22 June 1877
- Dedication: Saint Alban; Saint Stephen
- Consecrated: 4 May 1977
- Events: Extended 1965-7

Architecture
- Functional status: Active
- Architect: John Kelly
- Style: Italianate
- Groundbreaking: 22 July 1903
- Completed: 1 January 1905

Administration
- Province: Westminster
- Archdiocese: Westminster
- Deanery: St Albans
- Parish: Ss Alban & Stephen

St Alban and St Stephen's Church or Ss Alban and Stephen Church is a Roman Catholic parish church in St Albans, Hertfordshire, England. Although it was built from 1903 to 1905, it was the third attempt to build a permanent local Catholic church in St Albans. It was designed by John Kelly of Kelly & Birchall in the Italian style. It is located on Beaconsfield Road next to the St Albans City railway station in the city centre.

== History ==
=== Old Church ===
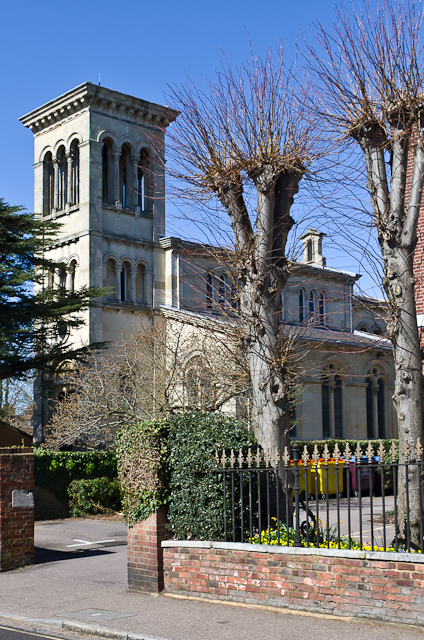
The Old Church, originally intended to be Ss Alban and Stephen Church

In 1840, a mission was started by Fr William Crook, who travelled to the city from St Edmund's College, Ware. He hired a room at the White Hart Inn on Holywell Hill. In 1847, plans were made to build a church in the city by Alexander Raphael. He commissioned Charles Parker to design the church, who also designed St Raphael's Church, Surbiton and was a pupil of Jeffry Wyatville. Raphael bought the site next to Verulam House for the church, but Raphael died in 1850 and did not complete payment for the church. The site was then sold to Isabelle Worley of Sopwell House. She paid for the church to be completed according to the original plan, however, as an Anglican church. In 1859, the church was consecrated. The church later became Methodist, before later becoming private offices. It is a Grade II listed building.

=== London Road church ===
When the Old Church became Anglican, the original mission ended. In the 1860s, a mission was restarted, led by a former Anglican, Fr George Bampfield, who came from Barnet to St Albans. He celebrated Mass in a cottage on London Road. On 22 June 1877, the foundation stone of a new church was laid by Cardinal Henry Manning, the Archbishop of Westminster. It was funded by a Major James Gape and designed by the architects T. J. Willson and Samuel Joseph Nicholl. Nicholl also designed Our Lady of the Sacred Heart Church, Wellingborough and St Charles Borromeo Church, Westminster. On 22 June 1878, the church was opened by Cardinal Manning. It had a capacity of 80 people and cost a total of £1,100.

=== Current church ===
Since 1899, the Catholic community in St Albans was served by the Missionaries of the Sacred Heart. By 1900, the church was no longer large enough to accommodate the increasing congregation and there was no space around the church to build an extension. The priest at the time was Fr Michael Tierney. He received permission from Cardinal Herbert Vaughan, the Archbishop of Westminster to build the current church and sell the church on London Road. On 22 July 1903, Bishop Algernon Stanley, auxiliary bishop of Westminster laid the foundation stone. The architect was John Kelly. The construction was done by local builders, Christopher Miskin & Sons. On 1 January 1905, the church was opened by Francis Bourne, Archbishop of Westminster. From 1965 to 1967, the church was enlarged. The architectural firm of Broadbent, Hastings, Reid & Todd designed the extensions and the total cost came to £70,000. The nave was extended, the old sanctuary was demolished and replaced with a larger one with side chapels. Side aisles, a bell tower, a choir gallery and a larger narthex were added. There was an old school to the back of the church that was demolished and replaced with a parish hall and sacristy. In 1974, a new presbytery was built. With the extensions, the church's capacity went from 400 people to 600 people. On 4 May 1977, the church was consecrated.

== Parish ==
In June 2019, the Missionaries of the Sacred Heart handed the parish back to the Diocese of Westminster, who continue to serve the church. The church has four Sunday Masses at 6:00pm on Saturday and at 9:30am, 11:30am and 6:00pm on Sunday. One Sunday Mass is celebrated at nearby St John Fisher School in Marshalswick at 9:00am.

== Interior ==
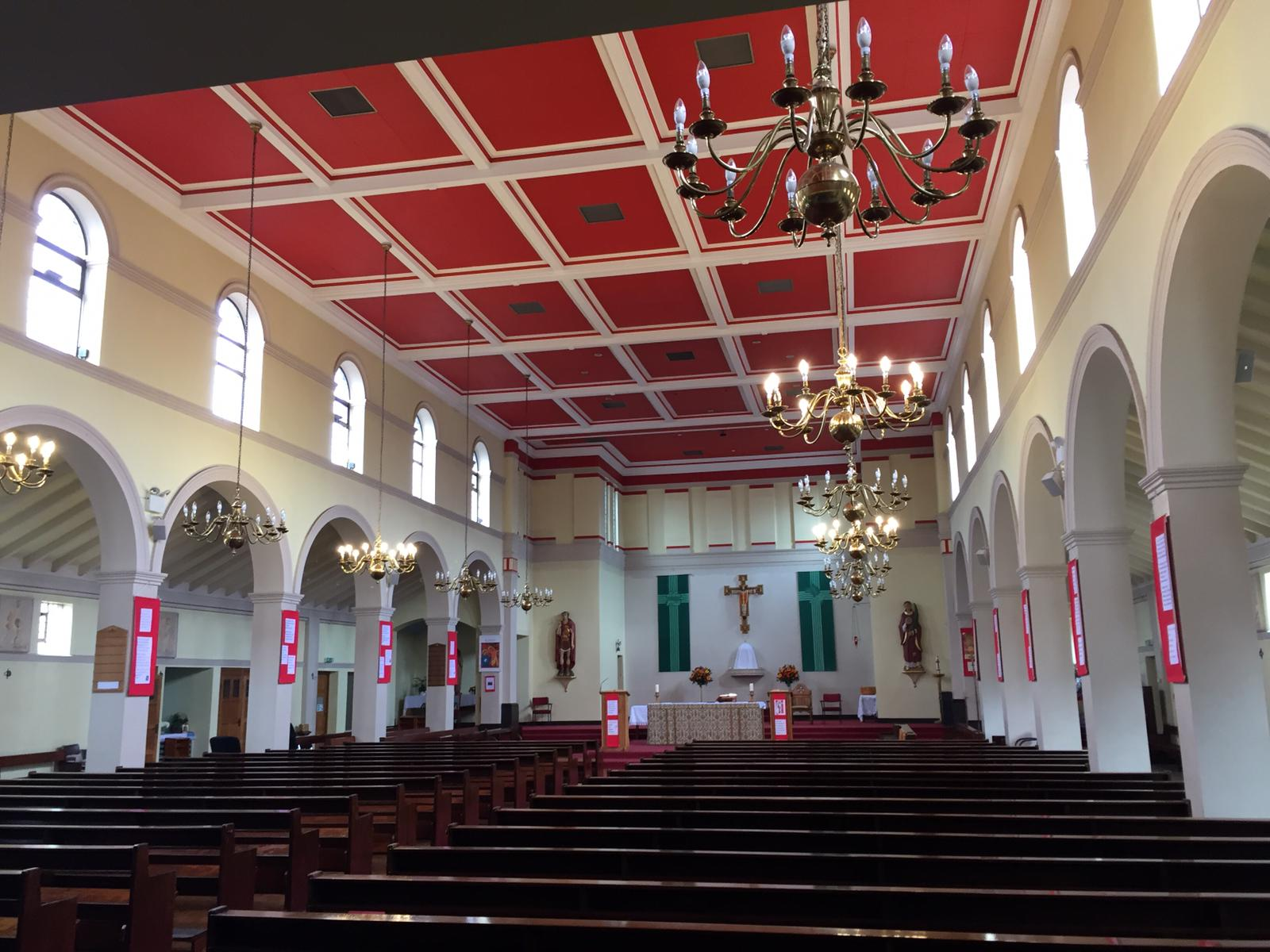
Interior

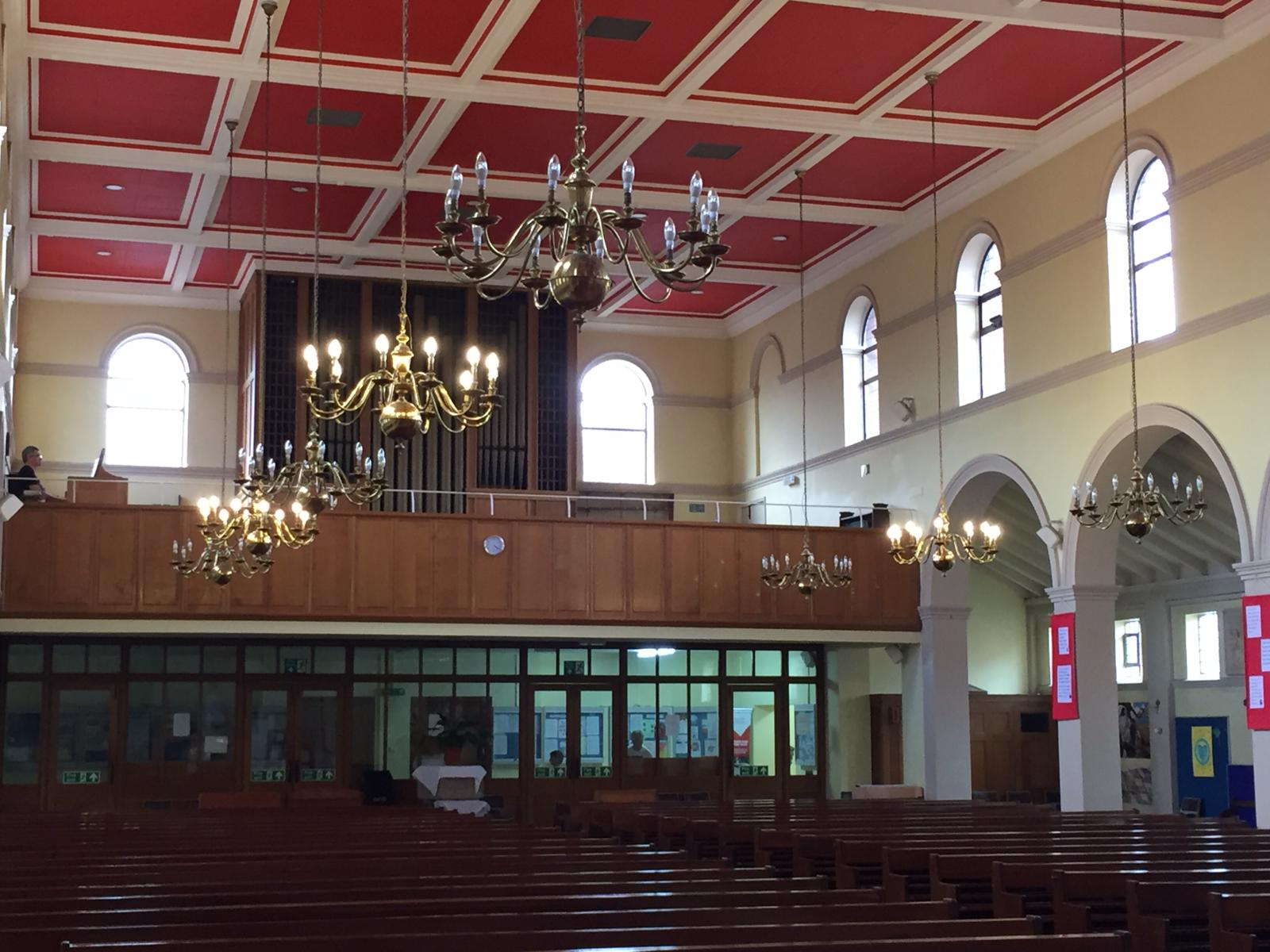
Organ

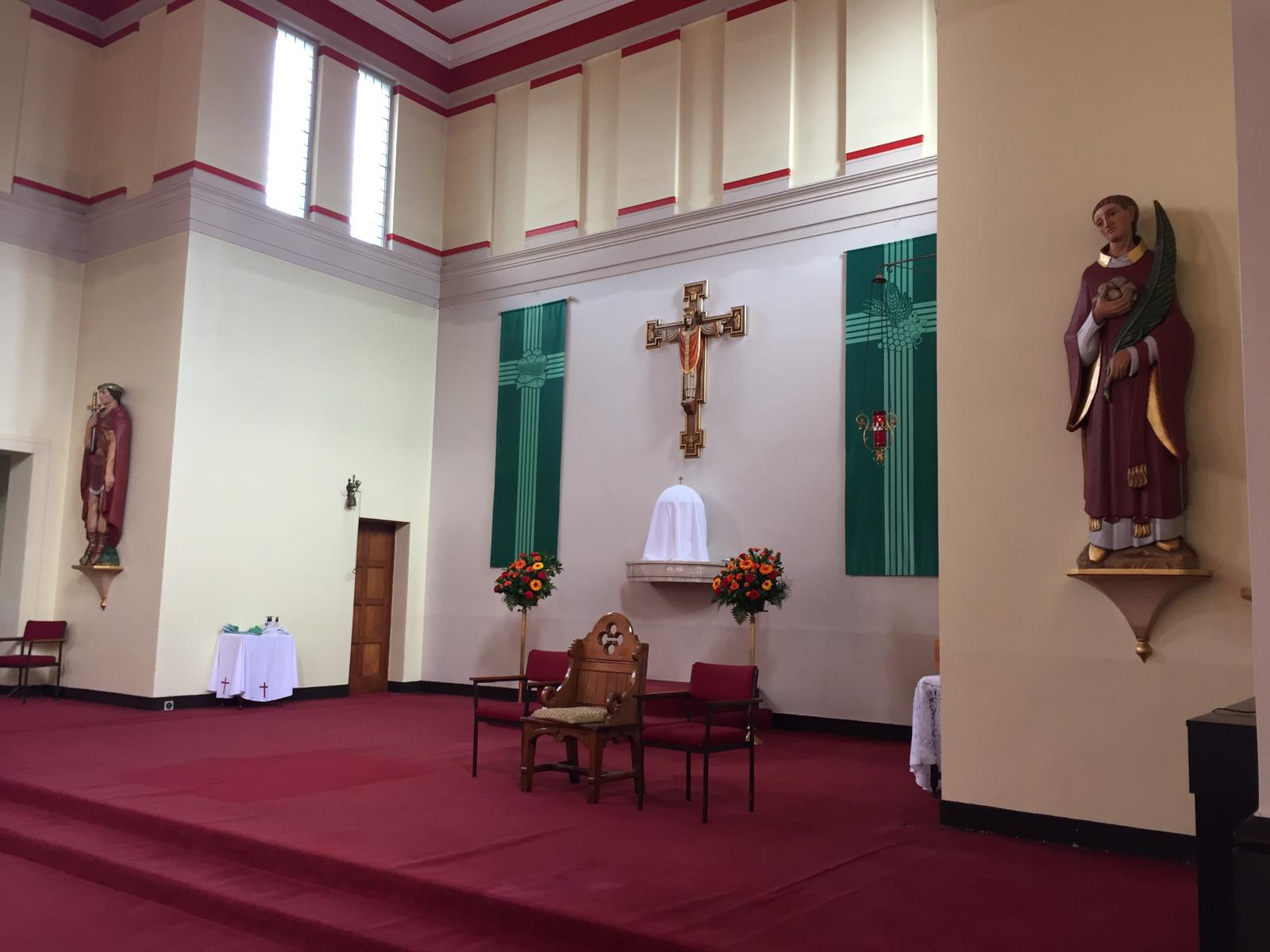
Sanctuary
