= Samuel Joseph Nicholl =

- Born: 29 March 1826; London
- Died: 21 March 1905 (aged 78); London
- Education: Student of Joseph John Scoles, Royal Institute of British Architects
- Spouse: Agnes Rose Bouvier Nicholl

Samuel Joseph Nicholl, also known as S. J. Nicholl (1826–1905), was an English ecclesiastical architect and author. He mainly worked with Thomas John Willson, mentored many other architects and designed many Catholic churches in England.

== Life ==
He was born in London on 29 March 1826. From 1840 to 1847 he was a student of Joseph John Scoles. He would later write Scoles' entry in the Dictionary of National Biography. From 1843 he was registered as a student of the Royal Institute of British Architects. On 29 November 1847, he qualified as an Associate of the Royal Institute of British Architects. From 1853 he was an assistant to Philip Hardwick. From 1857 to 1859, he worked with George J. Wigley. In 1859, he submitted a design for Ss Peter and Paul Church in Cork, Ireland with George J. Wigley. However, it was not chosen. From 1859 to 1869, he worked with Thomas John Willson, also known as T. J. Willson. Their architectural firm was based in Kentish Town, London. During that partnership they designed many churches for the Catholic Church in England and Wales and taught other architects such as Henry Bloomfield Bare and Alexander Scoles. From 1869, he worked on his own. From 1874 to 1877, Leonard Stokes did his training with Nicholl. In 1874, he married Agnes Rose Bouvier Nicholl. On 21 March 1905, he died in Kentish Town, London.

== Works ==
Churches he designed with Thomas John Willson include: St Charles Borromeo Church, Westminster in 1862, the south aisle of St John the Baptist Church, Hackney in 1862 (now demolished); St Catherine's Church, West Drayton in 1868, St Anne's Church in Accrington in 1869 (demolished in 2003); and St Alban and St Stephen's Church, St Albans in 1878 (now demolished). Together with Willson, they also designed at least two memorials: one to Charles Napier in Victoria Park, Portsmouth, and another to HMS Chesapeake in Southsea, Portsmouth. While working alone he continued to design other buildings, these include: 42 Maiden Lane, Westminster in 1873; St Helen's Church, Oldcotes in 1877; St Francis of Assisi Church, Shefford in 1882; and Our Lady of the Sacred Heart Church, Wellingborough in 1884. He was also responsible for additions, extensions and renovations made to pre-existing churches, such as the apse of St Walburge's Church, Preston in 1872; the bishop's house next to Northampton Cathedral in 1877; extensions to St George's Church, Worcester from 1878 to 1880; the lady chapel of St Michael and St John Church, Clitheroe in 1884; the exterior of St Wilfrid's Church, Preston in 1890; parts of the interior of St Francis Xavier Church, Liverpool; and repairs to the Church of Our Lady in St John's Wood in 1905.

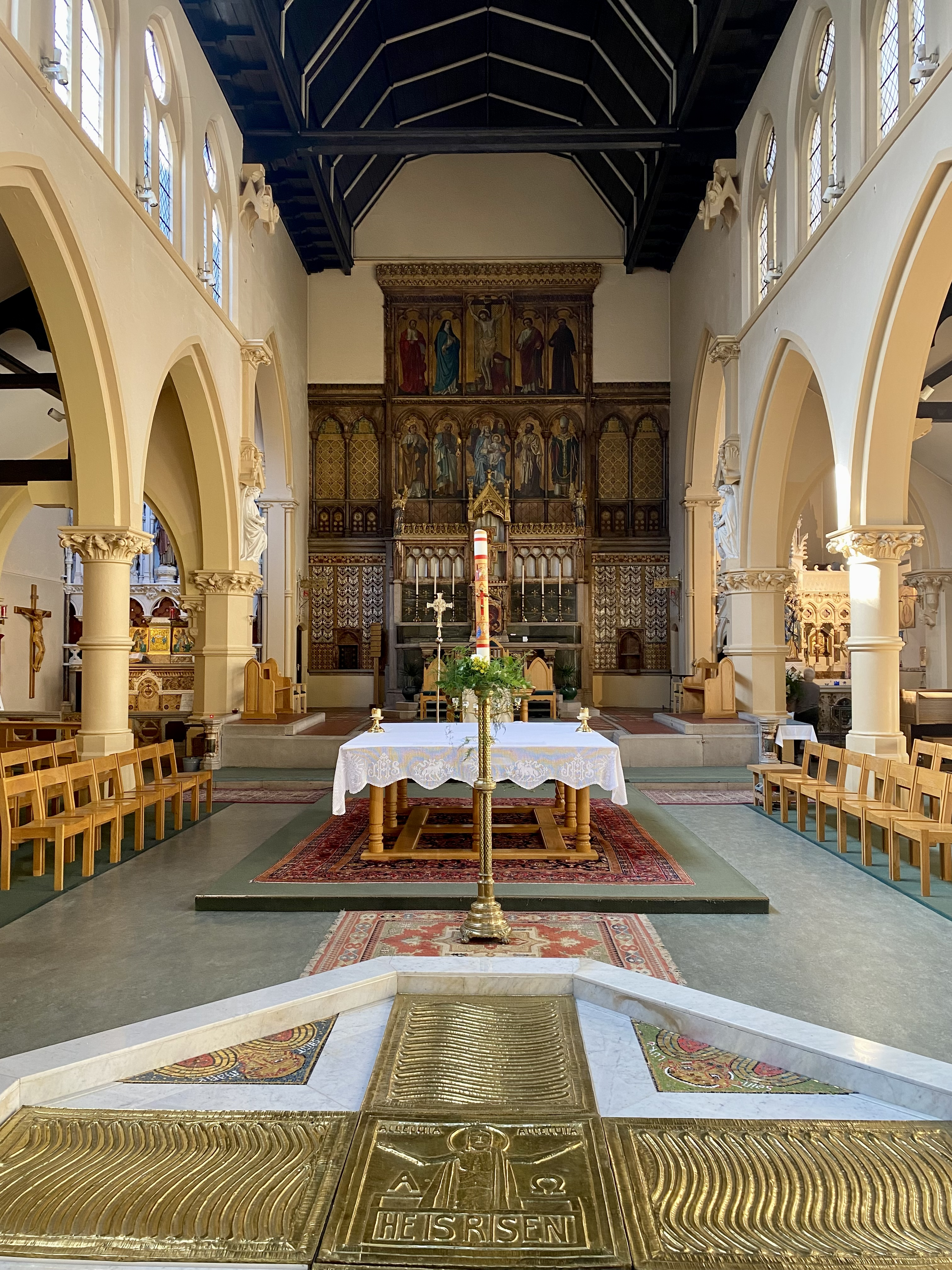
St Charles Borromeo Church, Westminster

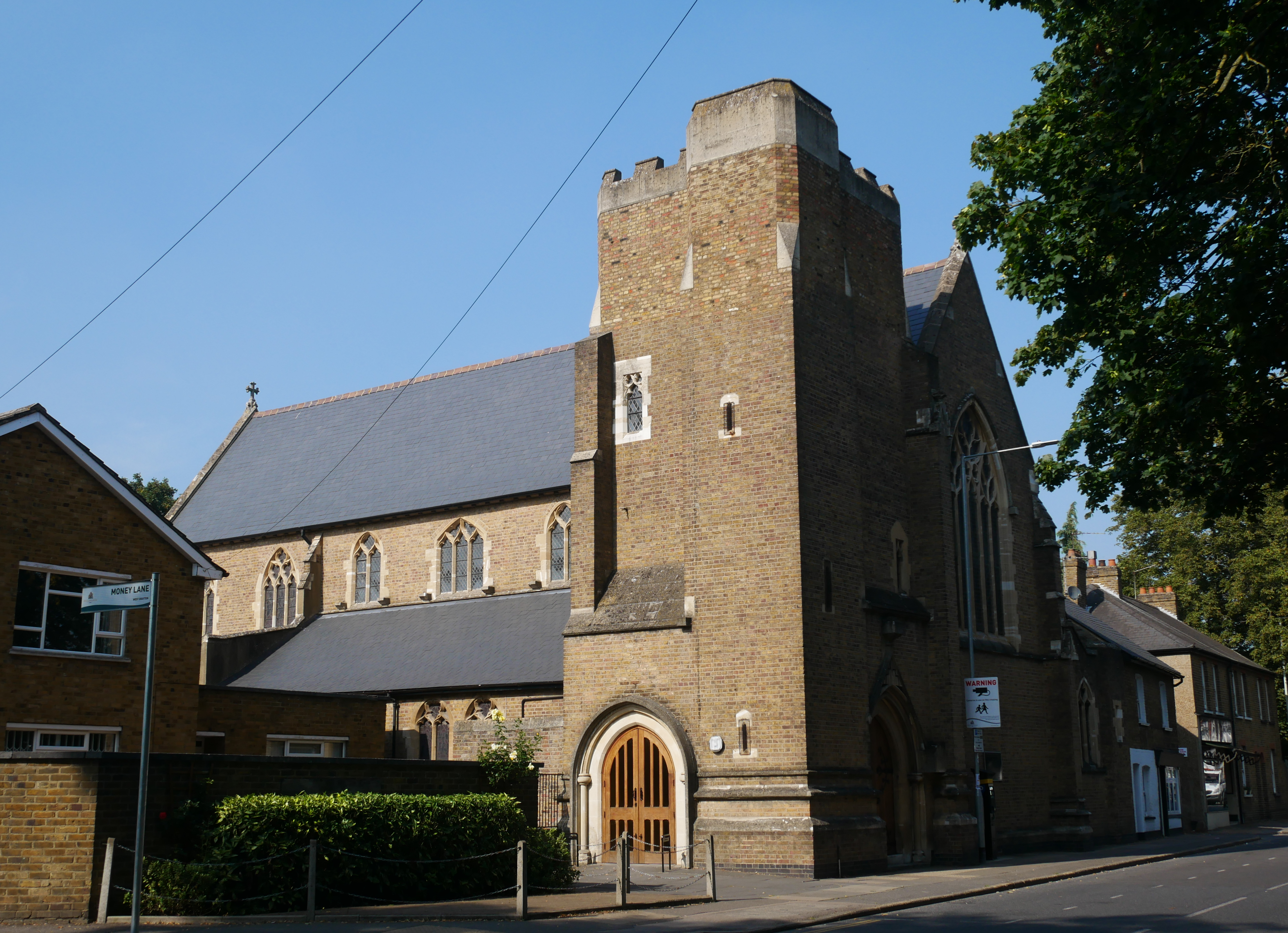
St Catherine's Church, West Drayton

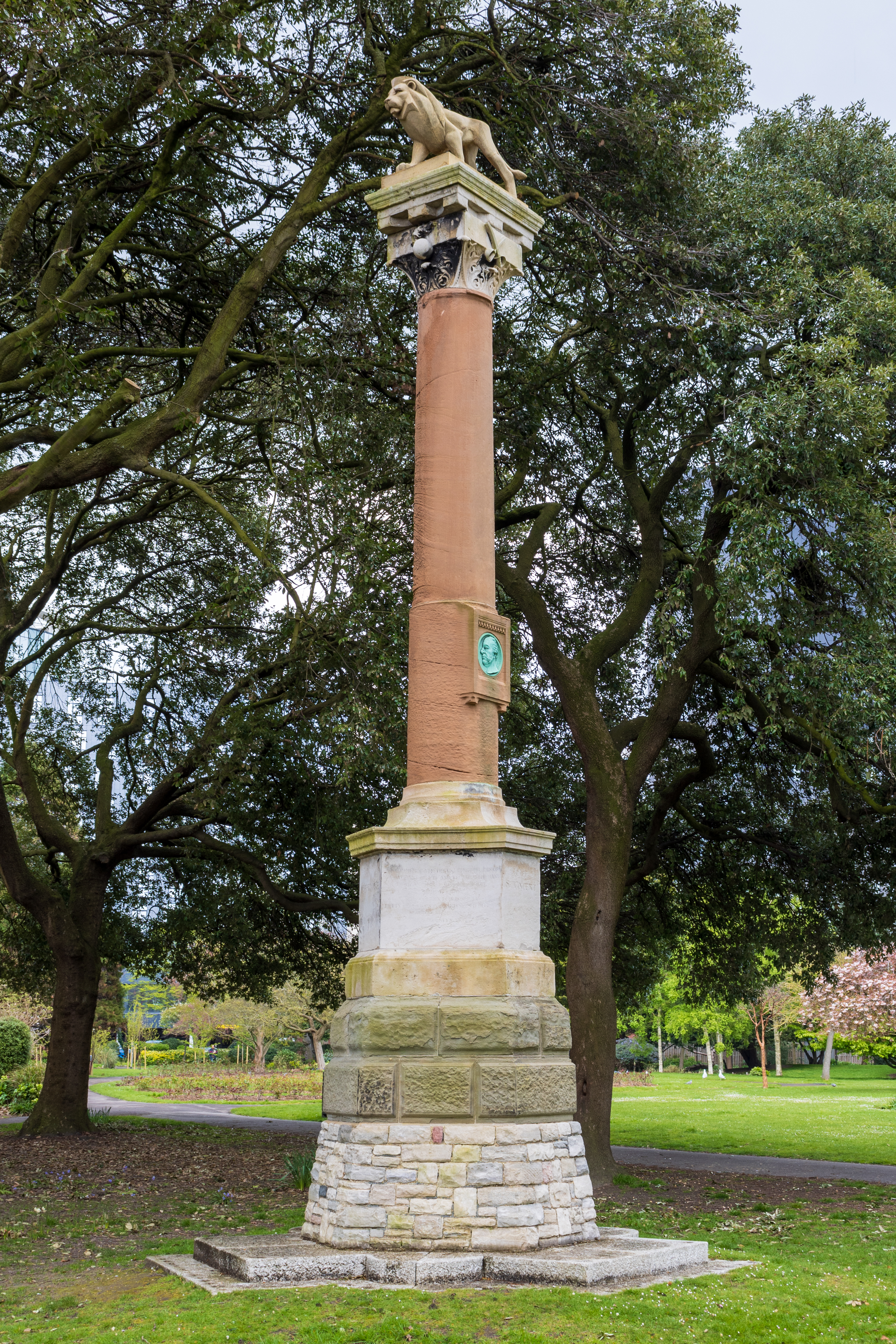
Charles Napier's Memorial

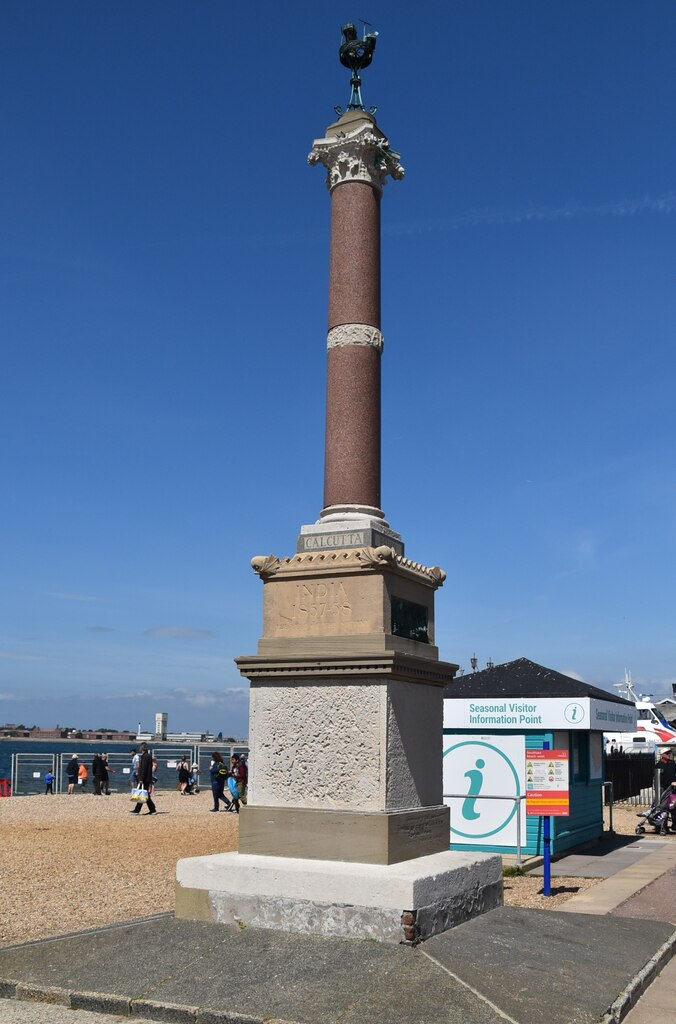
Memorial to HMS Chesapeake

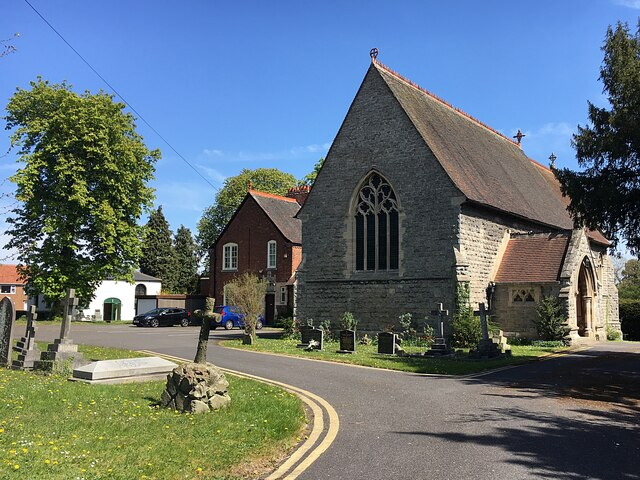
St Helen's Church, Oldcotes

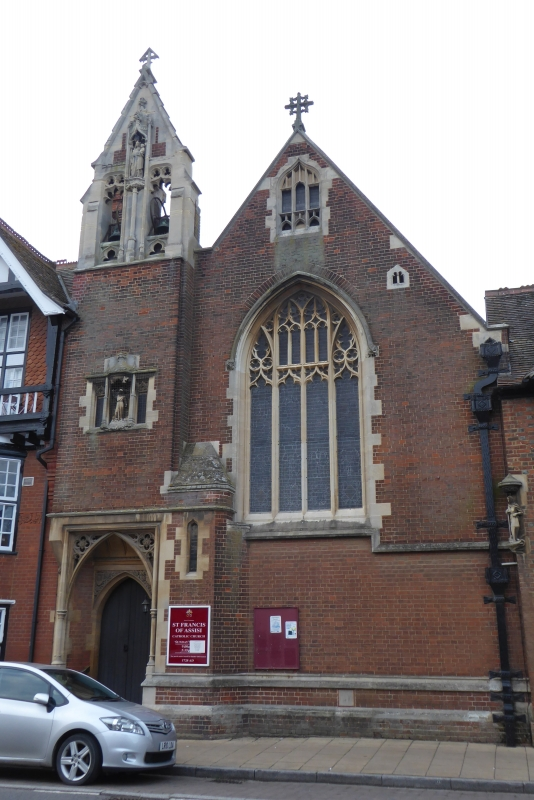
St Francis of Assisi Church, Shefford

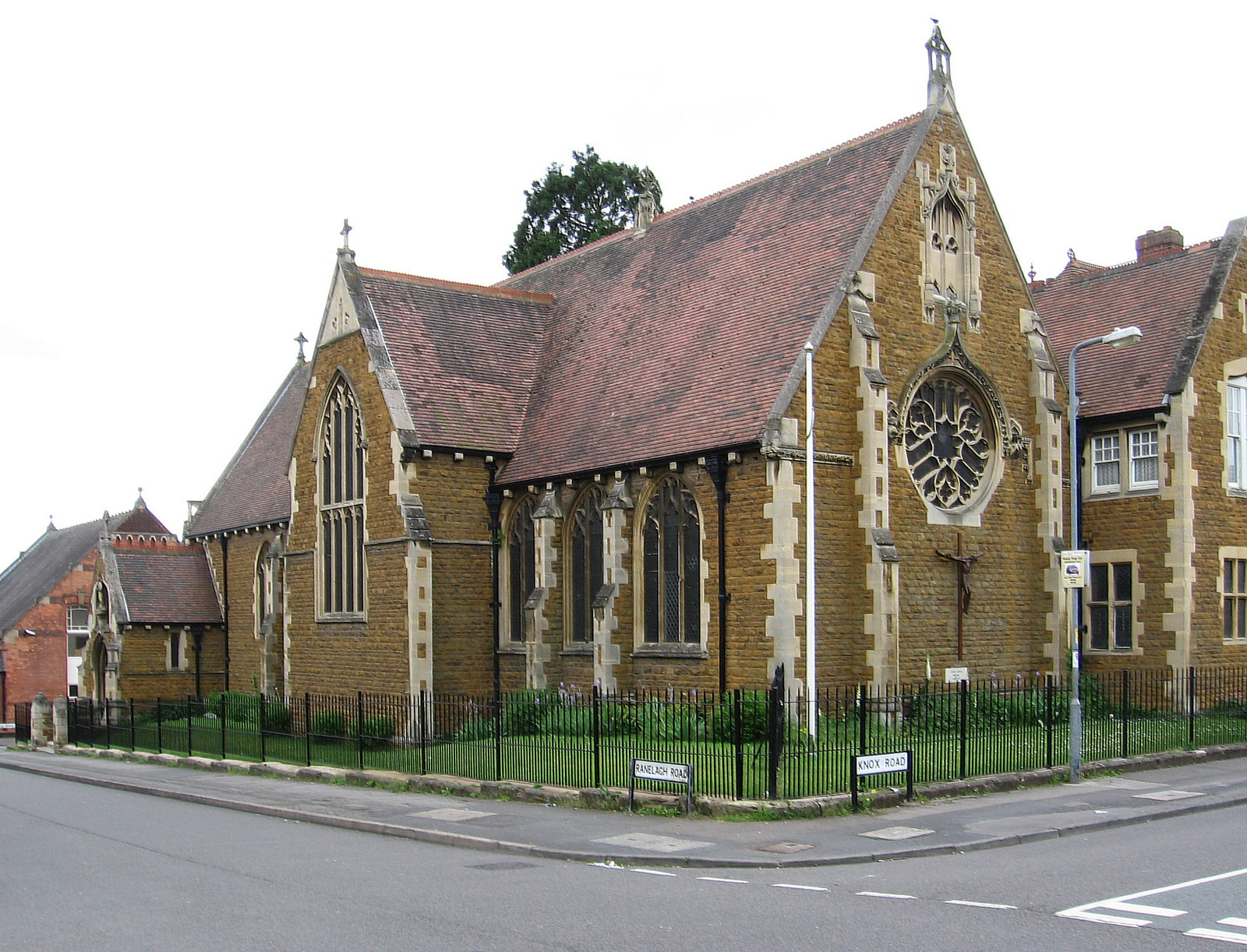
Our Lady of the Sacred Heart Church, Wellingborough

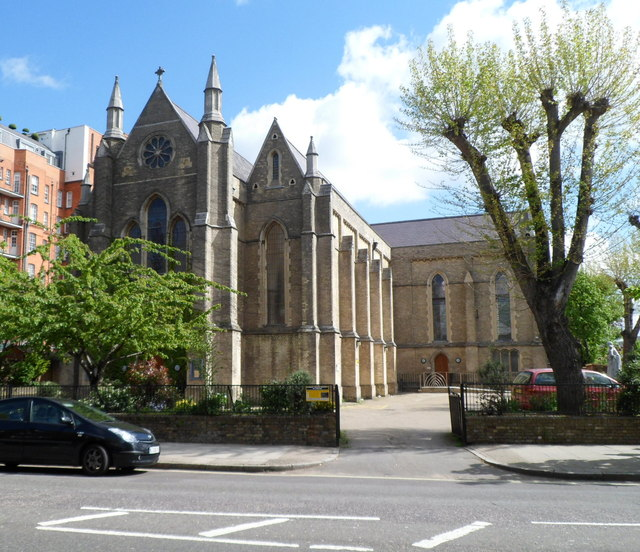
Church of Our Lady, St John's Wood

== See also ==
- Leonard Stokes
