= York Magistrates' Court =

Listed building in York, England

York and Selby Magistrates' Court
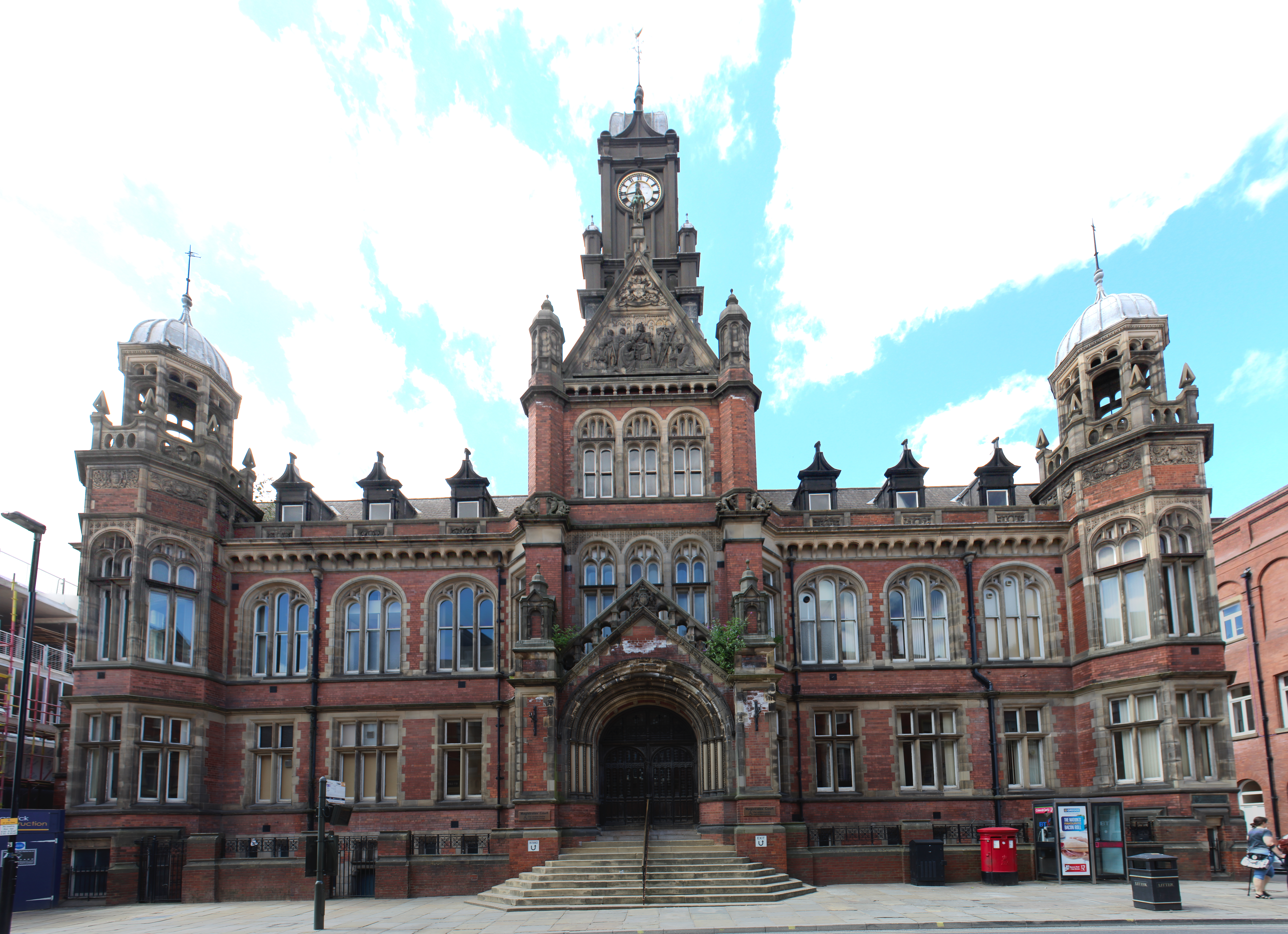
- The magistrates' court in 2018
- Interactive map of the York and Selby Magistrates' Court area
- Former names: York Magistrates' Court

General information
- Architectural style: Gothic Revival
- Location: 16 Clifford Street, York, England
- Coordinates: 53°57′22.5″N 1°4′54.4″W
- Groundbreaking: 16 July 1890
- Opened: 19 October 1892
- Cost: £17,050

Technical details
- Material: Brick, ashlar, slate

Design and construction
- Architects: Huon Arthur Matear and Henry Bloomfield Bare
- Quantity surveyor: Charles Wise
- Main contractor: Parker and Sharpe

Listed Building – Grade II
- Official name: Magistrates court and attached front wall, gates and railings
- Designated: 24 June 1983
- Reference no.: 1259239

York and Selby Magistrates' Court is a Grade II listed building on Clifford Street, in York, England.

== History and architecture ==
The foundation stone for the new Courts of Justice was laid on 16 July 1890 by Prince Albert Victor, Duke of Clarence and Avondale.

The magistrates' court was built between 1890 and 1892 to the designs of the architects Huon Arthur Matear and Henry Bloomfield Bare. The quantity surveyor was Charles Wise of Liverpool and the contract for construction was let to Parker and Sharpe of York. The cost of construction was £17,050 (equivalent to £1,873,000 in 2025).

They were opened on 19 October 1892 by the Lord Mayor of York, John Close who unveiled a bust of the late Duke of Clarence which had been sculpted by Francis John Williamson. The style of the building was a free treatment of Gothic architecture with the main entrance on Clifford Street and a projecting bay at each end carried up to octagonal turrets with carved stonework at a greater height than the remainder of the facade. In the apex of the pediment is carved the arms of the city of York and above them a figure of Justice holding the scales. Behind is a clock tower.

== See also ==
- Listed buildings in York (within the city walls, southern part)
