= Henry Bloomfield Bare =

British Architect (1848–1912)

- Born: January 21, 1848; Hungerford, Berkshire
- Died: January 8, 1912 (aged 63); Liverpool
- Occupation: Architect
- Buildings: York Magistrates’ Court

Henry Bloomfield Bare (1848–1912) was an architect based in Liverpool, England.

== Family ==
He was born on 21 January 1848 in Hungerford, Berkshire, the son of Thomas Bare (1805–1891) and Harriet Meggs (1815–1881). He married Clari Sharples (1852–1907) on 20 December 1876 in Holy Trinity Church, Southport and they had the following children:

- Elsie Bare (1877–1883)
- Cecilia Ruth Bare (1880–1962)
- Geoffrey Bare (b. 1885)

His wife Clari died on 18 August 1907 and he married Ada Rosalind Nelson (1873–1958) in 1908 in Birkenhead. He died on 8 January 1912 in Liverpool.

== Career ==
He studied architecture with Charles Edmund Giles from 1861 to 1863 and then became assistant to Thomas John Willson and Samuel Joseph Nicholl until 1868. He was District Resident Assistant on the London & North Western Railway working for William Baker from 1 September 1866 to 30 June 1876.

In 1876 he established himself in independent practice and about 10 years later formed a partnership with Henry Langton Beckwith. He became a council member of the Liverpool Architectural Society.

In 1886 he was secretary of the Liverpool International Exhibition.

He was elected a Fellow of the Royal Institute of British Architects in 1888.

== Works ==
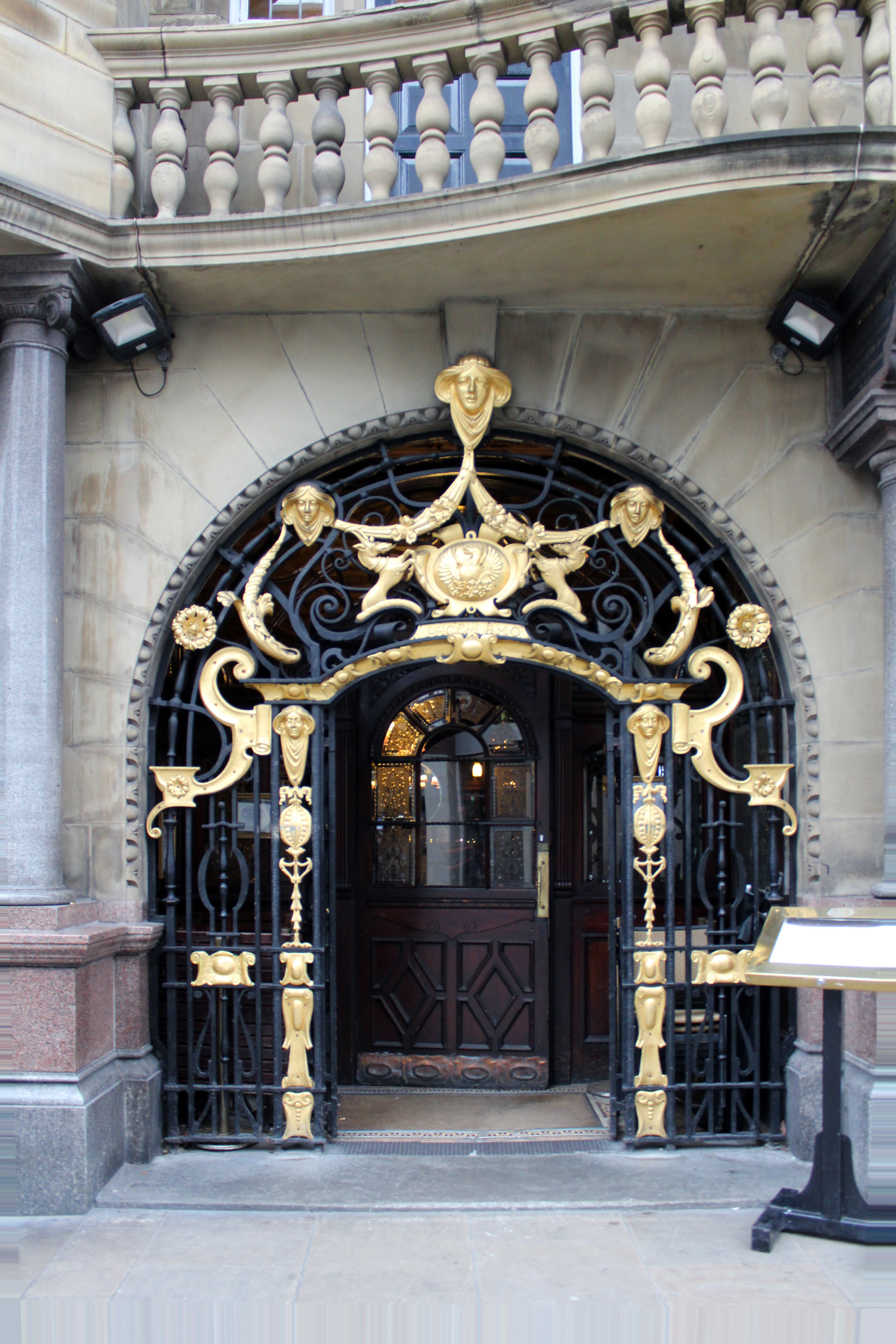
Gates at the entrance to the Philharmonic Dining Rooms

- St Peter's Church, Newton-le-Willows 1874–75 (alterations)
- St John's Church, Bootle 1878 (repairs and improvements)
- Liverpool Town Hall 1879 (redecoration)
- York Magistrates' Court 1890–92 (with Huon Arthur Matear)
- Philharmonic Dining Rooms, 36 Hope Street, Liverpool 1898 (interior decoration in conjunction with Charles John Allen)
