= Augustus Jules Bouvier =

English painter

- Born: 1827
- Died: 1881 (aged 53–54)
- Known for: Painting

Augustus Jules Bouvier (1827–1881) was a French-born English painter active in London. He exhibited at the British Institution and the Royal Academy. He is best known for oil paintings of women of the English aristocracy, but also was an accomplished water colourist.

== Career ==
Augustus Bouvier was the son of Paris-born artist Jules Bouvier (1800–1867), who moved to London with his family in 1818. His brother, Gustavus Arthur Bouvier, also became a British figure painter.

Bouvier was a student at the Royal Academy. He later went on to complete his studies in France and Italy. In 1852 he exhibited for the first time at the Royal Academy, he continued to exhibit there over the years, often with genre scenes and a series of idealised feminine portraits such as Jessica in 1854, Emily in 1857, and Hermosita in 1859. Bouvier was one of the first artists known to have exhibited at the British Institution, where he debuted with the oil painting The Fish Market in Boulogne. From 1865 onward he was a member of the New Watercolour Society.

While he specialized in figure paintings and portraits of elegantly dressed women in the English aristocracy, Bouvier also exhibited genre paintings (some of European scenes), and occasional domesticated mythological scenes like his The Three Graces of 1875. He also produced miniatures and sensitive watercolours. Influenced by the early aesthetic movement, his style relates to both Victorian academic painting and the Pre-Raphaelites.
