= Our Lady of the Sacred Heart Church, Wellingborough =

Our Lady of the Sacred Heart Church
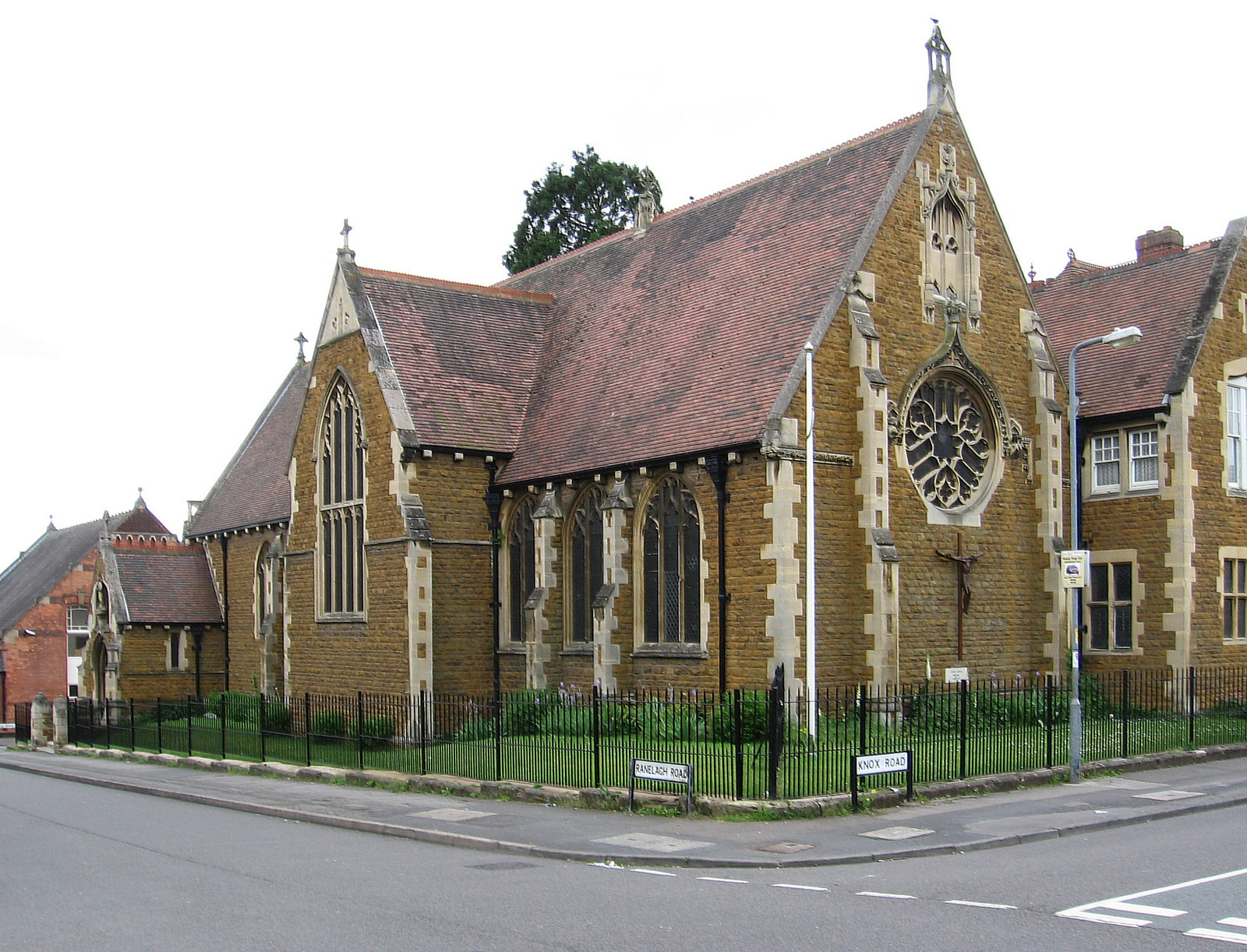
- Our Lady of the Sacred Heart Church
- 52.3025°N 0.6839°W
- Location: Wellingborough
- Country: England
- Denomination: Roman Catholic
- Website: WellingboroughCatholic.org

History
- Status: Active
- Dedication: Mary, mother of Jesus; Sacred Heart

Architecture
- Functional status: Parish church
- Heritage designation: Grade II listed
- Designated: 12 March 1986
- Architect: Samuel Joseph Nicholl
- Style: Gothic Revival
- Groundbreaking: 1884
- Completed: 2 September 1886

Administration
- Province: Westminster
- Diocese: Northampton
- Deanery: North Northants
- Parish: Our Lady of the Sacred Heart

Our Lady of the Sacred Heart Church is a Roman Catholic parish church in Wellingborough, Northamptonshire, England. It was built from 1884 to 1886 by Samuel Joseph Nicholl in the Gothic Revival style. It is located on Raneleigh Road, between Knox Road and Palk Road to the east of the town centre. It is a Grade II listed building.

== History ==
=== Foundation ===
In 1869, a mission was founded in Wellingborough. It was supported by the Arkwright family from Knuston Hall, one of whom was the High Sheriff of Northamptonshire, Herbert Robert Arkwright. Mass was celebrated in Wellingborough in rented properties.

=== Construction ===
Between 1873 and 1882, the land for the current church was bought in stages. In 1884, Samuel Joseph Nicholl was commissioned to design the church. He was from London and also designed St Charles Borromeo Church, Westminster and taught Alexander Scoles. On 2 September 1886 the church was opened. The total cost of the church was £5,281. From 1893 to 1894, the presbytery was built and came to a total cost of £1,558.

== Parish ==
The church is in the same parish as St Edmund Campion Church in Wellingborough. Our Lady of the Sacred Heart Church has three Sunday Masses at 6:00 pm on Saturday, 9:00 am on Sunday and a Polish Mass at 12:30 pm on Sunday. St Edmund's Church has two Sunday Masses at 10:30 am and 5:30 pm.

== See also ==
- Diocese of Northampton
