= St Charles Borromeo Church, Westminster =

Roman Catholic church in England

St Charles Borromeo Church
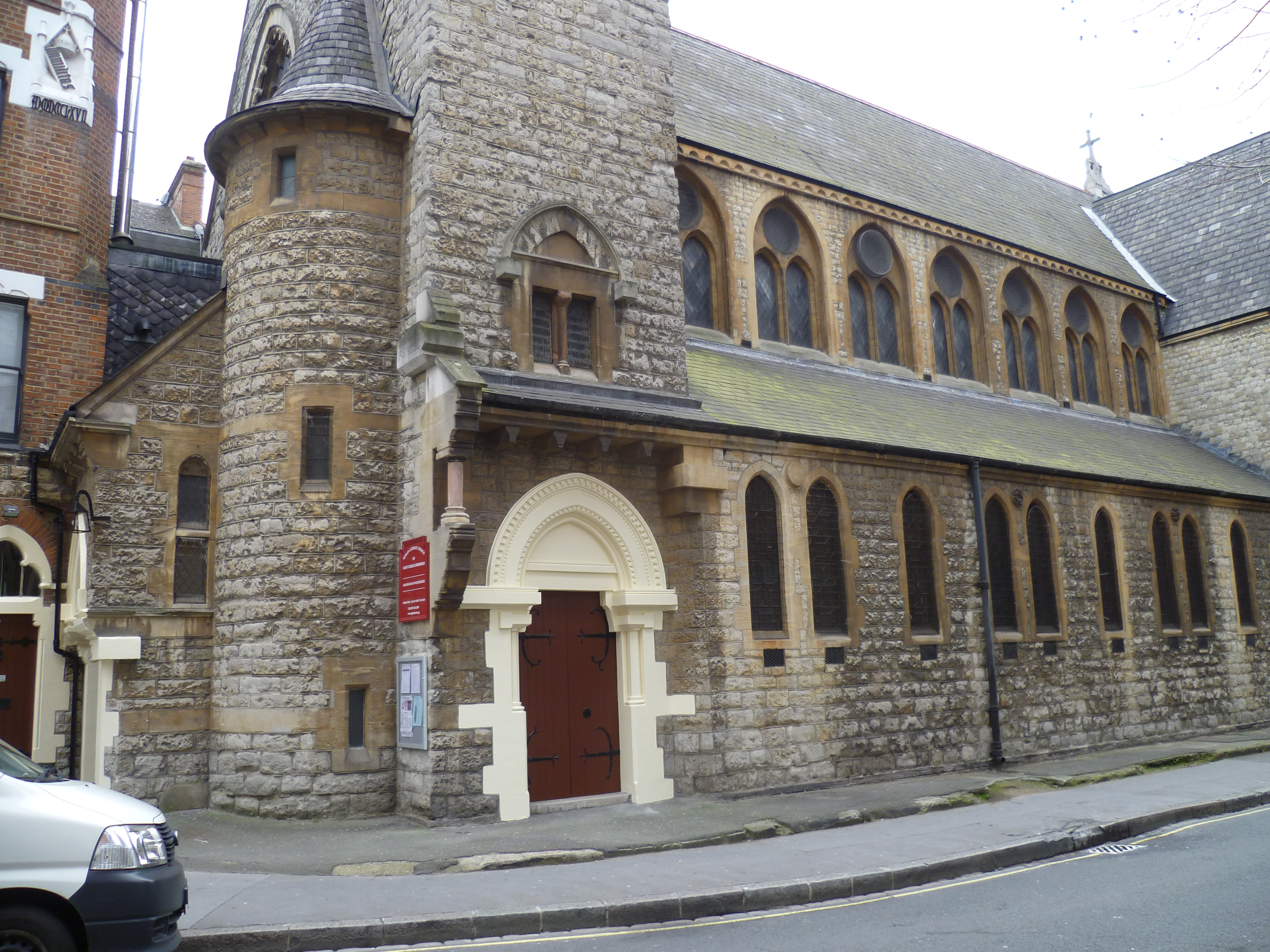
- St Charles Borromeo Church
- 51°31′12″N 0°08′24″W
- Location: London, W1
- Country: England
- Denomination: Catholic
- Website: parish.rcdow.org.uk/oglestreet/

History
- Dedication: St Charles Borromeo
- Consecrated: 1921

Architecture
- Functional status: Active
- Heritage designation: Grade II listed
- Architect(s): Samuel Joseph Nicholl & Thomas John Willson
- Style: 13th Century Pointed Gothic
- Groundbreaking: 1862
- Completed: 1865

Specifications
- Materials: Kentish ragstone

Administration
- Province: Westminster
- Archdiocese: Westminster

Clergy
- Archbishop: Richard Moth
- Rector: Fr Oscar Ardila

Saint Charles Borromeo Church is a Roman Catholic church situated on Ogle Street in Fitzrovia, within the City of Westminster in London, England. The parish church is dedicated to the 16th-century Italian saint Charles Borromeo (1538–1584), and forms part of the Archdiocese of Westminster. It has been designated a Grade II listed building since 1970.

== History ==
=== Foundation and construction ===
In 1861, a mission began: Cardinal Nicholas Wiseman appointed Fr Cornelius J. Keens (known as "Church builder") to open a chapel in a schoolroom on Little Albany Street to St Patrick's Church, Soho Square. The school's chapel was opened in Howland Mews, then moved on Little Howland Street (now Ogle Street) and became independent of the Soho parish. Fr Keens created a new mission to build the church by the end of 1861.

The dedication of Saint reflects Cardinal N. Wiseman's veneration of Saint Charles Borromeo, whose pastoral reforms in Milan he sought to model in Westminster by promoting the saint's patronage and establishing the Oblates of St Charles under Henry Edward Manning.

In 1862, a charitable benefactor secured the lease of 80 year; a plot of 90 ft by 60 ft and offered £500 for the building fund towards a permanent site of the church and Presbytery, as the Catholic population was increasing in number. On 22 August 1862, the foundation stone was blessed by Henry Edward Manning (1808–1892). The church was designed by architects Samuel Joseph Nicholl and Thomas John Willson (1824–1903) in an Early English Gothic Revival style. The first estimate was for £3,000, but the cost reached to £4,000. By February 1863, the Church was in use.

On 20 May 1863, the church opened its doors by Cardinal Wiseman.

=== Late 19th and 20 century ===
Between 1870 and 1873, the sanctuary underwent major embellishment by architect John Francis Bentley with the installation of a 30 feet high altar and reredos. In 1879, the frontal for the Lady Chapel altar was added. In 1902, the Sacred Heart Chapel was added to the church under the direction of the architect Nicholl.

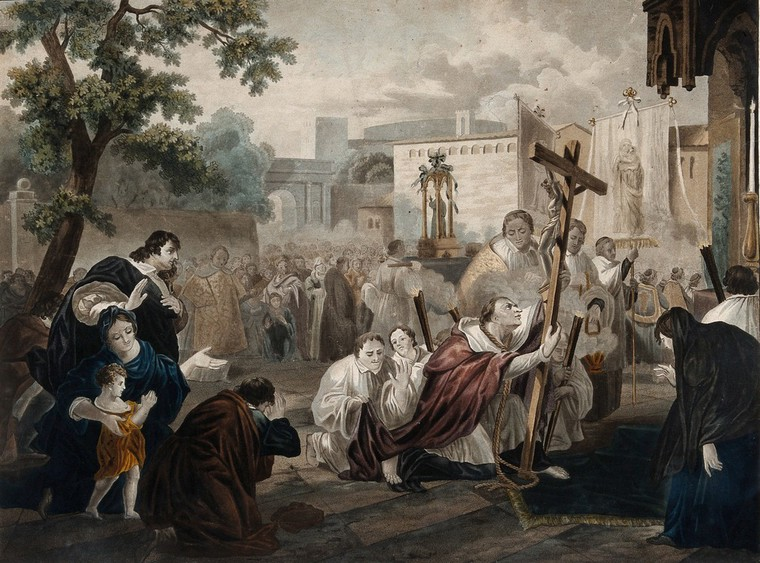
St Charles Borromeo kneels before the Cross in the plague-ridden streets of Milan (1576). Coloured aquatint by L.A. Garneray (1820) after Achille-Louis Martine (1820).

By June 1921, the lease was expired, Madame Meschini and her son Arturo purchased the land and presented it to the Archdiocese of Westminster. The church survived. On 4 October 1921, the church was consecrated by Bishop Joseph Butt †.

The building suffered from bomb damage during the London Blitz of the Second World War, resulting in the destruction of original stained glass windows and damage to the roof. Post-war repairs restored the structural fabric of the building, and the interior was restored in 1957–63 and again in 1978–80, when the reredos was restored and a large forward altar was installed by Michael Anderson.

On 5 February 1970, the church was designated a Grade II listed building by Historic England.

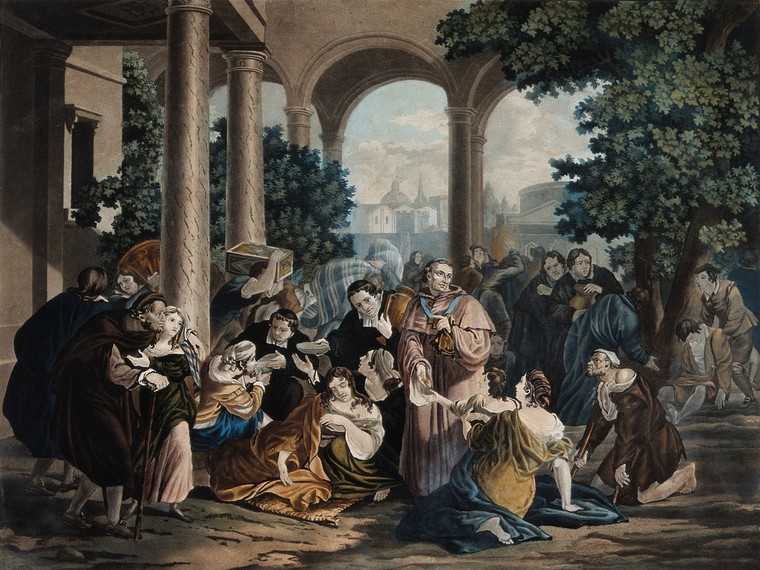
St Charles Borromeo gives alms to the plague-victims in Milan. Coloured aquatint by L.A. Garneray (1820)

=== Post-Vatican II recording and modern period ===
In 1978, the sanctuary was reordered following the liturgical reforms of the Second Vatican Council.

Today, the church serves the local Catholic community and acts as a center for the Neocatechumenal Way in central London.

== Architecture ==
The church has an early English Pointed Gothic Revival style using Kentish ragstone with Bath stone dressings. The architects were Samuel Joseph Nicholl, in partnership with Thomas John Willson son of Edward James Willson (1787–1854) and the two builders were Messrs Patman and Fotheringham.

=== Exterior features ===
The church has a distinctive helical staircase turret near the main entrance that extended outward to effect. The nave roof is boarded, angular and corbelled out.

=== Interior layout ===
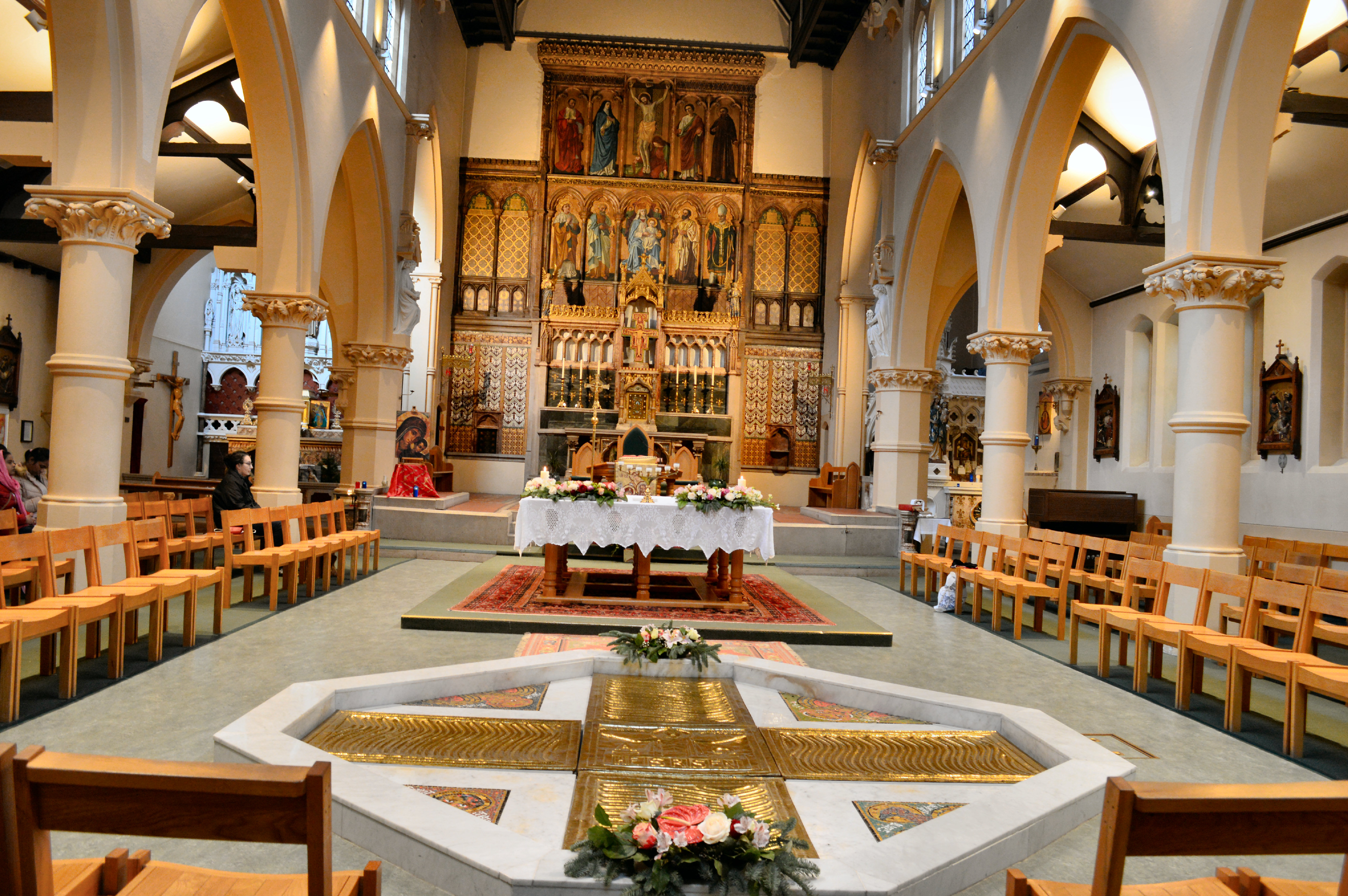
Saint Charles Borromeo's church interior view

A step into the entry point that sites directly behind the small main entrance door on Ogle Street (at the junction where the church meets the presbyter) there is narthex. Its liturgical position functions as an inner vestibule an entryway at the far end of the nave, opposite the main altar.

The chancel laid out, a focal point of the church into the nave facing the altar. In 1984, an octagonal immersion baptismal font was constructed in the center of the nave, designed by Michael Anderson in collaboration with Mattia del Prete and Antonio Incognito of Rome, one of the earliest full-immersion fonts installed in a modern English Catholic parish. The church is oriented with the altar facing north-west rather than the traditional east. It lacks only east windows. The west windows and the transept consist of lancets surmounted by plate tracery.

Appearance to the Disciples by Kiko Argüello

Approaching the helical staircase, directly beneath west-end narthex, the basement extends downwards into excavated parish rooms. Two of these rooms were created during major structural renovations in 1989–1990, with three additional rooms excavated below the east end. The walls of these rooms are filled with religious artwork by Spanish painter Kiko Argüello, founder of Neocatechumenal Way, including a notable mural depicting the Appearance to the Disciples (Aparición a los discipulos), 'Peace Be With You'.

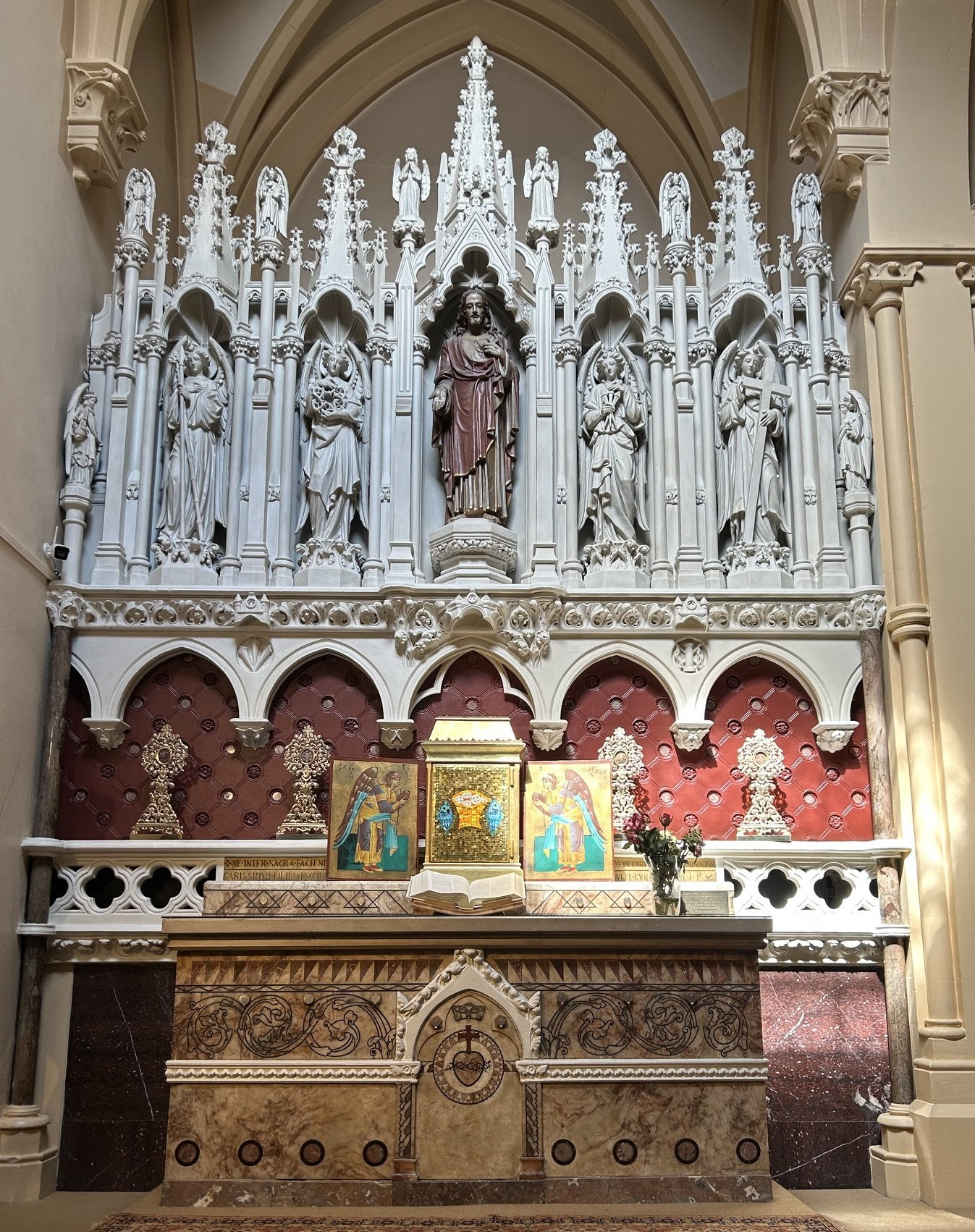
The Sacred Heart Chapel

==== Fixtures & artwork ====
The reredos in the Sacred Heart chapel, designed by S.J. Nicholl, was added in 1902, with four angels in niches holding the instruments of the Passion; in the central niche is a statue of the Sacred Heart by Theodore Phyffers (1821–1876), a Belgian-born sculptor working in London.

The reredos features ten panels painted on slate by artist Nathaniel Westlake, depicting the Crucifixion alongside images of the Virgin Mary, St Joseph, St Peter, and St Charles Borromeo.

There are four stained glass windows in the south aisle of Saints Patrick, Margaret, Cecilia (1898) and Thomas of Canterbury.

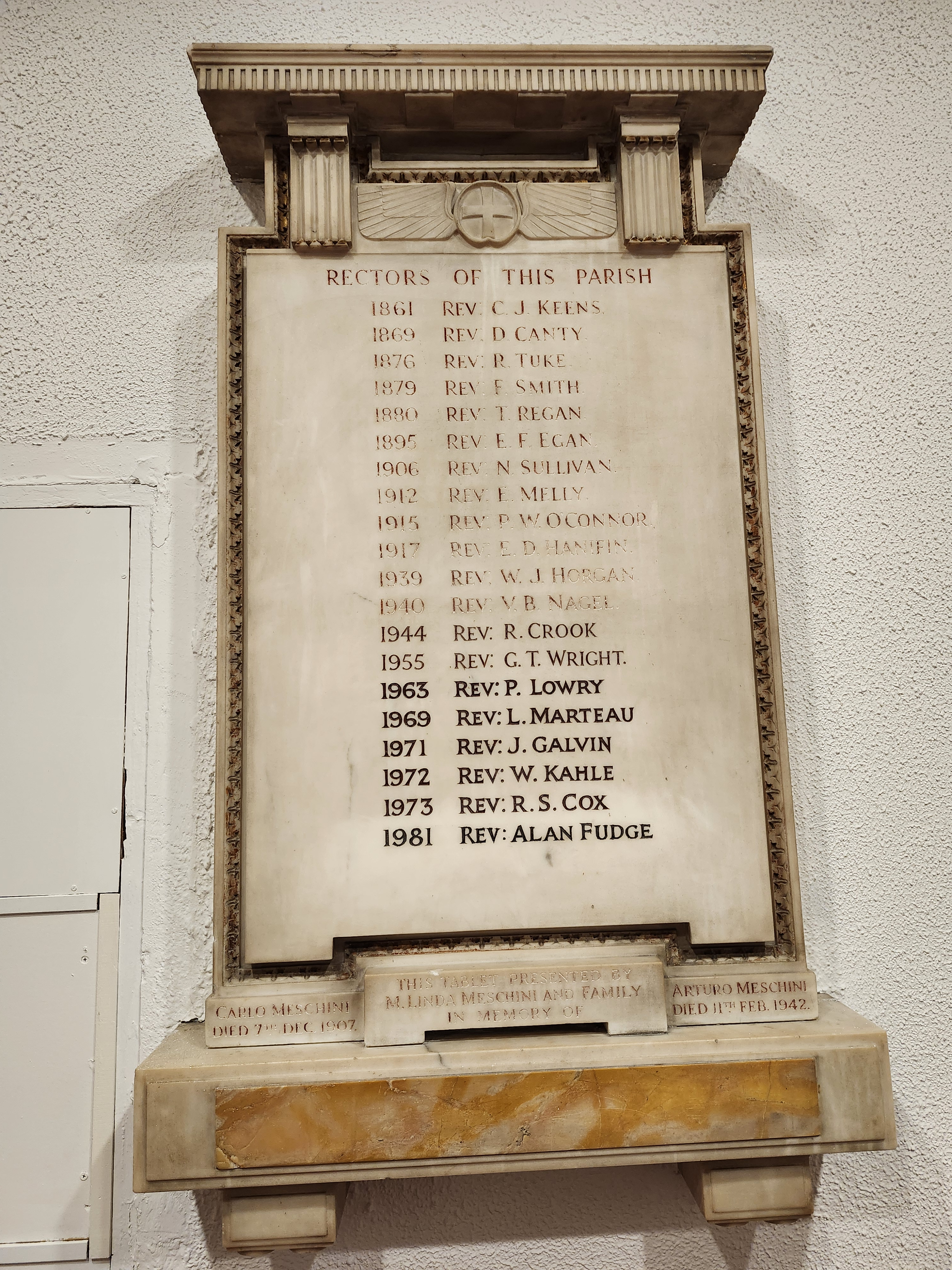
Rectors' plaque, records until 1981

== Rectors ==
- 1861 Cornelius James Keens † (1828–1905)
- 1869 Daniel Canty † (1833–1892)
- 1876 Reginald Tuke † (1839–1911)
- 1879 Frederick Smith † (1843–1916)
- 1880 Thomas Regan † (1840–1902)
- 1895 Edmund Francis Egan † (1846–1926)
- 1906 Nicholas George Sullivan † (1869–1955)
- 1912 Edward J. Melly † (1874- )
- 1915 Percy William O'Connor † (1875–1942)
- 1917 Ernest D. Hanifin † (1880–1949)
- 1939 William J. Horgan † (1889–1943)
- 1940 V. B. Nagel †
- 1944 R. Crook †
- 1955 G. T. Wright †
- 1963 P. Lowry †
- 1969 Louis Marteau † (1928–2002)
- 1971 Jeremiah Galvin †
- 1972-1973 Francis Wahle † (1929–2024)
- 1973-1981 Ronald S. Cox † (1929–1994)
- 1981-2011 Alan James Fudge † (1940–2011)
- 2011-2018 Bryan Jones † (1945–2020)
- 2018-2022 David Barrow
- 2022–present Oscar Ardila

== Music ==
The church's history records two pipe organs, and possibly a harmonium.

The first was a second-hand instrument by an unknown builder, which had reached the end of its working life by the early 1920s. It was succeeded by a new two-manual organ — the builder's identity now forgotten — dedicated in 1926, with its console on the choir gallery and its pipework housed in the space adjoining the presbytery.

By the early 1980s the pedalboard, and eventually the instrument as a whole, was failing. It was donated free of charge to the newly rebuilt Our Lady Queen of All Creation in Hemel Hempstead, where part of its original pipework was incorporated into a new organ by Vincent Woodcock. Work was completed in 1988 and the instrument still stands today.

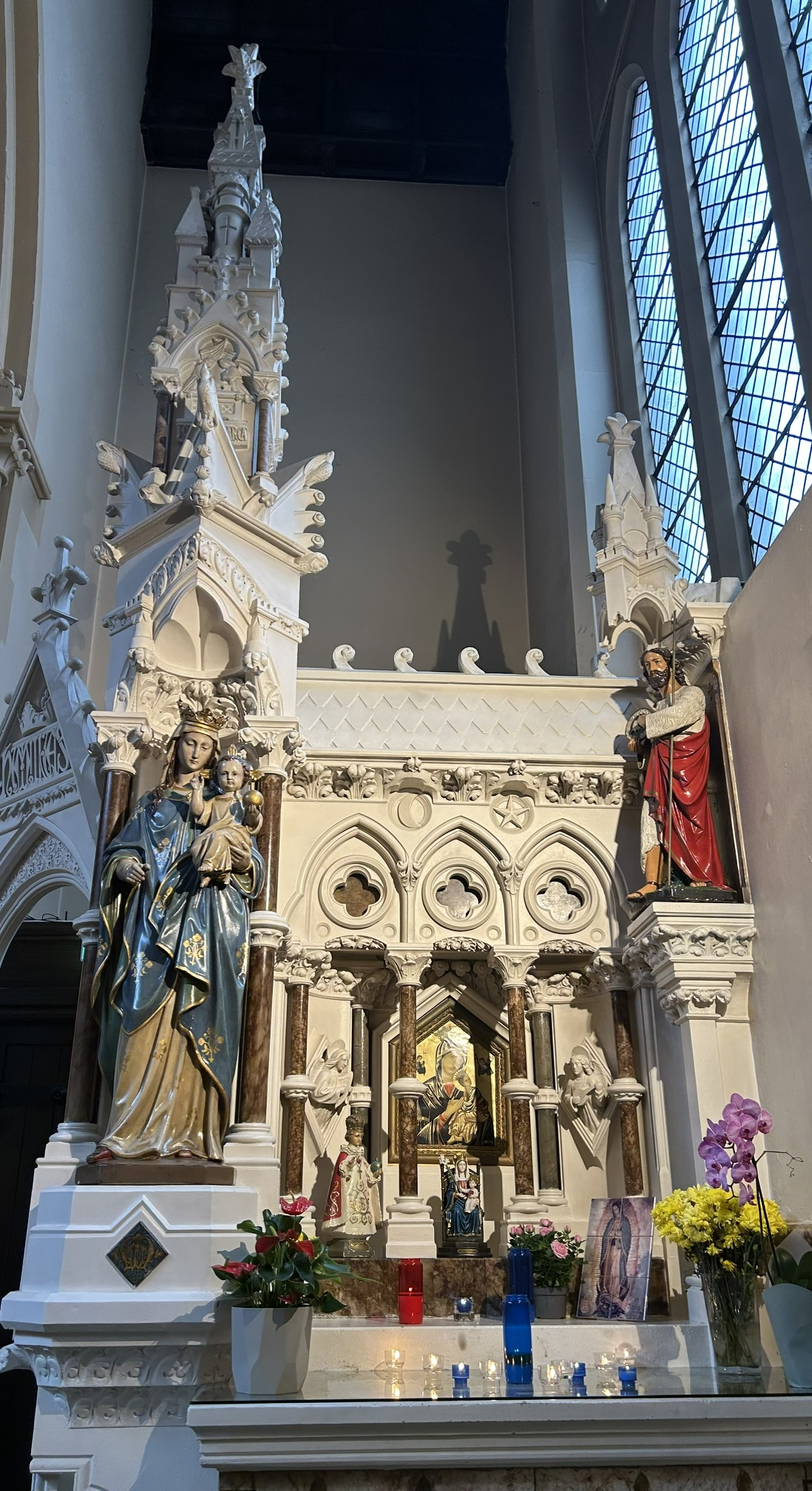
Interior front view - the Lady Chapel, showing the altar and the stained glass windows

=== Organists and directors of music ===
- Thomas Cooke 1863–1877
- Thomas Casserley 1877–1902, then retired

Choir disbanded by 1912, then re-established in 1915

- Ernest Oldmeadow 1910s

Choir formed of both men and women for the first time

- Harold Cooper by 1919
- Grace Miller 1920s
- Mr Pinnock from 1925

Choir disbanded during WWII, re-established afterwards

- no organist, until
- David Black 1960s
- Sr Angela Sumner c.1960s-1973, and Stephen de Winter from 1969

Choir disbanded for the 3rd time in 1973

- Stephen de Winter 1969–2018, then moved to Our Lady of Hal, Camden Town (2018–2020)
- Interregnum 2019–2025

Choir re-established in 2025

- José Blasco Sánchez & Howard Lee 2025–2026
- Howard Lee 2026-

== Artworks ==
During the Counter-Reformation and subsequent centuries, Saint Charles Borromeo was a popular subject in European religious art. In the late 18 century, Giovanni Battista Tiepolo painted St Charles Borromeo Venerating the Crucifix as part of a series of altarpieces for the church of San Pascual Baylon in Aranjuez. The painting's composition was also translated into an etching around 1770 by his son, Lorenzo Tiepolo reproducing composition of the saint engaged in personal, meditative prayer before a crucifix.

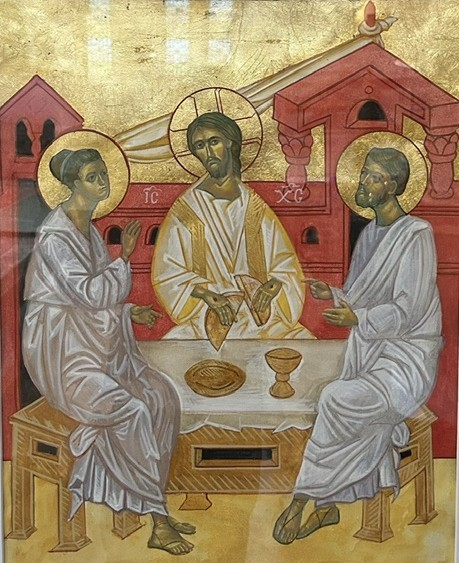
Married Couple at Emmaus (2016), by Mike Quirke

The parish houses several pieces of contemporary sacred art. Among these is the Supper at Emmaus (also known as Married Couple at Emmaus) an icon (2016) by modern expressionist artist Mike Quirke, depicting Cleopas and his wife.

== See also ==
- Catholic church in England and Wales
- List of Catholic saints
- Catholic art
- List of Catholic artists

== Gallery ==
The Second Coming of Christ, by Kiko Argüello

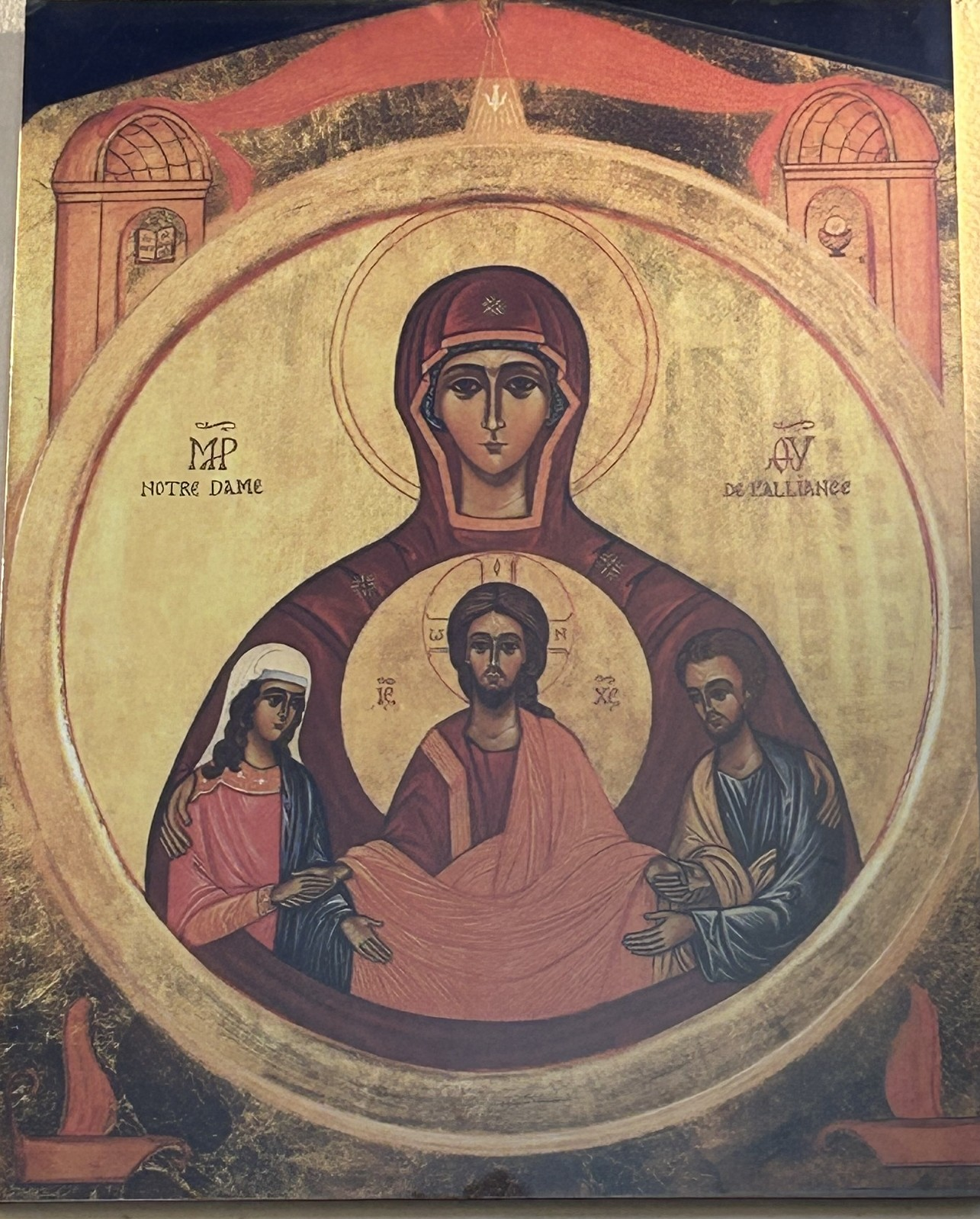
Notre Dame de L'Alliance (Our Lady of the Covenant) (1987), by Sr Marie-Paul Farran, OSB

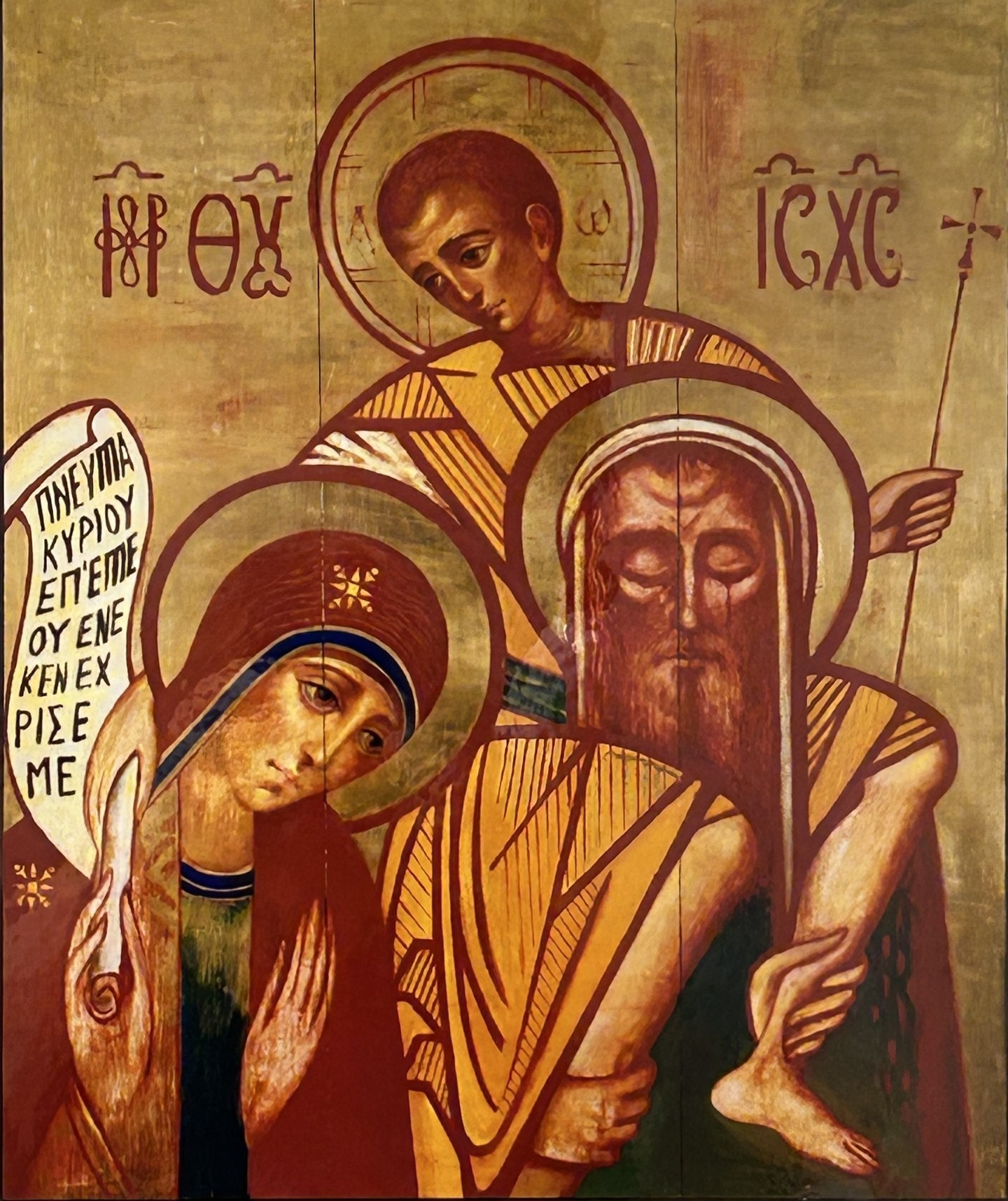
The Holy Family of Nazareth (1997), by Francisco 'Kiko' Argüello

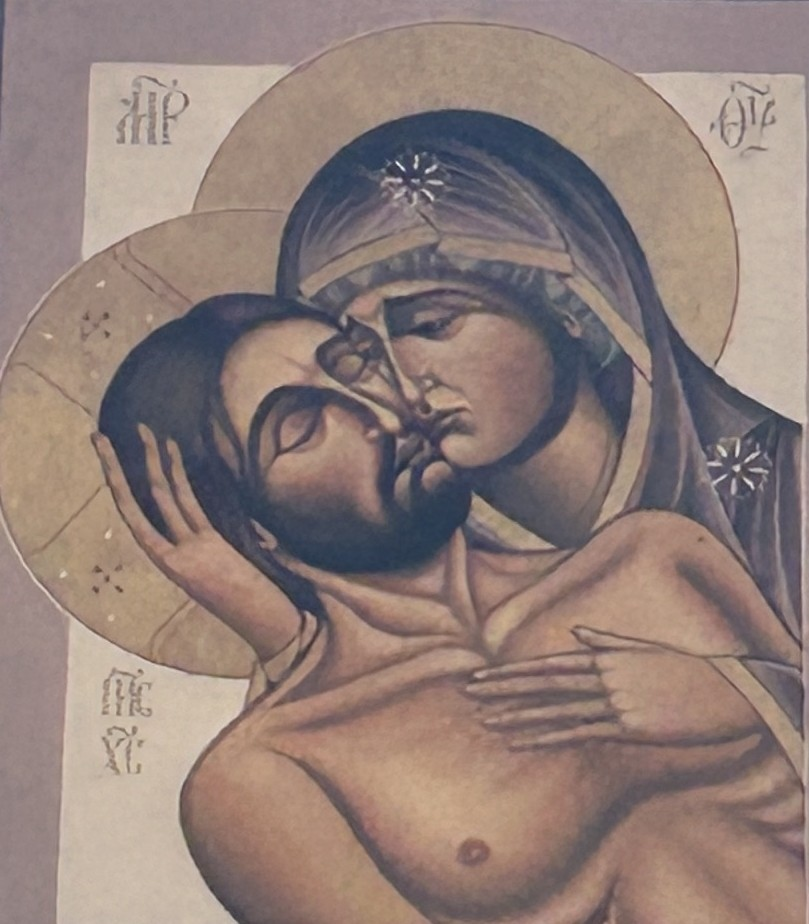
Our Lady of Magadan, by Fr. William Hart McNichols

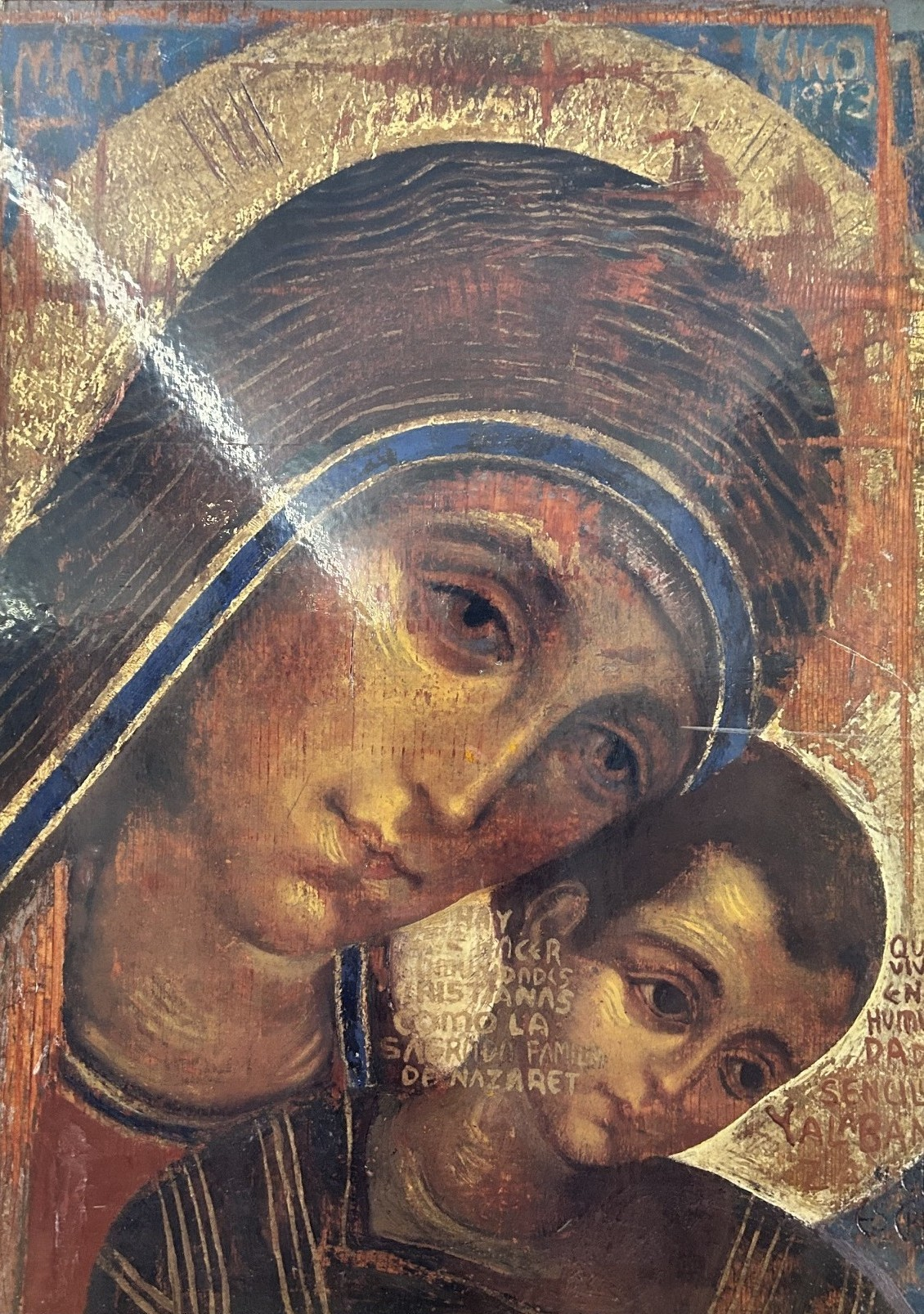
The Virgin of the Way (1973), after icon Panagia Kykkotissa, by Kiko Argüello

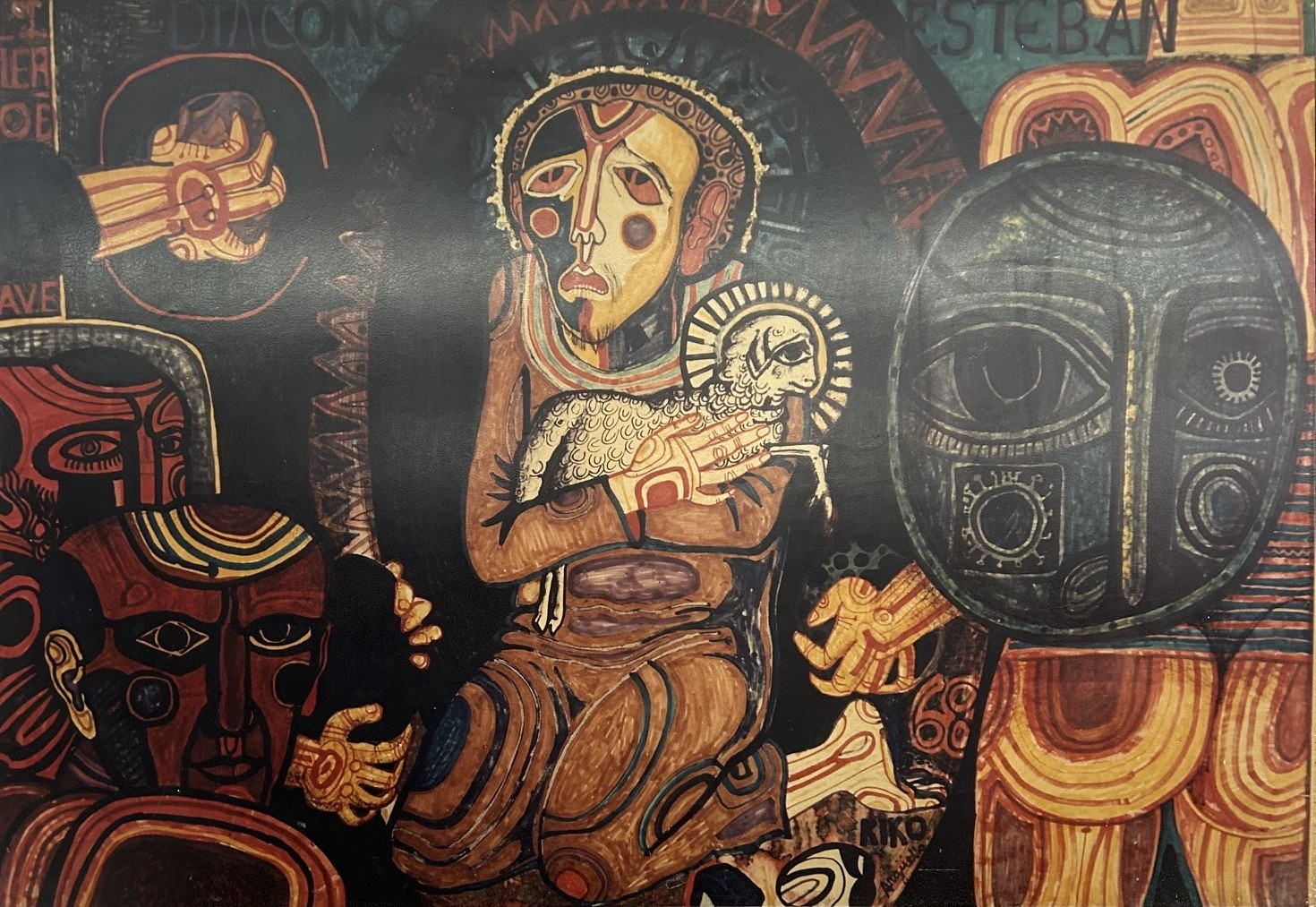
El Diacono Esteban (Saint Stephen the Deacon) (1968), by Kiko Argüello

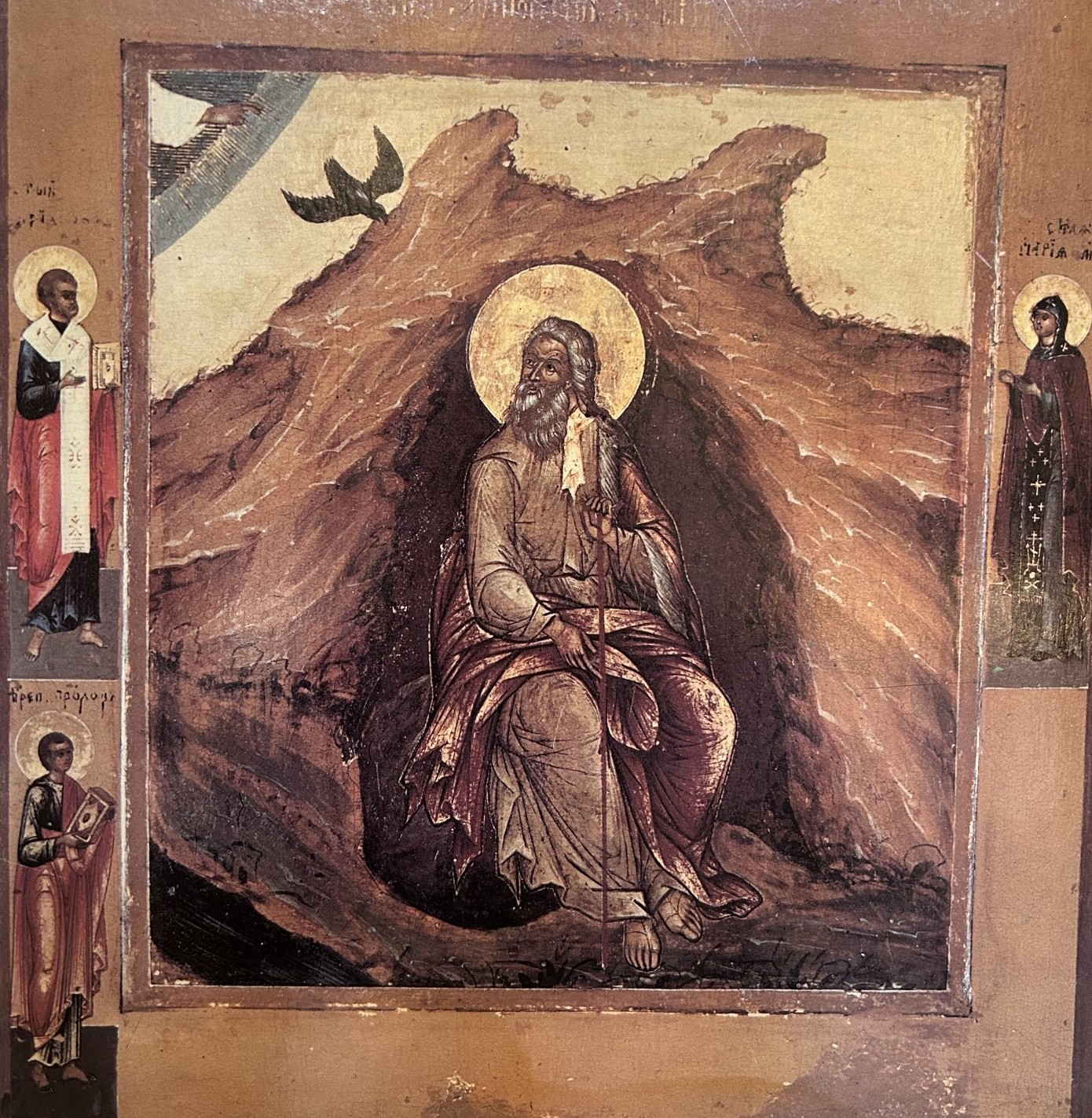
The Prophet Elijah (Elias) in the Wilderness (1672), by Fyodor Zubov
