= Sunfield Children's Home =

Location
- Clent Grove; Clent; Worcestershire, DY9 9PB; England; 52.41884°N 2.11327°W

Information
- Type: Private special school and children's home
- Established: 1930
- Founders: Friedrich Geuter; Michael Wilson
- Department for Education URN: 117033 Tables
- Ofsted: Reports
- Gender: Mixed
- Age: 6 to 19
- Enrolment: 23 as of February 2017
- Website: http://www.sunfield.org.uk/

Sunfield Garden School and Children's Home is a private special school, Children's Home and charity on the border of Worcestershire and the West Midlands in England. It was founded in 1930 and now supports boys and girls, aged 6 – 19 years, with complex learning needs, including autism.

== General outline ==
Sunfield offers 38- and 52-week residential placements to students from across the UK, as well as day places to students from neighbouring local authorities.

It supports young people with a range of learning and behavioural needs, including Autism spectrum Disorder (ASD), Attention deficit hyperactivity disorder (ADHD), Down syndrome, Epilepsy and Pathological demand avoidance Syndrome (PDA).

Sunfield is on the list of Secretary of State Approved Independent Special Institutions.

== Founding ==
Sunfield was established in 1930 by Friedrich Geuter and Michael Wilson, based on the principles of Austrian philosopher Rudolf Steiner. This impetus established Sunfield as one of the leading Curative Educational Communities in the UK.

Fried Geuter, a co-worker of Dr. Ita Wegman in Switzerland, had come to the UK at Wegman's request to establish anthroposophical special education there. He and his wife, Maria, took charge of a home for children with disabilities in Kent.

Fried was invited to lecture on his work to the anthroposophical group of Theodora Wilson, in Selly Oak. Here, he was introduced to Theodora's son Michael, who was the second conductor of the British National Opera Orchestra and a violinist and composer.

Some time later, Michael Wilson discontinued his musical career and Fried left the home in Kent. Together, they founded Sunfield in a house in Selly Oak, close to the Wilson family home of Elmfield. It was named after the original therapeutic home of Dr Wegman, the "Sonnenhof" in Arlesheim, Switzerland. A small Rudolf Steiner school was also started at Elmfield, run by Eileen Hutchins for the Sunfield co-workers' children.

A considerable number of talented artists and other professional persons were drawn to the initiative including the painter and later painting therapist, Liane Collot d'Herbois; the musicians Mary and John Kobbe; Walter Braithwaite, Eileen Hutchins’ sister Shirley amongst others. Other early supporters included David Clement, well known throughout the anthroposophical movement, and Lady Cynthia Chance, whose family once owned Clent Grove, where Sunfield is now located, close to the new site of the Elmfield Steiner school in Stourbridge.

== History ==
In the early days, treatment of disability was often ‘out of sight, out of mind’ but the team at Sunfield believed in pioneering a different, more holistic, approach to the care and education of disabled children. Throughout World War II, Sunfield continued its work and even accommodated the children of Elmfield school for a time.

In 1947, Fried Geuter and Michael Wilson approached the anthroposophical mathematician and General Secretary of the Anthroposophical Society in Britain, George Adams Kaufmann, to settle in Clent. There, Adams and Michael Wilson founded the Goethean Science Foundation, for the purpose of supporting anthroposophical scientific research. Olive Whicher also moved there to participate in this research work. Many other anthroposophical initiatives were also inspired by the work at Sunfield over the years, including the Park Attwood Clinic in Kidderminster, and Hawkwood College.

Fried Geuter left Sunfield Homes in 1951, with his second wife, Isabel Newitt, who had been a co-worker there with him. They went on to found the Ravenswood community in 1953. Fried's son joined Sunfield and continued his father's work with Michael Wilson, who remained a director for 40 years after Sunfield's foundation.

In 1954, Clive Robbins joined his wife Mildred at Sunfield. In 1958, an American composer and professor of music, Paul Nordoff, visited and was asked by Dr Herbert Geuter, the son of Fried Geuter, to play to one of the children and observe their reactions. The results inspired Nordoff to give up his academic career and devote the remainder of his life to developing music as a therapy. He and Clive worked together for the next 17 years to establish Nordoff-Robbins music therapy, which is still practised in many countries today.

In 1962, Sunfield became the first home of Emerson College, which was founded there by Francis Edmunds, his wife Elizabeth who was working as a colleague at Sunfield, Michael Wilson and David Clement. They were initially joined by 11 students from the United States of America, New Zealand, South Africa, Norway, France and Britain. Emerson offered a foundation year in Anthroposophy followed by specialised courses in Waldorf education, Biodynamics and later other courses.

At the time, the Stourbridge area was cited as being probably the area of greatest anthroposophical activity in the country. It included Elmfield School, Sunfield, Broome Biodynamic Farm and the Goethean Science Foundation. Many of the people involved in these activities could therefore be called upon as visiting teachers to the new college. During the summer of 1964, Emerson College moved from Clent to Forest Row.

By 1968, a new hall had been built at Sunfield, as well as a specially designed pool for hydro and colour therapy. As Sunfield developed, the children were also encouraged to become involved in the growing of produce and animal husbandry at Sunfield's farm. Therapies involving play, painting, colour, music and movement and were researched and promoted. Michael Wilson himself pioneered colour therapy, water therapy, other artistic therapies, and assisted in the establishment of music therapy.

Sunfield is once again closely associated with Steiner's principles and follows the principles of Practical Skills Therapeutic Skills Education (PSTE) method that draws its inspiration from the insights of Rudolf Steiner, John Ruskin and William Morris.

== Arms ==
Coat of arms of Sunfield Children's Home
Notes granted 1 October 1990 Crest Upon a Mount of New Red Sandstone in front of an Oak grove proper a representation of the Folly known as Clent Castle Argent rising above the battlements thereof a Sun Gold. Escutcheon Vert in dexter chief a Sun in Splendour and in base two Bars triple arched. Supporters Standing on a mound of New Red Sandstone proper on the dexter side a Wolf and on the sinister side a Goat both Argent the latter armed unguled and bearded Or. Motto In God's Light We Stand
