= George Adams Kaufmann =

British mathematician and translator

George Adams Kaufmann, also George Adams and George von Kaufmann, (8 February 1894, Maryampol, Galicia, then part of the Austro-Hungarian Empire – 30 March 1963, Edgbaston, UK) was a British mathematician, translator, and anthroposophist. He travelled widely, spoke several languages and translated many of Rudolf Steiner’s lectures into English. Through his studies in theoretical physics, he contributed to the expansion and development of the natural sciences as extended by the concepts of anthroposophy.

== Youth ==
His father, Georg von Kaufmann, a British subject of German descent, was a pioneer of the oil industry. His mother was born Kate Adams in England. Shortly after George's birth, the family moved to Solotwina in the foothills of the Carpathians. In 1897, when he was three years old, his parents divorced. His father retained custody of the children and it was only a short while before her death in 1935, that Adams saw his mother again.

The father married again – a young German woman, who created for George and his siblings a happy childhood. Educated by English governesses, he was raised to fluency in several languages, primarily English, German and Polish. From 1905, Adams attended Mill Hill School in England, travelling home alone to his family in Galicia. In 1912 he entered Christ's College, Cambridge to read Chemistry, completing his BA in 1915. He was president of Cambridge University Socialist Society in 1915.

Preoccupied with problems of social reform, he rejected all manner of violence, remaining a conscientious objector throughout the First World War – a "militant revolutionary" as he described himself. He was imprisoned after refusing to serve with other conscientious objectors in the Non-Combatant Corps and was only released in 1919, after a hunger strike. The atomistic and materialistic thoughts of his time failed to satisfy him, causing him to seek for alternatives in the work of Alfred North Whitehead and Bertrand Russell. On questioning Russell on how to reach satisfactory conclusions in theoretical physics without the hypothesis of the atom, Russell encouraged him to study projective geometry. Following this advice, Adams began to concern himself primarily with mathematics and theoretical physics. He heard lectures by G. H. Hardy and began to research projective, non-Euclidean geometry.

== Encounter with anthroposophy ==
In 1914 he had encountered Rudolf Steiner’s "Occult Science" and become a member of the Emerson Group in London in 1916. During his time as conscientious objector he had come to know Mary Fox, a Quaker and in 1920 they married.

His interest in Steiner's ideas on social reform and his intention to translate the book The Threefold Social Order (GA 23) caused him to visit Steiner together with Ethel Bowen Wedgwood in Dornach, Switzerland. Steiner advised him to become involved in some form of social work, something Adams could readily accept amid the social collapse in Central and Eastern Europe following the war. He went on several journeys to Poland as part of the English and American Quaker organisation.

In 1920 he took part in the inauguration of the first Goetheanum building. On his return to England, he cooperated with some friends on spreading the ideas of Social threefolding as well as the anthroposophical ideas of Steiner. His wife Mary Adams began her work as librarian and translator for the Anthroposophical Society in London that she was to carry for many years. In addition, Adams was the free verbal translator of around 110 lectures of Steiner into English. He went on to translate many of Steiner's written works, often with Mary Adams.

He was often in Dornach during these times and experienced the burning of the first Goetheanum on New Year's Eve 1922/23 and was part of the Christmas Foundation meeting of the General Anthroposophical Society in 1923/24. In 1924 he became one of the Goetheanum-Speakers authorised by Steiner.

== Research and work ==
While working as a free co-worker of the Anthroposophical Society in Britain as lecturer and workshop holder after 1925, Adams turned again to the study of the natural sciences and mathematics, concentrating particularly on projective geometry and working with Elisabeth Vreede, leader of the Section for Mathematics and Astronomy at the Goetheanum. At the beginning of the 1930s, Adams published a series of articles and essays about projective, synthetic geometry and its relationship to physics, to Goethe's theory of metamorphosis and to anthroposophical spiritual science, particularly the pioneering work "Of Etheric Space" in the magazine Natura of the Goetheanum's Medical Section. Here for the first time is mentioned the concept of "counter-space", as Steiner indicated in the third of his courses on the Natural Sciences (GA 323), explained by means of non-Euclidean geometry. Some years later Louis Locher was to discover the same thing independently of Adams. From that time on the conceptual development of the idea of counter-space in its relation to normal spatial thinking became the focal point of Adams' further scientific research. In 1933 the comprehensive work Space and the Light of the Creation – Synthetic Geometry in the light of Spiritual Science appeared, which was an overview of the spiritual scientific meaning of synthetic geometry.

When Elisabeth Vreede and Ita Wegman were dismissed from the executive of the General Anthroposophical Society in Dornach, a number of other prominent members of the German, Dutch and British Societies were expelled, including Adams. This brought to an end his cooperation with the Mathematical/Astronomical Section. When the Chairman of the Anthroposophical Society in Great Britain, D. N. Dunlop, died in May 1935, Adams took over as general secretary. In this task, Olive Whicher became his closest co-worker, and he introduced her to projective geometry.

== Wartime years ==
At the outbreak of the Second World War, Adams volunteered as interpreter in a prisoner of war camp. His close ties to Germany were soon the subject of investigation and he was dismissed after six months. He changed his name at this point from George Kaufmann to George Adams, taking the maiden name of his mother. In the following years Adams was one of the monitors of the Polish broadcasting corporation in the service of the BBC and he learnt several additional Slavic languages. Much of his free time was spent in the British Library studying the development of modern mathematical sciences to augment them with his thoughts about counter-space.

After the war, he was given a scholarship by the British Anthroposophical Society at Rudolf Steiner House to investigate with Whicher the geometric principles underlying the world of plants. It had been unclear where the corresponding projective counterpart of the infinite plane of Euclidean space, the infinite midpoint of the non-Euclidean space (called by Locher the "absolute midpoint") was to be found in the plant world. In 1947, Adams expressed the idea that such a midpoint did not just exist, but that there was one to be found in every bud. This idea was connected with that of the lemniscatory correlation between space and counter-space and further researched by Whicher and himself. In 1949 and 1952, two books appeared with the titles: The Living Plant and the Science of Physical and Ethereal Space and The Plant between Sun and Earth.

== The Goethean Science Institute ==
In 1947, at the request of his friends Fried Geuter and Michael Wilson of Sunfield Homes in Clent near Birmingham, Whicher and he moved to Clent, where they founded the Goethean science Foundation with Wilson to undertake scientific research. The peaceful countryside and a secure financial base provided an ideal environment for the work that followed.

Shortly before this, in 1946, Adams had made contact with the Goetheanum and its Mathematical-Astronomical Section under the provisional guidance of Louis Locher. He wished, despite their differences, to work together on common issues. He again participated actively in many conferences and discussions at the Goetheanum and in Germany. He also took up contact again with Georg Unger, who went on to found the Mathematisch-Physicalisches Institut in 1956, where Adams reported regularly on his work. Unger visited Clent for common research gatherings.

== Collaboration with Unger, Leroi and Schwenk ==
Adams began his research on rigid body statics and dynamics in mechanics from the point of view of space and counter-space on the basis of projective linear geometry. The results were published in the late 1950s in the magazine Mathematisch-Physikalische Korrespondenz edited by Unger and appeared in book form in 1996. Based on the groundwork done by a number of mathematicians like Felix Klein, Arthur Cayley, William K. Clifford and Eduard Study, Adams pursued the idea of counter-space into the concrete details of rigid body statics and dynamics (in non-Euclidean spaces). Peter Gschwind was to build on this research and lead it into the sphere of Quantum physics.

Adams and Unger also began to collaborate with Alexandre Leroi and Theodor Schwenk, leading to the establishment of the Instituts für Strömungsforschung in Herrischried in the Black Forest. During the last years of his life, Adams expended a lot of his energy on this project, desiring to test the efficacy of his ideas on space and counter-space into the realm of technology. He worked out specific planes (W-planes) and with John Wilkes built models for the self-purification and re-enlivening of water through special forms. He often worked in Herrischried with Whicher, following with interest the research of Leroi and Schwenk.

After a light stroke in August 1959, Adams divided his time between the Black Forest and England devoting much time to the translation of works of Steiner.

He is reported to have combined several polarities in character: on the one hand multilingual and worldly, he tended on the other to be shy and strangely innocent; a clear thinker schooled in mathematics, chemistry and physics, his relationship to nature was rather more introspective and religious; he allowed himself to be incarcerated for his convictions, while in his relationships he showed extreme modesty, humour and never allowed his knowledge to become overbearing.

== Books ==
- Fruits of Anthroposophy, London 1922
- Christ and the Earth, London 1927
- Synthetische Geometrie, Goethesche Metamorphosenlehre und Mathematische Physik, in: Mathesis, Stuttgart 1931
- The Anthroposophical Movement, London 1932
- Von dem ätherischen Raume, in: Na 1932–33, Nr. 5/6
- Space and the Light of the Creation, London 1933
- Christ in the Power of Memory and the Power of Love, East Grinstead 1938
- The Mysteries of the Rose-Cross, East Grinstead 1955, London
- Physical and Ethereal Spaces, London 1965,
- Universal Forces in Mechanics, London 1977
- Grundfragen der Naturwissenschaft, Stuttgart 1979
- Lemniscatory Ruled Surface in Space and Counterspace, Rudolf Steiner Press (March 1979) ISBN 978-0854403486

=== With Olive Whicher ===
- The Living Plant and the Science of Physical and Ethereal Space, Stourbridge 1949;
- The Plant between Sun and Earth, Clent 1952, London 21980;
