= Walter Braithwaite (composer) =

British composer

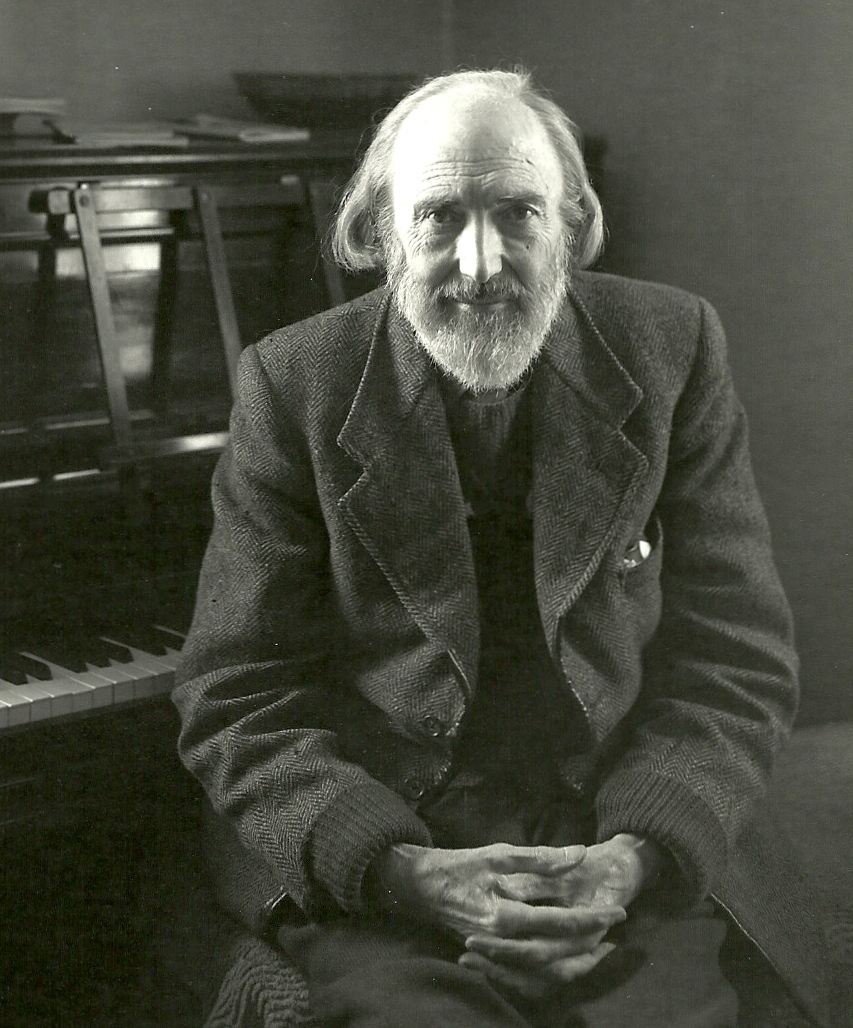
Walter Braithwaite

Walter Heurtley Braithwaite (1906–1991) was a composer, pianist and teacher. He was born in Gloucester on 24 August 1906, the third of five children born to Rev. Herbert Morris Braithwaite (Rector of St. Michael's, Gloucester; a grandson of Anna Braithwaite) and Julia Mary née Young (daughter of Richard Young, bishop of Athabasca). His middle name was after his great grand-uncle Charles Abel Heurtley.

He moved to Worcestershire to work at Sunfield Children's Home where his brother Bellamy was working, and later worked at Elmfield Rudolf Steiner School, Stourbridge. Thus he worked with Fried Geuter, Michael Wilson (incidentally a distant cousin of his), John Kobbe (his brother-in-law) and Eileen Hutchins. He composed songs for school plays and festivals, taught music and piano, and accompanied eurythmy lessons. Works include a Sonata for Violin & Piano; Incidental Music for a production of The Merchant of Venice; Music for the Act of Consecration for Piano or Strings, and many other short pieces and songs, arrangements of carols and folk-songs. He also wrote about music theory, teaching and improvisation. While working at Sunfield, he met Sophy Kathleen Cottrell - they married in 1942 and had two children.

For much of his life Braithwaite lived with his family in Corser Street, Stourbridge. Instruments he owned here included two upright pianos (one of them hand-painted red and blue), a harmonium, and two square pianos, one of which he converted into a clavichord. He was an early member of The Christian Community church in Stourbridge, for which he wrote music and played piano. He died in Clent on 18 August 1991.

In 1970 he published his first Book of Songs, with a foreword written by Yehudi Menuhin. The second Book of Songs appeared in 1978, and a second edition of the first book came out in 1984 to raise money for the new Christian Community chapel in Baylie Street, Stourbridge. Two of the songs in the first book, 'Ut queant laxis' and 'The Spring by the Wayside (Bare is the Rock)', are still regularly sung at Elmfield School assemblies.
