= Ross Rentea =

American physician

Ross Rentea MD has been a practicing family physician in Chicago for over 25 years. He is an author, editor, physician of anthroposophical medicine and innovator.

== Articles ==
- Anthroposophical Aspects of Diabetes Treatment
- Gold, Frankincense and Myrrh- Companions for Overcoming Work-Related Stress?
- Sensory Overload
- The Seven Life Processes
- Spirituality in Substance (I) An Anthroposophical View of Gemstones

== See also ==
- Anthroposophical medicine
- Naturopathy
