= William Randolph Hearst II =

American businessman

- Born: 1942 (age 83–84)
- Education: University of San Francisco
- Occupation: Businessman

William Randolph Hearst II (born 1942) is an American businessman and a member of the Hearst family.

He is the son of business executive John Randolph Hearst and the grandson of publisher William Randolph Hearst.

== Life and career ==
Hearst attended the University of San Francisco, where he studied business. In 1966, he married Jennifer Erica Carolyn Gooch.

During the 1974 kidnapping of his cousin Patty Hearst by the Symbionese Liberation Army, Hearst's roommate was kidnapped and held hostage after being mistaken for Hearst. Hearst was the executive producer of "A Voyage with Shakespeare with Francis Edmunds," a production at Emerson College in East Sussex from 1985 to 1987. As of 1987, Hearst was living in Britain and was a certified Waldorf school teacher.

He has been involved in legal disputes over the Hearst family estate, alongside his cousin Patty Hearst. In 2006, Hearst founded Regenesis Power, a solar energy company.
