= John Davy (journalist) =

British journalist and science editor (1927–1984)

John Charles Davy OBE (8 August 1927 – 28 October 1984) was a British journalist and science editor for The Observer, lecturer, vice-principal of Emerson College and Anthroposophist.

== Biography ==
=== Early life ===
John Davy was born to the journalist couple Charles and Doris Davy in London. He had a younger brother who, as he did, became a journalist. From the early 1930s onwards, both parents were intimately connected to the work of Anthroposophy. Charles Davy wrote a number of books, amongst others The Three Spheres of Society (1946) on Social threefolding, while Doris Davy wrote travelogues and children’s books. Her main interest, however, was in biodynamic farming and she edited the journal of the BD movement, "Star and Furrow", for many years.

The two boys attended Abbotsholme School in N. England, strongly influenced by the pedagogical ideas of Kurt Hahn but John asked to spend his last year of schooling at Michael Hall, in Forest Row. Here he was taught by Cecil Harwood and Francis Edmunds, both of whom remained connected with him in his anthroposophical work for the rest of his life.

His military service he spent in Vienna as a member of the Intelligence Corps from 1945 – 1947, where his main task was the interrogation of refugees. He studied at Cambridge University and immediately thereafter met his future German wife, Gudrun zur Linden, whom he followed to Germany in order to learn German. He worked there as woodsman, taught English at the Waldorf School in Stuttgart and finally obtained a scholarship to study for a year at the University of Freiburg.

=== Science correspondent ===
Quite unexpectedly, he received an offer from The Observer in London to act as their first science editor. Under the chief editorship of David Astor, the paper showed great openness to new socio-political, scientific and ecological ideas. He accepted, married and moved to Forest Row in Sussex, commuting to London every day.

His duties entailed reporting on the newest scientific developments of the 1950s: the computer, the beginnings of space travel, on latest developments in psychological theory, the discovery of the structure of DNA and much more. Through his 16 years with The Observer Davy came to know personally most of the great inventors and discoverers of his time. In acknowledgement for his achievements he received the Order of the British Empire, having contributed greatly to the international recognition of figures like Rachel Carson (Silent Spring), E. F. Schumacher (Small Is Beautiful), Ivan Illich (Deschooling Society), David Bohm and others, drawing attention to many of the dangerous developments of modern civilisation.

In the course of these years, John Davy was often requested to hold lectures and write articles relating to the Anthroposophical work. For professional reasons, he published this work under the pseudonym "John Waterman", adopting the pen name of his father "Charles Waterman".

=== Emerson College ===
In 1962 Francis Edmunds had founded Emerson College in Forest Row, in pursuit of an ideal to bring young people from all over the world together, enabling them to receive a comprehensive training in thought, art and handcrafts on an anthroposophical basis. From the start he had wanted to include John Davy as his co-worker in the project, a position Davy accepted in 1969.

He became assistant-director of the college, with the primary responsibility for development and course of the Foundation Year. His particular fields were the development of scientific method and viewpoint; its strengths and limitations; their relationship to other means of perception, in particular to the work of the artist and thirdly, methods of working together in groups with the aim of deepening our phenomenological understanding of nature.

Besides directing the work of the College, he had become increasingly engaged in the work of the Anthroposophical Society in Great Britain. For many years he had worked together with Cecil Harwood and other British anthroposophists to re-unify the General Anthroposophical Society, from which the British Society had separated in 1935. This was finally achieved in 1963. After Harwood’s death his responsibilities within the leadership of the Society increased greatly. Besides this, he was invited on a large number of lecture tours internationally, particularly to Canada and the USA. Here he paid particular attention to invitations from a large number of universities and other non-anthroposophical institutions where people wanted to hear about Rudolf Steiner, the method and results of his research and its further development.

In April 1984 when he was unexpectedly diagnosed with cancer and died in October of that year.

== Published works ==
- Work Arising from the Life of Rudolf Steiner, Rudolf Steiner Press, London 1975. ISBN 978-0854402946
- Hope, Evolution, Change. Hawthorn Pr (Hawthorn House) 1990. ISBN 978-0950706276
- Matter and Mind - Imaginative participation in Science. Lindisfarne Pr 1991. ISBN 9780940262454
