= D'Herbois =

D'Herbois is a French surname. Notable people with the surname include:

- Jean-Marie Collot d'Herbois (1749–1796), French actor, writer and revolutionary
- Liane Collot d'Herbois (1907–1999), British painter
