= Eileen Hutchins =

Eileen Morley Hutchins (28 June 1902 – 9 October 1987) was a Steiner school teacher, writer and founder of the Elmfield Rudolf Steiner School in Stourbridge.

== Biography ==
Hutchins was born on 28 June 1902 in Hay-on-Wye. Together with her sister Shirley, Eileen Hutchins experienced a strict upbringing. She was a gifted child, beginning to read Scott and Dickens at the early age of 14, but it was seeing her first Shakespeare performance that became, for her, a life-changing experience. It led her to study literature at Oxford University.

Initially she began to teach in Colwyn Bay, then moved to the Leeds High School in the 1920s, where she met Edith Rigby who introduced her to Anthroposophy and to the work of Rudolf Steiner. In November 1930 she joined the Maud Wilson Group of the Anthroposophical Society in Leeds and attended its meetings.

== Elmfield School ==
Meanwhile, her sister Shirley Hutchins had started to work at a home for children with special needs near Birmingham called Sunfield after the original Anthroposophical curative home, the Sonnenhof in Arlesheim, Switzerland. Fried Geuter, the founder of the home heard of Eileen and wrote, asking if she would be willing to come to Sunfield and teach his and the other co-worker children. She began there in 1931 but soon a number of other children joined her and they needed a larger space. It was Lloyd and Theodora Wilson, Fried Geuter's co-founder, Michael Wilson’s parents, who offered the budding school space in their home, Elmfield, in Selly Oak, Birmingham. In 1934 the school joined "The New School" as the second Rudolf Steiner school in Britain. Eileen taught first in the primary school, then later in the high school as the children grew older.

During World War I years it was not possible to keep the school open in Birmingham, so space was made for the children in the village of Clent, to which Sunfield Homes had moved. At the end of the war, Eileen Hutchins’ father bought a house for Elmfield in Park Hill, on the outskirts of Stourbridge, so Eileen was able to re-found the school, now as a day school.

Despite growing blindness and deafness as she grew older, Eileen Hutchins continued to direct the school until 1984 and also played a role within the countrywide Steiner schools movement. She edited its magazine Child and Man from 1968 until 1979 and taught for many years in the teacher training programmes. She wrote poems and plays, commentaries and handbooks on Waldorf education, translated the German poet Novalis and lectured both in the UK and abroad. She died on 9 October 1987 in Stourbridge, at the age of 85.

== Books ==
- Parzival: An Introduction Rudolf Steiner Press; 2nd Revised edition (1 June 2012) ISBN 978-1906999353
- Introduction to the Mystery Plays of Rudolf Steiner Rudolf Steiner Press (1 August 2014) ISBN 978-1855844025
- The Curriculum of the First Waldorf School by Caroline von Heydebrand translated by Eileen Hutchins, Steiner Waldorf Schools Fellowship; 2nd Revised edition (1 January 2010) ISBN 978-0951033135
- Sacred Songs of Novalis Waverley Press (1956) ASIN B004BB137I

== Articles ==
Eileen Hutchins wrote a large number of articles on Steiner education, some of which can be found below

- Teaching of Writing by Eileen Hutchins. The Online Waldorf Library retrieved 2014.09.14
- Articles by Eileen Hutchins in the Waldorf Journal Project, The Online Waldorf Library retrieved 2014.09.14
