= Liane Collot d'Herbois =

British painter (1907–1999)

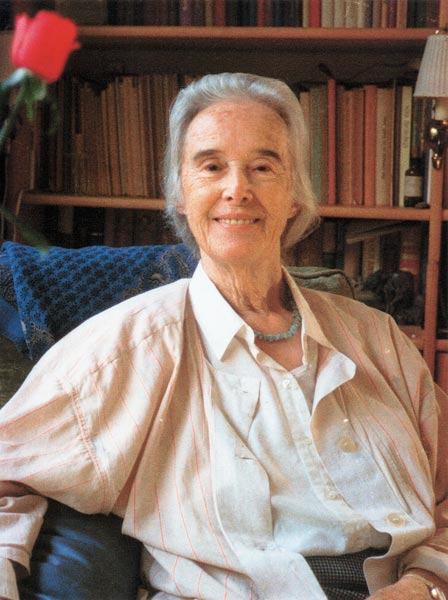
Liane Collot d'Herbois

Liane Collot d'Herbois (English: /kɒˈloʊ/ ko-LOH, French: [ljan kɔlo dɛʁbwa]; 17 December 1907 – 17 September 1999) was a British painter and anthroposophical painting therapist. She researched light, dark, colour and their application in painting and therapy.

== Biography ==
Liane Collot d'Herbois was born on 17 December 1907 in Camelford, England. She grew up near Tintagel, the only child of a French painter father, René Philippe Marie, from Besançon, and a Scottish mother, Elizabeth. The child spent most of her time with her grandmother and is said to have remained fearful of her tempestuous father. In 1912 the family moved to Western Australia. After only one year, Liane and her mother returned to England, while the father remained in Australia and went on to develop a career as a painter and art teacher. She would never see her father again. The parents divorced and they each re-married. Liane inherited her father's gift for drawing and was already selling pictures at the age of eleven. Her encounter with Buddhism and somewhat later, the writings of Plato brought a certain calm to her fiery temperament.

She attended the Birmingham Academy of Arts painting school and discovered the book Knowledge of the Higher Worlds by Rudolf Steiner in the library there. At the age of 20 she received her art teaching diploma, and at the same time a bursary for further study at the British Museum in London.

Her wish was to work with troubled and handicapped children, whose drawings and paintings she felt able to interpret. After giving a presentation on Buddhism at the university, a priest of the Christian Community made her aware of anthroposophy. She went to Stourbridge in 1927, to the Sunfield Homes in Clent, Worcestershire, joining their staff and staying for the next seven years.

At Sunfield her paintings drew the attention of Dra Ita Wegman, a medical co-worker of Rudolf Steiner, and wrote to her encouraging her to continue with painting and inviting her to visit Arlesheim. There she was requested to try and paint healing pictures as therapeutic art. Ita Wegman conveyed the opinion that the most important thing for an artist is not self-expression but to create works for other people. Swayed by Wegman, Liane only seldom signed her works, diverting herself instead to observe things "deeply", painting them “from the heart”, as she said. For some time she stayed at the Casa Andrea Cristoforo in Ascona, then followed Ita Wegman to Paris and returned once again to Arlesheim in 1940. Working together with Wegman, Hilma Walter and Margarethe Hauschka, Liane developed an original painting therapy for patients with a variety of ailments. The frescos in the “La Motta” chapel in Brissago, where the urn of Wegman's ashes was placed, are by Collot d'Herbois.

Collot d'Herbois died on 17 September 1999 in Driebergen, the Netherlands.

== Work ==
After 1946 she travelled with the painter and sculptor Francine van Davelaar through Europe and North America, working and teaching. Finally both women settled in the Netherlands where they were joined by a group of painting students calling themselves the “Magenta Group” from 1967 to 1987.

Collot developed a painting technique consisting of up to 80 different layers of colour, based on Rudolf Steiner's Philosophy of Freedom, which she outlined in her textbooks, Colour I and Colour II. In 1978 she was invited by Dr Paulo Walburgh-Schmidt to instruct therapists in painting and also resumed work directly with patients. She achieved recognition among doctors, therapists and patients, with her humour and energy and her fluency in English, German, French and Dutch.

Exhibitions of her work took place in Colmar in 1975, regularly at the Goetheanum in Dornach, Switzerland and after her death at the Husemann Clinic in Buchenbach, Germany. Her many paintings, include altarpieces for the Christian Community, meditative pictures in clinics and pieces bought by private collectors throughout the world.

== Published work ==
- Colour: A Textbook for Anthroposophical Painting Groups Floris Books (2006) ISBN 978-0863156250
- Light, Darkness and Colour in Painting Therapy Floris Books; 2nd edition (2000) ISBN 978-0863153273
