= Union for Ethical Biotrade =

Netherlands-based nonprofit organization

UEBT
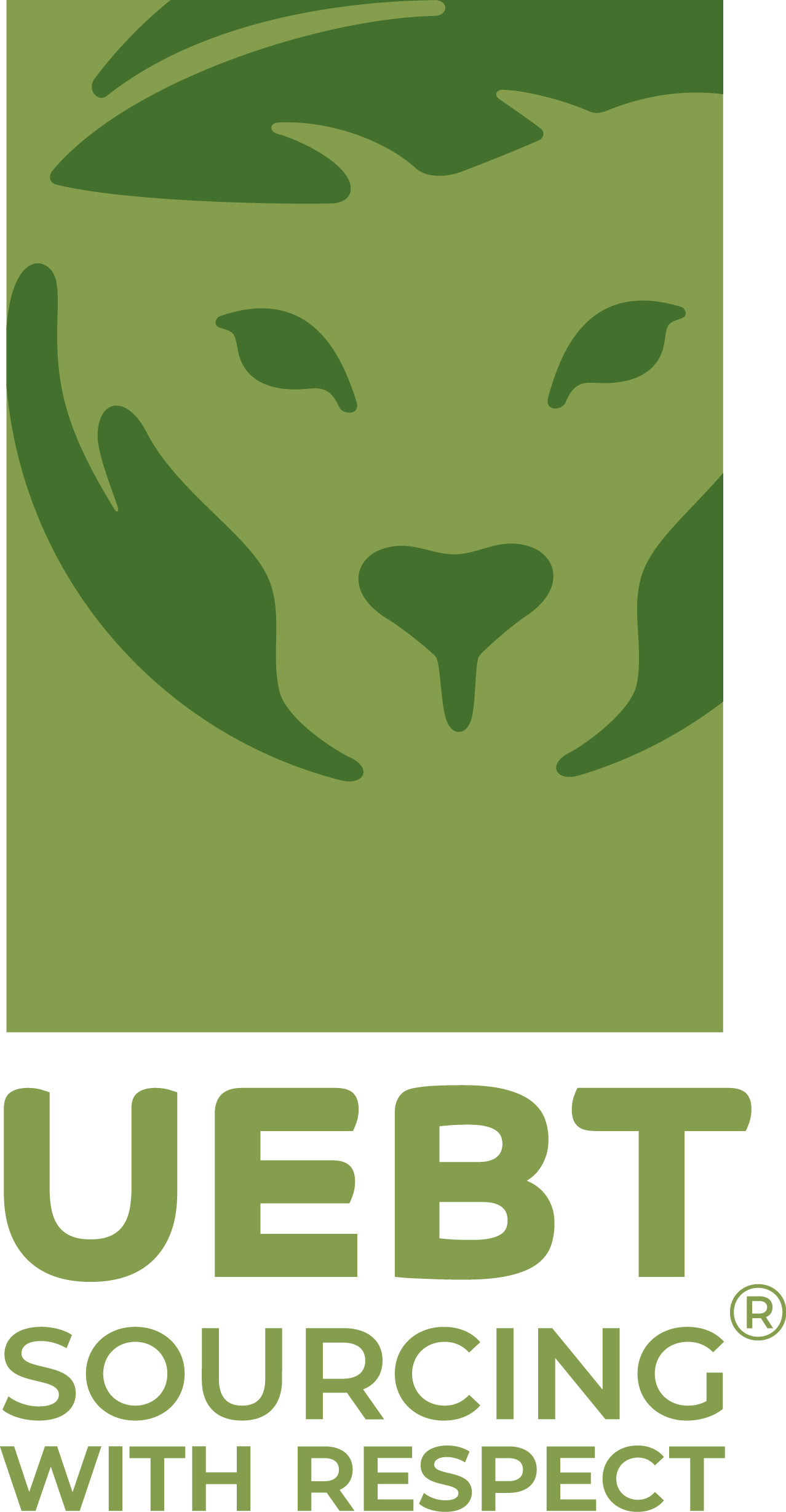
- UEBT logo
- Formation: 2007
- Type: nonprofit association
- Purpose: promoting the "Sourcing with Respect" of ingredients that come from biodiversity
- Headquarters: Amsterdam
- Website: uebt.org

UEBT - Sourcing with Respect is a nonprofit association that promotes the "Sourcing with Respect" of ingredients that come from biodiversity. Members commit to gradually ensuring that their sourcing practices promote the conservation of biodiversity, respect traditional knowledge and assure the equitable sharing of benefits all along the supply chain, following the Ethical BioTrade Standard. Members also commit to the UEBT verification system, which includes undergoing independent third party verification against the Ethical BioTrade Standard, developing a work-plan for gradual compliance for all natural, as well as the commitment to continuous improvement once compliance is achieved.

== History ==
UEBT is a membership-based organisation that was created in May 2007 in Geneva, Switzerland. It was conceptualized in response to multiple developments. First of all, the Convention on Biological Diversity (CBD) acknowledged that additional efforts were needed to reach out to the private sector. The CBD recognized the strong link between business and biodiversity, as well as the dependency of industry on biodiversity and it highlighted the key role the private sector plays in sustainable use and the need for efforts and tools to engage it. In pursuit of the decisions that CBD parties had taken regarding private sector engagement and the use of standards in this, the idea of UEBT was conceived. The creation of UEBT also responded to the need expressed by small and medium-sized enterprises (SMEs) in developing countries for ways to differentiate biodiversity-based products in the market. Finally, UEBT built upon efforts initiated by the BioTrade Initiative of the United Nations Conference on Trade and Development (UNCTAD), which was created to contribute to making biodiversity a strategy for sustainable development.

On 8 May 2007, a meeting of the founding members took place and the articles of association were approved. To support the efforts of the Union, the CBD and UEBT signed a Memorandum of Understanding in December 2008, to encourage companies involved in BioTrade to adopt and promote good practices.

== Aim ==
Although the CBD and CSD provide general principles, not much practical guidance is currently available to help businesses advance on the ethical sourcing of biodiversity. UEBT fills this gap and makes concrete contributions to biodiversity conservation and local sustainable development. UEBT aims to bring together actors committed to Ethical BioTrade, and promotes, facilitates and recognises ethical sourcing of biodiversity in line with the objectives of the CBD.

In order to achieve these goals, UEBT supports its members in the membership process and in their work towards implementing the Ethical BioTrade Standard. It also provides technical support, organizes regular conferences and workshops around Access and Benefit Sharing and biodiversity, publishes papers and reports, and consults organisations on the ethical sourcing from biodiversity.

== Standard ==
UEBT manages the Ethical BioTrade Standard, which provides a basis for UEBT Trading Members to improve their biodiversity sourcing practices. UEBT members develop biodiversity management systems that further the implementation of the Ethical BioTrade Standard in all their own operations involving natural ingredients, as well as throughout their supply chains.

In joining UEBT, a company agrees to comply with the principles of Ethical BioTrade. This means using practices that promote the sustainable use of natural ingredients, while ensuring that all contributors along the supply chain are paid fair prices and share the benefits derived from the use of biodiversity. The Ethical BioTrade Standard is mainstreamed in the operations of UEBT trading members, including for instance in research, innovation and development.

UEBT members undergo regular audits by independent third party verification bodies. UEBT works with the following Verification Bodies: Imaflora, SGS Qualifor, NaturaCert, Control Union Certifications, Ecocert SA, SGS del Peru S.A.C., Soil Association, IBD Certificações (IBD), Biotropico S.A., IMO do Brasil, and Rainforest Alliance.

The Ethical BioTrade Standard builds on the seven Principles and Criteria as developed by the UNCTAD BioTrade Initiative. First established in 2007, it was revised in April 2011, following the requirements of the ISEAL Alliance and the World Trade Organization (WTO). These requirements include the need to periodically review the Standard and ensure wide stakeholder involvement during the review process.

== Biodiversity Barometer ==
Every year the UEBT publishes the Biodiversity Barometer. The Biodiversity Barometer contains the results of awareness studies commissioned by UEBT and provides insights on evolving biodiversity awareness among consumers and how the beauty industry reports on biodiversity. The Barometer is used as one of the indicators for measuring progress towards meeting the Aichi Biodiversity Target 1 in the Biodiversity Indicators Partnership's Aichi Passport.

== Members ==
UEBT has several types of trading members: brands, producers and processing companies, mainly in the global cosmetics, pharmaceutical and food sector. Current UEBT trading members include Natura, Weleda, Laboratoires Expanscience and Aroma Forest. UEBT also has affiliate members, which currently include the International Finance Corporation (IFC), MEB - Movimento Empresarial Brasileiro pela Biodiversidade, PhytoTrade Africa and Rongead.

== Funding ==
UEBT is financed by membership fees and contributions from donors.

== Governance ==
The General Assembly acts as the main governing body of UEBT and meets once a year to elect the Members of the Board. The General Assembly is composed of all UEBT Members. Provisional, Trading and Affiliate Members have the right to vote and elect the Board of Directors, thereby approving the management of the organization. UNCTAD, the CBD and the International Finance Corporation act as observers to the Board. To support the functioning of UEBT, the Board has appointed various committees, including an appeals committee, a membership committee, and a standards committee.
