= George Holmes (bishop) =

English-born Anglican bishop

George Holmes was an English-born Anglican bishop in Canada from 1905 to 1912.

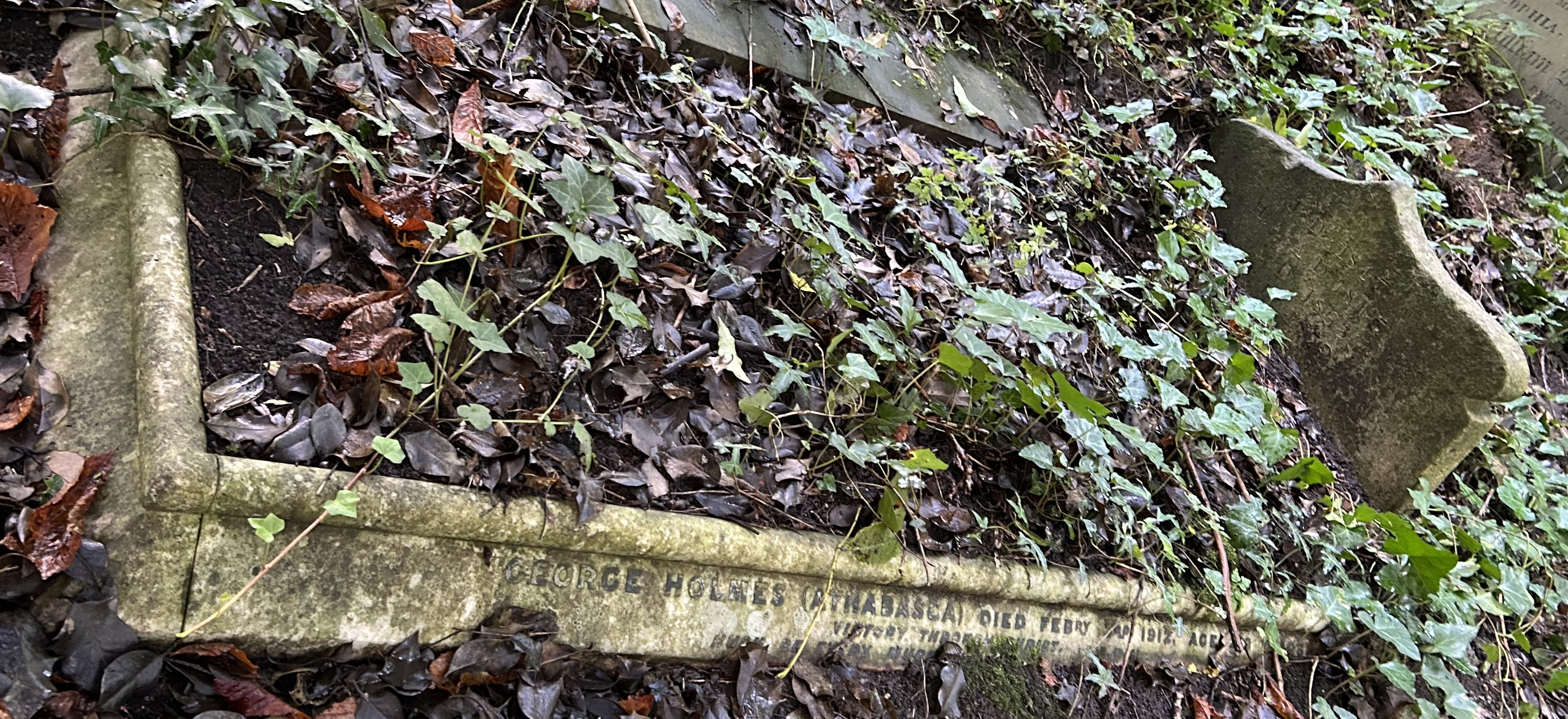
Grave of George Holmes in Highgate Cemetery

Holmes was born in Kendal, Westmorland on 23 November 1858 and ordained in 1887 after which he was a Church Mission Society (CMS) missionary in the Northwest Territories. In 1901 he became Archdeacon of Athabasca and four years later was ordained to the episcopate as the Bishop of Moosonoe. He was translated to the Diocese of Athabasca in 1909. He died on 3 February 1912 and was buried at Highgate Cemetery.

Anglican Communion titles
Preceded by Jervois Arthur Newnham	Bishop of Moosonee; 1905–1909	Succeeded by John George Anderson
Preceded by Richard Young	Bishop of Athabasca; 1909–1912	Succeeded by Edwin Frederick Robins
