= Edwin Robins =

Anglican bishop (1870–1951)

Edwin Frederick Robins (11 February 1870 – 22 March 1951) was an Anglican bishop in Canada from 1912 to 1930.

== Biography ==
He was born in London on 11 February 1870 and ordained deacon in 1894 after which he was a CMS missionary in Dera Ghazi Khan. In 1897 he was ordained Priest and became Curate of St James, Paddington. After a similar post at St Thomas à Becket Widcombe he was Vicar of Thorpe-le-Soken for eight years. In 1909 he was appointed Archdeacon of Athabasca and after three years its diocesan bishop (Bishop of Athabasca), holding the post until 1930. On his return to England in 1931, he was Vicar of Wicklewood until 1947 and Assistant Bishop of Norwich until his death on 22 March 1951. He had become a Doctor of Divinity (DD).

Anglican Communion titles
Preceded by George Holmes	Bishop of Athabasca; 1912–1930	Succeeded by Robert Renison
