= Fried Geuter =

Carl Friedrich Wilhelm "Fried" Geuter (born 27 June 1892 in Darmstadt, Germany, and died on 14 February 1960 in Ravenswood, United Kingdom), was a pioneer of anthroposophical Special Needs education, the co-founder of Sunfield Children's Home and teacher at the Ravenswood Village Settlement near Crowthorne in Berkshire.

== Biography ==
Fried Geuter was born to a Johann Peter Wilhelm Geuter and Bertha Victoria Ollendorff, a Frankfurt merchant family with international connections that acquainted him with England and its culture from an early age. Beyond this, nothing is known of his childhood and youth until he began studying for a career in commerce, but was at once called up for military service in World War I. Although in his youth – after he had allegedly caused a friend to lose an eye through playing around with a gun – he had sworn never to carry one again, he knew he had to do military service. In 1918 he met and married Maria Fuchs, an Austrian nursing sister based at the garrison in Meschede where he was stationed. The couple later had a son and two daughters.

It was in that same year that he met Herbert Hahn, also in Meschede where Hahn was engaged as translator in the garrison and had a small group that would gather to read fundamental works of Rudolf Steiner in his army hut. They got into a conversation on Christmas Eve that lasted all night – one so lively that Hahn reports that they went to the early morning service refreshed, though the candles had burnt down long before. It appears that conversations like this were part of Fried’s make-up, as if he were possessed by the "Genius of Conversation".

Together the friends of Hahn’s circle began also to study the texts on Social threefolding that were being sent out from Stuttgart, hearing names like Emil Molt, Professor Wilhelm von Blume or Carl Unger for the first time. Immediately after the war, Herbert Hahn and Fried Geuter began to take on work in Stuttgart for the movement and soon afterwards Fried was engaged for the business venture "Kommenden Tag".

In 1920 he toured from one city to the other in Germany, organising lecture tours for Walter Johannes Stein and Herbert Hahn when, after a short but severe illness he suddenly came to the realisation that he wanted to become an educator for Special Needs. The decision changed the course of his further life, he moved to the Sonnenhof in Arlesheim, Switzerland and worked under the guidance of Ita Wegman, who inspired him with her insights into the needs and methods adopted in caring and educating children with mental handicap. He worked there until 1929 when, encouraged by Ita Wegman, he moved to England to help establish the Special Needs work there.

He had got to know England well as a child due to his family’s business interests there and had complete mastery of the language. At first he worked at a children’s home in Kent connected to the work of Ita Wegman. Then he was invited by Mrs Lloyd Wilson to lecture to her anthroposophical group in Selly Oak, Birmingham. After the lecture he met her son, Michael Wilson, at the time a successful musician and conductor. The two had a conversation that led to Michael Wilson stating his wish to join him in his work.

== Sunfield Children's Homes ==
As Fried became increasingly disillusioned with the way things were done at the home in Kent, he and Michael Wilson decided to leave and founded Sunfield Children’s Home in the village of Clent. From the start, he engaged all co-workers in a communal study of Rudolf Steiner’s Philosophy of Freedom. This common struggle with the basics of human knowledge and culture gave depth and character to the whole venture and Sunfield became a centre for anthroposophical youth work in England with an enormous variety of cultural events and warm mood amongst the members of the community.

== Ravenswood ==
In 1951 he left his wife and Sunfield homes, married for the second time to Isabel Newitt and lived for some time in Switzerland, lecturing. Then, in 1953 he was requested to run an anthroposophically-oriented home for Special Needs children of orthodox Jewish parentage in Ravenswood by Crowthorne. He agreed on the condition that the co-workers of the institution would be permitted to run their lives in its daily and annual rhythms in the manner that corresponded to the basic requirements of the anthroposophical curative movement. On the other hand, the ritual habits and practices of the Jewish children should in no way be affected. The attitude and manner in which Fried Geuter was able to place this work in a broad cultural context received wide acclaim from official circles for the anthroposophical Special Needs work.

On 14 February 1960 Fried Geuter died of heart failure at Ravenswood.

"He had the strong conviction that if one simply permitted one’s heart to look and listen to everything that the events of daily life wish to tell us, it becomes unnecessary to worry about the future, because the ways and means will always be found to master the tasks."
