= Weleda =

Alternative medicine and beauty products company

Weleda AG
- ISIN: CH0004960180
- Industry: Cosmetics
- Founded: 1921
- Headquarters: Arlesheim (Basel-Landschaft), Switzerland
- Key people: Aldo Ammendola (CRDO), Michael Brenner (CFO), Alois Mayer (COO), Nataliya Yarmolenko (CCO), Paul Mackay (President of the BOD)
- Products: anthroposophical medicine; naturopathic medicine; beauty products
- Revenue: 424,059,000 EUR (2020)
- Operating income: 22,317,000 (2020)
- Total assets: 284,824,000 (2020)
- Number of employees: 2,512 (2020)
- Website: www.weleda.com

Weleda is a multinational company that produces both beauty products and naturopathic medicines. Both branches design their products based on anthroposophic principles, an alternative medicine.

The company takes its name from the German form of the name of the 1st-century Bructeri völva Veleda. As well as being known to use green energy, Weleda uses natural ingredients grown using biodynamic methods and none of their ingredients or products are tested on animals.

Weleda Group is member of the Union for Ethical Biotrade (UEBT).

== History ==
=== 1920–24: Founding and early history ===
In 1920, Rudolf Steiner, an Austrian philosopher, and Ita Wegman, a Dutch gynecologist founded "Futurum AG", in Arlesheim, Switzerland, and "Der Kommende Tag AG" (an incorporated company with the mission of encouraging economic and spiritual values) in Stuttgart, Germany. Their operating profits were meant to contribute to the financing of various anthroposophic undertakings such as constructing the Goetheanum and establishing the Free Waldorf School in Stuttgart. In 1920, Der Kommende Tag AG acquired the former "Colonial-Werke Paul Rumpus" in Schwäbisch Gmünd. Today, this is the location of the Weleda headquarters. In 1921, the two companies wanted to merge for financial reasons. In 1922, the Futurum AG was renamed Internationale Laboratorien AG (ILAG) and new shares were issued. At a general meeting, Rudolf Steiner asked the shareholders to give their shares in Der Kommende Tag to ILAG in order to secure the assets of both companies, which were in financial difficulties. The companies were merged under a new name: Internationale Laboratorien und Klinisch-Therapeutisches Institut Arlesheim A.G. The facilities in Germany became branches of the Swiss parent company. Following a suggestion by Rudolf Steiner, the name Weleda was registered as a trademark: on September 20, 1924, in Germany and on September 25, 1924, in Switzerland. It was also proposed to rename ILAG, the parent company accordingly. On 10 December 1928, the company officially registered under the new name Weleda AG, and it is still known as such today. The name Weleda derives from the Germanic prophet and healer „Veleda“. The Weleda company logo was designed by Rudolf Steiner. The logo is based on the Rod of Asclepius, a staff entwined with a snake, which is a symbol of the medical and pharmaceutical professions.

The establishment of Weleda coincided with Lebensreform, "life reform", a social movement in Germany that advocated alternative medicine and health food.

=== From 1925: Internationalisation ===
During the 1920s, Weleda expanded its product range. Some of the newly developed cosmetics are still part of the range today: toiletry milk (later iris milk), massage oil, rosemary bath, skin cream, soap, shaving soap, skin food, sun protection cream, hair washing powder, pine bath essence, and arnica essence. Weleda's total turnover doubled between 1925 and 1928 and Weleda expanded internationally. A number of subsidiaries are founded in the 1920s: The British Weleda Co. Ltd. (1924), Handelsonderneming Weleda (Netherlands, 1926), The American Arlesheim Laboratories (1926), Veleda-Ges.m.b.H. (Czechoslovakia, 1926).

=== From 1933: Nazi Germany ===
During the 1930s, parts of the Nazi Party (NSDAP) viewed anthroposophy as a movement that was contrary to National Socialism. As a consequence, Rudolf Steiner's books were banned from Bavarian public libraries. In 1935, the Anthroposophical Society was proscribed. Several times, Weleda was threatened with a ban on production, which it could avoid with considerable effort. In 1943, Weleda delivered a one-off consignment of frostbite protection cream to the German armed forces, the Wehrmacht. Since Weleda did not have the petroleum jelly needed to produce the frostbite protection cream that had been ordered, it was provided with this ingredient from the Wehrmacht's own stock. The frostbite protection cream was delivered to Staff Surgeon Sigmund Rascher of the German air force. Rascher performed hypothermia experiments on prisoners at Dachau concentration camp. In the 1990s, Weleda distanced itself from these actions and apologized to the survivors’ association Aktion Kinder des Holocaust (AKdH). Weleda facilitated a comprehensive scholarly investigation of the events concerned, carried out by the history department of the University of Basel. Weleda overcame the period of National Socialist rule and the Second World War relatively unscathed, as the German branches belonged to a company with its headquarters in neutral Switzerland.

=== From 1945: Later developments ===
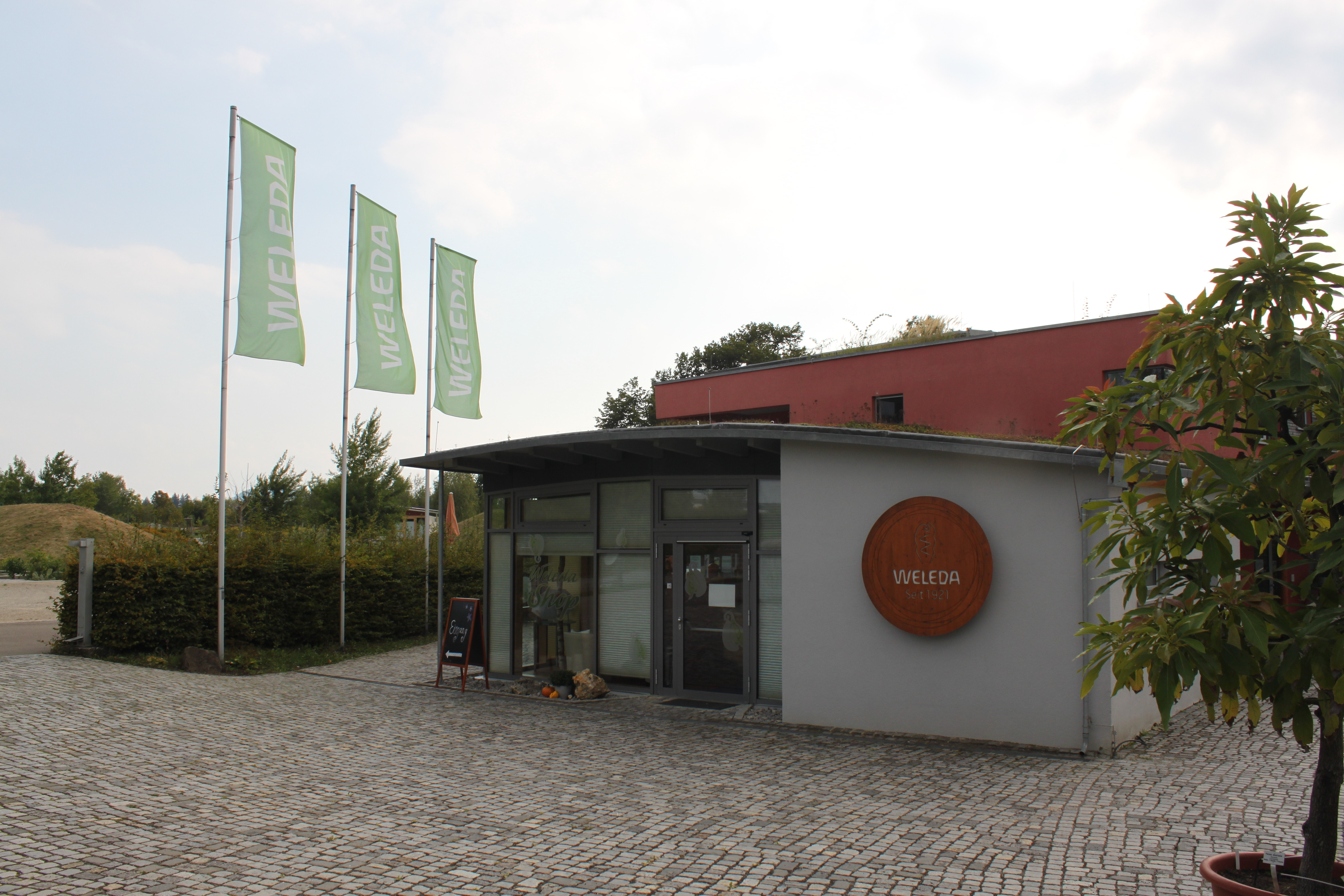
Experience Centre Weleda Schwaebisch Gmuend Visitor Centre with shop

During Europe's economic boom in the 1950s and 1960s, Weleda expanded its product range: therapeutic tea (1950), sea buckthorn elixir (1955), facial toner (1959), shaving cream (1960), lavender bath milk (1961), foot balm (1962), and chestnut shampoo (1966). From the 1950s onwards, Weleda continued to pursue an international course. Foreign subsidiaries were established in Italy (1953), New Zealand (1955), Sweden (1956), Brazil (1959), and Argentina (1965). The global demand for natural cosmetics increased continually during the 1990s and thereafter. By 1992, Weleda was represented in 30 countries with a range of over 10,000 products. Weleda established further international subsidiaries, such as Weleda Chile (1992), Weleda Peru (1993), Weleda Japan (1999), Weleda Slovakia (2000), and Weleda Finland (2004). At the end of 2018, Weleda opened City Spas in the Dutch cities of The Hague, Rotterdam and Oegstgeest. At the beginning of 2020, another City Spa opened in Hamburg. In 2021, two more City Spas opened in Amsterdam and Stuttgart.

=== 2021: 100 years Weleda ===
In 2021, the company turned 100 and marked this event with a partnership with the British charity treesisters to support reforestation projects worldwide. Weleda aims to plant one million trees with this project sponsoring global reforestation projects and initiatives run by women or supporting women. The project started with a Christmas gift sale in 2020 that funded 47,255 trees. Until today 78,355 trees have been planted.

== Anthroposophic philosophy and biodynamics ==
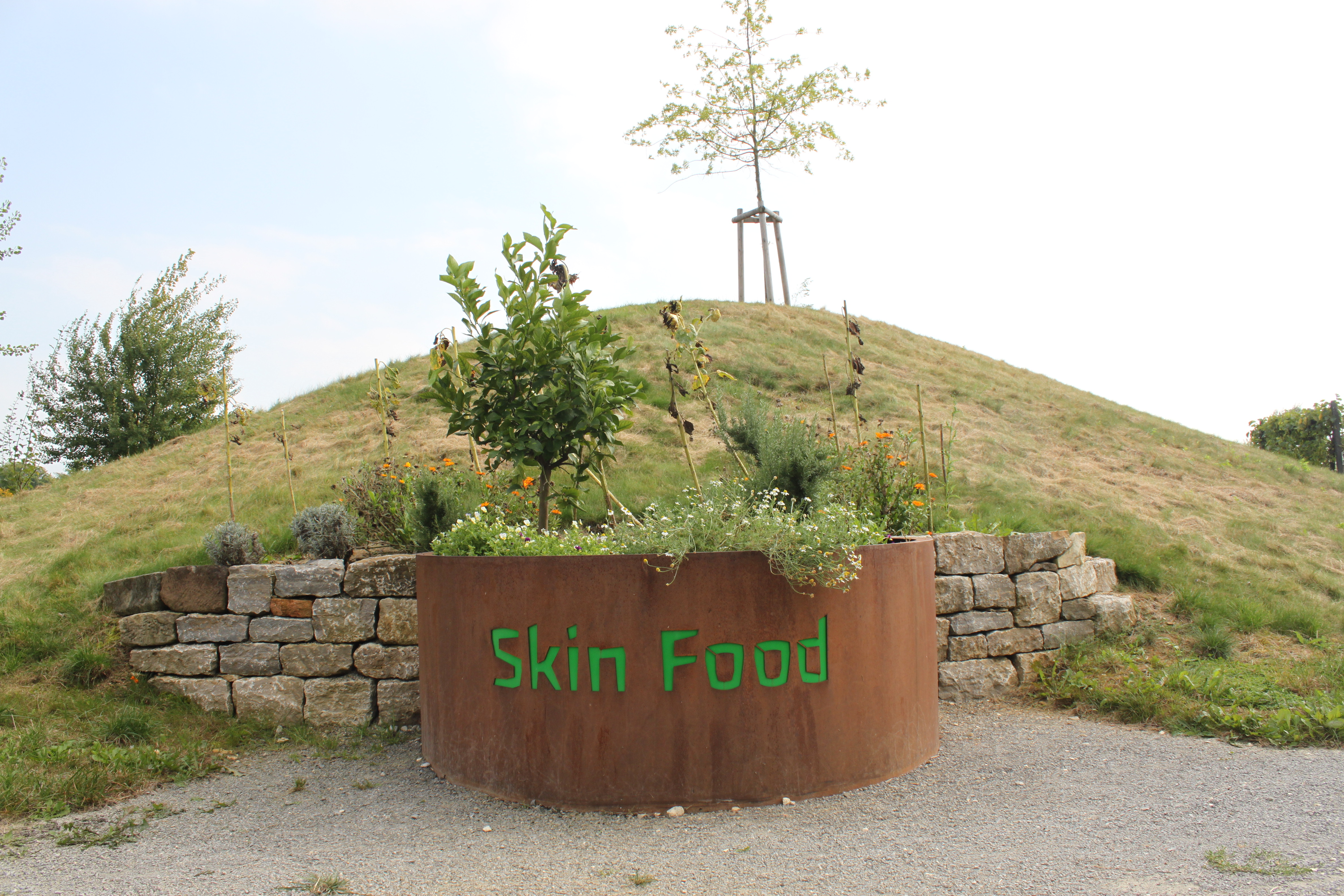
Experience Centre Weleda Schwaebisch Gmuend skin food flower pot

Weleda bases its products on Holistic medicine and Anthroposophic medicine. Anthroposophic medicine is a pseudoscience inspired by the philosophy called Anthroposophy.

Weleda's botanical ingredients are grown using a farming method known as biodynamics. Biodynamic farming was developed by one of Weleda's founders, Rudolf Steiner in 1924. Biodynamics treats the whole farm as one living ecosystem with soil fertility, plant growth and livestock care as ecologically interrelated tasks.

== Products ==
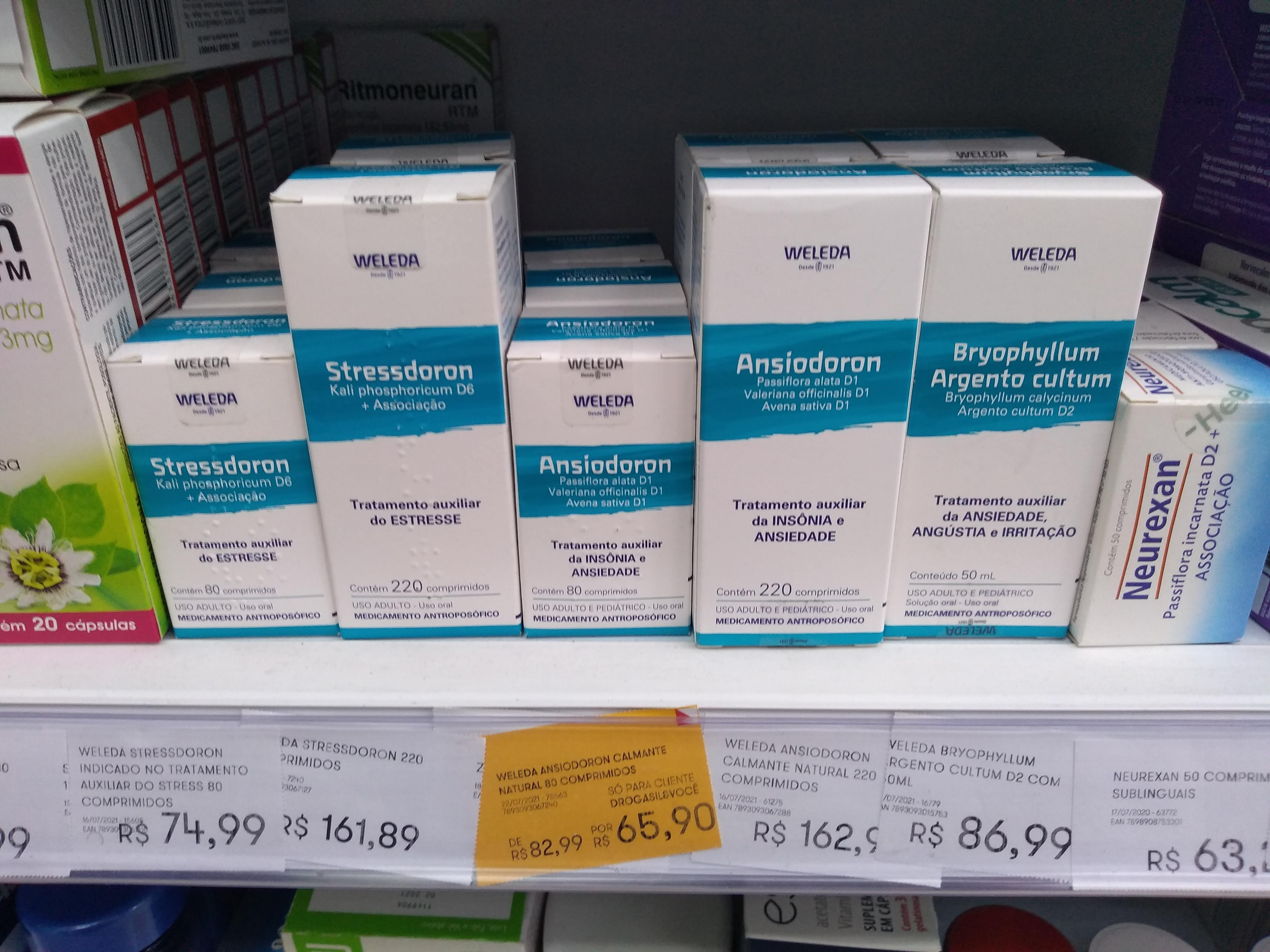
Products sold by Weleda in Brazil, 2021

Weleda is world's leading manufacturer of holistic, natural, organic cosmetics and pharmaceuticals for anthroposophic therapy. The product catalogue includes a complete line of skin care products, like Weleda Skin Food, items for baby and mother care, as well as homeopathic preparations. Following the philosophy of so-called lead plants, the company develops products that do not only focus on the raw materials, as all ingredients and the entire formula contribute to the overall effect. Lead plants include arnica, birch, calendula, iris, lavender and wild rose.

Weleda is known as the historical and main producer of fermented white mistletoe extract (Viscum album), marketed under the name of Iscador. This treatment stems from a 1917 Steiner vision: «According to Rudolf Steiner, it is only through the appropriate blend of mistletoe summer and winter extracts that the mistletoe can deploy its "real healing power" on cancer». Sold as an anti-tumor, and widely used in the 1980s to treat different cancers in Switzerland and Germany (centers of Anthroposophic doctrine), its ineffectiveness has since been established and its use is not recommended by the Swiss Cancer Congress and the Swiss cancer league.

== Sustainability ==
=== Sustainable agriculture ===
Weleda releases an annual sustainability report. Weleda has created several gardens to grow ingredients for its products according to biodynamic cultivation methods that involve sustainable farming, avoiding pesticides and working with the seasons. Following the concept of lead plants, various medicinal plants are cultivated in the gardens, such as calendula, valerian, lavender and sage.

=== Waste prevention and recycling ===
Weleda Benelux has been climate-neutral for several years. The companies in the Netherlands and Belgium have also been participating in a Soil & More Impacts project in 2008 and the Dutch company organizes composting operations worldwide. Weleda partnered with TerraCycle, a waste management company, to bring customers to recycle their packaging. Consumers can send in their empty packaging from the entire Skin Food line of products to be recycled for free. The collected packaging is cleaned and melted into hard plastic used to make new recycled products.

=== Environmental projects ===
Weleda Australia and the Kitchen Garden Foundation have formed a partnership to educate children about the important role of pollinators by building a network of ‚Bee B&B Hotels‘ at primary schools. In 2019, Weleda partnered with Borneo Orangutan Survival (BOS) to protect orangutans and committing to sourcing sustainable palm oil. Weleda has pledged $100,000 to the 20-month project that aims to create harmony between nature conservation and human needs in the Mawas area.

In 2018, Weleda received the first-ever Union for Ethical Biotrade (UEBT) Certification and label for sourcing with respect. The UEBT certification is designed to show consumers that the product they want to buy is produced by a company that treats people and biodiversity with respect.

== Awards ==
Weleda won the first prize at the 2021 Sustainable Beauty Awards by Ecovia in the categories "Sustainable Leadership" and "Sustainable Pioneer".
