= Richard Young (bishop of Athabasca) =

Bishop of Athabasca (1843–1905)

- Bishop of Athabasca
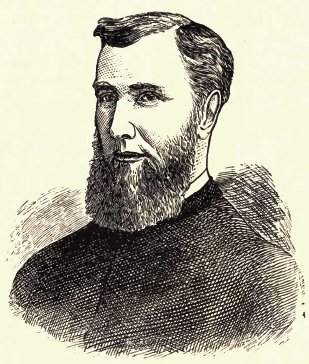
- Church: Church of England
- Diocese: Athabasca
- Installed: 1883
- Term ended: 1903
- Predecessor: William Bompas
- Successor: George Holmes

Personal details
- Born: September 7, 1843 baptized in Sculcoates, England
- Died: July 12, 1905 (aged 61) Southborough, Kent, England
- Denomination: Anglican
- Parents: Anthony William Young
- Spouse: Julia Heurtley Harrison
- Children: Juliet Mary, Arthur William, Walter, Eirene Isabel, Richard Frank Welfitt Young
- Occupation: Anglican missionary and Bishop
- Education: Louth Grammar School
- Alma mater: Clare College, Cambridge

Richard Young (September 7, 1843 – July 12, 1905) was a bishop in Rupert's Land. Young was born and educated in England. After being ordained as a priest in the Church of England in 1869, Young moved with his wife Julia Heurtley Harrison (1844-1934) to Winnipeg, Manitoba in 1875, where they started a family. In 1883 he became bishop of the see of Athabasca in present-day northern Alberta, the first Anglican bishop to be consecrated in western Canada. In 1903 he resigned as bishop due to ill health and returned to England, where he lived until his death in 1905.

One of his sons was Lieutenant Walter Young, a former pupil at Monkton Combe School, who was killed on 30 May 1908 in the Mohmand Expedition on the North West Frontier.

Through his daughter Juliet Mary, Richard Young was the grandfather of the composer Walter Heurtley Braithwaite.
