= Laboratoires Expanscience =

French pharmaceutical company

- Type: Société par actions simplifiée with Management Board and Supervisory Board
- Industry: Pharmaceutical industry, Cosmetics
- Founded: 1950
- Founder: Paul Berthomé and a pharmacist
- Headquarters: Paris La Défense, France
- Key people: Jean-Paul Berthomé President and Sophie Robert-Velut, CEO
- Products: Medicines, Dermocosmetics, Health products
- Revenue: 364,2 million Euros in 2025
- Number of employees: 1330 in 2025
- Website: www.expanscience.com/en

Laboratoires Expanscience was created in 1950 by Paul Berthomé and a pharmacist and is a pharmaceutical laboratory specializing in dermocosmetics, rheumatology, dermatology and the marketing of active cosmetic ingredients. It owns a well known brand Mustela.

== History ==
In 1950, Laboratoires Expanscience was created by Paul Berthomé and a pharmacist and specialized in dermocosmetics.

From 1957, Expanscience decided to diversify into rheumatology.

Laboratoires Expanscience began to develop the international side of its business from 1963 with the opening of a Belgian subsidiary.

Between 1963 and 1996, Laboratoires Expanscience increased its international presence with the opening of 5 subsidiaries in Italy (1965), Spain (1971), Portugal (1979) and the United States (1989).

In 1996, Laboratoires Expanscience once again diversified its business with the introduction of a range of dermatological medicines, followed in 2001 by the launch of its dental health business.

In 2002, the business continued its international expansion with the opening of a subsidiary in Mexico, followed in 2009 by one in Poland and in 2013 with the opening of 2 subsidiaries in Brazil and Turkey then, in 2014 in Australia, in 2015 in Russia and Canada, and in 2017, in China and Hong-Kong.

In April 2018, Laboratoires Expanscience became a "B Corp", an international certification granted to corporations committed to the common good.

== The Expanscience Brands ==
=== Mustela ===
Mustela is a line of products for baby care. The product line includes the following ranges: Mustela Baby - Child Normal Skin, Mustela Baby - Child Dry Skin, Mustela Baby - Child Very Sensitive Skin, Mustela Baby - Child Atopic-Prone Skin, Mustela Specific Care, Mustela Sun Protection, Mustela Maternity.

The name Mustela means 'weasel' in Latin.

=== Other products and brands ===
In addition to these brands Laboratoires Expanscience market the following products:

Rheumatology	Dermatology
Hyalexo	Effizinc
Piasclédine 300	Procuta

== Research and development ==
Laboratoires Expanscience has devoted part of its business to research and development.

In 2025, Laboratoires Expanscience invested 2.4% of its turnover in research and development. Between 1997 and 2025, Laboratoires Expanscience has filed 102 patents in France, 1114 patents worldwide and produced 68 scientific publications.

Laboratoires Expanscience research work is carried out in three centers at its Épernon site:

- The innovation centre which works on the development of new active ingredients based on plant material or derived from green chemistry
- The product development center, which works on the development of new cosmetic products
- The safety, quality and effectiveness center which ensures the quality and chemical safety of the products and materials

== Sustainable development ==
Laboratoires Expanscience initiated a sustainable development strategy in February 2004 with the signature of the United Nations Global Compact.

From 2004, Laboratoires Expanscience has set up a Corporate Social Responsibility framework to incorporate sustainable development into its corporate strategy.

Its action on sustainable development is carried out in 4 areas of work:

- The products - by offering products and active ingredients which are safe for consumers and kind to the environment, and overall reducing their environmental impact
- Purchasing and supplies -by integrating the sustainable development criteria into the purchasing process and by ensuring that biodiversity and local populations are respected and by fighting against bio piracy
- Environmental practices – by working to reduce its environmental impact, in particular by the reduction of water and energy consumption
- Social responsibility – by improving quality of life at work for employees and favoring social investment and dialogue with all its stakeholders

In December 2011, Laboratoires Expanscience joined the Union for Ethical BioTrade (UEBT), ensuring that its sourcing practices promote the conservation of biodiversity, respect traditional knowledge and assure the equitable sharing of benefits all along the supply chain.

Furthermore, Laboratoires Expanscience has set up an environmental management system aiming to get an ISO 14001 certification for 2012 for its production site.

In April 2018, Laboratoires Expanscience became a "B Corp", an international certification granted to corporations committed to the common good.

== The Mustela Foundation ==
Founded in 1982 by the father of the current President of Laboratoires Expanscience under the aegis of the Fondation de France, the Mustela Foundation is aimed at child health professionals and its objective is to promote research and other projects on child development and parenting worldwide.

Since its creation, the Mustela Foundation has supported research by awarding scientific research grants and since 2007 via the Research-Action prize which finances a project led by practicians on the ground and/or researchers working on a topic set out by the scientific committee of the Mustela Foundation.

In 2006, the Mustela Foundation launched a prize for social pediatrics in partnership with the Société Française de Pédiatrie to support a project promoting the positive treatment of children and their families. The Mustela Foundation also carries out action for health protection by distributing free literature.

The Mustela Foundation launched a prize for maieutic in France in 2012, in Belgium in 2014, in Spain in 2017 and in Turkey in 2019. In 2022, the Mustela Foundation launched the Vulnerabilities Research Grant in France.

== Company's management ==
Laboratoires Expanscience is managed by Jean-Paul Berthomé who is the President and Sophie Robert-Velut, Chief Executive Officer.

== Financial Data ==
In 2025, Laboratoires Expanscience had a turnover of 364.2 million Euros, 18% made in France and 82% internationally.
