= Elmfield Rudolf Steiner School =

Elmfield Rudolf Steiner School Limited

Location
- 14 Love Lane; Stourbridge, West Midlands, DY8 2EA; England; 52.4455°N 2.1474°W

Information
- Type: Private non-selective school
- Established: 1934
- Founder: Eileen Hutchins
- Local authority: Dudley
- Head teacher: College of Teachers
- Gender: Co-educational
- Age: 3 to 17
- Enrolment: 320
- Website: http://www.elmfield.com/

Elmfield Rudolf Steiner School Limited is an independent school situated in Stourbridge, West Midlands, England. It educates around 260 children aged from 3 to 17 who follow the international Steiner Waldorf Education curriculum.

== History ==
The school was established in 1934 and moved to its present site in 1946, using as a base two Victorian houses, Thornhill and Parkhill. New buildings were added in 1979 (the school hall) and 1995 (the Tobias and Gawain buildings). These provided additional classrooms, a science laboratory, a dance and music hall and facilities for information technology.

== Academics ==
In October 2006 Ofsted reported that the school provided a satisfactory standard of education. The moral, social and cultural development of the pupils was particularly good. In 2006 75% of students obtained 5 or more A*-C GCSEs.

French and German are taught from age six. Regular class exchanges are held with other European Steiner Waldorf schools. Every year the pupils of class nine go on exchange to the Schloss Hamborn Steiner School, Germany to stay with the class nine there. They take a full part in school life, as well as working on the school's farm.

== Notable teachers ==
Eileen Hutchins, teacher, author and founder of Elmfield School.

Walter Braithwaite (1906-1991) was a music teacher, piano teacher and pianist at the school. He wrote several songs for school plays and festivals, two of which (Ut queant laxis and The Spring by the Wayside or Bare is the Rock) are still regularly sung at Elmfield.
