= Francis Edmunds =

English Educator, Anthroposophist, Writer

Francis Edmunds (30 March 1902 – 13 November 1989) was an educator and Anthroposophist and the founder of Emerson College, Forest Row who was born in Vilnius, Lithuania and died in Forest Row, East Sussex.

== Biography ==
=== Early years ===
Louis Francis Edmunds was born into an orthodox Russian-Jewish family. His mother died when he was two years of age, whereupon his father emigrated to the United Kingdom, leaving Francis in the care of his grandparents until he was of an age to start school in England. He then joined his father in London, who had since acquired a second family with the sister of his first wife. On leaving school, Francis distanced himself from the faith of his family and embarked on a study of Medicine.

From 1922 to 1924 he was part of a Quaker mission to Russia, distributing emergency rations on horseback to the starving farming population during the Bolshevik Revolution. On returning to England, his interests having switched from Medicine to Education, he was sent to a Quaker Friends School in Lebanon, and later taught at the International School in Geneva, Switzerland.

=== Steiner education ===
Through a friend he was introduced to Rudolf Steiner’s Anthroposophy, studied briefly at the Goetheanum in Dornach and became a member of the Anthroposophical Society in 1930. In England once again, he took up contact with the teachers of “The New School” (today Michael Hall) that had been founded in Streatham, South London in 1925. In 1932 he was asked to take on the first grade, which soon led to various other responsibilities in the school.

In 1936 his colleagues asked him to direct what was to become the Michael Hall Teacher Training Course, the first organised Steiner training in Britain, which he ran for years besides his teaching work.

During World War II, the school, now called Michael Hall, was evacuated to Minehead in Somerset. Here Edmunds began to write the Michael Hall News and held many lectures for the soldiers stationed there to guard the coastline. After the War the school moved to Kidbrooke Hall Forest Row in Sussex. It was then that he began to travel extensively, mainly to the United States, in order to help the Waldorf Schools in those parts to develop. Besides this, he and his wife Elizabeth for many years ran the school hostel, living together with the boarders in Kidbrooke Mansion with their own three children.

Concerned that the British Steiner schools begin consequentially to work together he founded and was chairman of the "Steiner Schools Fellowship” for many years.

=== Emerson College ===
Finally, in 1962, he was able to found an adult education centre for Anthroposophy which he named Emerson College after the American Transcendentalist philosopher Ralph Waldo Emerson. He was able to attract a number of inspiring lecturers to work at the college with him, including John Davy, Michael Wilson, William Mann, Anthony Kay, Herbert Koepf and his wife Elizabeth. The college offered a Foundation Year in Anthroposophy followed by a further year in either Education, Biodynamics or various arts. By the 1979s it had an annual enrollment of around 200 students.

In the last years of his life Edmunds began to write the books, particularly on Waldorf Education, that have become well known introductory works into these concepts.

A series of audio sessions, conducted by William Hearst II and produced by John Swain, are available at SensingTheTruth.org. These recordings span approximately 7 hours over 4 sessions, and present an extended conversation with Edmunds on a variety of topics.

== Published works ==
- Rudolf Steiner’s Gift to Education: The Waldorf Schools, L. F. Edmunds, Rudolf Steiner Press: 3rd Edition 1982 ISBN 978-0854402854
- Renewing Education: Selected Writings by Francis Edmunds, Learning Resources Series Hawthorne Press Ltd January 1982 ISBN 978-1869890315
- An Introduction to Anthroposophy: Rudolf Steiner's World View Francis Edmunds Sophia Books January 2006 ISBN 978-1855841635
- From Thinking to Living: The Work of Rudolf Steiner by Francis Edmunds, Element Books Ltd (November 1991) ISBN 978-1852301309
- Quest for Meaning by L. Francis Edmunds, Bloomsbury Academic (April 13, 1998) ISBN 978-0826410702
