= Anthroposophic medicine =

Form of alternative medicine

Anthroposophic medicine (or anthroposophical medicine) is a form of alternative medicine based on pseudoscientific and occult notions. Devised in the 1920s by Rudolf Steiner (1861–1925) in conjunction with Ita Wegman (1876–1943), anthroposophical medicine draws on Steiner's spiritual philosophy, which he called anthroposophy. Practitioners employ a variety of treatment techniques based upon anthroposophic precepts, including massage, exercise, counselling, and administration of substances.

Many drug preparations used in anthroposophic medicine are ultra-diluted, similar to those used in homeopathy. Homeopathic remedies are not medically effective and are generally considered harmless, except when used as a substitute for a scientifically proven and effective prevention and cure. In certain European countries, people with cancer are sometimes prescribed remedies made from specially harvested mistletoe, although no evidence of clinical benefit exists. Some anthroposophic doctors oppose childhood vaccination, and this has led to preventable outbreaks of disease.

Anthroposophic medicine departs from fundamental biological, physical, and chemical principles in several respects. For example, Steiner said that the heart is not a pump, but that the blood, in a sense, pumps itself. Anthroposophic medicine also proposes that patients' past lives may influence their illness and that the course of an illness is subject to karmic destiny. Professor of complementary medicine Edzard Ernst and other physicians and scientists including Simon Singh and David Gorski have characterized anthroposophic medicine as pseudoscientific quackery, with no basis in reason or logic.

== Background ==
Co-founders of anthroposophic medicine

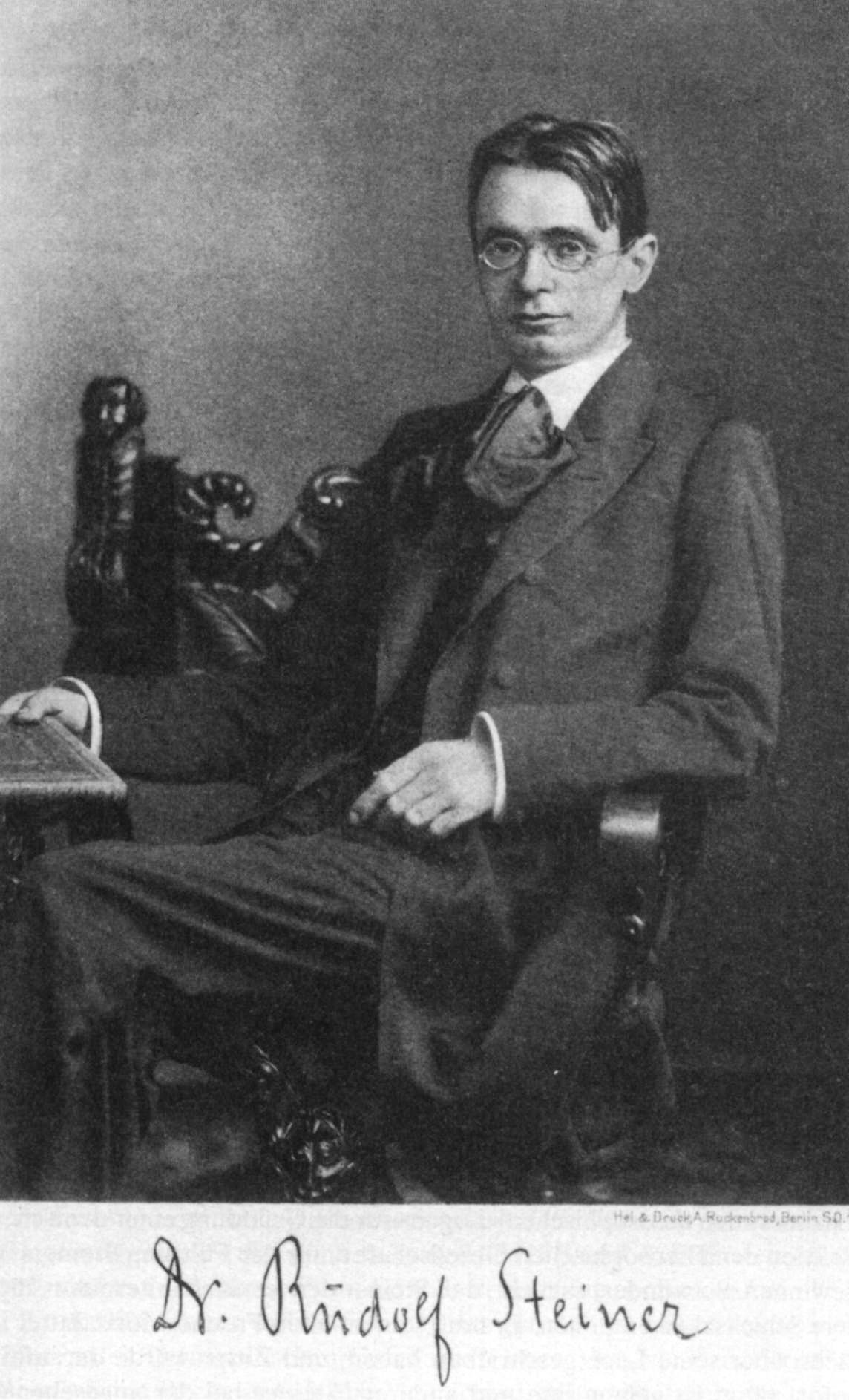
Rudolf Steiner

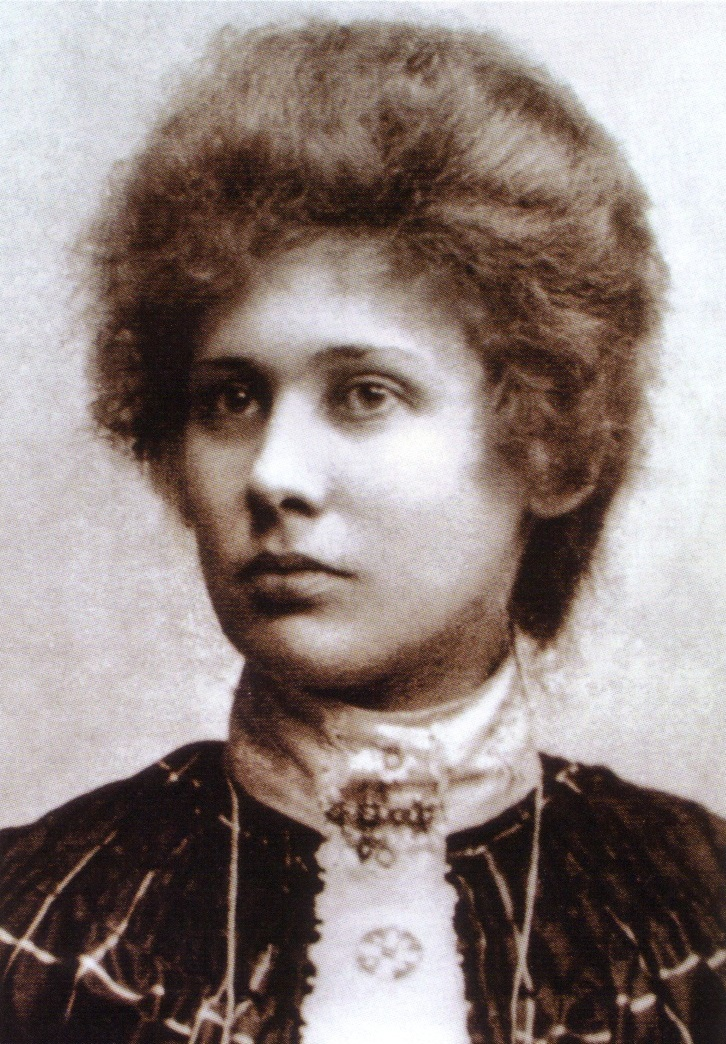
Ita Wegman

=== History ===
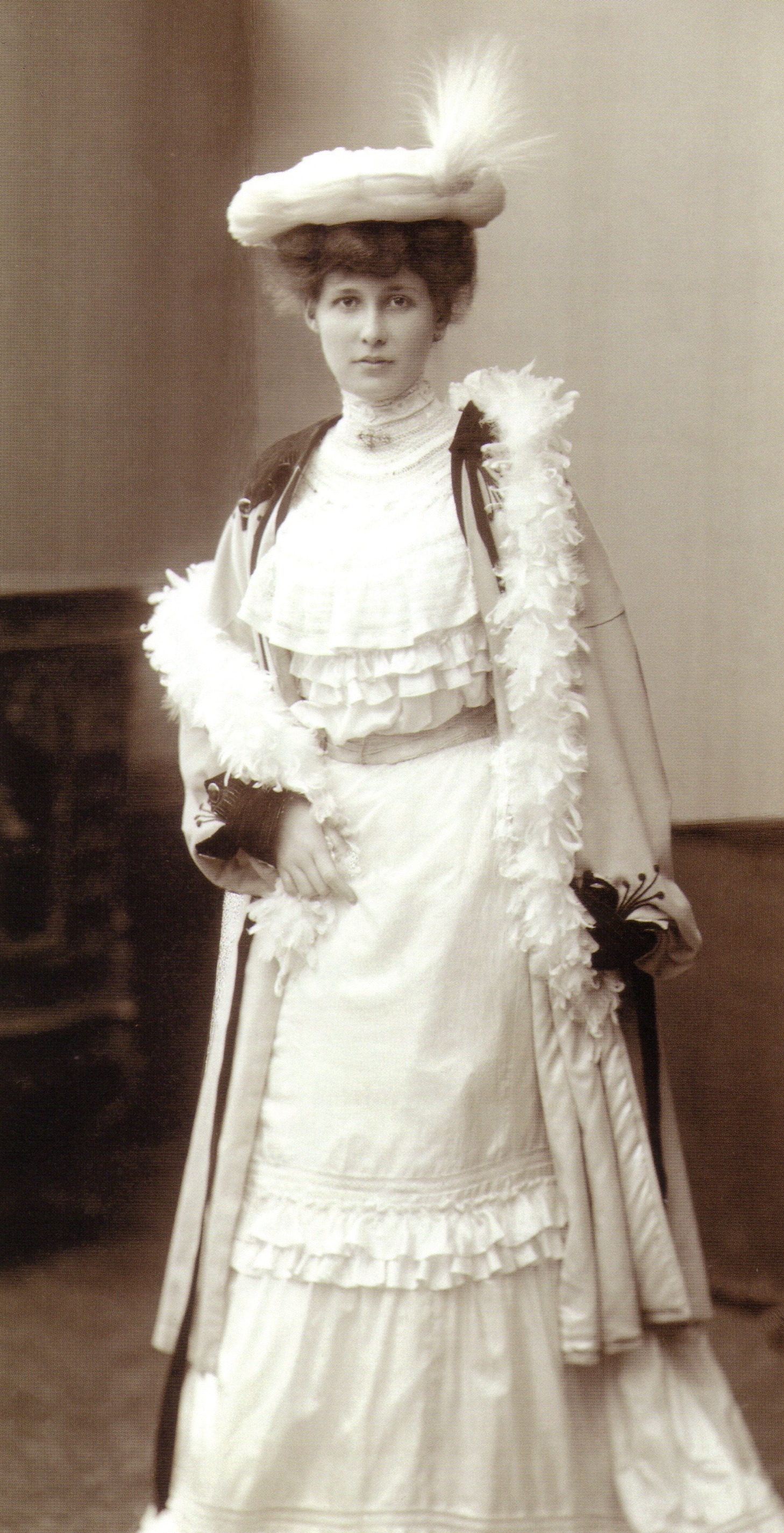
Ita Wegman, co-founder of the medical approach, before 1900 in Berlin

Steiner is also known for bizarre statements such as "knitting produces strong teeth" or "overstimulating intelligence produces dwarfism".

According to Egil Asprem, "Steiner's teachings had a clear authoritarian ring, and developed a rather crass polemic against 'materialism', 'liberalism', and cultural 'degeneration'. [...] For example, anthroposophical medicine was developed to contrast with the 'materialistic' (and hence 'degenerate') medicine of the establishment." According to anthroposophy, mainstream medical science is "Ahrimanic".

The first steps toward an anthroposophic approach to medicine were taken before 1920, when homeopathic physicians and pharmacists began working with Steiner, who recommended a new form of pharmacy, Anthroposophic Pharmacy, along with specific preparation methods and an anthroposophic concept of humankind. In 1921, Ita Wegman opened the first anthroposophic medical clinic, now known as the Klinik Arlesheim, in Arlesheim, Switzerland. Wegman was soon joined by several other clinicians, who trained the first anthroposophic nurses for the clinic.

At Wegman's request, Steiner regularly visited the clinic and suggested treatment regimes for particular patients. Between 1920 and 1925, he also gave several series of medical lectures. In 1925, Wegman and Steiner wrote the first book on the anthroposophic approach to medicine, Fundamentals of Therapy.

Wegman later opened a separate clinic and curative home in Ascona. Wegman lectured widely, visiting the Netherlands and England particularly frequently, and an increasing number of physicians began to include the anthroposophic approach in their practices. The Lukas Clinic, a cancer clinic, opened in Arlesheim in 1963.

In 1976, anthroposophic medicine in Germany was regulated by law as a specific therapeutic system (Besondere Therapierichtung) under the Medicines Act and the Social Law Code V. In the 1990s, the Witten/Herdecke University in Germany established a chair in anthroposophical medicine. The press described the appointment as a "death sentence," and the perception that pseudoscience was being taught damaged the university's reputation, bringing it to the brink of financial collapse. The university was ultimately saved by a cash injection from Software AG, a technology corporation with a history of funding anthroposophic projects.

In 2012, the University of Aberdeen considered establishing a chair in holistic health jointly funded by Software AG and the Anthroposophic Health, Education, and Social Care Movement, each of which would provide £1.5 million of endowment. Edzard Ernst commented, "that any decent university should even consider an anthroposophical medicine unit seems incomprehensible. The fact that it would be backed by people who have a financial interest in this bogus approach makes it even worse." The university's governance and nominations committee eventually decided not to proceed with the appointment.

Joseph A. Schwarcz (2022) regards Steiner as a quack.

=== Categorization and conceptual basis ===
The categorization of anthroposophical medicine is complex because it both complements and substitutes conventional medicine. In 2008, Ernst wrote that it was being promoted as an "extension to conventional medicine".

Ernst writes that Steiner used imagination and insight as a basis for his ideas, drawing on mystical knowledge from the occult Akashic Records, a work supposedly situated on the astral plane, which Steiner said he could access via his intuitive powers. On this basis, Steiner proposed "associations between four postulated dimensions of the human body (physical body, etheric body, astral body, and ego), plants, minerals, and the cosmos". Steiner also proposed a connection betweens planets, metals and organs so that, for example, the planet Mercury, the element mercury and the lung were all somehow associated. These propositions form the basis of anthroposophical medicine.

Ernst has said that anthroposophical medicine "includes some of the least plausible theories one could possibly imagine", categorized it as "pure quackery", and said that it "has no basis in science". According to Quackwatch, anthroposophical medicine practitioners regard illness as a "rite of passage" necessary to purge spiritual impurities carried over from past lives, according to the precepts of "karmic destiny".

The French governmental anti-cult agency MIVILUDES reported in 2022 that it remains vigilant about anthroposophy, especially because of its deviant medical applications and its work with underage persons. According to Ernst, "Anthroposophic medicine is based on several bizarre assumptions".

Proponents of anthroposophic medicine make several irrational assumptions, for instance, they claim that our past lives influence our present health, or that the course of an illness is determined by our 'karmic' destiny.

— Edzard Ernst (2019)

== Methods ==
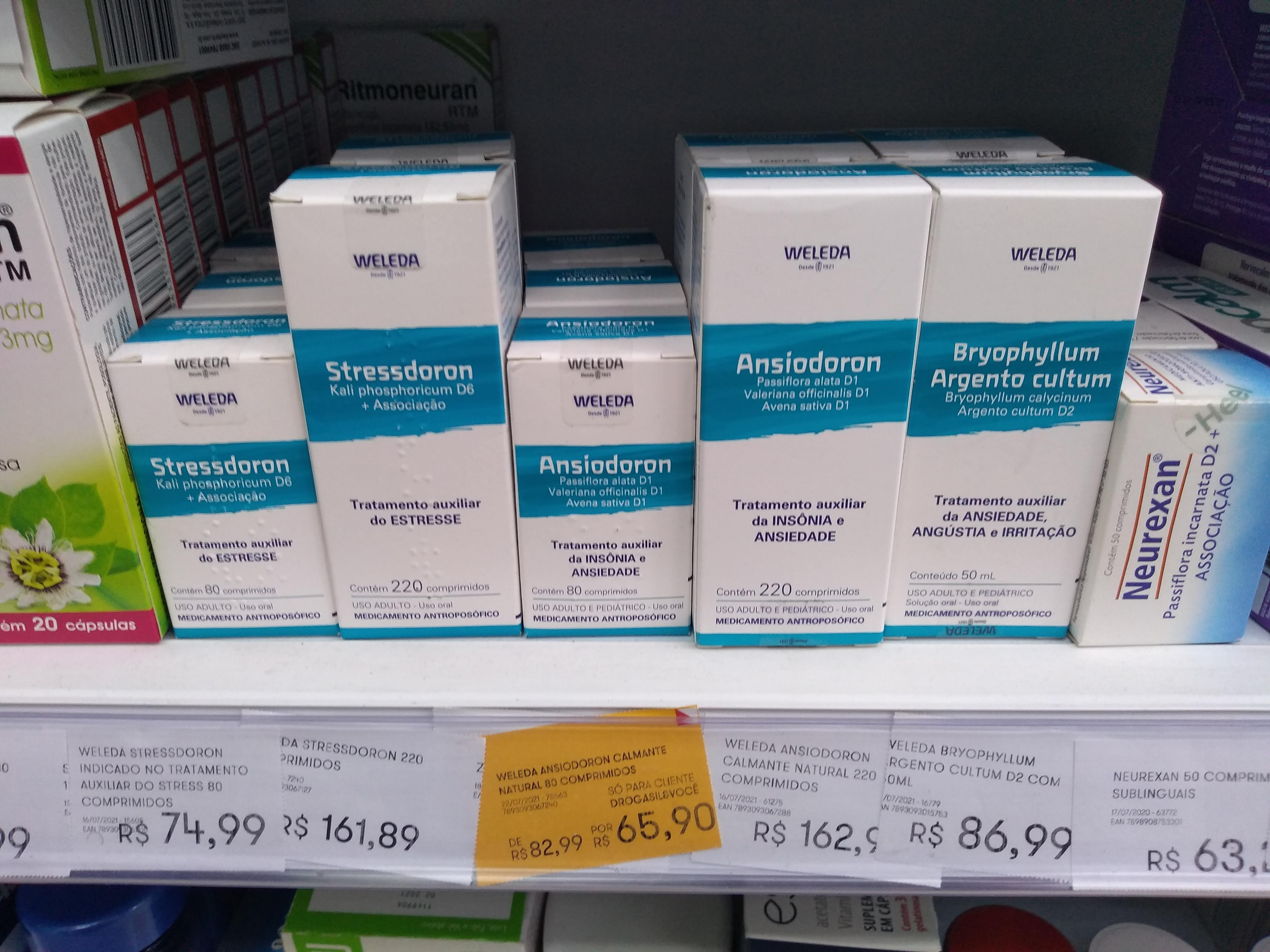
Weleda anthroposophic products sold in Brazil

In anthroposophic pharmacy, drugs are prepared according to notions of alchemy and homeopathy rather than the science underlying modern pharmacology. During the preparation process, patterns formed by crystallization are interpreted to see which "etheric force" they most closely resemble. Most anthroposophic preparations are highly diluted, akin to homeopathic remedies. This means that, while they are completely harmless in themselves, using them in place of conventional medicine to treat serious illness carries a risk of severe adverse consequences.

As well as drug remedies, anthroposophical medicine also includes:

- Anthroposophic nursing
- Counselling
- Eurythmy – claimed to affect "inner life functions" leading to a "re-integration of body, soul, and spirit".
- External applications
- Rhythmic massages

=== Plant-derived treatments ===
To select an anthroposophic substance for a particular illness, practitioners consider the source of the substances used. The character of a mineral, plant, or animal is hypothesised to have been formed by the substances most active within it, in the belief that this character may also influence what those substances accomplish when given to treat another organism. This is related to the doctrine of signatures. Willow, for example, is considered to have an unusual character:

... plants that grow near water are usually heavy, with big, dark green leaves that wilt and break easily. An exception is ... the white willow, a tree that always grows near water and loves light. However, unlike other "watery" plants, the willow has fine, almost dry leaves and looks very light ... Its branches are unbelievably tough. They are elastic and cannot be broken. They bend easily and form "joints" rather than break. These few signatures can give us the clue to what salix can be used for therapeutically: arthritis, deformation of joints, swollen joints ...

There is no scientific evidence that the shape of plants has ever caused a new medical property to be discovered.

=== Beliefs about human biology ===
Steiner described the heart not as a pump but as a regulator of flow, such that the heartbeat itself can be distinguished from the circulation of blood. Anthroposophic medicine claims the flow of blood of the circulatory system is, as Marinelli put it, "propelled with its own biological momentum, as can be seen in the embryo, and boosts itself with induced momenta from the heart".

This view of the heart is not based on any scientific theory and has been characterized as "crank science".

Steiner believed that the sex of a baby was determined at the moment of conception by the alignment of the stars.

Steiner's model of anatomy was based on a three-part notion whereby the head is the "thinking part," the abdomen and limbs the "metabolic part," and the chest and heart a "rhythmic center".

Steiner's ideas on diets could have led to better health outcomes than common nutrition of German society of his time, although the theoretical backing, which relied on intuition, is now recognized as incorrect.

According to Dan Dugan, Steiner challenged established science in the following ways:

1. by supporting vitalism;
2. by doubting germ theory;
3. by ignoring physiological systems;
4. by hypothesizing that "the heart is not a pump".

=== Reaction to COVID-19 ===
During the COVID-19 pandemic, Steiner hospitals in Germany became notorious amongst healthcare authorities for forcing quack remedies on sedated hospital patients, some of whom were critically ill. Remedies used included ginger poultices and homeopathic pellets claimed to contain the dust of shooting stars. Stefan Kluge, the director of intensive care medicine at Hamburg's University Medical Centre, said the claims of anthroposophic providers during the pandemic were "highly unprofessional" and that they "risk[ed] causing uncertainty among patients".

=== Mistletoe treatment for cancer ===
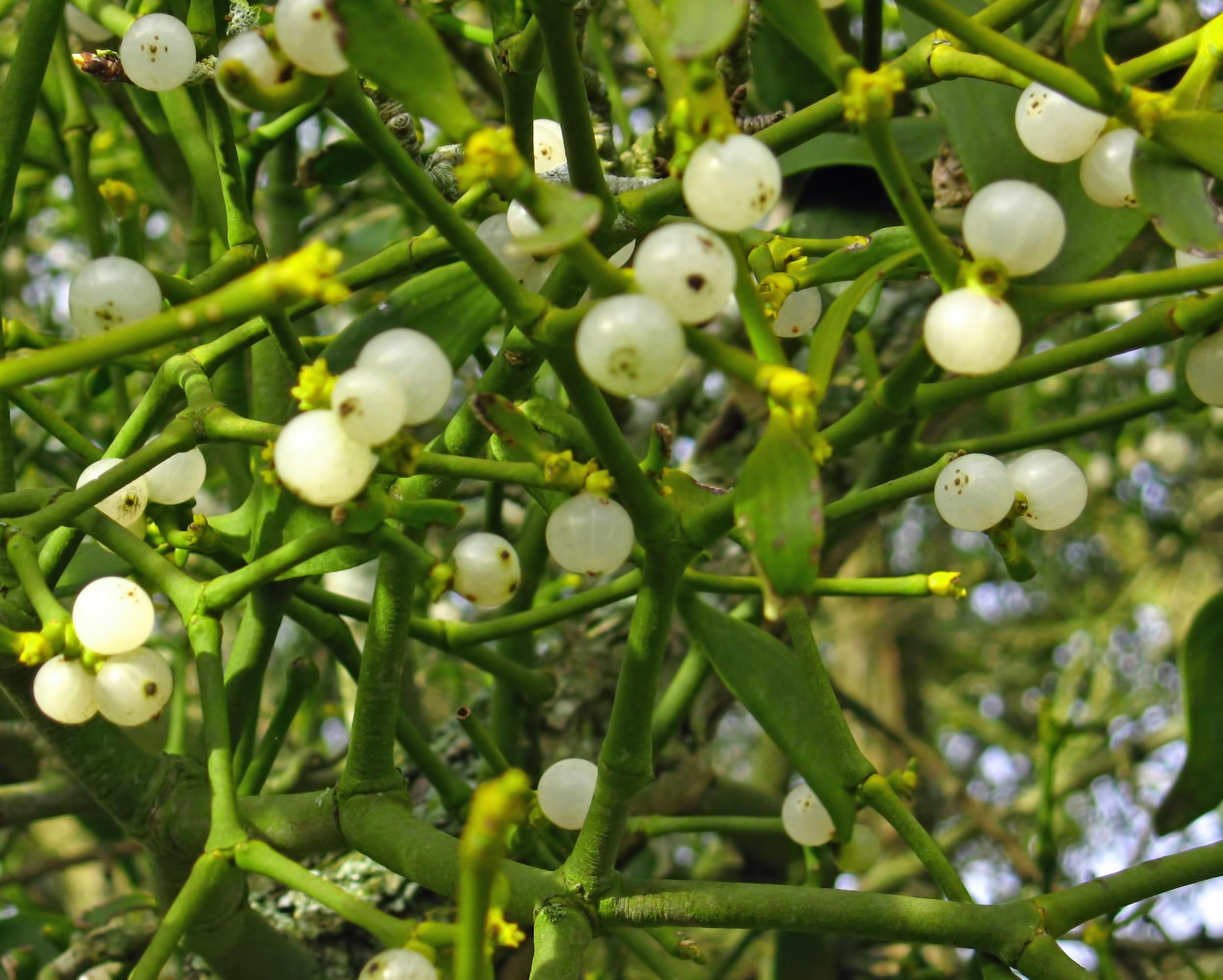
Mistletoe – Steiner said that harvesting it when the planets were aligned would yield a cancer treatment.

Rudolf Steiner conjectured that mistletoe could cure cancer based on the observation that the plant was a parasite that eventually killed its host—a process he claimed paralleled the progression of cancer. Steiner believed the plant's medical potential was influenced by the position of the sun, moon, and planets and that it was important to harvest the plant at the right time. Some mistletoe preparations are ultra-diluted; others are made from fermented mistletoe. The most commonly used trade names for mistletoe drugs are Iscador and Helixor.

Although laboratory experiments have suggested that mistletoe extract may affect the immune system and be able to kill some kinds of cancer cells, there is little evidence of its benefit to people with cancer. Most of the clinical research claiming that mistletoe therapy is effective is published in Germany, and it is generally considered unreliable because of major lapses in quality. Edzard Ernst wrote that research by anthroposophic clinicians often reached positive conclusions on mistletoe therapy because it drew on unreliable material; independent researchers tended instead to find no evidence of benefit. The American Cancer Society says that "available evidence from well-designed clinical trials does not support claims that mistletoe can improve length or quality of life".

Mistletoe-based cancer drugs are widely used in Europe, especially in German-speaking countries. In 2002, nearly half a million prescriptions were paid for by German health insurance, and in 2006, there were reportedly around 30 types of mistletoe extract on the market. Mistletoe extracts have been used as an unconventional treatment for cancer patients in the Netherlands, and in Germany, the treatment has been approved as palliative therapy to treat the symptoms of patients with malignant tumors. In Sweden, controversially, mistletoe therapy has been approved for use in the treatment of cancer symptoms.

In other countries, mistletoe therapy is virtually unknown. The United States Food and Drug Administration has not approved mistletoe-based drugs for any purpose; mistletoe extracts may not be distributed in or imported to the U.S. except for research purposes. As of 2015 no mistletoe-based drugs are licensed for use in the United Kingdom.

A 2013 article on mistletoe in Lancet Oncology invoked Ben Goldacre's observation that a geographical preference for certain therapies was a hallmark of quackery, and proposed that the continuing use of this "apparently ineffectual therapy" in a small cluster of countries was based on sociological rather than medical reasons, indicating a need for a more informed consent from patients.

== Immunization ==
The risks arising from using anthroposophical medicine as a substitute for evidence-based medicine are exemplified by several cases of low vaccination levels in Waldorf schools, since some anthroposophical doctors oppose immunization. A 1999 study of children in Sweden showed that in Waldorf schools, only 18% had received MMR vaccination, compared to a level of 93% in other schools nationally.

A 2003 report of a widespread measles outbreak around Coburg, Germany, identified a Waldorf school as the origin. At the time, the town's mayor had condemned homeopathic doctors who had discouraged vaccination, saying, "Their stronghold is the Waldorf School, which actively encourages people not to have their children vaccinated. Now we have an epidemic."

Paul Offit wrote that Steiner believed vaccination "interferes with karmic development and the cycles of reincarnation", and that adherence to this belief led to a 2008 pertussis outbreak in a Californian Waldorf school, causing its temporary closure.

Anthroposophists have various views about vaccination, and Steiner's statements thereupon are complex.

== See also ==
- Alternative cancer treatments
- Herbalism
- Holistic health
