= Milwaukee Urban Waldorf School =

School in Wisconsin, United States

Coordinates: 43°02′51.8″N 87°56′50.3″W

The Milwaukee Urban Waldorf School is located in Milwaukee, Wisconsin in the United States. It is a public school using a curriculum and teaching methodologies based upon Waldorf education.

== Waldorf methods ==
Since switching to Waldorf methods, the Milwaukee Urban Waldorf Elementary School has shown an increase in parental involvement, a reduction in suspensions, improvements in standardized test scores for both reading and writing (counter to the district trend), while expenditures per pupil are below many regular district programs. The school converted to Waldorf methods in 1991, when it had 350 students, about 90% of them African American. On the Milwaukee public schools standard third-grade evaluation, the number of children reading above grade level went from 26% in 1992 to 63% in 1995. Waldorf's adaptable and individualized curriculum has been mentioned as a factor in the school's success in addressing children of poverty and children of color.

The school has been cited as a positive learning environment, in which the students as well as their background seemed to be treated with respect, and where pupils are both encouraged and trusted to be responsible; the school principal gave a strong positive evaluation of the Waldorf approach. The study cited the school's pleasing aesthetic, positive teaching environment, safe atmosphere and warm relations despite the "difficult life that surrounds UWS and many of its children". The report also discussed the challenge of meeting societal racism and biases of teachers and students in modern-day America.
