= Ravenswood, Berkshire =

Coordinates: 51.376°N 0.817°W

Ravenswood
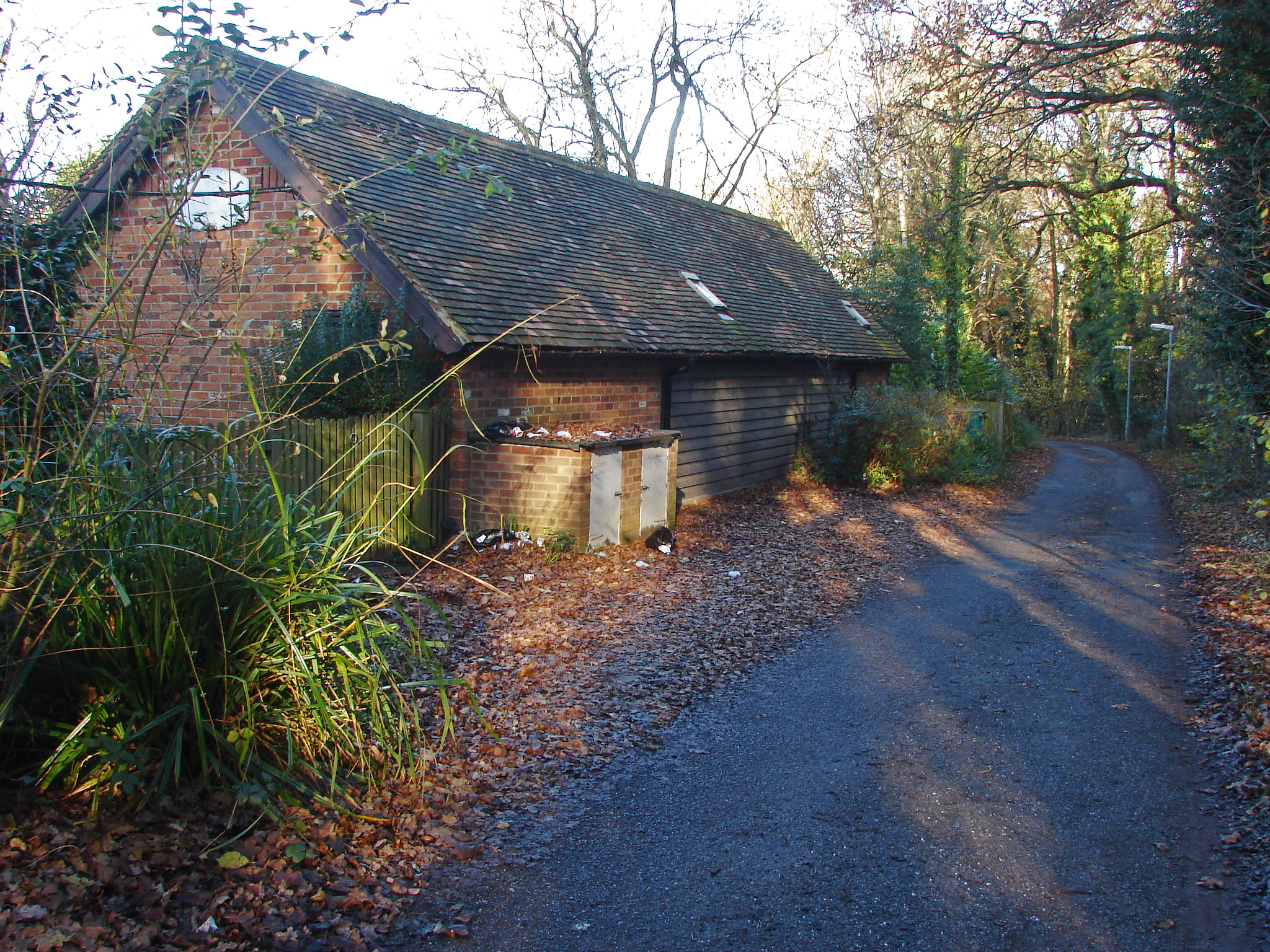

- Location within Berkshire
- OS grid reference: SU823647
- Civil parish: Wokingham Without
- Unitary authority: Wokingham
- Ceremonial county: Berkshire
- Region: South East
- Country: England
- Sovereign state: United Kingdom
- Post town: Crowthorne
- Postcode district: RG45
- Dialling code: 01344
- Police: Thames Valley
- Fire: Royal Berkshire
- Ambulance: South Central
- UK Parliament: Wokingham

Ravenswood is a care village run by Norwood, a Jewish charity supporting adults with learning disabilities, in the English county of Berkshire, part of the civil parish of Wokingham Without, adjoining Crowthorne.

The settlement was established in 1953 as a self-contained environment for disabled children. The complex is managed by Norwood and funded by the local authority, and is about 1.5 miles (2.4 km) north-west Crowthorne.

It stands on the site of Bigshotte Lodge, the home of the Keeper of Bigshotte Rayles, an ancient division of Windsor Forest. It used to be called Hannican's Lodge, after a man called Hankin or Hanykin who was under-keeper in 1607. This became Bigshotte School, which became Ravenswood children's home in 1946. In 1953, four families took over the Ravenswood estate, with the aim of providing residential care and education for their children with learning disabilities. Today, Ravenswood Village provides person centred care and support for almost one hundred adults with neurodevelopmental disabilities through both residential care and supported living services in a community setting.
