= Herbert Hahn =

German teacher, author and Anthroposophist

Herbert Hahn (* 5 May 1890 – † 20 June 1970) was a German teacher and Anthroposophist. He was born in Pärnu Estonia, then part of the Russian Empire; he died in Stuttgart.

== Biography ==
Hahn grew up in the old Hanseatic city of Pärnu in the Governorate of Livonia, the fifth child of city gardener Carl Wilhelm Hahn († 1905) from Mecklenburg and his wife Pauline from Riga. At home, German was spoken and at school Estonian and Russian.

Between 1907 and 1913 he studied Philology in Dorpat, Heidelberg, Paris and Berlin; and completed a Phd from the University of Rostock in 1921. In January 1909 he met Rudolf Steiner and became a member of the Theosophical Society three years later. After obtaining his Russian teacher's diploma in the summer of 1912, he worked as a French language teacher in a private school in Mariupol. and in 1914 passed his examinations as secondary school teacher in Moscow. In September 1913 he married Emely Hasselbach from Ladenburg and by 1924 they had four sons. After the outbreak of WW I during his summer holidays in Germany, he became a German citizen and from 1915 onwards did military service as an interpreter.

From 1919 onwards Hahn taught French at the first Waldorf School in Stuttgart, becoming a Class Teacher between 1921 and 1927 and finally History and German language teacher in the high school. Steiner entrusted him with the task of giving “free religion lessons” (for those children who did not belong to any of the denominations) and within this context he held the first “Sunday Service” in 1920. From 1931 until 1939 he taught at the Vrije School in The Hague.

During WW II he was once again deployed as interpreter and in this way returned to Russia after 25 years absence. In 1943 he married his teaching colleague Maria Uhland (1893–1978). After the war, he returned to the Stuttgart Waldorf School, re-founded after the Nazi period and served as its unofficial director until his retirement in 1961. Of his numerous works as an author especially his recollections of Rudolf Steiner and his main work, Vom Genius Europas, his outline of an anthroposophical Cultural psychology that may be mentioned. Most of his works are unavailable in English.

== Literary work ==
- From the Wellsprings of the Soul Rudolf Steiner School Fellowship, 1977 (Translated from ‘’Von den Quellkräften der Seele’’ below).
- Notes from Memory (Notizen aus der Erinnerung) about the founding of the Esoteric Youth Circle with letter by Ernst Lehrs in „Rudolf Steiner. Esoteric Lessons 1913-1923: From the Esoteric School, Vol. 3 Steiner Books (October 1, 2011) English ISBN 0880106182 ISBN 978-0880106184
- Ein Meister der Liebe und andere Erzählungen, Legenden, Märchen. Surkamp, Stuttgart 1927.
- Wege und Sterne. Gedichte. Orient-Occident, Stuttgart 1928.
- Vom Ernst des Spielens. Eine zeitgemäße Betrachtung über Spielzeug und Spiel. Waldorfschul-Verlag, Stuttgart 1929. (Mellinger, Stuttgart 1988, ISBN 3-88069-032-4)
- Das Erwachen des Geigers und andere Erzählungen von Schicksalsruf, Krankheit und Genesung. Surkamp, Stuttgart um 1930. (Mellinger, Stuttgart 1990, ISBN 3-88069-249-1)
- Sonne um Mitternacht. Gedichte und Sprüche. Surkamp, Stuttgart o. J.
- Von Elisabeth der Thüringerin, Friedrich, dem Andern und den Rittern. Heitz, Leipzig um 1932.
  - Neuauflage als: Elisabeth von Thüringen. Geering, Dornach 1982, ISBN 3-7235-0335-7.
- Das Heilige Land. Reisebilder und Eindrücke. Urachhaus, Stuttgart 1940. (Mellinger, Stuttgart 1990, ISBN 3-88069-250-5)
- Schritt für Schritt wird Weg gewonnen. Zeugnissprüche und Gedichte. Mellinger, Stuttgart 1952. (2. Auflage. 1985, ISBN 3-88069-015-4)
- Seltsame Jahrmarktleute. Legendäre Erzählung. Mellinger, Stuttgart 1955. (3. Auflage. 1989, ISBN 3-88069-186-X)
- Das goldene Kästchen. Erzählungen – Legenden – Märchen. Mellinger, Stuttgart 1958. (4. Auflage. 1989, ISBN 3-88069-033-2)
- Der Unvollendete. Skizze eines Geistesbildes von Friedrich Schiller. Mellinger, Stuttgart 1959.
- Von den Quellkräften der Seele. Zur religiösen Unterweisung der Jugend. Natura, Arlesheim 1959. (Mellinger, Stuttgart 1990, ISBN 3-88069-150-9)
- Rudolf Steiner, wie ich ihn sah und erlebte. Freies Geistesleben, Stuttgart 1961. (Mellinger, Stuttgart 1990, ISBN 3-88069-247-5)
- Vom Genius Europas. Wesensbilder von zwölf europäischen Völkern, Ländern, Sprachen. 2 Bände. Freies Geistesleben, Stuttgart 1963/64. (Neuausgabe in 4 Taschenbuch-Bänden 1992)
- Der Lebenslauf als Kunstwerk. Rhythmen, Leitmotive, Gesetze in gegenübergestellten Biographien. Freies Geistesleben, Stuttgart 1966.
- Un’ anima cantava – eine Seele sang. Begegnungen mit Beniamino Gigli. Mellinger, Stuttgart 1966.
- Der Weg, der mich führte. Lebenserinnerungen. Freies Geistesleben, Stuttgart 1969.
- Sonne im Tautropfen. Beiträge zur Diätetik der Seele. Mellinger, Stuttgart 1990, ISBN 3-88069-256-4.
