= Michael Henry Wilson =

British musician and scientist (1901–1985)

Michael Wilson (1 July 1901 in Birmingham, United Kingdom – 22 December 1985 in Stourbridge, United Kingdom), was a musician, curative educator, scientist, translator and General Secretary of the Anthroposophical Society in Great Britain.

== Biography ==
Michael Henry Wilson was born into a Quaker family in 1901. His mother Theodora Wilson, had met Rudolf Steiner and visited the first Goetheanum. For some years he was a professional violinist and conductor. He studied at the Goetheanum and became fluent in German. Later he was a founder and director of the first curative home in the UK. He translated a number of Rudolf Steiner's works and researched and lectured on Goethe's Theory of Colours.

Although at school Michael had specialized in Physics and Chemistry, with a view to taking over the successful chemical plant his father owned and ran, he decided to study Violin and Conducting at the Royal Academy of Music. He later (1929) became second conductor of the British National Opera Orchestra under Sir John Barbirolli, played as Concert Master under Sir Thomas Beecham and was a close friend of Sir Adrian Boult.

A meeting with the German curative educator, Fried Geuter, in 1929 caused him to break off a successful musical career. Lady Cynthia Chance has described this in her memoirs. She was invited to a lecture by a Mrs Lloyd Wilson (Michael Wilson's mother) who ran an Anthroposophical study group in the area, to be held by Fried Geuter:

"Michael Wilson did not take seriously this side of his mother's life and did not come to the lecture. But afterwards he began to talk to this lecturer, who seemed rather different from those who usually came to speak or attended the meetings. Michael, a professional musician, studied at the Royal College of Music, at that time under Sir Adrian Boult. He found that not only did Fried Geuter know a great deal about music and musicians, but was able to enlarge upon Michael's own knowledge and experience. Fried also told Michael something of his work and its inspiration from Rudolf Steiner. Michael decided to go straight away to join Fried in his effort."

Fried Geuter's vision and intention of establishing a centre for Special Needs education based on Anthroposophy in Birmingham inspired Michael Wilson to start the Sunfield Children's Home for severely disabled children together with him. In 1932 this moved to the village of Clent by Stourbridge, where it continues its work to this day.

It was there that 30 years later, in 1962, Michael Wilson and David Clement, both co-workers of Sunfield Homes, offered space and support to Francis Edmunds in founding Emerson College, and together with him, became its first trustees. Michael Wilson continued to lecture at the college many years after it had moved to Forest Row remaining connected with it until his death.

The great outdoors was a lifelong passion for him. He was an experienced mountaineer and active member of the Alpine Society, having scaled many of the highest peaks of Europe. His interest in the elements, particularly the sound and experience of the wind led him to flying gliders. This he learnt from his friend, the pilot Ralph Brocklebank, who later became his colleague at Sunfield Homes.

His continued interest in physics and chemistry caused him to experiment mainly in the sphere of optics, being particularly interested in theatre lighting and in the colour theory of Goethe. During his time with the British National Opera, he had designed a new lighting system for their stage. These experiences he carried further in working with the staff and children of Sunfield Children's Home in plays, but particularly in developing a specific kind of colour therapy.

This experimentation with physics and Goethe's colour theory brought him in touch with many of the competent experts and businessmen of the time such as with Kodak, television networks and the developers of the Polaroid camera. He regularly attended the conferences of the Physical Society and wrote books and many articles on the subject of our perception of colour and the phenomenon of coloured shadows.

He was a devoted family man with his wife, Betty and their three children, Diana, Robin and Christopher.

He translated the central philosophical work of Rudolf Steiner, The Philosophy of Freedom as well as other works.

== Published work ==
- What is Colour?: The Goethean Approach to a Fundamental Problem – Michael Wilson, Goethean Science Foundation 1949 ASIN B001KF9P4G
- Cosmic Light and Cosmic Warmth Michael Wilson - Rudolf Steiner Press 1930

=== Translations ===
- The Philosophy of Freedom: The Basis for a Modern World Conception by Rudolf Steiner, Translated by Michael Wilson. Steinerbooks 1999 ISBN 978-1855840829
