= Emerson College (UK) =

College in East Sussex, United Kingdom

Coordinates: 51.1001°N 0.0516°E

Emerson College, UK was founded in 1962 by Francis Edmunds. It is now situated on Pixton Hill, Forest Row in East Sussex, UK. It was named after Ralph Waldo Emerson, American poet and transcendentalist. For the past c.60 years there has been an international community of students, teachers, and researchers living and studying on the site inspired by the philosophy and teachings of Rudolf Steiner—which he called Anthroposophy. A book on the history of Emerson College was published in 2013.

== Courses ==
Emerson has been a nest for different courses like Waldorf Teacher Training, Anthroposophical Foundation year, Holistic care, Biodynamic Agriculture, Visual and Performing Arts and Storytelling and so on. At the moment the stronger courses are Storytelling and Visual Arts.

== Research ==
The Flow Design Research Group at the college collaborated with Imperial College and the Royal Brompton Hospital on a study of blood flow in the heart.
