= Ita Wegman =

Dutch physician

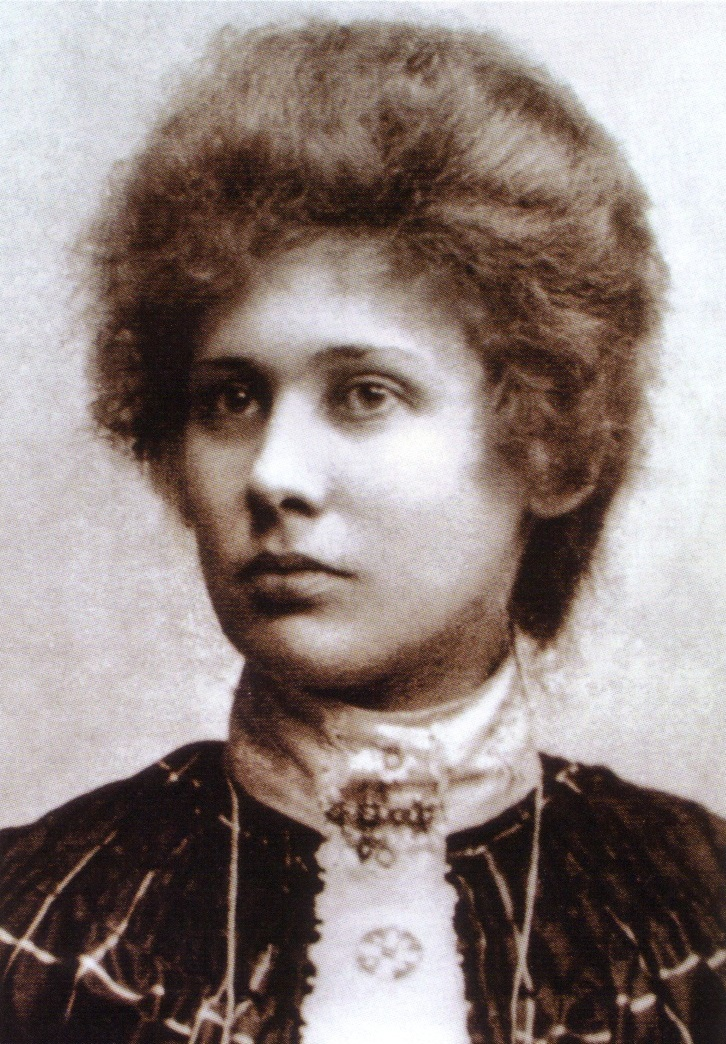
- Ita Wegman in 1899 in Berlin
- Born: Maria Ita Wegman; February 22, 1876; Karawang, West Java, Dutch East Indies
- Died: March 4, 1943 (aged 67); Arlesheim, Switzerland

Ita Wegman (22 February 1876 – 4 March 1943) co-founded Anthroposophical Medicine with Rudolf Steiner. In 1921, she founded the first anthroposophical medical clinic in Arlesheim, known until 2014 as the Ita Wegman Clinic. She also developed a special form of massage therapy, called rhythmical massage, and other self-claimed therapeutic treatments.

== Early life and education ==
Ita Wegman, as she was known throughout her life, was born as Maria Ita Wegman in 1876 in Karawang, West Java, the first child of a Dutch colonial family. Around the turn of the century, she returned to Europe (she had visited before) and studied therapeutic gymnastics and massage. In 1902, when she was 26, she met Rudolf Steiner for the first time. Five years later, she began medical school at the University of Zurich, where women were not discriminated to study medicine. She was granted a diploma as a medical doctor in 1911 with a specialization in women's medicine and joined an existing medical practice.

== Career ==
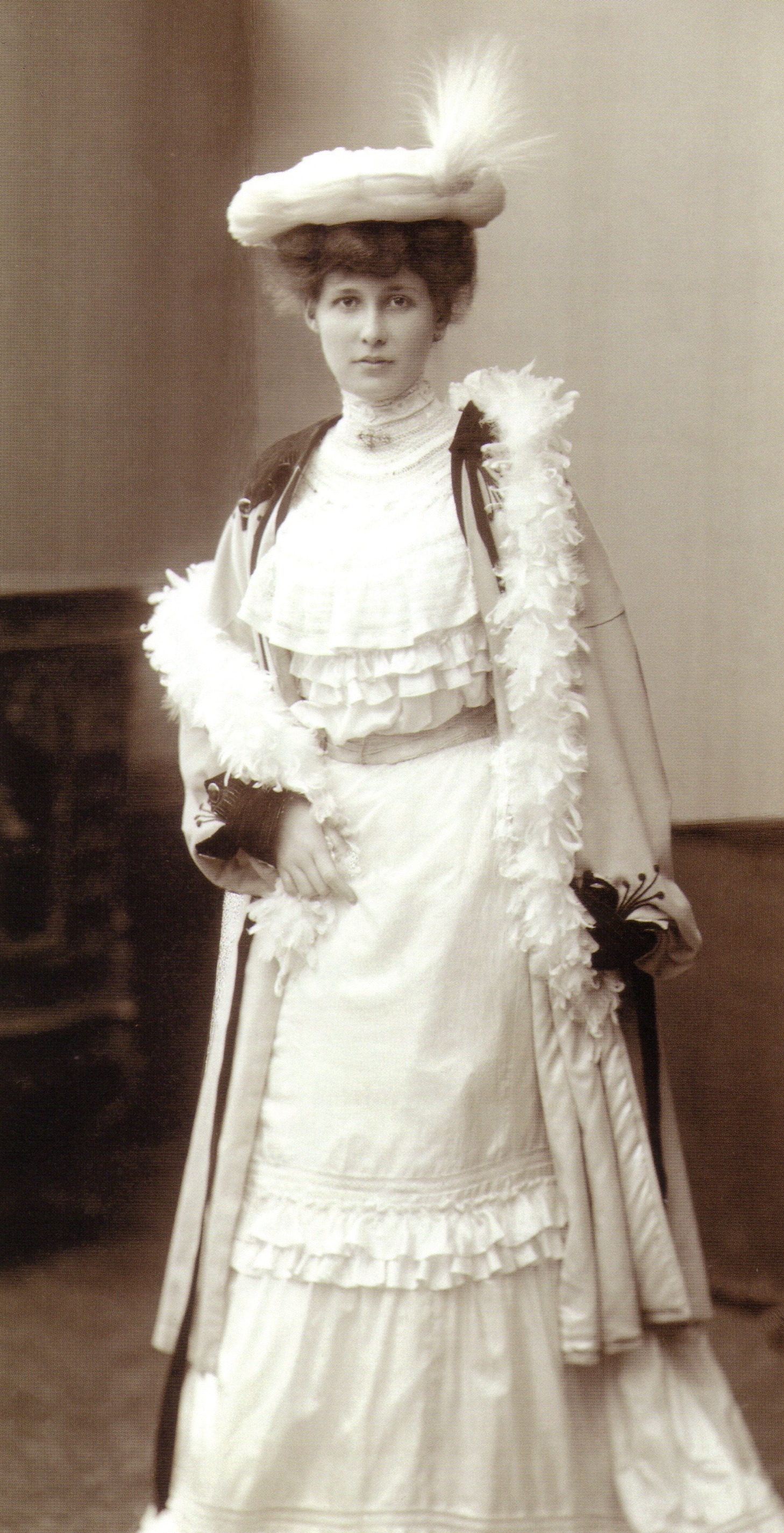
Before 1900 in Berlin

In 1917, having opened an independent practice, she developed a cancer treatment using an extract of mistletoe following indications from Steiner. This first remedy, which she called Iscar, was later developed into Iscador and has become an complementary cancer treatment in Germany and a number of other countries, and is undergoing clinical trials in the U.S.A. There is no evidence that Iscador heals cancer or improves the quality of life of cancer patients.

By 1919 she had a joint practice together with two other doctors, also women. In 1920 she purchased land in Arlesheim, where she opened her own clinic, the Klinisch-Therapeutisches Institut, or Clinical-Therapeutic Institute, the next year. A number of other doctors joined the institute, which grew steadily over the next years as a first center for anthroposophical medicine. In 1922 she founded a therapeutic home for mentally disabled children, Haus Sonnenhof, also in Arlesheim, and co-founded a pharmaceutical laboratory, Weleda, that has since grown into a significant producer of medicines and health-care products.

In the following year, Rudolf Steiner asked Wegman to join the Executive Council of the newly reformed Anthroposophical Society at the Goetheanum in Dornach, Switzerland. She also directed the Medical Section of the research center at the Goetheanum. Together, Wegman and Steiner wrote what was to be Steiner's last book, Extending Practical Medicine (earlier editions were published as Fundamentals of Therapy), which gave a theoretical basis to the new medicine they were developing. The book was partly written while Wegman cared for Steiner, who was already terminally ill. Wegman founded a new medical journal, Natura, the following year.

In 1936, the clinic opened a second home in Ascona, Switzerland. Shortly thereafter, difficulties between Wegman and the rest of the Executive Council flared up, and Wegman was asked to leave the council; in addition, she and a number of supporters had their membership in the Anthroposophical Society itself withdrawn. The medical work flourished, however, and Wegman travelled extensively in support of the rapidly growing movement to extend medicine's limits; she was especially active in the Netherlands and England during this time.

Wegman died in Arlesheim in 1943, at the age of 67.

== See also ==
- Holism
- Biopsychosocial model
