= Rudolf Steiner =

Austrian esotericist (1861–1925)

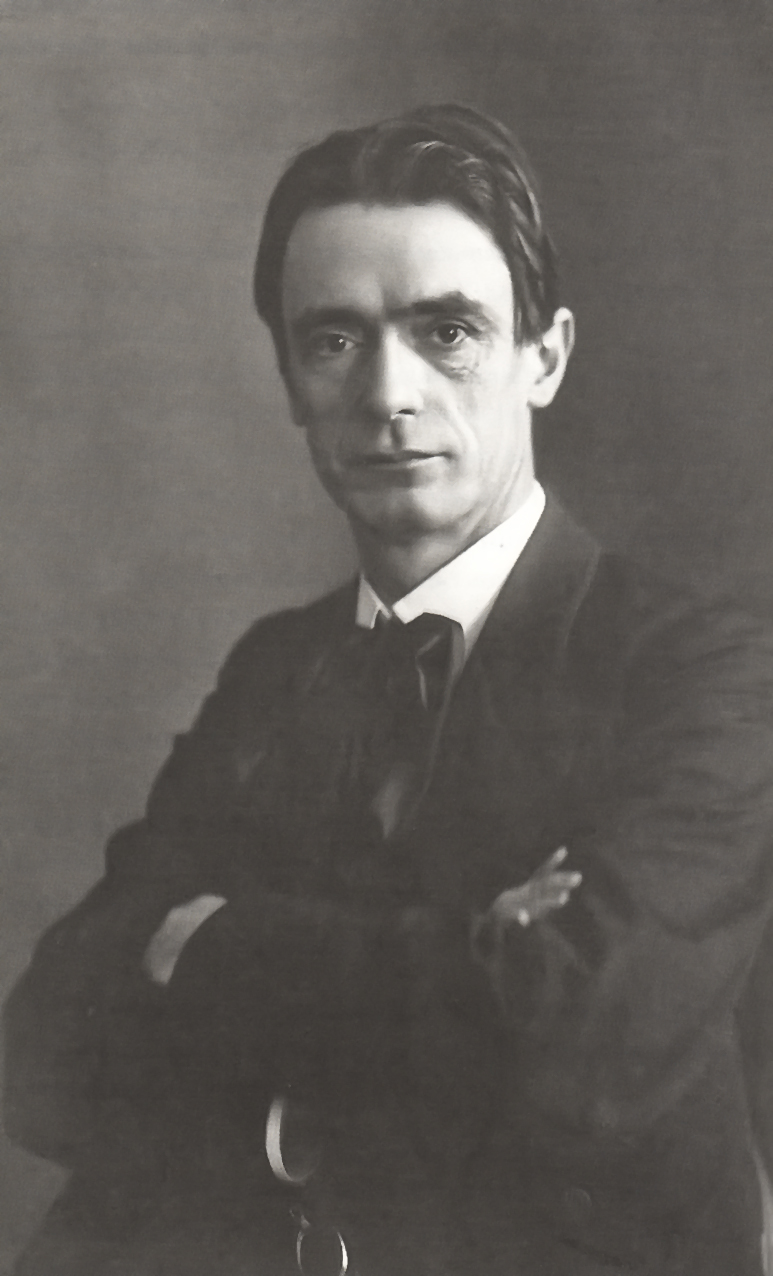
- Steiner c. 1905
- Born: Rudolf Joseph Lorenz Steiner; 27 February 1861; Murakirály, Kingdom of Hungary, Austrian Empire (now Donji Kraljevec, Croatia)
- Died: 30 March 1925 (aged 64); Dornach, Solothurn, Switzerland
- Education: Vienna Institute of Technology; University of Rostock (PhD, 1891)
- Spouses: Anna Eunicke (m. 1899; div. 1904) Marie Steiner-von Sivers (m. 1914)

Rudolf Joseph Lorenz Steiner (German: [ˈʃtaɪnɐ]; 27 or 25 February 1861 – 30 March 1925) was an Austrian New Age (Note: Sources for 'New Age') guru, (Note: Sources for 'guru') philosopher, occultist, social reformer, architect, esotericist, and claimed clairvoyant and speaker with the dead. Steiner gained initial recognition at the end of the nineteenth century as a literary critic and published works including The Philosophy of Freedom. At the beginning of the twentieth century he founded an esoteric spiritual movement, anthroposophy, with roots in German idealist philosophy and theosophy. His teachings are influenced by (Christian) Gnosticism (Note: Gnosticism meaning "In the broadest sense of the term this is any spiritual teaching that says that spiritual knowledge (Greek: gnosis) or wisdom (sophia) rather than doctrinal faith (pistis) or some ritual practice is the main route to supreme spiritual attainment.") or neognosticism. Many of his ideas are pseudoscientific. He was also prone to pseudohistory.

In the first, more philosophically oriented phase of this movement, Steiner attempted to find a synthesis between science and spirituality by developing what he termed "spiritual science", in which he sought to apply the clarity of thinking characteristic of Western philosophy to spiritual questions, intending to differentiate his approach from what he considered to be vaguer approaches to mysticism. In a second phase, beginning around 1907, he began working collaboratively in a variety of artistic media, including drama, dance and architecture, culminating in the building of the Goetheanum, a cultural centre to house all the arts. In the third phase of his work, beginning after World War I, Steiner worked on various ostensibly applied projects, including Waldorf education, biodynamic agriculture, and anthroposophical medicine.

Steiner advocated what has been described as ethical individualism, (Note: Ethical individualism is the opposite of ethical collectivism (meaning a moral code which is applicable to everyone). According to Aaron French, "He referred to this process as 'ethical individualism,' a concept which, for Steiner, implied that the ethical value of one's actions had to be decided for oneself, by the individual." According to Heiner Ullrich, "Thus with his 'ethical individualism' the early Steiner delivers a naturalistic doctrine of behavior, not a system of ethics which — as, for instance, Kant does with the categorical imperative — assists in providing an autonomous model for principles of moral behavior.") to which he later brought a more explicitly spiritual approach. He based his epistemology on Johann Wolfgang von Goethe's world view in which "thinking...is no more and no less an organ of perception than the eye or ear. Just as the eye perceives colours and the ear sounds, so thinking perceives ideas." A consistent thread that runs through his work is the goal of demonstrating that there are no limits to human knowledge.

== Biography ==
=== Overview ===
Almost all biographies of Steiner are hagiography, except the books by Gebhardt, Ullrich, and Zander.

=== Childhood and education ===
Steiner's father, Johann(es) Steiner (1829–1910), left a position as a gamekeeper in the service of the House of Hoyos in Geras, Austria, to marry one of the Hoyos family's housemaids - Franziska Blie (1834–1918), a marriage for which the count had refused his permission. Johann became a telegraph operator on the Southern Austrian Railway, and at the time of Rudolf's birth was stationed in now-Donji Kraljevec in the Međimurje (Muraköz) region of the Kingdom of Hungary, Austrian Empire. In the first two years of Rudolf's life, the family moved twice, first to Mödling, near Vienna, and then, through the promotion of his father to stationmaster, to Pottschach, located in the foothills of the eastern Austrian Alps in Lower Austria.

Steiner entered the village school, but following a disagreement between his father and the schoolmaster, he was briefly educated at home. In 1869, when Steiner was eight years old, the family moved to the village of Neudörfl and in October 1872 Steiner proceeded from the village school there to the realschule in Wiener Neustadt.

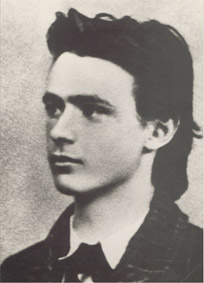
Rudolf Steiner, graduation photo from secondary school

In 1879, the family moved to Inzersdorf to enable Steiner to attend the Vienna Institute of Technology, where he enrolled in courses in mathematics, physics, chemistry, botany, zoology, and mineralogy and audited courses in literature and philosophy, on an academic scholarship from 1879 to 1883. He completed his studies and the requirements of the Ghega scholarship satisfactorily. In 1882, one of Steiner's teachers, Karl Julius Schröer, referred Steiner to Joseph Kürschner, chief editor of a new edition of Goethe's works. Kürschner asked Steiner to become the edition's natural science editor, a truly astonishing opportunity for a young student without any form of academic credentials or previous publications. Before attending the Vienna Institute of Technology, Steiner had studied Immanuel Kant, Fichte and F. W. J. Schelling. According to Gary Lachman, "the general consensus on Goethe's scientific musings as [sic] this point was that they were useless as science and dreary as literature; in truth, no one else wanted the job of editing them."

=== Early spiritual experiences ===
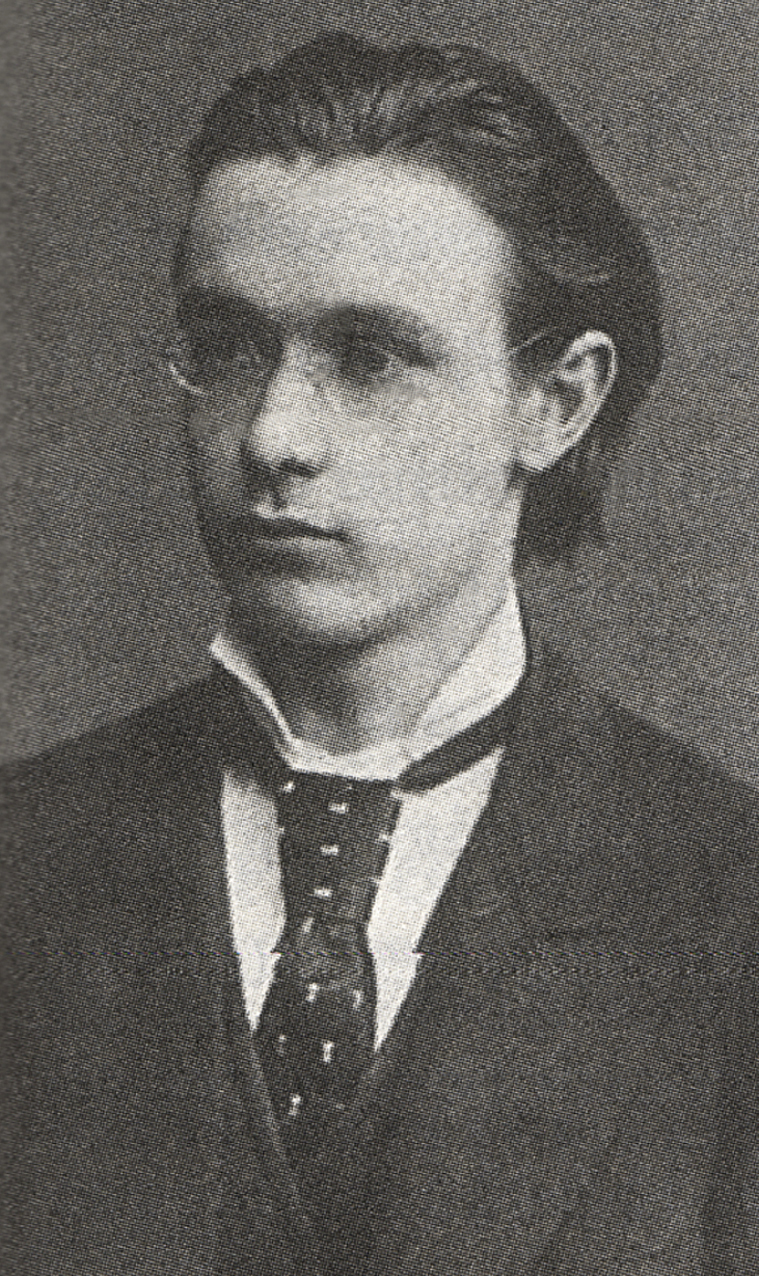
Rudolf Steiner as 21-year-old student (1882)

Steiner related that as a child, he felt "that one must carry the knowledge of the spiritual world within oneself after the fashion of geometry ... [for here] one is permitted to know something which the mind alone, through its own power, experiences. In this feeling I found the justification for the spiritual world that I experienced ... I confirmed for myself by means of geometry the feeling that I must speak of a world 'which is not seen'."

Steiner believed that at the age of 15 he had gained a complete understanding of the concept of time, which he considered to be the precondition of spiritual clairvoyance. At 21, on the train between his home village and Vienna, Steiner met an herb gatherer, Felix Kogutzki, who spoke about the spiritual world "as one who had his own experience therein".

=== Writer and philosopher ===
The young Steiner emerged as an individualist, positivist, and freethinker who was not afraid to refer to scandalous philosophers such as Max Stirner, Friedrich Nietzsche and Ernst Haeckel. His freethinking culminated in a contempt for religion and faith. He attributed almost pathological traits to Christianity. Steiner "was lecturing at many workers' colleges, and at the Giordano Bruno Union (a rationalist, anti-religious organisation) on the history of philosophy." Indeed, several authors see a change from the young this-worldly Steiner to the somewhat older other-worldly Steiner.

In 1888, as a result of his work for the Kürschner edition of Goethe's works, Steiner was invited to work as an editor at the Goethe archives in Weimar. Steiner remained with the archive until 1896. It was a low-paid and boring job. As well as the introductions for and commentaries to four volumes of Goethe's scientific writings, Steiner wrote two books about Goethe's philosophy: The Theory of Knowledge Implicit in Goethe's World-Conception (1886), which Steiner regarded as the epistemological foundation and justification for his later work, and Goethe's Conception of the World (1897). During this time he also collaborated in complete editions of the works of Arthur Schopenhauer and the writer Jean Paul and wrote numerous articles for various journals.

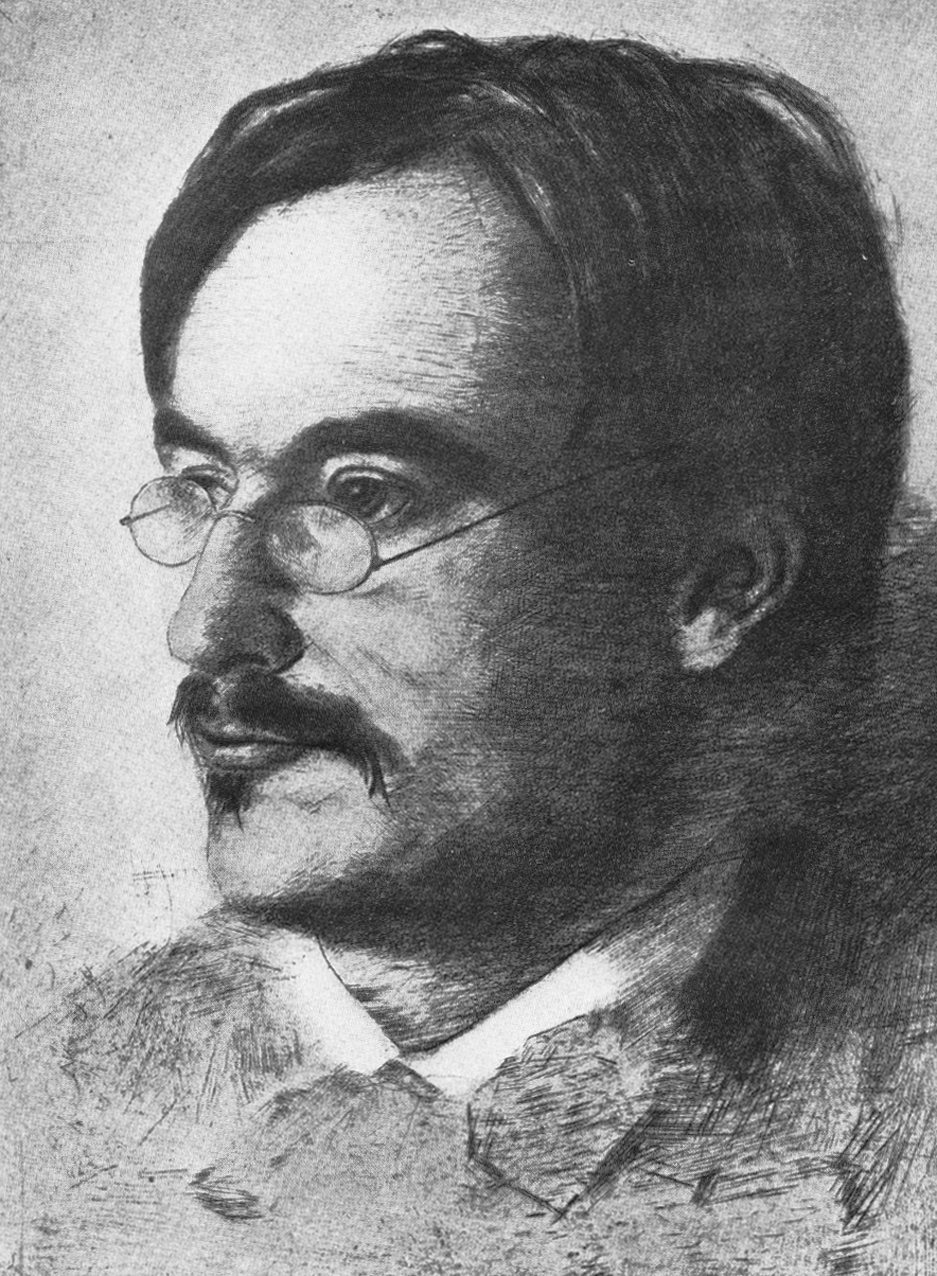
Rudolf Steiner around 1891–92, etching by Otto Fröhlich

In 1891, Steiner received a doctorate in philosophy at the University of Rostock for his dissertation discussing Fichte's concept of the ego, submitted to Heinrich von Stein, whose Seven Books of Platonism Steiner esteemed. Steiner's dissertation was later published in expanded form as Truth and Knowledge: Prelude to a Philosophy of Freedom, with a dedication to Eduard von Hartmann. Two years later, in 1894, he published Die Philosophie der Freiheit (The Philosophy of Freedom or The Philosophy of Spiritual Activity, the latter being Steiner's preferred English title), an exploration of epistemology and ethics that suggested a way for humans to become spiritually free beings. Steiner hoped that the book "would gain him a professorship", but the book was not well received. Steiner later spoke of this book as containing implicitly, in philosophical form, the entire content of what he later developed explicitly as anthroposophy.

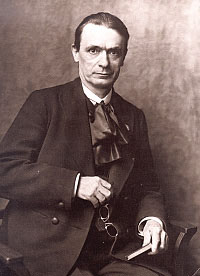
Steiner, c.1900

In 1896, Steiner declined an offer from Elisabeth Förster-Nietzsche to help organize the Nietzsche archive in Naumburg. Her brother, Friedrich Nietzsche, was by that time non compos mentis. "Hoping for a job (which, in fact, he did not get), Steiner accepted the invitation immediately." Förster-Nietzsche introduced Steiner into the presence of the catatonic philosopher; Steiner, deeply moved, subsequently wrote the book Friedrich Nietzsche, Fighter for Freedom. Steiner later related that:

My first acquaintance with Nietzsche's writings belongs to the year 1889. Previous to that I had never read a line of his. Upon the substance of my ideas as these find expression in The Philosophy of Spiritual Activity, Nietzsche's thought had not the least influence....Nietzsche's ideas of the 'eternal recurrence' and of 'Übermensch' remained long in my mind. For in these was reflected that which a personality must feel concerning the evolution and essential being of humanity when this personality is kept back from grasping the spiritual world by the restricted thought in the philosophy of nature characterizing the end of the 19th century....What attracted me particularly was that one could read Nietzsche without coming upon anything which strove to make the reader a 'dependent' of Nietzsche's.

In 1897, Steiner left the Weimar archives and moved to Berlin. He became part owner of, chief editor of, and an active contributor to the literary journal Magazin für Literatur, where he hoped to find a readership sympathetic to his philosophy. Many subscribers were alienated by Steiner's unpopular support of Émile Zola in the Dreyfus Affair and the journal lost more subscribers when Steiner published extracts from his correspondence with anarchist John Henry Mackay. Dissatisfaction with his editorial style eventually led to his departure from the magazine. In 1899, Steiner married Anna Eunicke; the couple separated several years later. Anna died in 1911. Steiner's marriage to Anna "was clearly a marriage of convenience".

Despite his fame as a teacher of esotericism, Steiner was culturally and academically isolated. About his work, The Philosophy of Freedom, Lachman wrote, "It's also a work of genius, and one suspects that Steiner's later occult reputation has prevented the book from receiving the kind of attention it deserves." He also wrote "Mainstream philosophy has as much use for Steiner today as it did a century ago, but his work has been picked up by more alternative thinkers, like William Irwin Thompson and Richard Tarnas."

Worse, he couldn't be a real philosopher either; his theosophy and anthroposophy and the Waldorf humanism in particular were considered pseudoscience or at best pedagogy, not a philosophical system. Steiner's credentials were not university-level professional work. [...] German mainstream scholarship called him an 'autodidact, with a poor teacher' and 'gypsy-intellectual.'^{144} Not uncommon for practitioners at the fringes of society, he was accused of class treason.

— Thorsten J. Pattberg (2012)

An Anthroposophist stated "However, knowing that the academic establishment would shun him, he nevertheless decided in 1902 to begin speaking openly about his spiritual observations."

=== Theosophical Society ===
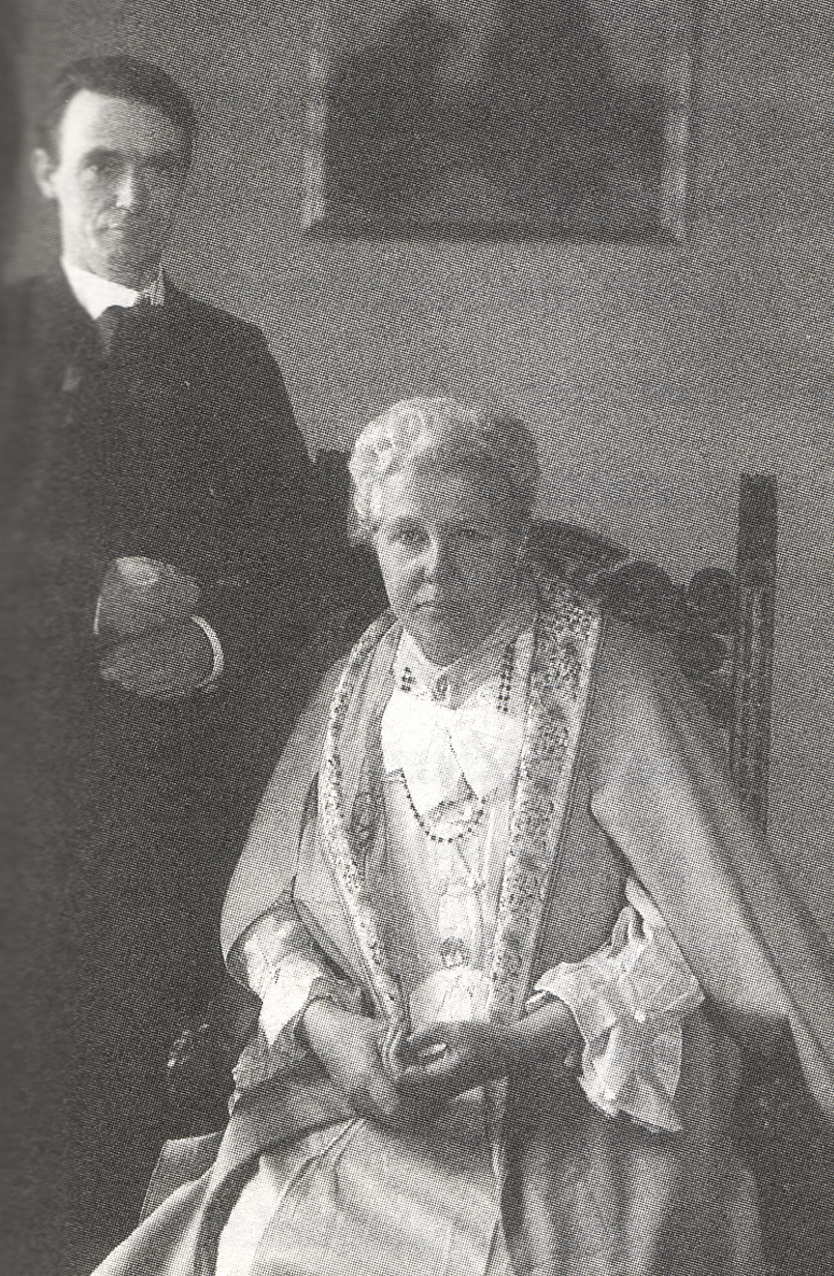
Rudolf Steiner in Munich with Annie Besant, leader of the Theosophical Society. Photo from 1907

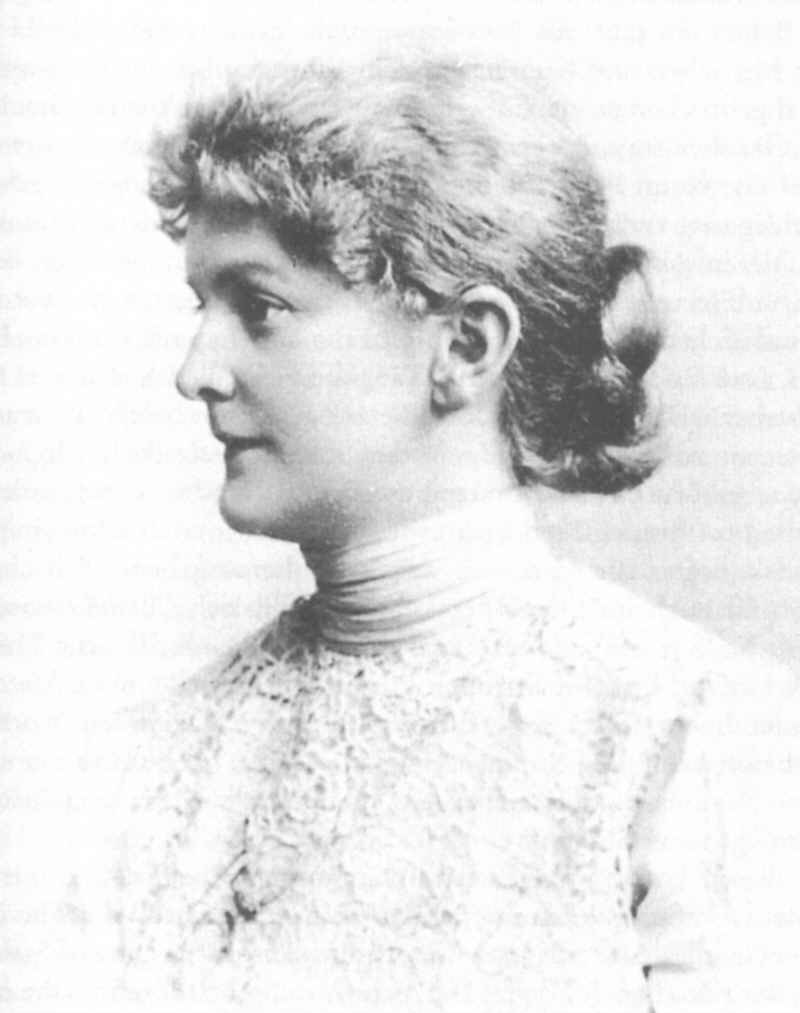
Marie Steiner, 1903

In 1899, Steiner published an article, "Goethe's Secret Revelation", discussing the esoteric nature of Goethe's fairy tale The Green Snake and the Beautiful Lily. This article led to an invitation by the Count and Countess Brockdorff to speak to a gathering of Theosophists on the subject of Nietzsche. Steiner continued speaking regularly to the members of the Theosophical Society, becoming the head of its newly constituted German section in 1902 without ever formally joining the society. It was also in connection with this society that Steiner met and worked with Marie von Sivers, who became his second wife in 1914. By 1904, Steiner was appointed by Annie Besant to be leader of the Theosophical Esoteric Society for Germany and Austria. In 1904, Eliza, the wife of Helmuth von Moltke the Younger, became one of his favourite scholars. Through Eliza, Steiner met Helmuth, who served as the Chief of the German General Staff from 1906 to 1914.

Anna Eunicke was not pleased that her husband, having previously the reputation of a liberal academic, now joined the cult of a charlatan. In contrast to mainstream Theosophy, Steiner sought to build a Western approach to spirituality based on the philosophical and mystical traditions of European culture. The German Section of the Theosophical Society grew rapidly under Steiner's leadership as he lectured throughout much of Europe on his spiritual science. During this period, Steiner maintained an original approach, replacing Madame Blavatsky's terminology with his own, and basing his spiritual research and teachings upon the Western esoteric and philosophical tradition. This and other differences, in particular Steiner's vocal rejection of Leadbeater and Besant's claim that Jiddu Krishnamurti was the vehicle of a new Maitreya, or world teacher, led to a formal split in 1912–13, when Steiner and the majority of members of the German section of the Theosophical Society broke off to form a new group, the Anthroposophical Society. Steiner took the name "Anthroposophy" from the title of a work of the Austrian philosopher Robert von Zimmermann, published in Vienna in 1856. Despite his departure from the Theosophical Society, Steiner maintained his interest in Theosophy throughout his life. According to James Webb, "Steiner joined the Theosophical Society in order to take it over."

According to Helmut Zander, Steiner's clairvoyant insights always developed according to the same pattern. He took revised texts from theosophical literature and then passed them off as his own higher insights. Because he did not want to be an occult storyteller, but a (spiritual) scientist, he adapted his reading, which he had seen supernaturally in the world's memory, to the current state of technology. When, for example, the Wright brothers began flying with gliders and eventually with motorized aircraft in 1903, Steiner transformed the ponderous gondola airships of his Atlantis story into airplanes with elevators and rudders in 1904. Mainstream historians have lambasted Steiner's accounts about Lemuria and Atlantis as pseudohistory. Zaleski and Zaleski wrote: "Steiner rewrote the history of the world, describing lost ages and unknown civilizations....He filled in this historical framework with teachings about reincarnation, karma, the astral planes, the Akashic Record, and other familiar elements in the European occultist's kit."

=== Anthroposophical Society and its cultural activities ===
The Anthroposophical Society grew rapidly. Fueled by a need to find an artistic home for their yearly conferences, which included performances of plays written by Edouard Schuré and Steiner, the decision was made to build a theater and organizational center. In 1913, construction began on the first Goetheanum building, in Dornach, Switzerland. The building, designed by Steiner, was built to a significant part by volunteers. Steiner moved from Berlin to Dornach in 1913 and lived there to the end of his life.

Steiner's lecture activity expanded enormously with the end of the war. Most importantly, from 1919 on Steiner began to work with other members of the society to found numerous practical institutions and activities, including the first Waldorf school, founded that year in Stuttgart, Germany. On New Year's Eve, 1922–1923, the Goetheanum burned to the ground; contemporary police reports indicate arson as the probable cause. Steiner immediately began work designing a second Goetheanum building – this time made of concrete instead of wood – which was completed in 1928, three years after his death.

At a "Foundation Meeting" for members held at the Dornach center during Christmas 1923, Steiner founded the School of Spiritual Science. This school, which was led by Steiner, initially had sections for general anthroposophy, education, medicine, performing arts (eurythmy, speech, drama and music), the literary arts and humanities, mathematics, astronomy, science, and visual arts. Later sections were added for the social sciences, youth and agriculture. The School of Spiritual Science included meditative exercises given by Steiner.

=== Political engagement and social agenda ===
Steiner became a well-known and controversial public figure during and after World War I. In response to the catastrophic situation in post-war Germany, he proposed extensive social reforms through the establishment of a Threefold Social Order in which the cultural, political and economic realms would be largely independent. Steiner argued that a fusion of the three realms had created the inflexibility that had led to catastrophes such as World War I. In connection with this, he promoted a radical solution in the disputed area of Upper Silesia, claimed by both Poland and Germany. His suggestion that this area be granted at least provisional independence led through a misunderstanding to his being publicly accused of being a traitor to Germany. The attack was based upon the misunderstanding that Steiner would have stated that Germans have to abstain from the referendum deciding the fate of that piece of land. He promptly informed the newspaper that that was not his intention. He originally meant that independence allowed that region to remain under the German sphere of influence.

Steiner channeled messages from the spirit of Helmuth von Moltke the Younger. Steiner had conversations with von Moltke, after von Moltke's death. Steiner opposed Wilson's proposal to create new European nations based around ethnic groups, which he saw as opening the door to rampant nationalism. Steiner proposed, as an alternative:

'social territories' with democratic institutions that were accessible to all inhabitants of a territory whatever their origin while the needs of the various ethnicities would be met by independent cultural institutions.

Two Marxist–Leninist German politicians say Steiner was racist and reactionary.

=== Attacks, illness, and death ===
The National Socialist German Workers Party gained strength in Germany after the First World War. In 1919, a political theorist of this movement, Dietrich Eckart, attacked Steiner and suggested that he was a Jew. In 1921, Adolf Hitler attacked Steiner on many fronts, including accusations that he was a tool of the Jews. That same year, Steiner warned against the disastrous effects it would have for Central Europe if the National Socialists came to power. In 1922 a lecture Steiner was giving in Munich was disrupted when stink bombs were let off and the lights switched out, while people rushed the stage apparently attempting to attack Steiner, who exited safely through a back door. Unable to guarantee his safety, Steiner's agents cancelled his next lecture tour. The 1923 Beer Hall Putsch in Munich led Steiner to give up his residence in Berlin, saying that if those responsible for the attempted coup (Hitler's Nazi party) came to power in Germany, it would no longer be possible for him to enter the country. According to Lachman, "Practically everybody hated him: Catholics, Protestants, Marxists, proto-Nazis, not to mention other esotericists."

From 1923 on, Steiner showed signs of increasing frailness and illness. He nonetheless continued to lecture widely, and even to travel; especially towards the end of this time, he was often giving two, three or even four lectures daily for courses taking place concurrently. Many of these lectures focused on practical areas of life such as education. Increasingly ill, he held his last lecture in late September 1924. He continued work on his autobiography during the last months of his life; he died at Dornach on 30 March 1925.

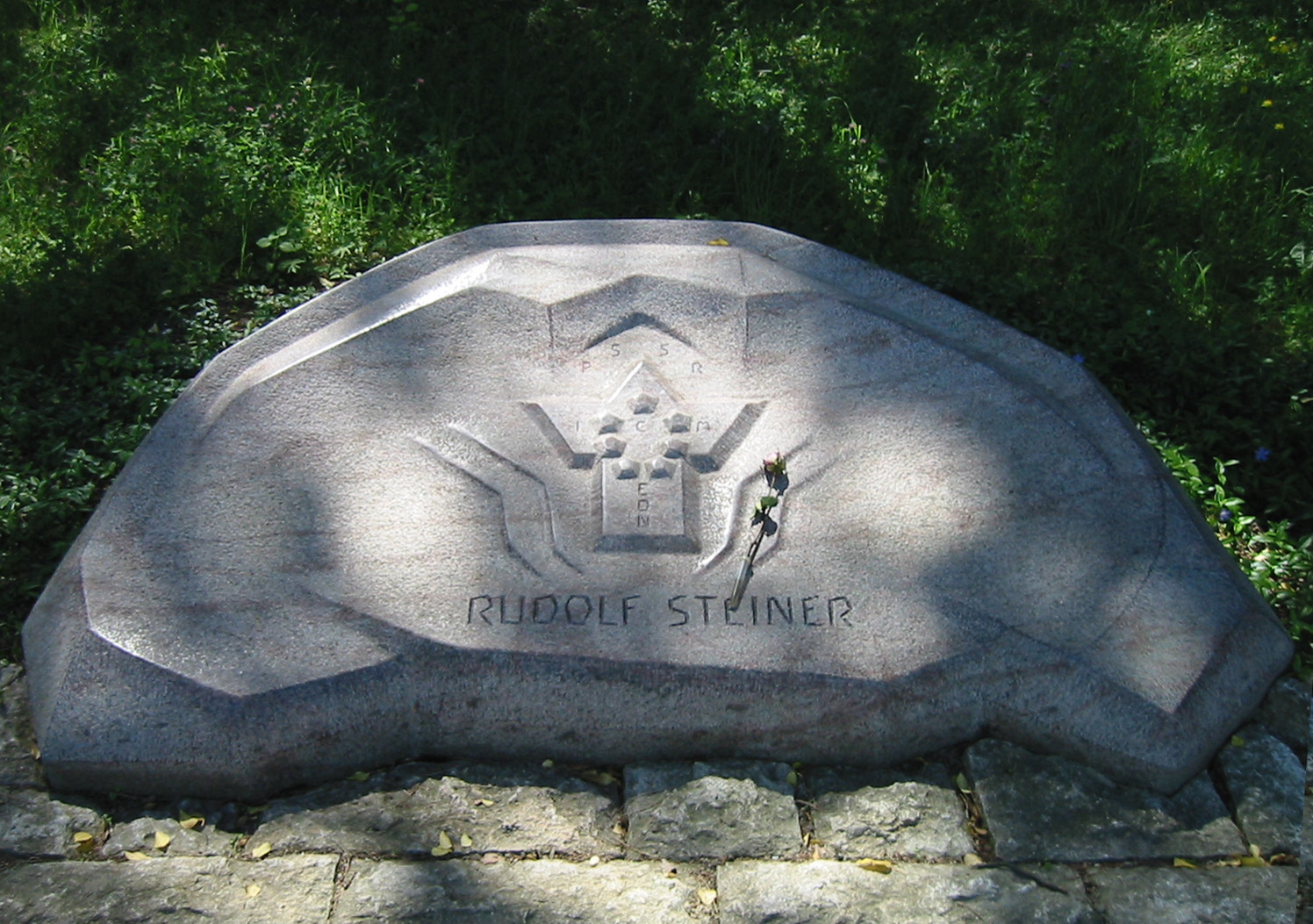
Steiner's gravestone at the Goetheanum

=== Spiritual research ===
Steiner first began speaking publicly about spiritual experiences and phenomena in his 1899 lectures to the Theosophical Society. By 1901 he had begun to write about spiritual topics, initially in the form of discussions of historical figures such as the mystics of the Middle Ages. By 1904 he was expressing his own understanding of these themes in his essays and books, while continuing to refer to a wide variety of historical sources.

A world of spiritual perception is discussed in a number of writings which I have published since this book appeared. The Philosophy of Freedom forms the philosophical basis for these later writings. For it tries to show that the experience of thinking, rightly understood, is in fact an experience of spirit.
(Steiner, Philosophy of Freedom, Consequences of Monism)

Steiner aimed to apply his training in mathematics, science, and philosophy to produce rigorous, verifiable presentations of those experiences. He believed that through freely chosen ethical disciplines and meditative training, anyone could develop the ability to experience the spiritual world, including the higher nature of oneself and others. Steiner believed that such discipline and training would help a person to become a more moral, creative and free individual – free in the sense of being capable of actions motivated solely by love. His philosophical ideas were affected by Franz Brentano, with whom he had studied, as well as by Fichte, Hegel, Schelling, and Goethe's phenomenological approach to science.

Steiner used the word Geisteswissenschaft (from Geist = mind or spirit, Wissenschaft = science), a term originally coined by Wilhelm Dilthey as a descriptor of the humanities, in a novel way, to describe a systematic ("scientific") approach to spirituality. Steiner used the term Geisteswissenschaft, generally translated into English as "spiritual science," to describe a discipline treating the spirit as something actual and real, starting from the premise that it is possible for human beings to penetrate behind what is sense-perceptible. He proposed that psychology, history, and the humanities generally were based on the direct grasp of an ideal reality, and required close attention to the particular period and culture which provided the distinctive character of religious qualities in the course of the evolution of consciousness. In contrast to William James' pragmatic approach to religious and psychic experience, which emphasized its idiosyncratic character, Steiner focused on ways such experience can be rendered more intelligible and integrated into human life.

Steiner proposed that an understanding of reincarnation and karma was necessary to understand psychology and that the form of external nature would be more comprehensible as a result of insight into the course of karma in the evolution of humanity. Beginning in 1910, he described aspects of karma relating to health, natural phenomena and free will, taking the position that a person is not bound by his or her karma, but can transcend this through actively taking hold of one's own nature and destiny. In an extensive series of lectures from February to September 1924, Steiner presented further research on successive reincarnations of various individuals and described the techniques he used for karma research.

An author stated that Steiner was a guru. A psychiatrist agrees. Other authors agree. (Note: Authors who agree he was a guru) Moffitt called Steiner a "great mitteleuropäische occultist guru". Two authors stated "Rudolf Steiner—guru only insofar as that was one of the duties he imposed on himself as a universal genius and world redeemer". While Colin Wilson dismissed Steiner as a "Charlatan Messiah/demented messiah". Wilson stated "Steiner was one of the most successful 'messiahs' that Europe had seen since Sabbatai Zevi." As of 2022, during the past 100 years, Anthroposophists constantly denied that Steiner is or was a guru.

== Breadth of activity ==
After the First World War, Steiner became active in a wide variety of cultural contexts. He founded a number of schools, the first of which was known as the Waldorf school, which later evolved into a worldwide school network. He also founded a system of organic agriculture, now known as biodynamic agriculture, which was one of the first forms of modern organic farming. His work in medicine is based in pseudoscience and occult ideas. Even though his medical ideas led to the development of a broad range of complementary medications and supportive artistic and biographic therapies, they are considered ineffective by the medical community. Numerous homes for children and adults with developmental disabilities based on his work (including those of the Camphill movement) are found in Africa, Europe, and North America. His paintings and drawings influenced Joseph Beuys and other modern artists. His two Goetheanum buildings are considered significant examples of modern architecture, (Note: Sources for the Goetheanums) and other anthroposophical architects have contributed thousands of buildings to the modern scene.

Steiner's literary estate is broad. Steiner's writings, published in about forty volumes, include books, essays, four plays ('mystery dramas'), mantric verse, and an autobiography. His collected lectures, making up another approximately 300 volumes, discuss a wide range of themes. Steiner's drawings, chiefly illustrations done on blackboards during his lectures, are collected in a separate series of 28 volumes. Many publications have covered his architectural legacy and sculptural work.

Steiner has speculated about creating artificial life (and maybe about artificial intelligence), but such speculations were by no means a novelty. Steiner's approach to technology was similar to Martin Heidegger's. Both were no Luddites. Steiner's speculations about the collusion between electrical machinery and political control were daring.

=== Education ===
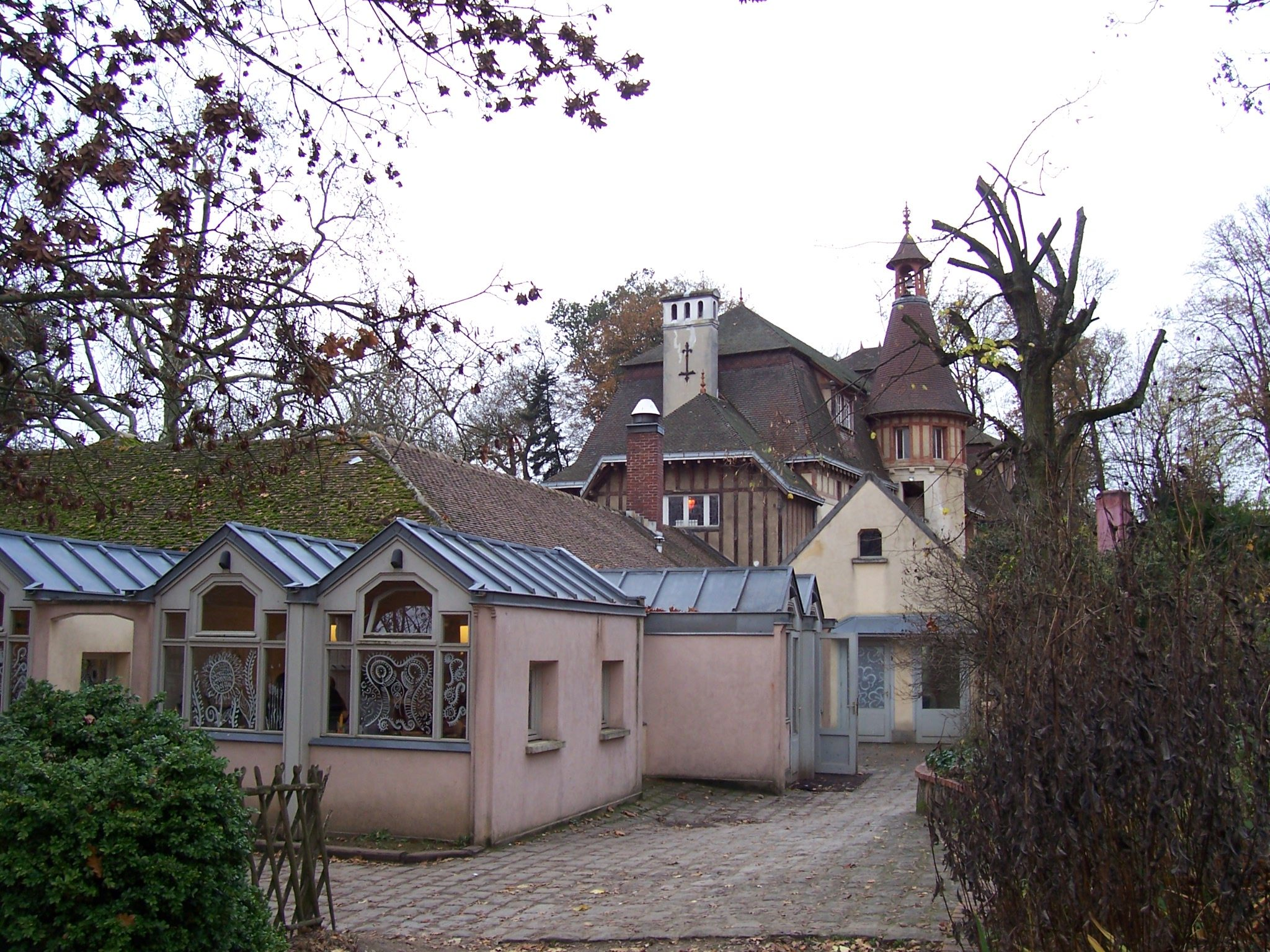
The Waldorf school in Verrières-le-Buisson (France)

As a young man, Steiner was a private tutor and a lecturer on history for the Berlin Arbeiterbildungsschule, an educational initiative for working class adults. Soon thereafter, he began to articulate his ideas on education in public lectures, culminating in a 1907 essay on The Education of the Child in which he described the major phases of child development which formed the foundation of his approach to education. His conception of education was influenced by the Herbartian pedagogy prominent in Europe during the late nineteenth century, though Steiner criticized Herbart for not sufficiently recognizing the importance of educating the will and feelings as well as the intellect.

In 1919, Emil Molt invited him to lecture to his workers at the Waldorf-Astoria cigarette factory in Stuttgart. Out of these lectures came the first Waldorf School. In 1922, Steiner presented these ideas at a conference called for this purpose in Oxford by Professor Millicent Mackenzie. He subsequently presented a teacher training course at Torquay in 1924 at an Anthroposophy Summer School organised by Eleanor Merry. The Oxford Conference and the Torquay teacher training led to the founding of the first Waldorf schools in Britain. During Steiner's lifetime, schools based on his educational principles were also founded in Hamburg, Essen, The Hague and London; there are now more than 1000 Waldorf schools worldwide.

Benjamin Lazier calls Steiner a "maverick educator".

Waldorf schools consider critical thinking unsuitable for children, while Steiner considered it unsuitable for spiritual people.

=== Biodynamic agriculture ===
In 1924, a group of farmers concerned about the future of agriculture requested Steiner's help. Steiner responded with a lecture series on an ecological and sustainable approach to agriculture that increased soil fertility without the use of chemical fertilizers and pesticides. Steiner's agricultural ideas promptly spread and were put into practice internationally and biodynamic agriculture is now practiced in Europe, North America, South America, Africa, Asia and Australasia.

"Steiner's 'biodynamic agriculture' based on 'restoring the quasi-mystical relationship between earth and the cosmos' was widely accepted in the Third Reich."

A central aspect of biodynamics is that the farm as a whole is seen as an organism, and therefore should be a largely self-sustaining system, producing its own manure and animal feed. Plant or animal disease is seen as a symptom of problems in the whole organism. Steiner also suggested timing such agricultural activities as sowing, weeding, and harvesting to utilize the influences on plant growth of the moon and planets; and the application of natural materials prepared in specific ways to the soil, compost, and crops, with the intention of engaging non-physical beings and elemental forces. He encouraged his listeners to verify such suggestions empirically, as he had not yet done.

In a 2002 newspaper editorial, Peter Treue, agricultural researcher at the University of Kiel, characterized biodynamics as pseudoscience and argued that similar or equal results can be obtained using standard organic farming principles. He wrote that some biodynamic preparations more resemble alchemy or magic akin to geomancy.

=== Anthroposophical medicine ===
From the late 1910s, Steiner was working with doctors to create a new approach to medicine. In 1921, pharmacists and physicians gathered under Steiner's guidance to create a pharmaceutical company called Weleda which now distributes naturopathic medical and beauty products worldwide. At around the same time, Dr. Ita Wegman founded a first anthroposophic medical clinic (now the Ita Wegman Clinic) in Arlesheim. Anthroposophic medicine is practiced in some 80 countries. It is a form of alternative medicine based on pseudoscientific and occult notions. Joseph A. Schwarcz regards Steiner as a quack.

Steiner's ideas on diets could have led to better health outcomes than common nutrition at the time, although the theoretical backing, which relied on intuition, is now recognized as incorrect.

=== Social reform ===
For a period after World War I, Steiner was active as a lecturer on social reform. A petition expressing his basic social ideas was widely circulated and signed by many cultural figures of the day, including Hermann Hesse.

In Steiner's chief book on social reform, Toward Social Renewal, he suggested that the cultural, political and economic spheres of society need to work together as consciously cooperating yet independent entities, each with a particular task: political institutions should be democratic, establish political equality and protect human rights; cultural institutions should nurture the free and unhindered development of science, art, education and religion; and economic institutions should enable producers, distributors, and consumers to cooperate voluntarily to provide efficiently for society's needs. He saw this division of responsibility as a vital task which would take up consciously the historical trend toward the mutual independence of these three realms. Steiner also gave suggestions for many specific social reforms. Steiner proposed that societal well-being fundamentally depends upon a relationship of mutuality between the individuals and the community as a whole:

The well-being of a community of people working together will be the greater, the less the individual claims for himself the proceeds of his work, i.e. the more of these proceeds he makes over to his fellow-workers, the more his own needs are satisfied, not out of his own work but out of the work done by others.

— Steiner, The Fundamental Social Law

He expressed another aspect of this in the following motto:

The healthy social life is found
When in the mirror of each human soul
The whole community finds its reflection,
And when in the community
The virtue of each one is living.

— Steiner, The Fundamental Social Law

According to Cees Leijenhorst, "Steiner outlined his vision of a new political and social philosophy that avoids the two extremes of capitalism and socialism." According to Egil Asprem, "Steiner's teachings had a clear authoritarian ring, and developed a rather crass polemic against 'materialism', 'liberalism', and cultural 'degeneration'. [...] For example, anthroposophical medicine was developed to contrast with the 'materialistic' (and hence 'degenerate') medicine of the establishment." The Social Threefolding has been called a "nebulous scheme". Steiner pleaded for a hegemonic spiritual elite. "Steiner's political suggestions seems hopelessly unrealistic... moonshine..."

=== Architecture and visual arts ===
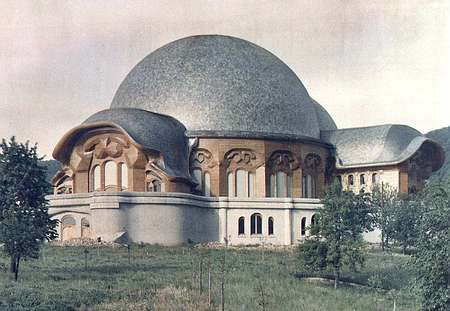
First Goetheanum

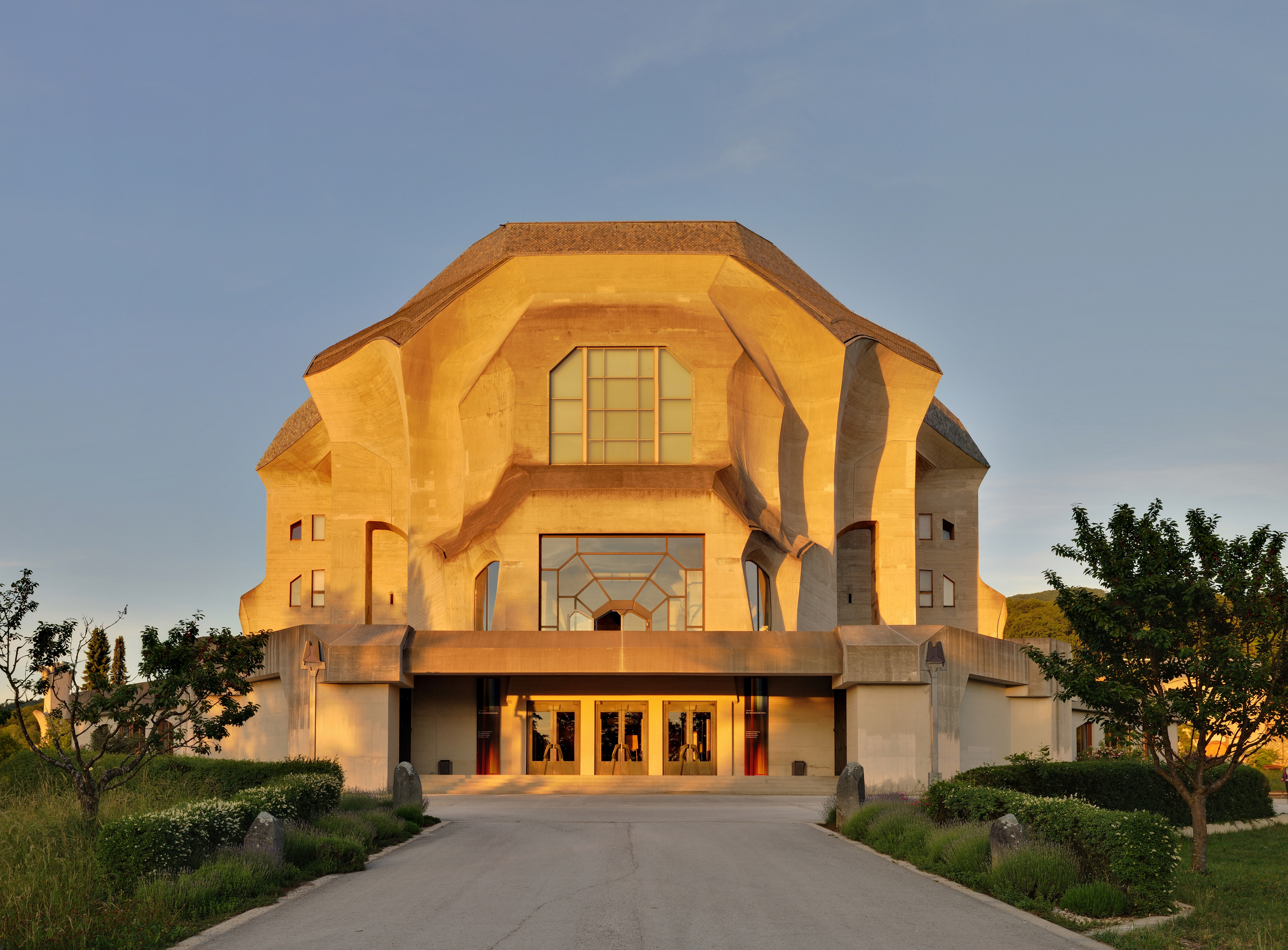
Second Goetheanum

Detail of The Representative of Humanity

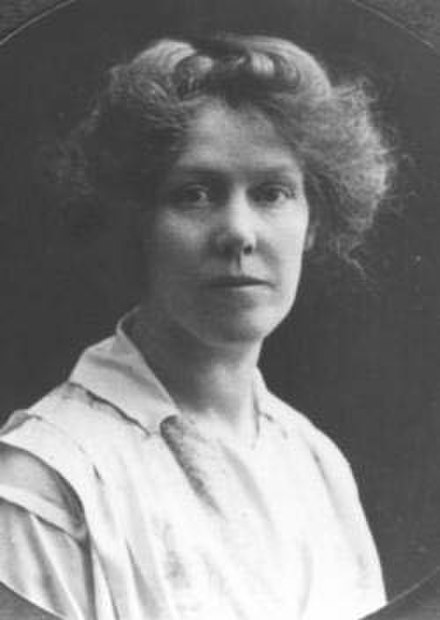
English sculptor Edith Maryon belonged to the innermost circle of founders of anthroposophy and was appointed to head the Section of Sculptural Arts at the Goetheanum.

Steiner designed 17 buildings, including the First and Second Goetheanums. These two buildings, built in Dornach, Switzerland, were intended to house significant theater spaces as well as a "school for spiritual science". Three of Steiner's buildings have been listed amongst the most significant works of modern architecture.

His primary sculptural work is The Representative of Humanity (1922), a nine-meter high wood sculpture executed as a joint project with the sculptor Edith Maryon. This was intended to be placed in the first Goetheanum. It shows a central human figure, the "Representative of Humanity," holding a balance between opposing tendencies of expansion and contraction personified as the beings of Lucifer and Ahriman. It was intended to show, in conscious contrast to Michelangelo's Last Judgment, Christ as mute and impersonal such that the beings that approach him must judge themselves. The sculpture is now on permanent display at the Goetheanum.

Steiner's blackboard drawings were unique at the time and almost certainly not originally intended as art works. Joseph Beuys' work, itself heavily influenced by Steiner, has led to the modern understanding of Steiner's drawings as artistic objects.

=== Performing arts ===
Steiner wrote four mystery plays between 1909 and 1913: The Portal of Initiation, The Souls' Probation, The Guardian of the Threshold and The Soul's Awakening, modeled on the esoteric dramas of Edouard Schuré, Maurice Maeterlinck, and Johann Wolfgang von Goethe. Steiner's plays continue to be performed by anthroposophical groups in various countries, most notably (in the original German) in Dornach, Switzerland and (in English translation) in Spring Valley, New York and in Stroud and Stourbridge in the U.K.

In collaboration with Marie von Sivers, Steiner also founded a new approach to acting, storytelling, and the recitation of poetry. His last public lecture course, given in 1924, was on speech and drama. The Russian actor, director, and acting coach Michael Chekhov based significant aspects of his method of acting on Steiner's work.

Together with Marie von Sivers, Rudolf Steiner also developed the art of eurythmy, sometimes referred to as "visible speech and song". According to the principles of eurythmy, there are archetypal movements or gestures that correspond to every aspect of speech – the sounds (or phonemes), the rhythms, and the grammatical function – to every "soul quality" – joy, despair, tenderness, etc. – and to every aspect of music – tones, intervals, rhythms, and harmonies.

=== Esoteric schools ===
Steiner was founder and leader of the following:

- His independent Esoteric School of the Theosophical Society, founded in 1904. This school continued after the break with Theosophy but was disbanded at the start of World War I.
- A lodge called Mystica Aeterna within the Masonic Order of Memphis and Mizraim, which Steiner led from 1906 until around 1914. Steiner added to the Masonic rite a number of Rosicrucian references.
- The School of Spiritual Science of the Anthroposophical Society, founded in 1923 as a further development of his earlier Esoteric School. This was originally constituted with a general section and seven specialized sections for education, literature, performing arts, natural sciences, medicine, visual arts, and astronomy. Steiner gave members of the School the first Lesson for guidance into the esoteric work in February 1924. Though Steiner intended to develop three "classes" of this school, only the first of these was developed in his lifetime (and continues today). An authentic text of the written records on which the teaching of the First Class was based was published in 1992.

The Esoteric School of the Anthroposophical Society originated, directly and indirectly, from "the many pansophical and occult groups belonging to high-grade Masonry", going through the Theosophical Society and Ordo Templi Orientis. Steiner had the Masonic degrees 33 and 95. Besides being a member of the OTO, Steiner was the German Deputy Grand Master of the Rite of Memphis-Misraim. Steiner quickly distanced himself from Theodor Reuss, OTO leader who had allowed him access to Freemasonry, and such association was unfortunate due to public disclosures that the OTO practiced sexual magic. Steiner's lodge taught Kama Sutra and The Perfumed Garden.

== Philosophical ideas ==
=== Goethean science ===
In his commentaries on Goethe's scientific works, written between 1884 and 1897, Steiner presented Goethe's approach to science as essentially phenomenological in nature, rather than theory or model-based. He developed this conception further in several books, The Theory of Knowledge Implicit in Goethe's World-Conception (1886) and Goethe's Conception of the World (1897), particularly emphasizing the transformation in Goethe's approach from the physical sciences, where experiment played the primary role, to plant biology, where both accurate perception and imagination were required to find the biological archetypes (Urpflanze). He postulated that Goethe had sought, but been unable to fully find, the further transformation in scientific thinking necessary to properly interpret and understand the animal kingdom. Steiner emphasized the role of evolutionary thinking in Goethe's discovery of the intermaxillary bone in human beings; Goethe expected human anatomy to be an evolutionary transformation of animal anatomy. Steiner defended Goethe's qualitative description of color as arising synthetically from the polarity of light and darkness, in contrast to Newton's particle-based and analytic conception.

Particular organic forms can be evolved only from universal types, and every organic entity we experience must coincide with some one of these derivative forms of the type. Here the evolutionary method must replace the method of proof. We aim not to show that external conditions act upon one another in a certain way and thereby bring about a definite result, but that a particular form has developed under definite external conditions out of the type. This is the radical difference between inorganic and organic science.

— Rudolf Steiner, The Theory of Knowledge Implicit in Goethe's World Conception, Chapter XVI, "Organic Nature"

As noted by Hammer, this means that anthroposophy harbors extensive empirical claims on "the most diverse subjects: matters normally defined as belonging to the domain of science, yet made immune to scientific critique because of Steiner's radical dichotomy—agronomy, chemistry, pharmacology, physiology, anatomy, developmental psychology, astronomy, physics etc." (Hammer 2004, 227).

— Hansson 2022

A variety of authors have termed Goethean science pseudoscience. According to Dan Dugan, Steiner was a champion of the following pseudoscientific claims:

1. Goethe's Theory of Colours;
2. "he called relativity 'brilliant nonsense'";
3. "he taught that the motions of the planets were caused by the relationships of the spiritual beings that inhabited them";
4. vitalism;
5. doubting germ theory;
6. non-standard approach to physiological systems, including claiming that the heart is not a pump.

According to Rudolf Steiner, mainstream science is Ahrimanic. Steiner lambasted especially sociology and economics. "[H]e demonised the world promoted by scientific rationalism."

Steiner is turning the argument of 'pseudo-science' around and criticizes those systems of knowledge that do not open themselves to the existence of spiritual and supernatural dimensions of reality as "alleged science" ("vermeintliche Wissenschaft").

— Kocku von Stuckrad (2014)

Steiner had a geocentric view. He deplored the Copernican system.

=== Knowledge and freedom ===
Steiner approached the philosophical questions of knowledge and freedom in two stages. In his dissertation, published in expanded form in 1892 as Truth and Knowledge, Steiner suggests that there is an inconsistency between Kant's philosophy, which posits that all knowledge is a representation of an essential verity inaccessible to human consciousness, and modern science, which assumes that all influences can be found in the sensory and mental world to which we have access. Steiner considered Kant's philosophy of an inaccessible beyond ("Jenseits-Philosophy") a stumbling block in achieving a satisfying philosophical viewpoint.

Steiner postulates that the world is essentially an indivisible unity, but that our consciousness divides it into the sense-perceptible appearance, on the one hand, and the formal nature accessible to our thinking, on the other. He sees in thinking itself an element that can be strengthened and deepened sufficiently to penetrate all that our senses do not reveal to us. Steiner thus considered what appears to human experience as a division between the spiritual and natural worlds to be a conditioned result of the structure of our consciousness, which separates perception and thinking. These two faculties give us not two worlds, but two complementary views of the same world; neither has primacy and the two together are necessary and sufficient to arrive at a complete understanding of the world. In thinking about perception (the path of natural science) and perceiving the process of thinking (the path of spiritual training), it is possible to discover a hidden inner unity between the two poles of our experience. Truth, for Steiner, is paradoxically both an objective discovery and yet "a free creation of the human spirit, that never would exist at all if we did not generate it ourselves. The task of understanding is not to replicate in conceptual form something that already exists, but rather to create a wholly new realm, that together with the world given to our senses constitutes the fullness of reality."

In The Philosophy of Freedom, Steiner further explores potentials within thinking: freedom, he suggests, can only be approached gradually with the aid of the creative activity of thinking. Thinking can be a free deed; in addition, it can liberate our will from its subservience to our instincts and drives. Free deeds, he suggests, are those for which we are fully conscious of the motive for our action; freedom is the spiritual activity of penetrating with consciousness our own nature and that of the world, and the real activity of acting in full consciousness. This includes overcoming influences of both heredity and environment: "To be free is to be capable of thinking one's own thoughts – not the thoughts merely of the body, or of society, but thoughts generated by one's deepest, most original, most essential and spiritual self, one's individuality." "Steiner was a moral individualist". Steiner affirms Darwin's and Haeckel's evolutionary perspectives but extended this beyond its materialistic consequences; he sees human consciousness, indeed, all human culture, as a product of natural evolution that transcends itself. For Steiner, nature becomes self-conscious in the human being. Steiner's description of the nature of human consciousness thus closely parallels that of Solovyov.

=== Spiritual science ===
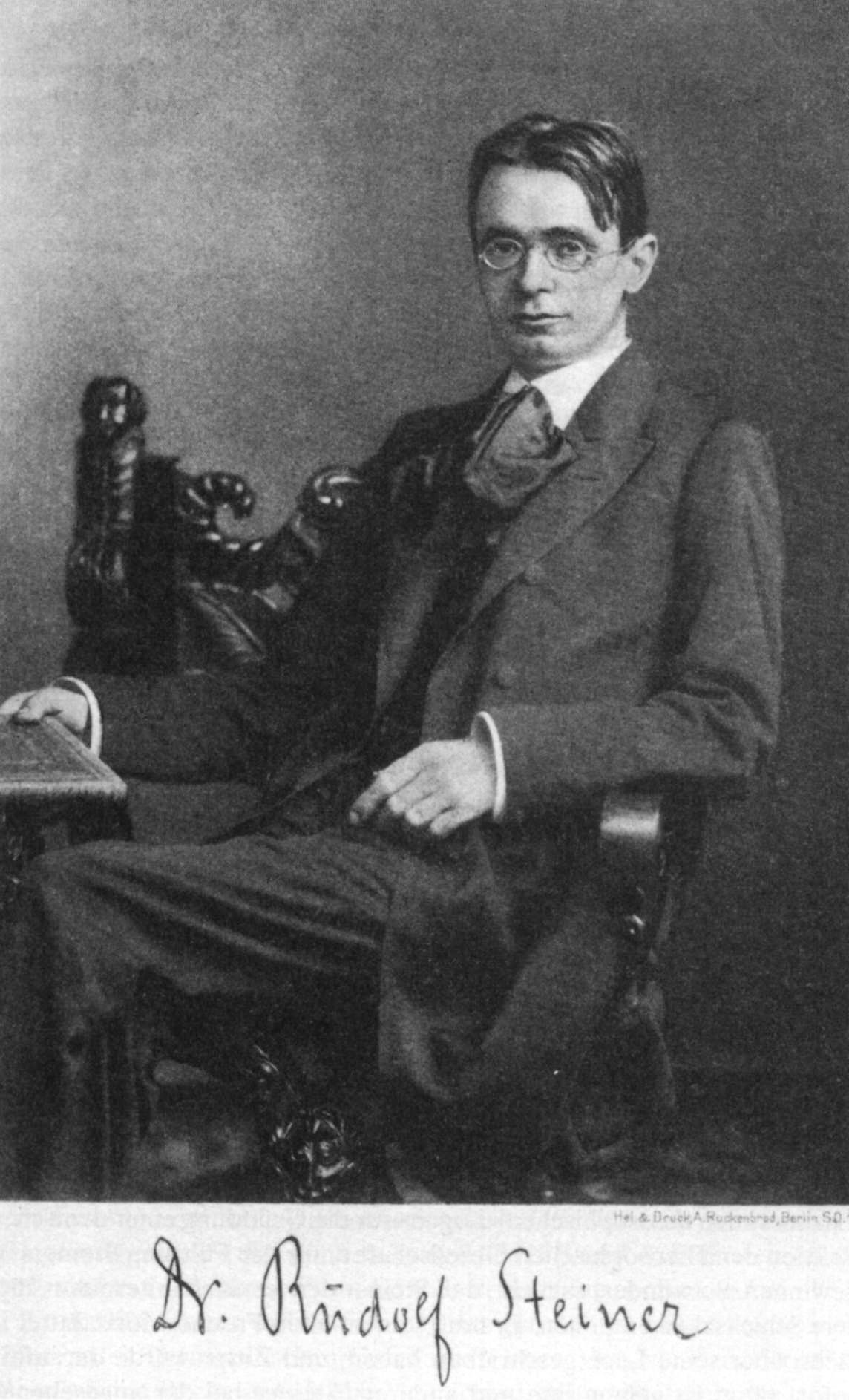
Rudolf Steiner 1900

In his earliest works, Steiner already spoke of the "natural and spiritual worlds" as a unity. From 1900 on, he began lecturing about concrete details of the spiritual world(s), culminating in the publication in 1904 of the first of several systematic presentations, his Theosophy: An Introduction to the Spiritual Processes in Human Life and in the Cosmos. As a starting point for the book Steiner took a quotation from Goethe, describing the method of natural scientific observation, while in the Preface he made clear that the line of thought taken in this book led to the same goal as that in his earlier work, The Philosophy of Freedom.

In the years 1903–1908 Steiner maintained the magazine Lucifer-Gnosis and published in it essays on topics such as initiation, reincarnation and karma, and knowledge of the supernatural world. Some of these were later collected and published as books, such as How to Know Higher Worlds (1904–05) and Cosmic Memory. The book An Outline of Esoteric Science was published in 1910. Important themes include:

- the human being as body, soul and spirit;
- the path of spiritual development;
- spiritual influences on world-evolution and history; and
- reincarnation and karma.

Steiner emphasized that there is an objective natural and spiritual world that can be known, and that perceptions of the spiritual world and incorporeal beings are, under conditions of training comparable to that required for the natural sciences, including self-discipline, replicable by multiple observers. It is on this basis that spiritual science is possible, with radically different epistemological foundations than those of natural science. He believed that natural science was correct in its methods but one-sided for exclusively focusing on sensory phenomena, while mysticism was vague in its methods, though seeking to explore the inner and spiritual life. Anthroposophy was meant to apply the systematic methods of the former to the content of the latter

For Steiner, the cosmos is permeated and continually transformed by the creative activity of non-physical processes and spiritual beings. For the human being to become conscious of the objective reality of these processes and beings, it is necessary to creatively enact and reenact, within, their creative activity. Thus objective spiritual knowledge always entails creative inner activity. Steiner articulated three stages of any creative deed:

- Moral intuition: the ability to discover or, preferably, develop valid ethical principles;
- Moral imagination: the imaginative transformation of such principles into a concrete intention applicable to the particular situation (situational ethics); and
- Moral technique: the realization of the intended transformation, depending on a mastery of practical skills.

Steiner termed his work from this period onwards Anthroposophy. He emphasized that the spiritual path he articulated builds upon and supports individual freedom and independent judgment; for the results of spiritual research to be appropriately presented in a modern context they must be in a form accessible to logical understanding, so that those who do not have access to the spiritual experiences underlying anthroposophical research can make independent evaluations of the latter's results. Spiritual training is to support what Steiner considered the overall purpose of human evolution, the development of the mutually interdependent qualities of love and freedom.

The epistemology offered by anthroposophy represents a regression to pre-scientific modes of thought. Ullrich stated that Steiner's epistemology is "rationalized mysticism". Others stated that anthroposophy is "an arcane pseudoscience based on medieval mysticism". Another author stated that it is "Rudolf Steiner's innovative doctrine that combined fashionable mysticism with no less fashionable pseudoscience." A French author wrote that Anthroposophy "is a clever mix of pseudoscience, esotericism and mysticism". Steiner claimed he did astral projection, and that he was a clairvoyant.

=== Steiner and Christianity ===
Steiner appreciated the ritual of the mass he experienced while serving as an altar boy from school age until he was ten years old, and this experience remained memorable for him as a genuinely spiritual one, contrasting with his irreligious family life. As a young adult, Steiner had no formal connection to organized religion. In 1899, he experienced what he described as a life-transforming inner encounter with the being of Christ. Steiner was then 38, and the experience of meeting Christ occurred after a tremendous inner struggle. To use Steiner's own words, the "experience culminated in my standing in the spiritual presence of the Mystery of Golgotha in a most profound and solemn festival of knowledge." His relationship to Christianity thereafter remained entirely founded upon personal experience, and thus both non-denominational and strikingly different from conventional religious forms.

Steiner's Anthroposophy influenced the Russian theologians Pavel Florensky and Sergei Bulgakov. Carl Raschke called Steiner "the occult theologian, par excellence", and stated that Steiner was a pantheist. An evangelical author agrees that Steiner was close to pantheism.

==== Christ and human evolution ====
Steiner describes Christ as the unique pivot and meaning of earth's evolutionary processes and human history, redeeming the Fall from Paradise. He understood the Christ as a being that unifies and inspires all religions, not belonging to a particular religious faith. To be "Christian" is, for Steiner, a search for balance between polarizing extremes and the ability to manifest love in freedom.

Central principles of his understanding include:

- The being of Christ is central to all religions, though called by different names by each.
- Every religion is valid and true for the time and cultural context in which it was born.
- Historical forms of Christianity need to be transformed in our times in order to meet the ongoing evolution of humanity.

In Steiner's esoteric cosmology, the spiritual development of humanity is interwoven in and inseparable from the cosmological development of the universe. Continuing the evolution that led to humanity being born out of the natural world, the Christ being brings an impulse enabling human consciousness of the forces that act creatively, but unconsciously, in nature.

==== Divergence from conventional Christian thought ====
James A. Santucci says Anthroposophy is based upon esoteric Christianity. Steiner's views of Christianity diverge from conventional Christian thought in key places, and include gnostic elements. However, unlike many gnostics, Steiner affirms the unique and actual physical Incarnation of Christ in Jesus at the beginning of the Christian era. One of the central points of divergence with conventional Christian thought is found in Steiner's views on reincarnation and karma.

Steiner also posited two different Jesus children involved in the Incarnation of the Christ: one child descended from Solomon, as described in the Gospel of Matthew; the other child from Nathan, as described in the Gospel of Luke. He references in this regard the fact that the genealogies in these two gospels list twenty-six (Luke) to forty-one (Matthew) completely different ancestors for the generations from David to Jesus. Monty Waldin notes that the two Jesus children sound heretical to mainstream Christians. According to Steiner, Christ will never again have a physical body. Steiner's view of the second coming of Christ is also unusual. He suggested that this would not be a physical reappearance, but rather, meant that the Christ being would become manifest in non-physical form, in the "etheric realm" – i.e. visible to spiritual vision and apparent in community life – for increasing numbers of people, beginning around the year 1933. He emphasized that the future would require humanity to recognize this Spirit of Love in all its genuine forms, regardless of how this is named. He also warned that the traditional name, "Christ", might be used, yet the true essence of this Being of Love be ignored.

The teachings of Anthroposophy got called Christian Gnosticism. Indeed, according to the official stance of the Catholic Church, Anthroposophy is "a neognostic heresy". Other heresiologists agree. The Lutheran (Missouri Sinod) apologist and heresiologist Eldon K. Winker quoted Ron Rhodes that Steiner had the same Christology as Cerinthus. Indeed, Steiner thought that Jesus and Christ were two separated beings, who got fused at a certain point in time, which can be construed as Gnostic but not as Docetic, since "they do not believe the Christ departed from Jesus prior to the crucfixion". "Steiner's Christology is discussed as a central element of his thought in Johannes Hemleben, Rudolf Steiner: A Documentary Biography, trans. Leo Twyman (East Grinstead, Sussex: Henry Goulden, 1975), pp. 96-100. From the perspective of orthodox Christianity, it may be said that Steiner combined a docetic understanding of Christ's nature with the Adoptionist heresy." Older scholarship says Steiner's Christology is Nestorian. According to Egil Asprem, "Steiner's Christology was, however, quite heterodox, and hardly compatible with official church doctrine." Peter Staudenmaier agrees that the anthroposophical "figure of Christ ... is decidedly unorthodox".

Anthony Mellors states that Steiner's interpretation of the Bible is heretical. Two German scholars have called Anthroposophy "the most successful form of 'alternative' religion in the [twentieth] century." Other scholars stated that Anthroposophy is "aspiring to the status of religious dogma". According to Maria Carlson, anthroposophy is a "positivistic religion" "offering a seemingly logical theology based on pseudoscience." According to Swartz, Brandt, Hammer, Hansson, and others Anthroposophy is a religion. They also call it "settled new religious movement", while Martin Gardner and others called it a cult. Another scholar also calls it a new religious movement or a new spiritual movement. Already in 1924 Anthroposophy got labeled "new religious movement" and "occultist movement". Other scholars agree it is a new religious movement. According to Helmut Zander, both the theory and practice of Anthroposophy display characteristics of religion, and, according to Zander, Rudolf Steiner would plead no contest. According to Zander, Steiner's book Geheimwissenschaft [Occult Science] contains Steiner's mythology about cosmogenesis. Hammer notices that Anthroposophy is a synthesis which does include occultism. Hammer also notices that Steiner's occult doctrines bear a strong resemblance to post-Blavatskyan Theosophy (e.g. Annie Besant and Charles Webster Leadbeater).

Another author states that the question whether Anthroposophy is a religion cannot be answered by "Yes" or "No". Somebody else called it "a form of 'Christian occultism'". The Anthroposophist N.C. Thomas denies that Anthroposophy is a religion. Joel Beversluis recognizes that is what Anthroposophists claim. Two Marxist–Leninist German scholars say Anthroposophy is semi-religious. Robert A. McDermott says Anthroposophy belongs to Christian Rosicrucianism. According to Nicholas Goodrick-Clarke, Rudolf Steiner "blended modern Theosophy with a Gnostic form of Christianity, Rosicrucianism, and German Naturphilosophie". He also described Anthroposophy as a [modern] offshoot of Ancient Gnosticism, especially of "the aeons of the Valentinian pleroma". Gary Lachman stated that Steiner stood for a "heavily Christianized version of Theosophy" and "Christianized occult science". According to McDermott, "Rudolf Steiner was an esoteric teacher in the Rosicrucian-Christian tradition [...]". Geoffrey Ahern states that Anthroposophy belongs to neo-gnosticism broadly conceived, which he identifies with Western esotericism and occultism.

Was Steiner a Gnostic? Yes and no. Yes, from the point of view that he offered insights and methods for a personal experience of Christ. I have formulated this aspect of his work as his hermeneutical key: 'not I, but Christ in me'. No, from the point of view that he was not trying to reestablish Gnosticism's practices into a neo-gnostic tradition. Steiner was, in his times, well aware of concerns articulated more recently by Pope Francis about the two subtle enemies of holiness, contemporary Gnosticism and contemporary Pelagianism.

— Samson 2023, p. 180

Granted that Steiner included Gnostic elements in his cosmological reinterpretation of Christianity, many of them from the Pistis Sophia, Steiner was not a Gnostic in the sense of someone who held that the world was ruled by a demiurge, that matter was evil, or that it was possible to escape from this fallen universe by acquiring secret spiritual knowledge. To characterize the structure of his thought as derived from Syrio-Egyptian gnosis (Ahern 2010) may be too strong and plays down the fact that he was critical of early Gnostic Christianity as having no adequate idea of Jesus as a man of flesh and blood.

— Hudson 2019, p. 510

According to Steiner, "Christ's role is to ease the transition to the Age of Aquarius, while for Gnostics, his task was to save humanity from God". Between 1903 and 1910 Steiner published multiple Gnostic texts, while that publishing house was having intention of subverting orthodox Christianity. Elizabeth Dipple stated that Rudolf Steiner's system was a "neo-Platonic, semi-Gnostic, occult anthroposophical system [...] with its allegiance to mystical Christianity, Rosicrucianism and certain versions of spiritualism [...]". According to Heiner Ullrich, Steiner's point of view was that of a "neo-Platonic gnostic". Gareth Knight agrees that Steiner was neo-Platonic. Brandt and Hammer describe Steiner's anthropology (spirit, soul, and body) as neo-Platonic. Carl Abrahamsson stated that Steiner posited a gnostic Christ. Steiner's theology is "redemption through sin", he accuses good Christians of killing the spirit of Christianity.

According to Catholic scholars Anthroposophy belongs to the New Age. George D. Chryssides also considers Steiner to be New Age, or at least a forerunner of the New Age. John Paull considers him a New Age philosopher. Nicholas Campion says Steiner was a New Age Christian. Campion stated that "Anthroposophy is perhaps the most vibrant of New Age movements". Even allowing that Steiner himself was not New Age, an author wrote "anthroposophy—a spiritual movement that is the basis for much of the New Age thinking in Europe and North America today." Roger E. Olson and Dominic Corrywright agree. The New Age Encyclopedia lists Steiner among the luminaries of the New Age. Wouter Hanegraaff discusses two meanings of "New Age": Steiner fits one meaning, but not the other; the difference lies in the absence of the psychologization initiated by the New Thought. That is, Steiner lies at the root of New Age sensu stricto.

==== The Christian Community ====
In the 1920s, Steiner was approached by Friedrich Rittelmeyer, a Lutheran pastor with a congregation in Berlin, who asked if it was possible to create a more modern form of Christianity. Soon others joined Rittelmeyer – mostly Protestant pastors and theology students, but including several Roman Catholic priests. Steiner offered counsel on renewing the spiritual potency of the sacraments while emphasizing freedom of thought and a personal relationship to religious life. He envisioned a new synthesis of Catholic and Protestant approaches to religious life, terming this "modern, Johannine Christianity". The resulting movement for religious renewal became known as "The Christian Community". Its work is based on a free relationship to Christ without dogma or policies. Its priesthood, which is open to both men and women, is free to preach out of their own spiritual insights and creativity. Steiner emphasized that the resulting movement for the renewal of Christianity was a personal gesture of help to a movement founded by Rittelmeyer and others independently of his anthroposophical work. The distinction was important to Steiner because he sought with Anthroposophy to create a scientific, not faith-based, spirituality. He recognized that for those who wished to find more traditional forms, however, a renewal of the traditional religions was also a vital need of the times.

== Reception ==
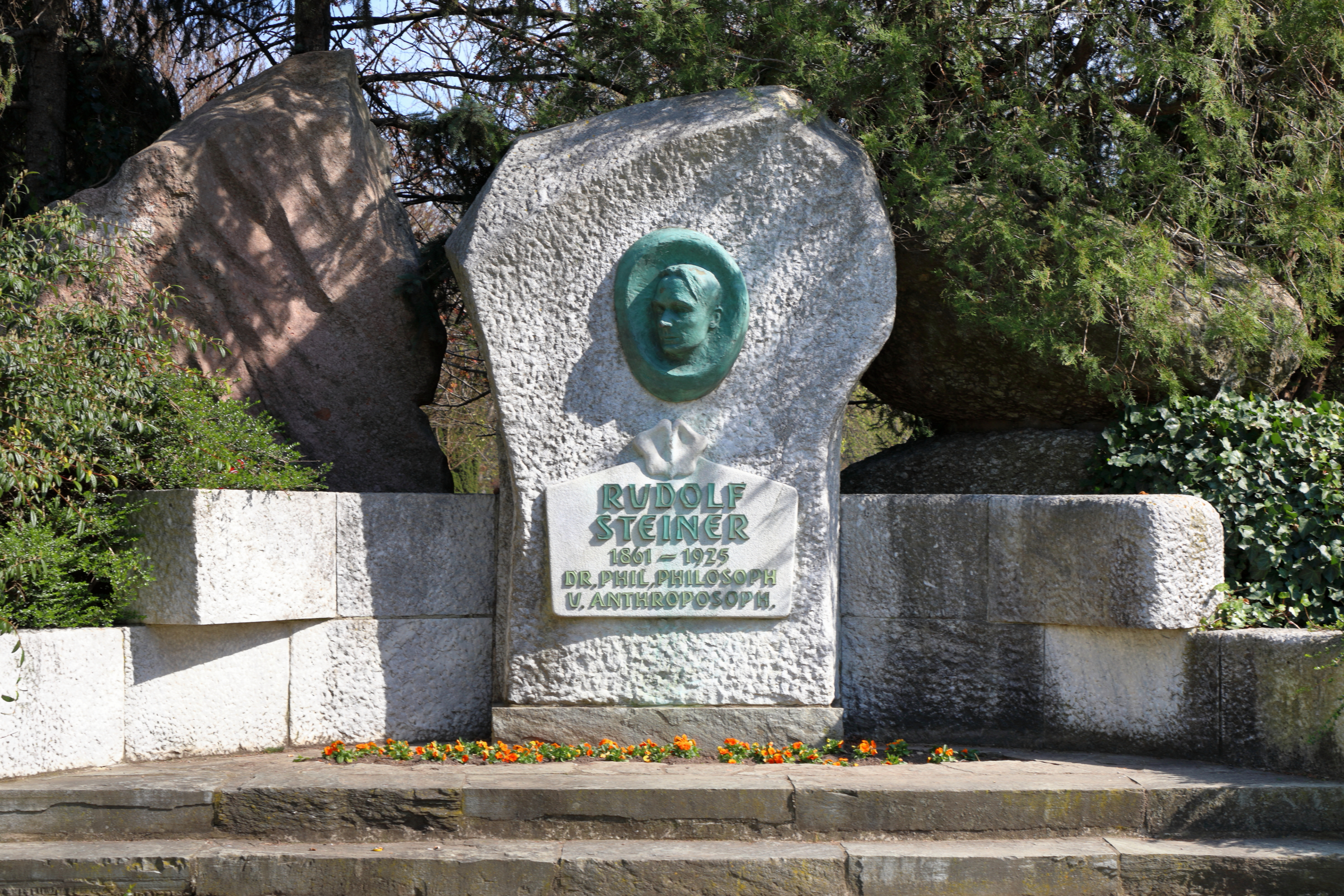
Memorial for Rudolf Steiner in Vienna

Steiner's work has influenced a broad range of notable personalities. These include:

- philosophers Albert Schweitzer, (Note: Albert Schweitzer was not an adept of mysticism or occultism, but of Age of Enlightenment rationalism.) Owen Barfield and Richard Tarnas;
- writers Saul Bellow, Andrej Belyj, Michael Ende, Selma Lagerlöf, Edouard Schuré, David Spangler, and William Irwin Thompson;
- child psychiatrist Eva Frommer;
- music therapist Maria Schüppel
- economist Leonard Read;
- ecologist Rachel Carson;
- artists Joseph Beuys, Wassily Kandinsky, and Murray Griffin;
- esotericist and educationalist George Trevelyan;
- actor and acting teacher Michael Chekhov;
- cinema director Andrei Tarkovsky;
- composers Jonathan Harvey and Viktor Ullmann; and
- conductor Bruno Walter;
- Albert Einstein "attended lectures by Rudolf Steiner."

Olav Hammer, though sharply critical of esoteric movements generally, terms Steiner "arguably the most historically and philosophically sophisticated spokesperson of the Esoteric Tradition." Albert Schweitzer wrote that he and Steiner had in common that they had "taken on the life mission of working for the emergence of a true culture enlivened by the ideal of humanity and to encourage people to become truly thinking beings". Anthony Storr stated about Rudolf Steiner's Anthroposophy: "His belief system is so eccentric, so unsupported by evidence, so manifestly bizarre, that rational skeptics are bound to consider it delusional.... But, whereas Einstein's way of perceiving the world by thought became confirmed by experiment and mathematical proof, Steiner's remained intensely subjective and insusceptible of objective confirmation." Robert Todd Carroll has said of Steiner that "Some of his ideas on education – such as educating the handicapped in the mainstream – are worth considering, although his overall plan for developing the spirit and the soul rather than the intellect cannot be admired". Translators have pointed out that the German term Geist can be translated equally properly as either mind or spirit, however, and that Steiner's usage of this term encompassed both meanings.

The 150th anniversary of Rudolf Steiner's birth was marked by the first major retrospective exhibition of his art and work, 'Kosmos - Alchemy of the everyday'. Organized by Vitra Design Museum, the traveling exhibition presented many facets of Steiner's life and achievements, including his influence on architecture, furniture design, dance (Eurythmy), education, and agriculture (Biodynamic agriculture). The exhibition opened in 2011 at the Kunstmuseum in Stuttgart, Germany,

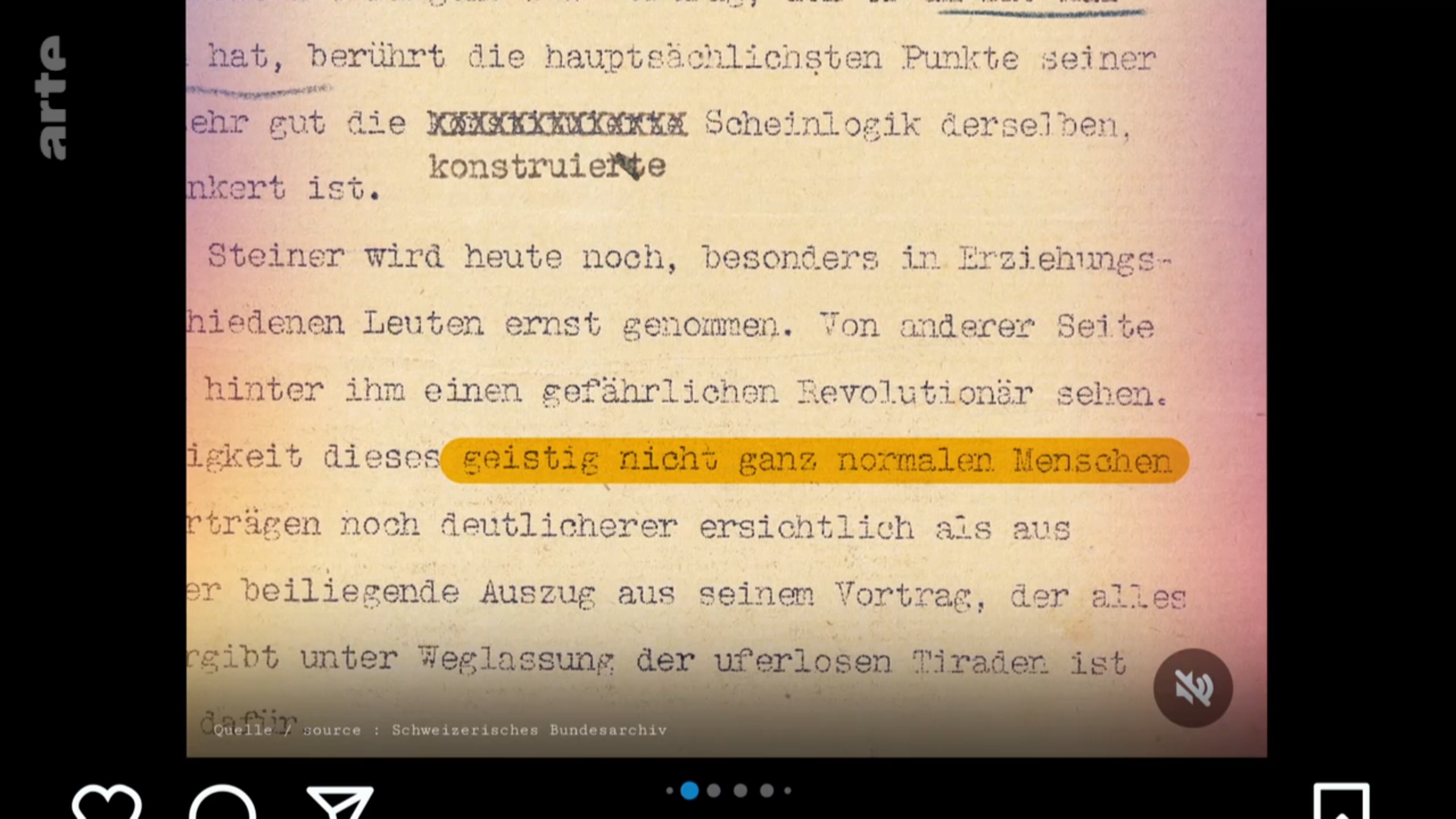
Solothurn Police file on Steiner (highlighted text: "not entirely mentally normal person")

The German psychiatrist Wolfgang Treher diagnosed Rudolf Steiner with schizophrenia, in a book from 1966. The Swiss psychiatrist C.G. Jung was of the same opinion. Colin Wilson admitted that such a diagnosis makes some sense. Francis X. King recognizes that other have stated that about Steiner, but King disagrees with the claim that Steiner was a charlatan. John Francis Moffitt speaks of "Steiner's typically schizoid verbiage", considering it a symptom of schizophrenia. The Canadian psychiatrist Lawrie Reznek agrees with the diagnostic. The following psychiatrists disagree with the diagnosis: Anthony Storr, John S. Price, and Anthony Stevens. Storr did not deny that Steiner held bizarre beliefs, but Storr only diagnosed schizophrenia when people had an occupational impairment. While for Price and Stevens, Steiner's ethics made the difference. Steiner was investigated by the Swiss Police, which stated he was not psychologically normal, but they decided that he was harmless.

Steiner's critics, on the other hand, past and present, see him at best as a pseudo-scientist who was delusional and possibly mentally unstable in believing that he had accessed Kant's realm of the noumenon, or at worst as someone who laid the groundwork for Hitler and National Socialism.

— Aaron French (2025)

Libération described Steiner's claims as fantasist theories; it also notes that this did not prevent him from getting traction.

=== Scientism ===
Olav Hammer has criticized as scientism Steiner's claim to use scientific methodology to investigate spiritual phenomena that were based upon his claims of clairvoyant experience. Steiner regarded the observations of spiritual research as more dependable (and above all, consistent) than observations of physical reality. However, he did consider spiritual research to be fallible, and held the view that anyone capable of thinking logically was in a position to correct errors by spiritual researchers. Another author stated anthroposophy is "Gnostic scientism".

=== Race and ethnicity ===
Steiner's work includes both universalist, humanist elements and racial assumptions. Due to the contrast and even contradictions between these elements, one commentator argues: "whether a given reader interprets Anthroposophy as racist or not depends upon that reader's concerns". Steiner considered that by dint of its shared language and culture, each people has a unique essence, which he called its soul or spirit. He saw race as a physical manifestation of humanity's spiritual evolution, and at times discussed race in terms of complex hierarchies that were largely derived from 19th century biology, anthropology, philosophy and theosophy. However, he consistently and explicitly subordinated race, ethnicity, gender, and indeed all hereditary factors, to individual factors in development. For Steiner, human individuality is centered in a person's unique biography, and he believed that an individual's experiences and development are not bound by a single lifetime or the qualities of the physical body.

Steiner occasionally characterized specific races, nations and ethnicities in ways that have been deemed racist by critics. This includes descriptions by him of certain races and ethnic groups as flowering, others as backward, or destined to degenerate or disappear. He presented explicitly hierarchical views of the spiritual evolution of different races, including—at times, and inconsistently—portraying the white race, European culture or Germanic culture as representing the high point of human evolution as of the early 20th century, although he did describe them as destined to be superseded by future cultures.

Throughout his life Steiner consistently emphasized the core spiritual unity of all the world's peoples and sharply criticized racial prejudice. He articulated beliefs that the individual nature of any person stands higher than any racial, ethnic, national or religious affiliation. His belief that race and ethnicity are transient and superficial, and not essential aspects of the individual, was partly rooted in his conviction that each individual reincarnates in a variety of different peoples and races over successive lives, and that each of us thus bears within him or herself the heritage of many races and peoples. Toward the end of his life, Steiner predicted that race will rapidly lose any remaining significance for future generations. In Steiner's view, culture is universal, and explicitly not ethnically based, and he vehemently criticized imperialism. In the context of his ethical individualism, Steiner considered "race, folk, ethnicity and gender" to be general, describable categories into which individuals may choose to fit, but from which free human beings can and will liberate themselves. Martins and Vukadinović describe the racism of Anthroposophy as spiritual and paternalistic (i.e. benevolent), in contrast to the materialistic and often malignant racism of fascism.

Steiner did influence Italian Fascism, which exploited "his racial and anti-democratic dogma." The fascist ministers Giovanni Antonio Colonna di Cesarò (nicknamed "the Anthroposophist duke"; he became antifascist after taking part in Benito Mussolini's government) and Ettore Martinoli have openly expressed their sympathy for Rudolf Steiner. Most from the occult pro-fascist UR Group were Anthroposophists. Peter Staudenmaier describes Rudolf Steiner as an extreme pan-German nationalist who "never disowned or regretted" such a stance. He notes that "Steiner was a member of a völkisch Wagner club", but also that Steiner's works, "totalling more than 350 volumes, contain pervasive internal contradictions and inconsistencies on racial and national questions." According to Joaquin Munoz, in the materialist perspective (i.e. no reincarnations), Anthroposophy is racist, but in the spiritual perspective (i.e. reincarnations mandatory) it is not racist. Swedish professor emeritus Olav Hammer, an expert in new religious movements and Western esotericism, opines in a review of Staudenmaier's work that the racist and anti-Semitic character of Steiner's teachings cannot be denied, even if it is "spiritual racism". Cristina Burack also notes Steiner's contradictions on racial issues. According to Sven Ove Hansson, "His statements about race are integrated with other elements of his spiritual worldview, from which they cannot easily be separated."

==== Judaism ====
During the years when Steiner was best known as a literary critic, he published a series of articles attacking various manifestations of antisemitism and criticizing some of the most prominent anti-Semites of the time as "barbaric" and "enemies of culture". In contrast, however, Steiner also promoted full assimilation of the Jewish people into the nations in which they lived, suggesting that Jewish cultural and social life had lost its contemporary relevance and that the continued existence of Judaism was "an error of history". Steiner was a critic of his contemporary Theodor Herzl's goal of a Zionist state, and indeed of any ethnically determined state, as he considered ethnicity to be an outmoded basis for social life and civic identity.

According to Eric Kurlander, "Steiner, along with Hübbe-Schleiden and Hartmann, was affiliated with the racist and anti-Semitic Guido von List Society. For many anthroposophists in fact, 'Jewishness signified the very antithesis of spiritual progress and the epitome of modern debasement.'" Kurlander believes that the theories of theosophy and anthroposophy were later "co-opted" by National Socialism. Steiner financed the publication of and wrote a foreword for the book Die Entente-Freimaurerei und der Weltkrieg (Entente Freemasonry and the World War, 1919) by Karl Heise, which was partly based upon his own ideas and has been called a "classic work of anti-Masonry and anti-Judaism." The publication promulgated a conspiracy theory according to which World War I was a consequence of collusion between Freemasons and Jews, their purpose being the destruction of Germany. The writing was later enthusiastically received by the Nazi Party. That was not the only conspiracy theory promoted by Steiner: he accused Freemasons of collusion with the Jesuits, in order to hide the truth about Kaspar Hauser. According to Staudenmaier, Steiner "sometimes held antisemitic views and philosemitic views at the same time".

One crucial stumbling block for English language readers is the anthroposophical tendency to delete racist and antisemitic passages from translated editions of Steiner's publications.

— Peter Staudenmaier (2009)

=== Library ===
Rudolf Steiner's personal library (of approximately 10,000 items) has survived the century since his passing. The items were classified into 19 categories during World War II and more recently into 25 categories. The library is shelved in Dornach, Switzerland. Most of the items (>85%) are in German, although 23 languages are represented with about 500 items in English.

== Writings (selection) ==
See also Works in German

The standard edition of Steiner's Collected Works constitutes about 422 volumes. This includes 44 volumes of his writings (books, essay, plays, and correspondence), over 6000 lectures, and some 80 volumes (some still in production) documenting his artistic work (architecture, drawings, paintings, graphic design, furniture design, choreography, etc.). His architectural work, particularly, has also been documented extensively outside of the Collected Works.

- Goethean Science (1883–1897)
- Theory of Knowledge Implicit in Goethe's World-Conception (1886)
- Truth and Knowledge, doctoral thesis, (1892)
- Intuitive Thinking as a Spiritual Path, also published as the Philosophy of Spiritual Activity and the Philosophy of Freedom (1894) ISBN 0-88010-385-X
- Mysticism at the Dawn of Modern Age (1901/1925)
- Christianity as Mystical Fact (1902)
- Theosophy: An Introduction to the Spiritual Processes in Human Life and in the Cosmos (1904) ISBN 0-88010-373-6
- How to Know Higher Worlds: A Modern Path of Initiation (1904–05) ISBN 0-88010-508-9
- Cosmic Memory: Prehistory of Earth and Man (1904) (Also published as The Submerged Continents of Atlantis and Lemuria)
- The Education of the Child, (1907) ISBN 0-85440-620-4
- The Way of Initiation, (1908) (English edition trans. by Max Gysi)
- Initiation and Its Results, (1909) (English edition trans. by Max Gysi)
- An Outline of Esoteric Science (1910) ISBN 0-88010-409-0
- Four Mystery Dramas (1913)
- The Renewal of the Social Organism (1919)
- Fundamentals of Therapy: An Extension of the Art of Healing Through Spiritual Knowledge (1925)
- Reincarnation and Immortality, Rudolf Steiner Publications. (1970) LCCN 77-130817
- Rudolf Steiner: An Autobiography, Rudolf Steiner Publications, 1977, ISBN 0-8334-0757-0 (Originally, The Story of my Life)
- Rudolf Steiner, Friedrich Nietzsche, Fighter for Freedom Garber Communications; 2nd revised edition (July 1985) ISBN 978-0893450335

== See also ==
- Esotericism
- Guardian of the Threshold
- List of Austrian writers
- Martinus
- Rudolf Steiner and colour mysticism
