= Threatened Children =

1990 nonfiction book by Joel Best

Threatened Children: Rhetoric and Concern about Child-Victims
- Author: Joel Best
- Language: English
- Genre: Nonfiction
- Publisher: University of Chicago Press
- Publication date: 1990
- ISBN: 9780226044262

Threatened Children: Rhetoric and Concern about Child-Victims is a 1990 nonfiction book by American sociologist and criminologist Joel Best, published by the University of Chicago Press.

== See also ==
- The Man They Called a Monster
