= Sexual Deviation (book) =

1964 book

- Author: Anthony Storr
- Language: English
- Publication date: 1964
- Publication place: United Kingdom

Sexual Deviation is a book by Anthony Storr. It discusses topics such as Paraphilia and Homosexuality from a Psychiatry and Biology perspective.

== See also ==
- The Man They Called a Monster
