= Rudolf Steiner's Mystery Dramas =

Set of four plays

Rudolf Steiner wrote four plays that follow the initiation journeys of a group of fictional characters through a series of lives. These plays were intended to be modern mystery plays. Steiner outlined the plot of a fifth play to be set at the Castalian spring at Delphi, but due to the outbreak of First World War, this remained an unfulfilled project.

The titles of the completed plays are:

- The Portal of Initiation - World premiere on 15 August 1910, at the Schauspielhaus in Munich.
- The Trial of the Soul or 'The Soul's Probation'. - World premiere on 17 August 1911, in the Gardener's Place Theatre in Munich.
- The Guardian of the Threshold - World premiere on 24 August 1912, in the Gardener's Place Theatre in Munich.
- The Soul's Awakening - World premiere on 22 August 1913, at the National Theatre in Munich.

== Genesis of the characters ==
In these four plays. Steiner intended to show how spiritual development might manifest in a karmically-intertwined group of people. The experiences of the main characters of the play, particularly Johannes Thomasius, Capesius and Strader, represent aspects of the path of initiation "differing according to the karma of the respective individualities."

Steiner based the first play on Goethe's "Tale of the Green Snake and the Beautiful Lily". In his first draft of the play, the names of the characters were those of the characters in Goethe's tale, but in the course of his work, he replaced the fairytale characters with characters of his own imagination. The following table shows the names from Goethe's fairy tale and the characters these turned into in this first drama:

Goethe’s fairy tale	Steiner’s character
Lily	Maria
Young Man	Johannes Thomasius
1st Irrlicht	Capesius
2nd Irrlicht	Dr. Strader
King of the Will	Romanus (Bronze King)
The old man with the lamp	Felix Balde
King of Feeling	Theodosius (Silver King)
Snake	The other Mary
Wife of the old man	Felicia Balde
1st Maiden	Philia
2nd Maiden	Astrid
3rd Maiden	Luna
Giant	Gairman (Gold King)
Canary	Child
Mixed King	Retardus
The Hawk	Theodora
Hierophant	Benedictus
The Macrocosm	The Spirit of the Elements
Man	Estella
Wife	Sophia

The characters of Helena and Lucifer have no precedent in Goethe's fairy tale and were to be played by the same actress.

=== Historical antecedents ===
In 1907, at the Munich Theosophical Congress, Rudolf Steiner had directed a play by Édouard Schuré, "The Sacred Drama of Eleusis". Two years later, Steiner staged Schuré's "The Children of Lucifer". At this time, Steiner was looking for a spiritual content and artistic form that could reflect what he believed to be a new age in human consciousness.

== Reincarnation and karma ==
For the first time in dramatic poetry, Rudolf Steiner in his dramas presents the driving forces of destiny events, openly and consistently on the stage. The success of the characterizing people towards the inevitability of fate, has always been the main nerve of tragic poetry, and Steiner's characters also remain true to these causes, which are ultimately enigmatic. Rudolf Steiner was the background of the fate complications to their true causes, namely karmic entanglements in former lives on earth, returning and brought dramatically to display in the present for the characters on stage. This is a critical and necessary impetus for the progress of dramatic art, even if it may take long time until it is taken up more widely by the public.

== Lectures ==
Lectures on The Portal of Initiation:

- Rudolf Steiner: The Secrets of the Biblical Creation Story, GA 122, lectures in Munich from 16.8 to 21.08, 1910.
- Rudolf Steiner: The Gospel of Matthew, GA 123, lectures in Bern 2.9, 5.9, 10.9 and 12.09, 1910.
- Rudolf Steiner: Answers to World and Life Issues through Anthroposophy, GA 125, lectures on 09.17.1910 Basel and 10.31.1910 Berlin.
- Rudolf Steiner: From Jesus to Christ, GA 131, lecture from 13.10.1911 in Karlsruhe.

Lectures on The Trial of the Soul:

- Rudolf Steiner: The Mission of the New Spirit Revelation, GA 127, lecture on 19.12.1911 in Berlin.
- Rudolf Steiner: Wonders of the World, GA 129, 1st, 3rd, 5th, 10th, lectures in Munich.

Lectures on The Guardian of the Threshold:

- Rudolf Steiner: Initiation, Eternity and the Passing Moment, GA 138, Lectures on 28.8. and 30.08.1912 in Munich.
- Rudolf Steiner: The Value of Thinking for Sound Human Understanding, GA 164, lecture on 19.09.1915 in Dornach.

Lectures on The Soul's Awakening:

- Rudolf Steiner: The Secrets of the Threshold, GA 147, lectures on 24, 27, 28 and 30, August 1913 in Munich.
- Rudolf Steiner: Mystery centers of the Middle Ages, GA 233, lecture on 05.01.1924 in Dornach.

== Music ==
Adolf Arenson composed the original music to accompany the four plays. Later productions had music by Elmar Lampson and Pedro Guiraud.
