= Rudolf Steiner's exercises for spiritual development =

Spiritual and cognitive development exercises in Anthroposophy

Rudolf Steiner developed exercises aimed at cultivating new cognitive faculties he believed would be appropriate to contemporary individual and cultural development. According to Steiner's view of history, in earlier periods people were capable of direct spiritual perceptions, or clairvoyance, but not yet of rational thought; more recently, rationality has been developed at the cost of spiritual perception, leading to the alienation characteristic of modernity. Steiner proposed that humanity now has the task of synthesizing the rational and contemplative/spiritual components of cognition, whereby spiritual perception would be awakened through intensifying thinking. He considered this relevant not only to personal development, but as a foundation for advanced scientific research.

== Moral background of spiritual development ==
A central principle of Steiner's proposed path to spiritual development is that self-development - inner transformation - is a necessary part of the spiritual path: "for every step in spiritual perception, three steps are to be taken in moral development." According to the spiritual philosophy Steiner founded, anthroposophy, moral development:

- reveals the extent to which a person has achieved control over his or her inner life;
- ensures that he or she lives in harmony with the surrounding natural and social world;
- correlates with his or her progress in spiritual development, the fruits of which are given in spiritual perception; and
- guarantees the capacity to distinguish between true perceptions and illusions, or to distinguish in any perception between the influence of subjective elements and objective realities.

== Meditative path ==
Steiner described three stages of meditative progress: imaginative cognition, inspiration and intuition.

- In imaginative cognition, the meditant aims to achieve thinking independent of sensory perception through concentration on either visual forms of symbolic significance never encountered in the sensory world (e.g. a black cross with a circle of seven red roses superimposed upon it), metamorphoses (e.g. the growth cycle of a plant from seed to mature flower), or mantric verses spoken aloud or silently (e.g. verses for each week of the year intended to connect the meditant with the rhythms of nature).
- In inspiration, the meditant seeks to eliminate all consciously chosen meditative content to open a receptive space in which objective spiritual content (impressions stemming from objective spiritual beings) may be encountered. The meditative activity established in inspirative cognition is set forth without concrete content.
- The stage of intuition is achieved through practicing exercises of will (e.g. reviewing the sequence of the day's events in reverse order). At this stage, the meditant seeks unity with the creative forces of the cosmos without any loss of his or her individualized consciousness.

This sequence of meditative stages has the ultimate goal of the meditant experiencing his or her own karma and previous incarnations, as well as the "Akashic record" of historical events.

== Preliminary requirements for embarking on a spiritual training ==
Steiner stresses that in order for a spiritual training to bear "healthy fruits," a person would have to attend to the following:

- Striving to develop a healthy body and soul.
- Feeling connected with all of existence; to recognize oneself in everything, and everything in oneself; not to judge others without standing in their shoes.
- Recognizing that one's thoughts and feelings have as significant an influence as one's deeds, and that work on one's inner life is as important as work on one's outer life.
- Recognizing that the true essence of a human being does not lie in the person's outer appearance, but rather in the inner nature, in the soul and spiritual existence of this person.
- Finding the genuine balance between having an open heart for the demands of the outer world and maintaining inner strength and "unshakeable endurance."
- The ability to be true to a decision once made, even in the face of daunting adversity, unless one comes to the conclusion that it was or is made in error.
- Developing thankfulness for everything that meets us, and that universal love which allows the world to reveal itself fully to oneself.

== Supplementary exercises ==
Steiner suggested that certain exercises should accompany all meditational practices as a measure of protection against possible negative influences caused by the meditation in the life of the individual. These six exercises, meant to foster positive soul qualities, are:

- Practice self-control over one's thinking. For example: for a period of time -at least five minutes- contemplate any object and concentrate one's thoughts exclusively on this object. (A pencil or a paper clip might do.)
- Exercise willpower by choosing any free deed, i.e. one that nothing is influencing you to do, and choose a regular time of day or day of the week to practice this. (E.g. water plants at the same time each day.)
- Practice equanimity: foster calm emotional responses.
- Try to see positive aspects in everything and to make the best out of every situation.
- Practice being open to new experiences and ideas, never letting expectations based upon the past close your mind to the lessons of the moment.
- Find a harmonious, balanced relationship between the above five qualities, practicing each regularly and becoming able to move dynamically between them.

The initial three exercises are intended to enable a person to attain self-discipline in thinking, willing and feeling. The second group of three involve cultivating attitudes toward the world.

== Individual exercises ==
Exercises developed in anthroposophy include:

- Review of the day. Each evening, going backwards through the day recalling its events, its sequential unfolding (experienced here reversed in time), the people one has met, etc.
- Experiencing the year's unfolding. Exercises Steiner suggested here include:
  - Drawing the same plant or tree or landscape over the course of a year.
  - Meditating the sequence of 52 mantric verses that Steiner wrote to deepen one's experience of the course of the seasons and the year and to bring the inner life of the soul into dialogue with nature, the Soul Calendar.

== See also ==
- Meditation
- Spirituality
