= The Philosophy of Freedom =

Philosophical treatise by Rudolf Steiner

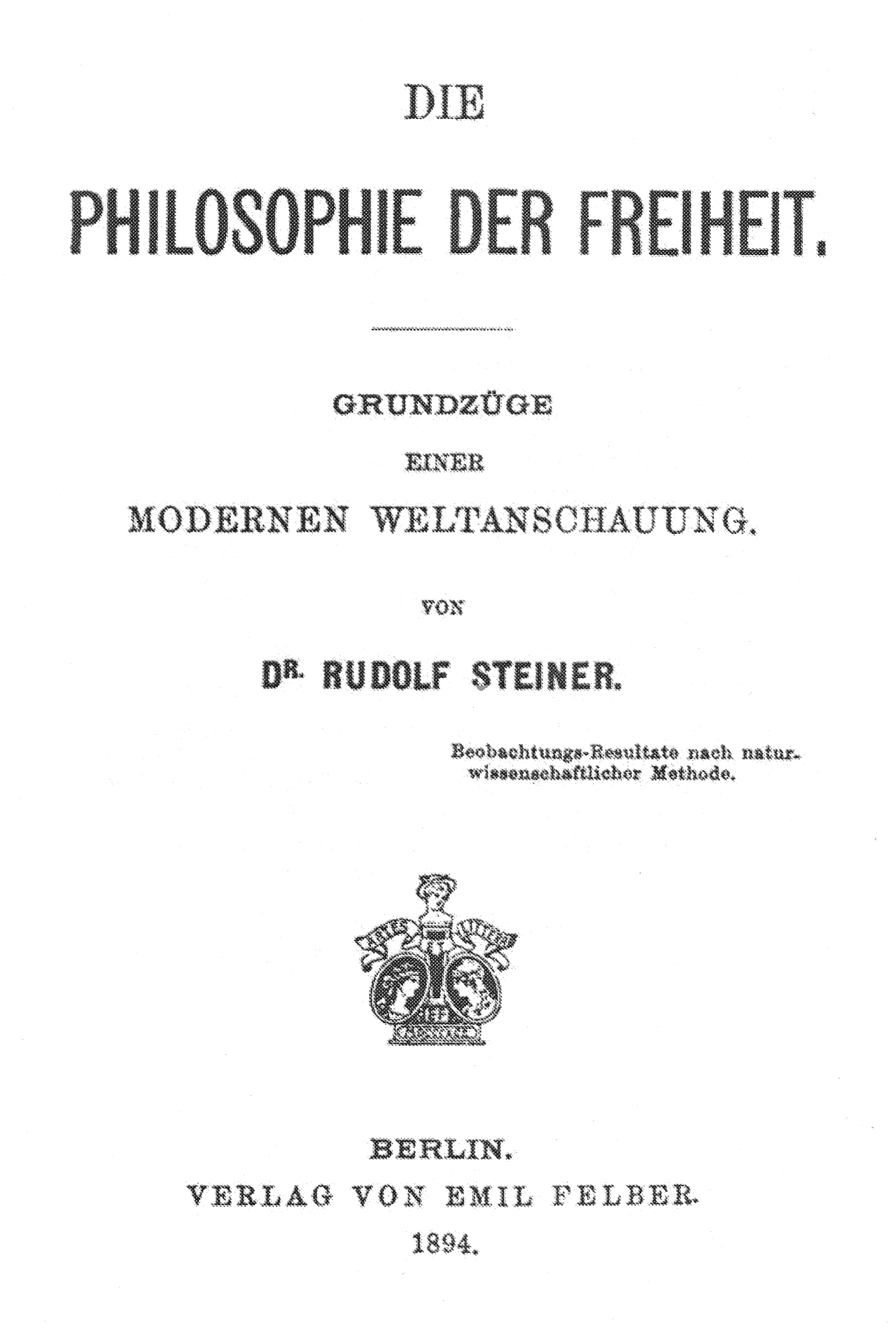
Title page of the original German edition

The Philosophy of Freedom is the fundamental philosophical work of philosopher, Goethe scholar, and esotericist Rudolf Steiner (1861–1925). It addresses the question of whether and in what sense human beings are free. Originally published in 1894 in German as Die Philosophie der Freiheit, with a second edition published in 1918, the work has appeared under several English titles, including The Philosophy of Spiritual Activity (the title Steiner proposed for the English-language translation), The Philosophy of Freedom, and Intuitive Thinking as a Spiritual Path.

"Steiner was a moral individualist". (Note: Ethical individualism is the opposite of ethical collectivism (meaning a moral code which is good for everyone).) Part One of The Philosophy of Freedom examines the basis of freedom in human thinking, provides an account of the relationship between knowledge and perception, and explores the role and reliability of thinking in the formation of knowledge. In Part Two, Steiner analyzes the conditions necessary for human beings to be free, and develops a moral philosophy that he labels "ethical individualism". The book's subtitle, Some results of introspective observation following the methods of natural science, indicates the philosophical approach Steiner intends to take. Steiner hoped that the book "would gain him a professorship", but the book "did not receive the attention he had hoped for." In fact, the book was reasonably favourably received in English, with reviews in Mind, the leading journal of philosophy in England, The Philosophical Review, and The Monist, and in German publications.

According to Gary Lachman, "It's also a work of genius, and one suspects that Steiner's later occult reputation has prevented the book from receiving the kind of attention it deserves." He also wrote, "Mainstream philosophy has as much use for Steiner today as it did a century ago, but his work has been picked up by more alternative thinkers, like William Irwin Thompson and Richard Tarnas."

== Historical context ==
Steiner had wanted to write a philosophy of freedom since at least 1880. The appearance of The Philosophy of Freedom in 1894 was preceded by his publications on Goethe, focusing on epistemology and the philosophy of science, particularly Goethe the Scientist (1883) and The Theory of Knowledge Implicit in Goethe's World Conception (1886). In 1891, Steiner presented his doctoral dissertation, an epistemological study that included a discussion of Kant's and Fichte's theories of knowledge. A revised version of the thesis was published a year later in book form as Truth and Knowledge: Introduction to a Philosophy of Freedom, dedicated to Eduard von Hartmann. In the Preface to The Philosophy of Freedom itself, Steiner described the aim of the book: knowledge should become "organically alive". "All real philosophers have been artists in the realm of concepts. For them, human ideas were their artists' materials and scientific method their artistic technique."

While a student in Vienna, Steiner attended some of the lectures of Franz Brentano, an important precursor of the phenomenological movement in philosophy (see School of Brentano). Like the later phenomenologists, Steiner sought a way to resolve the subject-object problem. Steiner's approach to freedom was also in part inspired by Schiller's On the Aesthetic Education of Man and a response to the scientific works of Goethe, whom Steiner believed had not focused sufficiently on the role of thinking in developing inner freedom.

Steiner was also deeply affected as a young man by Kant's argument in the Critique of Pure Reason that individuals cannot know things as they are in themselves, and he devotes a long chapter of The Philosophy of Freedom, "Are there Limits to Knowledge?", to a refutation of this view, arguing that there are in principle no limits to knowledge. This claim is important to freedom because, for Steiner, freedom involves knowing the real basis of our actions. If this basis cannot be known, then freedom is not possible. Steiner's argument in favor of freedom also responds to determinists such as Spinoza, for whom human action is just as much determined as anything else in the necessity that governs nature as a whole.

== Arrangement and outline of the book ==
The Philosophy of Freedom is divided into three parts. The first part, "Knowledge of Freedom," is epistemological and, in a broad sense, metaphysical (the nature of reality). The second part, "The Reality of Freedom," is about free will and ethics. The title of the third part, "Ultimate Questions" or, in German, "die letzten Fragen," deals with the nature and consequences of the book's monistic, non-materialist worldview.

In his epistemology, Steiner seeks to show that we can achieve a true picture of reality only by uniting perception, which reflects only the outer appearance of the world, and conception, which together give us access to the world's inner nature.

In his account of freedom, this idea is applied to the question of what freedom is. From another epistemological angle, Steiner's account of thinking in Part One becomes his concept of thinking in Part Two. We act freely when we act through the thinking activity of our being. Ethics finds its place in the actions of the free being. The very short Part Three places this activity and the cognitive activity of man in the context of the world considered as an epistemological whole.

== Knowledge of Freedom ==
Steiner begins exploring the nature of human freedom by accepting "that an action, of which the agent does not know why he performs it, cannot be free," but asking what happens when a person becomes conscious of his or her motives for acting. He proposes (1) that through introspective observation we can become conscious of the motivations of our actions, and (2) that the sole possibility of human freedom, if it exists at all, must be sought in an awareness of the motives of our actions.

In Chapter 2, "The Fundamental Desire for Knowledge," Steiner discusses how an awareness of the division between mind, or subject, and world, or object, gives rise to a desire to reestablish a unity between these poles. After criticizing solutions to this problem provided by dualism in the philosophy of mind and several forms of monism as one-sided, Steiner suggests that only by locating nature's manifestations within our subjective nature can we overcome this division.

In Chapter 3, "Thinking in the Service of Knowledge," Steiner notes that when we encounter percepts, we are compelled to contemplate them and supplement them with concepts. Steiner argues that the process of thinking is naturally incorporated into observations. Steiner aims to illustrate that what he views as the fundamental contradiction between observation and thinking forms the basis for all other related contradictions and philosophical distinctions, such as subject vs. object, appearance vs. reality, and so forth. He highlights that for most objects of observation, we cannot simultaneously observe both the percept and our thoughts about it, as a tree and our thoughts about a tree are inherently distinct; we can only focus on one at a time. In contrast, we can simultaneously observe thinking and observe our thoughts about thinking, for here the percept (thinking) and our thinking about the percept consist of the same element (thought): Thinking and thinking about thinking are the same process; observing the latter, we are simultaneously observing the former.

Normally, individuals do not pay attention to the process of thinking, only its results, the thoughts themselves: "The first observation which we make about thinking is, therefore, this: that it is the unobserved element in our ordinary mental and spiritual life". Steiner connects this "first observation" to the fact that thinking is entirely due to our own activity. It does not appear before us unless we produce it. Nevertheless, when I apprehend the content of thinking, a concept, this is self-justifying, in the sense that it can be asked why I feel this or that way about something, but not why it produces in me this or that concept. Such a question would be "simply meaningless". Their contents justify the relations of concepts to one another.

Furthermore, when observing my thinking, it is always a past instance of thinking that I observe, not a present one. That the thinker and the observer of the thinker are one and the same explains why I can know thinking "more intimately and immediately than any other process in the world." This is what Steiner calls the transparency of our thinking process. To appreciate this point, we must be able to adapt to our own thinking of the "exceptional" procedure mentioned above: we must apply it to itself. If we are unable to do this, and we think of thinking as a brain process, it is because we do not see thinking. After all, we are unable to take up the exceptional position needed to do so.

Steiner takes Descartes' dictum, "I think, therefore I am," to signify that "I am certain . . . that [thinking] exists in the sense that I myself bring it forth," However, Steiner advances the objection (common to many others, beginning in Descartes' own time), that the further claim that I am is more problematic.

Steiner's full view is found in the following passage.

...thinking must never be regarded as merely a subjective activity. Thinking lies beyond subject and object. It produces these two concepts just as it produces all others. When, therefore, I, as a thinking subject, refer a concept to an object, we must not regard this reference as something purely subjective. It is not the subject that makes the reference, but thinking. The subject does not think because it is a subject; rather it appears to itself as a subject because it can think. The activity exercised by thinking beings is thus not merely subjective. Rather is it something neither subjective nor objective, that transcends both these concepts? I ought never to say that my individual subject thinks, but much more that my individual subject lives by the grace of thinking.

The Chapter on thinking is followed by a shorter one on perception, Chapter 4. It contains two main and very important points. Steiner points out the inconsistency of treating all our perceptions as mere subjective mental images inside the brain. If that were true, the perception of the brain itself would have to be a mere subjective mental image inside the brain! In that case, the basis for our knowledge of the brain would be completely undermined. The scientific claim is made, on the basis of physiology and psychology, that our percepts are produced by a causal process within the organism and hence are subjective. This is called "critical idealism." But physiology and psychology are based on these percepts. So our knowledge of physiology and psychology is subjective. But then it cannot validate the claim that percepts are subjective. Furthermore, critical idealism leaves unaccounted for the passage from the brain process to the sensation.

What are the consequences of such a view of perception for the concept of knowledge? In Chapter 5, Steiner presents his concept of knowledge. Human beings are two-sided, as they both think and also perceive. The two activities together give a complete view of the world. Knowledge is the union of what is produced in thinking, the concept, and what is produced in perceiving, the percept. Steiner argues that there can be no relationship among the objects of perception other than what is revealed in the ideal element produced by thinking, the concept. Accordingly, the relation between some perceived object and ourselves is also an ideal one.

An important passage analyzes the view that we cannot experience the world itself but only subjective images somewhere inside the brain, or in the soul inside the brain. This view is based on treating the perceptual relationship between self and world as other than ideal, as naively real, just as we perceive it, as a process derived in its content from perception itself.

At the end of Chapter 5, Steiner completes the view of perception begun in Chapter 4. What is the percept that perceiving produces? Steiner rejects this question. "The question asked in this way is absurd." For a percept is the determinate content of the perception, and its "what?" - what it is - can only refer to this content.

We can become conscious of our thought processes in a way that we cannot be of our feelings, will, or sense perceptions. We know that what we experience in thinking is exactly what it seems, so that appearance and reality become one. By contrast, our feelings' meaning is not directly apparent, while we only perceive the meaning of a percept after some form of conceptual framework has been brought to bear (for example, we give the right spatial meaning to the visually converging lines of railroad tracks through our understanding of perspective). Mathematics is an example of thinking in which thought itself forms the perceptions; no sense perceptions are needed to form a basis for mathematical principles. In this sense, mathematics could be said to be one discipline that studies the inner aspect of reality.

Steiner proposes that the apparent dualism of experience can be overcome by discovering the inner and initially hidden unity of perception and thinking. By observing a thinking process sufficiently intensively, perceiving and thinking can begin to unify. This is knowledge. By the same token, a clear-eyed study of what is revealed in observation can lead to appropriate concepts - thinking.

Steiner argues that thinking is more pervasive in our ordinary perceiving than we often recognize. If, for example, we had not as infants learned, unconsciously, to think with our eyes and limbs, then our eyes, even if functioning perfectly in a physical sense, would see only something like what the philosopher William James referred to as a "blooming buzzing confusion," or what Steiner referred to as a highly chaotic stage of the "given." We would not perceive spatial or temporal structure or recognize distinct qualities. If that conclusion seems surprising, that is because the thinking-in-perceiving learned in childhood becomes habitual and automatic long before we attain full consciousness, so we rarely become aware of the key role cognition plays in even the simplest perceptions. Similarly, we are unconscious of the ways we perceive our thinking.

'Our next task must be to define the concept of "mental picture" more closely,' Steiner writes at the end of Chapter 6. With this concept, we arrive at the relation of knowledge to the individual, and life, and feeling. After a refutation of the subjectivity of percepts, Steiner describes a mental picture as an intuition or thought related to an individual percept. And so the mental picture is defined as an individualized concept.

Experience is the "sum total" of mental pictures of the individual. However, the human cognitive inventory extends beyond percept, concept, and mental picture. It also includes the relation of these elements to the Ego, which is feeling. Feeling establishes our personal connection to the world, and we fluctuate between this personal connection and the "universal world process" presented in thinking. The mental pictures we create impart an individualized quality to our mental life and connect it to our personal experiences.

Chapter 7 takes up the consequences of the view that knowledge consists of the restoration of the unity of the content of the percept and the concept. Steiner calls those who make the epistemological distinction into a permanent metaphysical one dualists. For the monist, 'The world is given to us as a duality, and knowledge transforms it into a unity.' Working with an irresolvable distinction, the dualist is bound to assert that there are limits to knowledge: 'the "in itself" of a thing.' For the monist, there is no in-principle limit to knowledge.

For monism in Steiner's sense, there are only concepts and percepts, which, united, form the object; for the dualist, there is the subject, the object, the percept, and the concept. We must not conceive of the process of perception as though it is naïvely real, as we do when we take perception to be a causal effect of the things as they are in themselves on us. Metaphysical realism is the view that there is an object in the world that is imperceptible as it is in itself, but is also to be conceived naïve realistically. It 'is a contradictory mixture of naïve realism and idealism. Its hypothetical [elements] are imperceptible entities endowed with the qualities of percepts'. For the monist, the process of perception is an ideal relation. The metaphysical realist, however, is left with the unanswerable question of how the metaphysically real objects are converted into subjective percepts. Here Steiner can be read as giving his account of the structure and basis of what is today called the mind-body problem.

Steiner's summary of Part I of The Philosophy of Freedom, at the start of Chapter 8 in Part II, contains the following passage:

The world comes to meet me as a multiplicity, a sum of separate details. As a human being, I am myself one of these details, an entity among other entities. We call this form of the world simply the given and—insofar as we do not develop it through conscious activity but find it ready-made—we call it percept. Within the world of percepts, we perceive ourselves. But if something did not emerge out of this self-percept that proved capable of linking both percepts in general and also the sum of all other percepts with the percept of our self, our self-percept would remain simply one among many. This emerging something, however, is no longer a mere percept; nor is it, like percepts, simply present. It is produced through activity and initially appears linked to what we perceive as our self, but its inner meaning reaches beyond the self. It adds conceptual determinates to individual percepts, but these conceptual determinates relate to one another and are grounded in a whole. It determines conceptually what is achieved through self-perception conceptually, just as it determines all other percepts. It places this as the subject or "I" over against objects. This "something" is thinking, and the conceptual determinates are concepts and ideas.

== The Reality of Freedom ==
Steiner begins the second part of the book by emphasizing the role of self-awareness in objective thinking. Here he modifies the usual description of inner and outer experience by pointing out that our feelings, for example, are given to us as naively as outer perceptions. Both of these, feelings and perceptions, tell about objects we are interested in: the one about ourselves, the other about the world. Both require the help of thinking to penetrate the reasons that they arise, to comprehend their inner message. The same is true of our will. Whereas our feelings tell how the world affects us, our will tells how we would affect the world. Neither attains to true objectivity, for both mix the world's existence and our inner life in an unclear way. Steiner emphasizes that we experience our feelings and will - and our perceptions as well – as being more essentially part of us than our thinking; the former are more basic, and more natural. He celebrates this gift of natural, direct experience, but points out that this experience is still dualistic in the sense that it only encompasses one side of the world.

With regard to freedom of the will, Steiner observes that a key question is how the will to action arises in the first place. Steiner describes, to begin with, two sources for human action: on the one hand, the driving forces springing from our natural being, from our instincts, feelings, and thoughts insofar as these are determined by our character - and on the other hand, various kinds of external motives we may adopt, including the dictates of abstract ethical or moral codes. In this way, both nature and culture bring forces to bear on our will and soul life. Overcoming these two elements, neither of which is individualized, we can achieve genuinely individualized intuitions that speak to the particular situation at hand. By overcoming a slavish or automatic response to the dictates of both our 'lower' drives and conventional morality, and by orchestrating a meeting place of objective and subjective elements of experience, we find the freedom to choose how to think and act (Steiner [Wilson translation] Ch. 9).

Freedom for Steiner does not consist in acting out everything subjective within us, but in acting out of love, thoughtfully and creatively. In this way, we can love our own actions, which are unique and individual to us, rather than stemming from obedience to external moral codes or compulsive physical drives. Both of the latter constitute limitations on freedom:

Whether his unfreedom is forced on him by physical means or by moral laws, whether man is unfree because he follows his unlimited sexual desire or because he is bound by the fetters of conventional morality, is quite immaterial from a certain point of view...let us not assert that such a man can rightly call his actions his own, seeing that he is driven to them by a force other than himself.

Freedom arises most clearly at the moment when a human being becomes active in pure, individualized thinking; this is, for Steiner, spiritual activity. Achieving freedom is then accomplished by learning to let an ever larger portion of one's actions be determined by such individualized thought, rather than by habit, addiction, reflex, or involuntary or unconscious motives. Steiner differentiates pure thinking into "moral intuition" (formulation of individual purposes), "moral imagination" (creative strategies for realizing these larger purposes in the concrete situation), and "moral technique" (the practical capacity to accomplish what was intended). He suggests that we only achieve free deeds when we find an ethically impelled but particularized response to the immediacy of a given situation. Such a response will always be radically individual; it cannot be predicted or prescribed.

== Four concepts of freedom ==
Already in Ch. 1 of The Philosophy of Freedom Steiner had made the claim, 'That an action, of which the agent does not know why he performs it, cannot be free, goes without saying' (ist selbstverständlich). This is a preliminary statement; it does not amount to a definition or statement of what freedom is. The statement that no action is free unless the agent knows why he performs it is equivalent to the statement that if an action is free, then the agent does know why he performs it. The second statement is not a definition, which has the form of a full equivalence, but merely one implication, though a highly suggestive and methodologically important one.

For the full account of freedom, which includes four different characterizations of freedom, we must wait until Chapter 9, "The Idea of Freedom". Here we encounter the following definitions. But they are distinct. 'It is difficult to find out exactly what Dr. Steiner understands by 'freedom.' He defines it differently in different places . . .' Individuals have debated whether these characterizations represent four distinct or complementary criteria on a single concept. From the text of Chapter 9, it is difficult to say which of these is the correct interpretation.

=== (1) Love ===
'I carry it [the action] out because I love it.' In the long paragraph containing this statement, Steiner sets the love of the action within the context that a free action is not influenced by any "moral maxim". This is clearly an attack on Kant. The action is carried out the moment '. . . I have grasped the idea of it, on the basis of love, and I am not a "superior automaton" obeying the maxim.

=== (2) The Ideal Part of my Being: Thinking ===
'An action is felt to be free in so far as the reasons for it spring from the ideal part of my individual being; every other part of an action [?] . . . is felt to be unfree'; . . . every other part of an action . . . is felt to be unfree' (Wilson's translation gives an unnecessarily subjective reading here, as the German original makes no mention of what "is felt to be free": 'Einen Handlung, deren Grund in dem ideellen Teil meines individuellen Wesens liegt, ist (emphasis added) frei . . . jede andere . . .ist (emphasis added) unfrei.' Steiner's entirely objective formulation does not allow the so-called open question argument: though 'Though the action is felt to be free, is it free?' and thereby sidesteps the vexed and dubious libertarian argument for freewill based merely on the subjective feeling of freedom.)

=== (3) Obedience to Oneself ===
'Man is free in so far as he is able to obey himself in every moment of his life.' Here the topic has changed. In (2) we were offered a definition of the free act. Now in (3) the question seems to be what a free man or human being is. 'Man is free . . .' ('Frei ist der Mensch'). The requirement is remarkably demanding: 'in so far as he is able to obey himself in every moment of his life . . .', so that it only takes one failure of the ability in one "Augenblick" to make him unfree. Besides, Definition (3) suffers from a formal defect to the extent that it must include the modal formulation ("is able to obey himself") which seems to presuppose freedom ("is able to . . .", "in der Lage ist"). Definition (3) is also surprisingly Spinozist, in the sense that the freedom of a being is for Spinoza, in the Letter to Schuller of 1674, quoted by Steiner in Steiner [Wilson translation], 1965, p. 5, "the ability to act from the necessity of its nature". It is a consequence of (3) that freedom is the antithesis of duty, because "duty does not acknowledge the individual element" in our actions.

=== (4) "Non-Objective Determination of the Self" ===
In the case of man the free spirit, unlike in every other case, the concept and percept of our being do not coincide, in reality, or belong together originally, until man himself brings it about, in his own consciousness, that they should. 'Concept and percept coincide in this case only if man makes them coincide. This he can only do if he has found the concept of the free spirit, that is, if he has found the concept of his own self.''Only he himself can make of himself a free man('Ein freies Wesen kann er nur selbst aus sich machen.)'

Freedom is (1) love; (2) thinking, which Steiner also calls "love in its spiritual form"; (3) Obedience to Oneself; (4) "Non-Objective Determination of the Self".

It seems, however, that Steiner intends his different characterizations or definitions to apply to different aspects of the concept of freedom, rather than to be different concepts of freedom, and that he regarded them as bringing out different points about a consistent whole. It would be worth trying to express what this consistent whole is, or how Steiner intended to characterize it, if he did. It seems reasonable to suppose that he saw this unity in the concept of spirit or a spiritual being, and where on his view, as on traditional religious views, as well as New Age views, not all spiritual beings are human beings, though (a further difficulty) not all spiritual beings are free. On the other hand, Steiner had a strong sense of the proper order of epistemological exposition, and difficulty might be that he cannot assume the concept of a spiritual being prior to the epistemology and metaphysics of The Philosophy of Freedom. The alternative is to forego the ideal of an inquiry which is vorausetzungslos or without presupposition, or to rest with a "disjunctive" concept of freedom: an act is free if it is done out of love, or from the ideal part of one's nature, or out of obedience to oneself, or which has the characteristic of "non-objective determination of the self. The latter course hardly seems to have been one that Steiner would have taken, since he regarded the definitions as complementary if not equivalent.

== Steiner's ethics ==
Steiner's ethical philosophy is neither utilitarian nor deontological. "...Steiner is not implying that the circumstances are...shaping the free deed. For Steiner, the highest morality exists when a person acts in the world through deeds of love realized by means of individually developed and contextually-sensitive moral imaginations. The ethical act is the one performed in or out of freedom, in the sense developed in the first part of Steiner's book. This of course raises a difficulty concerning the one who loves evil and acts on the basis of this love. Are his actions of "the highest morality"? It cannot be so, since the act is evil. On the other hand, it must be so, since the act is performed out of love. Steiner's answer . . .

This all is by way of introduction and recapitulation. Steiner then introduces the principle that we can act out of the compulsions of our natural being (reflexes, drives, desires) or out of the compulsion of ethical principles, and that neither of these leaves us free. Between them, however, is an individual insight, a situational ethic, that arises neither from abstract principles nor from our bodily impulses. A deed that arises in this way can be said to be truly free; it is also both unpredictable and wholly individual. Here Steiner articulates his fundamental maxim of social life:

Live through deeds of love, and let others live with understanding for each person's unique intentions. Reference?

Here he describes a polarity of influences on human nature, stating that morality transcends both the determining factors of bodily influences and those of convention:

A moral misunderstanding, a clash, is out of the question between people who are morally free. Only one who is morally unfree, who obeys bodily instincts or conventional demands of duty, turns away from a fellow human being if the latter does not obey the same instincts and demands as himself. Reference?

For Steiner, true morality, the highest good, is universal mediated by the profoundly individual and situational; it depends upon our achieving freedom from both our inner drives and outer pressures. To achieve such free deeds, we must cultivate our moral imagination, our ability to imaginatively create ethically sound and practical solutions to new situations, in fact, to forge our own ethical principles and to transform these flexibly as needed - not in the service of our own egotistical purposes, but in the face of new demands and unique situations. This is only possible through moral intuitions, immediate experiences of spiritual realities that underlie moral judgments. Moral imagination and intuition allows us to realize our subjective impulses in objective reality, thus creating bridges between the spiritual influence of our subjectivity and the natural influence of the objective world in deeds whereby "that which is natural is spiritual, that which is spiritual is natural".

Toward the end of the second part of the book, Steiner writes that "The unique character of the idea, by means of which I distinguish myself as 'I', makes me an individual." And then, "An act the grounds for which lie in the ideal part of my nature is free." Steiner is using the term ideal to refer to pure ideation or pure thinking in Steiner's sense. "The action is therefore neither stereotyped, carried out according to set rules, nor is it performed automatically in response to an external impetus; the action is determined solely through its ideal content." What is individual in us is to be distinguished from what is generic by its ideal character. If an act proceeds out of genuine thinking, or practical reason, then it is free.

Steiner concludes by pointing out that to achieve this level of freedom, we must lift ourselves out of our group existence: out of the prejudices we receive from our family, nation, ethnic group and religion, and all that we inherit from the past that limits our creative and imaginative capacity to meet the world directly. Only when we realize our potential to be a unique individual are we free. Thus, it lies in our freedom to achieve freedom; only when we actively strive towards freedom do we have some chance of attaining it.

Steiner declared "it is nonsense to ask about the freedom of will".

According to Aaron French, "He referred to this process as 'ethical individualism,' a concept which, for Steiner, implied that the ethical value of one’s actions had to be decided for oneself, by the individual." According to Heiner Ullrich, "Thus with his 'ethical individualism' the early Steiner delivers a naturalistic doctrine of behavior, not a system of ethics which — as, for instance, Kant does with the categorical imperative — assists in providing an autonomous model for principles of moral behavior."

== Ultimate Questions ==
The third part of Steiner's book is the shortest, consisting of one Chapter, "The Consequences of Monism", nine pages in the original German of the 1894 edition, and ten pages in Michael Wilson's 1964 translation.

== Relation to earlier and later works ==
Before 1900, Steiner was laying the epistemological basis of his thought. Steiner wrote that The Philosophy of Freedom was intended to give the philosophical foundations for what had been outlined in his earlier work Truth and Science (1892).

In works written after 1900, Steiner began to explain how thinking can evolve to become an organ of perception of higher worlds of living, creative, and spiritual beings. Steiner frequently referred to The Philosophy of Freedom in his later lectures and in written works. Near the end of his life, he suggested that The Philosophy of Freedom would outlive all his other works.

Steiner's principal works on philosophy include:

- 1886 The Theory of Knowledge Implicit in Goethe's World-Conception. Steiner considered this to be "the epistemological foundation and justification for every thing I said and published later. It speaks of the essential being of knowing activity that opens the way from the sense-perceptible world into the spiritual one."
- 1892 Truth and Science (or Truth and Knowledge), dedicated to Eduard von Hartmann.
- 1894 The Philosophy of Freedom. This presented the philosophical foundations for what had been outlined in Truth and Science, and its line of thought led to the same goal as Steiner's later book Theosophy: An Introduction to the Supersensible Knowledge of the World and the Destination of Man (1904). It contained, he claimed, the entire content, in a philosophical form, of what he later developed explicitly as anthroposophy.
- 1914 A Brief Outline of an Approach to Anthroposophy, chapter 8 in the book The Riddles of Philosophy Presented in an Outline of Its History.

== Editorial history ==
The first edition of Die Philosophie der Freiheit was published in 1894. A second revised edition appeared in 1918. Further German editions reprinted the 1918 text until 1973, when a revised edition was produced based on Steiner's corrections of the galley proofs of the 1918 edition. Minor changes, including corrections to some of Steiner's citations, were made in the 1987 German edition.

The first edition included the following passage Steiner removed from later editions: "We no longer believe that there is a norm to which we must all strive to conform. Nothing is accepted as valid, unless it springs from the roots of individuality. The saying Each one of us must choose his hero in whose footsteps he toils up to Olympus no longer holds for us. If only we probe deep enough into the very heart of our being, there dwells something noble, something worthy of development."

In the appendix added to the 1918 edition, Steiner stated emphatically that the monism "of thought" proposed in his book was quite different from what Eduard von Hartmann and others called "epistemological" monism.

== English translations ==
English translations include:

- 1916: The Philosophy of Freedom: A Modern Philosophy of Life Developed by Scientific Methods. trans. Hoernlé and Hoernlé, ed. Harry Collison, published by G. P. Putnam's Sons, London and New York. The only English translation of the first German edition. This edition's chapter numbering differs from that of all later editions.
- 1922: The Philosophy of Spiritual Activity. Based on 2nd German edition, trans. Hoernlé and Hoernlé.
- 1939: The Philosophy of Spiritual Activity, trans. Hermann Poppelbaum, based on Hoernlé and Hoernlé translation.
- 1963: The Philosophy of Spiritual Activity: Fundamentals of a Modern View of the World, trans. Rita Stebbing. A USA edition; includes a Bibliographical Note.
- 1964: The Philosophy of Freedom: The Basis for a Modern World Conception, trans. Michael Wilson. 7th English edition.
- 1986: The Philosophy of Spiritual Activity: Basic Features of a Modern World View, trans. William Lindeman.
- 1992: The Philosophy of Spiritual Activity: A Philosophy of Freedom trans. Rita Stebbing, ISBN 1855840006.
- 1995: Intuitive Thinking as a Spiritual Path: A Philosophy of Freedom, trans. Michael Lipson, based on Wilson translation.

There is a comparison tool to compare most of the above translations.

=== The source of the alternative titles ===
Though The Philosophy of Freedom is a literal translation of the original German title (Die Philosophie der Freiheit), Steiner suggested at the time of the first English edition in 1916 that the title The Philosophy of Spiritual Activity should be used in the English translation, as it would represent the book's theme of freedom as a dynamic process of development more accurately, as opposed to the fixed state perhaps suggested by the etymology of "freedom" (dom=a state or condition). English readers, Steiner believed, might easily believe that freedom is something already in their possession, and needed to be shaken out of their complacence.

== See also ==
- Introspection
- Natural science
- Scientific method
- Paul Tillich
- True Will

== Bibliography ==
- Rudolf Steiner on His Book the Philosophy of Freedom, Compiled by Otto Palmer (1964), SteinerBooks (1975), Reprinted.
- G. A. Bondarev, Rudolf Steiner's "Philosophie der Freiheit" as the Foundation of the Logic of Beholding. Religion of the Thinking Will. Organon of the New Cultural Epoch. An introduction to Anthroposophical Methodology, translated from the German edition, 2004. ISBN 978-1-105-05765-6.
- Welburn, Andrew, Rudolf Steiner's Philosophy and the Crisis of Contemporary Thought (2004), ISBN 0-86315-436-0 (for Steiner and Edmund Husserl, see p. 98 ff.). – Marek B. Majorek, has discussed Rudolf Steiner's Spiritual Science in relation to Husserl's transcendental reduction – Majorek, Marek B. (2007). "Origins of consciousness and conscious (free) intentions from the viewpoint of Rudolf Steiner's Spiritual Science (Anthroposophy) in relation to Husserl's transcendental reduction". Phenomenology of Life from the Animal Soul to the Human Mind II: The Human Soul in the Creative Transformation of the Mind. Springer. pp. 259–278. ISBN 978-1402051814.
- Sergei O. Prokofieff, Anthroposophy and The Philosophy of Freedom. Anthroposophy and its Method of Cognition. The Christological and Cosmic-Human Dimension of The Philosophy of Freedom, Temple Lodge Publishing, London 2009, from the German edition, 2006. ISBN 978-1-906999-02-5.
- Iddo Oberski, Key to Life: An Introductory Sketch to Rudolf Steiner's Philosophy of Freedom, Eloquent Books 2010. ISBN 1609118650.
- Sergei O. Prokofieff, The Guardian of the Threshold and the Philosophy of Freedom: On the Relationship of The Philosophy of Freedom to the Fifth Gospel, Temple Lodge Publishing, Forest Row 2011.
