= Anthony Storr =

English psychiatrist, psychoanalyst, and author (1920–2001)

- Born: 18 May 1920; London, UK
- Died: 17 March 2001 (aged 80)

Anthony Storr (18 May 1920 – 17 March 2001) was an English psychiatrist, psychoanalyst, and author.

== Background and education ==
Born in London, Storr was educated at Winchester College, Christ's College, Cambridge, and Westminster Hospital. He was in the first cohort of medics to train in Jungian analysis at the Society of Analytical Psychology in London.

== Career ==
In 1974, Storr moved from private practice to a teaching appointment at the Warneford Hospital in Oxford, until his retirement in 1984.

== Personal ==
Storr was, as one of his obituarists observed, "no stranger to suffering at formative stages of his life." He married twice, to Catherine Cole (who became a children's writer under her married name) in 1942 and writer Catherine Peters in 1970 after the first marriage ended in divorce.

== Distinctions ==
- Emeritus Fellow of Green College (1984)
- Fellow of the Royal Society of Literature (1990)
- Honorary FRCPsych (1993)

== Works ==
In his books, Storr explored the secrets of the dark sides of the human psyche – sexual deviations (Sexual Deviation, 1964), aggression (Human Aggression, 1968), and destructiveness (Human Destructiveness, 1972). At the same time, he saw the possibility of creative use of these spontaneous drives and directing them towards sports, scientific and artistic feats (The Dynamics of Creation, 1972).

In his book Music and the Mind, Storr explores various theories on the origins of music.

In chapter 3 of the book Storr writes:

Although music is sometimes referred to as a universal language, this is an entirely misleading description. The difficulty of appreciating music from different periods of history or from different cultures is a powerful argument in favour of the view that the various types of music are predominantly cultural artefacts rather than based on natural phenomena.

In his final book Feet of Clay; Saints, Sinners, and Madmen: The Power and Charisma of Gurus (1996) Storr tracks typical patterns, often involving psychotic disorders that shape the development of the guru. He challenges Jesus' mental health by implying that there are psychological similarities between crazy "messiahs" such as Jim Jones, David Koresh, and respected religious leaders, including Jesus. His study is an attempt to look at Jesus as one of many gurus.

== Publications ==
- The Integrity of the Personality (1961) ISBN 978-0-345-37585-8
- Sexual Deviation (1964) ISBN 978-0-14-020649-4
- Human Aggression (1968) ISBN 978-0-689-10261-5
- Human Destructiveness (1972) ISBN 978-0-435-82190-6
- The Dynamics of Creation (1972) ISBN 978-0-689-10455-8
- Jung (1973) ISBN 978-0-00-633166-7
- The Essential Jung (1983) ISBN 978-0-691-08615-6
- The School of Genius (1988) ISBN 978-90-254-6789-0
- Solitude: A Return to the Self (1988) ISBN 978-0-00-654349-7 — paperback retitling of The School of Genius
- Freud (1989) ISBN 978-0-192-82210-9 (Past Masters)
- The Art of Psychotherapy (1979, 1980) ISBN 978-0-416-60211-1
- Churchill's Black Dog, Kafka's Mice, and Other Phenomena of the Human Mind (1990) ISBN 978-0-00-637566-1
- Human Destructiveness: The Roots of Genocide and Human Cruelty (1991) ISBN 978-0-415-07170-3 – fully revised edition of Human Destructiveness
- Music and the Mind (1992) ISBN 978-0-00-215398-0
- Feet of Clay; Saints, Sinners, and Madmen: A Study of Gurus (1996) ISBN 978-0-684-82818-3
- The Essential Jung: Selected Writings (1998) ISBN 978-0-00-653065-7 – another edition of The Essential Jung
- Freud: A Very Short Introduction (2001) ISBN 978-0-19-285455-1 – another edition of Freud (1989)

== See also ==
- Richard Webster
- Sadism and masochism in fiction
- Sexual abuse by yoga gurus
- The Assault on Truth
