= The Man They Called a Monster =

1981 book by Paul Wilson

- Author: Paul Wilson
- Language: English
- Publisher: Cassell Australia
- Publication date: 1981
- Publication place: Australia
- Pages: 150
- ISBN: 9780726992827

The Man They Called a Monster: Sexual experiences between men and boys is a book written by Paul Wilson and published by Cassell Australia in 1981. The book is a case study of the Clarence Osborne case.

== Content ==
The book was published after a paper Wilson wrote on the topic of Osborne's case. It contains Wilson's legal, moral and medical analysis on the controversy beyond his original publication, as well as an analysis of Osborne's recorded life until his suicide at the age of 56 and the ensuing media coverage.

The research for the book was partially based on Osborne's own accounts of his relations with adolescent boys, as well as interviews Wilson conducted with some of the boys.

== Reception ==
A review by David Biles published on the Australian and New Zealand Journal of Criminology in 1982 stated that Wilson's "case study deserves to be widely read and discussed by all concerned with the social and legal issues of deviant sexual behaviour".

A 2022 review and retrospective by Ryan Throneycroft, published on the Archives of Sexual Behavior, stated that the "book, no matter how controversial, adds to that discussion and debate."
