= American Eurythmy School =

The American Eurythmy School is a four-year eurythmy training in Weed, California, near Mount Shasta. It was founded in 1984 by Karen Sherman McPherson, who studied under Ilona Schubert in the 1970s in Dornach, Switzerland, and is the second largest four-year eurythmy training in North America. The first graduation from the four-year program was held in 1990. There are many graduates of the School teaching in Waldorf schools and performing in the United States.

== Training program ==
McPherson began her eurythmy training at the Eurythmy School at the Goetheanum in Switzerland and went on to train outside established training programs, under Ilona Schubert and Friedel Thomas, two of the original eurythmists who trained under Rudolf Steiner and Marie Steiner-von Sivers.

Unlike other eurythmy schools, the American Eurythmy School emphasizes the transformation of the thinking life by the student—something indicated by Rudolf Steiner as necessary for a strong foundation and healthy development of the eurythmist's artistic instrument. Study of anthroposophy and related subjects are equally emphasized along with the studies in eurythmy.

The American Eurythmy School maintains a position of independence from the general structures and leadership of the worldwide Anthroposophical Society, as well as from other streams of eurythmy work in America. As a result, its four-year diplomas are not yet recognized by the Eurythmy Association of North America or the Artistic Section of the Anthroposophical Society in Dornach, Switzerland.
