= Else Klink =

German eurythmist (1907–1994)

Else Klink (23 October 1907 in Kabakada, Bismarck Archipelago – 18 October 1994 in Köngen, Germany) was director of the Eurythmeum Stuttgart, the first training centre for Eurythmy founded by Marie Steiner in 1923, from 1935 until 1991. In 1945, she established the Eurythmeum Stage Group, which she also led until 1991. Her work contributed centrally to establishing Eurythmy as a performing art within the culture of Europe and internationally.

== First experiences in Eurythmy ==
The eldest daughter of Hans August Lorenz Klink, a northern German senior colonial official, and Nawjamba Ambo, an indigenous New Guinean, Else Klink grew up on Kabakada, a New Guinean islands. While attending a German girls' school, Else lived with friends of her family in Freiburg im Breisgau. When her foster parents died in June 1917, she was taken in by Anna Wolffhügel, a teacher of Eurythmy. Anna's husband, Max Wolffhügel, a painter and later Waldorf teacher in Stuttgart, became leader of the Anthroposophical Branch in Freiburg in 1918 and he invited Rudolf Steiner to lecture on 19 August 1919. Rudolf Steiner recommended that the children take Eurythmy lessons from Alice Fels, who was holding classes in Freiburg.

From 1921 to 1926, Else Klink attended the first Waldorf school at the Uhlandshöhe in Stuttgart, where her talent for Eurythmy was identified. In 1924, she began taking a reduced load of other classes and spent most of her day in Eurythmy classes with Alice Fels, then leader of the Eurythmeum that stood next door to the school.

In October 1929 she went to the Netherlands to introduce Eurythmy there. Together with Wilhelmina Stigter, Klink fought the odds of a foreign language, long-distance commuting and only a small number of interested learners. In 1930 they held a first performance, in which she asked the dramatist, director and speaker, Otto Wiemer, to recite and direct. It marked the beginning of a 30-year collaboration in which he was her artistic partner and advisor, lasting until Wiemer's death in 1960. For five years she built up the Eurythmy work in the Netherlands, then became seriously ill in 1934 and was forced to leave.

== The Eurythmeum ==
Then, in 1935, Marie Steiner sent her to Stuttgart to set up the Eurythmeum once again, which had been discontinued in 1930, and confirmed her as its director.

Starting in 1936 the authorities of the Third Reich began to severely curtail the practice of Eurythmy. Klink tried to save her school and travelled to Berlin to negotiate. She managed to come to an agreement that the training could continue, and "Eurythmie" was given a sub-category under the heading of dance. However, all performing of Eurythmy was banned and the diplomas issued had to be ratified by the Reichstheaterkammer. Unobtrusively, Klink ran courses for 40 students over the next six years. When, on 8 July 1941, her students had successfully completed their program and their diplomas, "decorated" with the required swastika, were returned on 2 August 1941, they were no longer of any value. Eurythmy had been forbidden and the school had to close.

She was then required to do three years of "Women's War Service" in a parachute factory. When on 12 September 1944, Stuttgart was bombed and the building of the Eurythmeum destroyed, she left the city and found asylum in the village Gundelfingen on the Swabian Alp, where she could practice in an empty barn. Realising the Third Reich would soon be over, she convinced her pianist (Gertrud Födisch) and speaker (Otto Wiemer), to join her, preparing a large tone and speech repertoire for the stage. When the war ended, she and Wiemer returned on foot to Stuttgart and began holding Eurythmy lessons in the hall of the Waldorf School.

On 8 November 1945, the first performance took place in a factory building, after which she received a number of requests for training and founded the Eurythmeum Stage Ensemble. As the Eurythmeum building was a mound of rubble, she moved to Köngen where she and Otto Wiemer were able to build up a stage and start a Eurythmy school in old army barracks her principal supporter, Emil Kühn, had been able to secure from the American occupation army. Fortuitously, the American commander was Captain John Fentress Gardner, an anthroposophist and well aware of the art of Eurythmy. In 1948, they founded an association for the fostering of Eurythmy. They called the provisional setting of their school "Private Eurythmy Conservatory Köngen", having done all this in isolation from the rest of the world.

In 1947, she was finally able to report on what had happened to Marie Steiner in Switzerland, communication having been cut off for nearly ten years. Marie Steiner, the person responsible for the anthroposophical performing arts, bestowed on her the unrestricted rights to all future activities in Eurythmy. That same year the group gave 17 performances in Wurtemberg and eight in the Ruhrgebiet with a varied program. By 1950 the number had risen to some 50 per year.

== Performing Eurythmy ==
In 1959, the Eurythmeum was rebuilt next door to the Rudolf Steiner House in Stuttgart with its own financial trust, securing the means for a larger stage group and the incorporation of live orchestral music. Klink worked on the preparation of student Eurythmists and the stage group with a vision of building an organisation and repertoire that could make Eurythmy known throughout the world. In 1961 the Eurythmy premiere of Schubert's 8th Symphony (Unfinished Symphony) took place; in 1974 first performance tour in Romania and through Germany at the invitation of the Romanian Philharmonia Arad.

In 1975, she was invited to the "Festival de la Danse" in Paris to represent Germany. In 1976 and 1978, she toured again with the Romanian Philharmonia Arad through Germany following with a tour through the United States and Canada and 1979 through seven cities in Romania, including the Congressional Palace in Bucharest with its 3000 seats. By this time every performance was packed wherever she went.

In 1986, she received the Order of Merit of the Federal Republic of Germany. She continued to organise international tours, with two additional ones in America.

In 1991, she handed over the direction of the Eurythmeum to a group of her co-workers and teachers. In 1992, the Eurythmy ensemble was renamed in her honour as the Else Klink Ensemble. She continued to live until 1994 in the "Villa Kühn" in Köngen, where she died on 18 October 1994, five days before her 87th birthday.

== Published work ==
- Bühnenkunst 1/90 Verlag Urachhaus Johannes M. Mayer GmbH, Stuttgart, (1990) ASIN B00J18BGY6
- Bühnenkunst 2/90 Verlag Urachhaus Johannes M. Mayer GmbH, Stuttgart, (1990) ASIN B00J18BHE0

== Literature ==
- Magdalene Siegloch How the New Art of Eurythmy Began: Lory Maier-Smits, the First Eurythmist Temple Lodge Publishing (1998) ISBN 978-0904693904
- Thomas Poplawski Eurythmy Rhythm, Dance (Rudolf Steiner's Ideas in Practice Series) Kindle Edition Steiner Books (1997) ASIN B0024FB4UY
- Wolfgang Veit: Eurythmie, Else Klink – ihr Wirken in einer neuen Bühnenkunst Urachhaus (Stuttgart), 1985, ISBN 978-3878384403
- I. Rüchardt: Else Klink. Zu ihrer 40jährigen Lehrtätigkeit. In: MaD 1969, Nr. 90
- Erika Beltle (Editor): Gestalt und Bewegung. Festschrift für Else Klink, Stuttgart, Verlag Freies Geistesleben, 1977, ISBN 3-7725-0683-6.
- H. Gundelach: Else Klink und das Eurythmeum Stuttgart. In: Eurythmeum Stuttgart, Stuttgart [1987]
- Hans Reipert: Eurythmische Korrespondenz, Verlag Otanes, ISBN 3-931370-70-4
- Eurythmeum Stuttgart Im Gedenken an Else Klink (In Memory of Else Klink) Stuttgart : Eurythmeum, (1994) ASIN 0085GYN5O
- Eurythmeum Stuttgart Eine Hommage. Lichtspuren zum 100. Geburtstag von Else Klink Eurythmeum (2007) ASIN B007JVSBF4
