= Elisabeth Vreede =

Dutch scientist

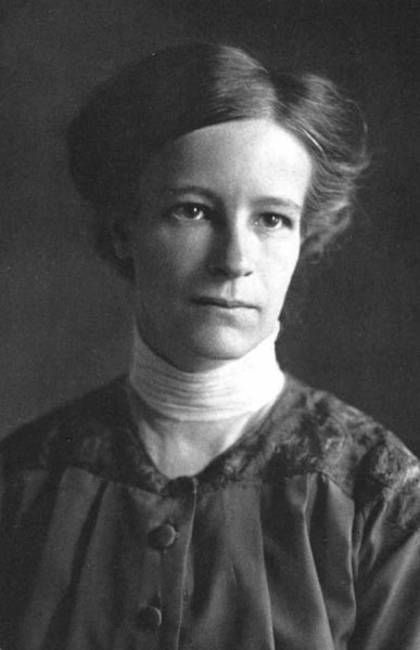
Elisabeth Vreede

Elisabeth Vreede (16 July 1879, in The Hague – 31 August 1943, in Ascona) was a Dutch mathematician, astronomer and anthroposophist.

== Early life and education ==
Elisabeth Vreede was born in The Hague in 1879. She was her parents' second child. Her father was a lawyer and her mother devoted her time to charitable work. She was a sensitive person and later on played an important part in the Anthroposophical life in the Netherlands.

Elisabeth Vreede came into contact with Theosophy in her home growing up. She was interested early on in the starry sky, read the works of Camille Flammarion and learned French at the same time. She first went to school at the age of seven. She completed her years in primary and higher schools and afterwards took private studies for two years, so as to gain qualifications for university entrance.

At the University of Leyden she studied mathematics, astronomy, philosophy (especially Hegel) and Sanskrit. She was also actively involved in student life, founding a boatclub, and was a council member of the students' union.

Her first meeting with Rudolf Steiner took place at the Theosophical Congress in London in 1903. Her parents were theosophists and she, too, was a member of the Theosophical Society. At the congress Rudolf Steiner straightaway made a great impression on her. A year later she heard Steiner's lecture on 'Mathematics and Occultism' given at the Congress of the Federation of European Sections of the Theosophical Society at Amsterdam in 1904. The next European Congress was in 1906 when Steiner held a cycle of 18 lectures there.

== Teaching and anthroposophy ==
After receiving her diploma in 1906, she gave instruction in mathematics at a higher girls school until 1910. From 1910, she lived in Berlin, working on her dissertation and occasionally working as a secretary for Rudolf Steiner. In April 1914 she moved to Dornach to help in the work for the first Goetheanum, where she would often be found carving the wood required for the building.

M. P. van Deventer who would become Vreede's biographer first met her in the summer of 1915. She was living with her parents in a small house in Neu-Reinach. From an elevated position there was a beautiful view over the building and over the chain of the Canton of Jura, with the Gempen.

During the War years 1916/17 Elisabeth Vreede broke off from her residence in Dornach to work in Berlin as a coworker of Elisabeth Rotten, caring for prisoners of war.

After the War, Rudolf Steiner developed his idea of the threefold social order. Vreede had an intense interest in this initiative and work and she was the first to bring this idea to England. Around 1918 she began to construct the library and archive at the Goetheanum, using her own means to purchase the expensive lecture transcripts as soon as they were typed from the stenogram. Occasionally friends contributed to her efforts to build an archive.

In 1920 Vreede moved to Arlesheim where she had built a small house of her own. It was the second dwelling-house for which Rudolf Steiner himself had given the model in 1919. There, in Arlesheim, Ita Wegman founded the first anthroposophical medical clinic in 1921.

In December 1923 Vreede was appointed as leader of the Mathematical-Astronomical Section of the School of Spiritual Science at the Goetheanum. She belonged to the board of directors (Vorstand) of the General Anthroposophical Society from December 1923 to 1935. In 1924 she attended the Agriculture Course of Rudolf Steiner at Koberwitz which laid the foundations for the development of biodynamic agriculture. Between September 1927 and August 1930, in her capacity as leader of the Mathematical-Astronomical Section, she wrote a monthly letter, then available by subscription, about both modern astronomy and classical astrology in the light of spiritual science. The letters included explanations of the fundamentals of astronomy and discussions of astrology in the modern world, with reference to such topics as nutation, precession of the equinoxes, comets, solar eclipses and lunar eclipses and the meaning of the Christian holidays such as Easter and Whitsun. The Letters in English translation were published in 2007 with the title Astronomy and Spiritual Science.

On 9 and 11 July 1930 she held two lectures in Stuttgart with the title The Bodhisattva Question in the History of the Anthroposophical Society, published in English translation in 1993.

== Later life ==
When the separation within the Anthroposophical Society took place in 1935 Vreede was expelled from the Vorstand and her Section passed into other hands. This resulted after internal discussions in the Anthroposophical Society. On her exclusion from the Vorstand along with Ita Wegman, Vreede was cut off from the observatory and archives that she herself helped assemble.

The last years of her life became more lonely. She was cut off from her friends abroad by the War. The death of Ita Wegman at the beginning of March, 1943, was a great shock for her. At the internal commemoration in the clinic she spoke words at her eulogy. It was the first time she faced her former colleagues on the Vorstand.

On the anniversary of Rudolf Steiner's death (30 March) she spoke to the circle of friends and co-workers in Ita Wegman's clinic at Arlesheim. They wanted to commemorate not just Rudolf Steiner but also the many who had been leading Anthroposophists but who to most were no longer known. She spoke in a devoted way of Edith Maryon, and with a fine characterization of her being about Alice Sauerwein. She portrayed Count Keyserlingk and Louis Werbeck. Finally she told about Caroline von Heydebrand and Eugen Kolisko.

At the beginning of May she spoke once more on the 400th anniversary of the death of Copernicus. At the lecture it was noticed that only by exceptional exertion could she keep herself upright. A few days later, on 6 May, she had to take her bed. She, who had never before been ill nor depended on people, was treated at home thanks to the devoted care of Frl. Schunemann.

It was a case of septic disease. Phases of high fever with shivering fits repeatedly recurred. Nourishment could not be taken and complications supervened, like cardiac insuffiency and blood-poisoning. For her treatment Dr. Kaelin and Dr. Martin stood beside her biographer, M. P. van Deventer, with advice and help. The septicaemia spread rapidly. After a slight improvement she went finally to Ascona, where the Casa Andrea Cristoforo clinic had been founded by Ita Wegman, and died there on 31 August 1943. .
