= Anne Macky =

Australian occultist

Anne Macky (1887–1964) was an Australian occultist, student of and co-author with Aleister Crowley of the influential Crowleian book on Thelemic magick, Magick Without Tears.

== Anthroposophy ==
In 1922, Macky became committed to Anthroposophy as a result of hearing lectures given by Rudolf Steiner at the Oxford Conference. Macky established, together with the Italian artist Ernesto Genoni, regular Anthroposophy meetings in Melbourne from 1928 and they founded the Michael Group, a branch of the Anthroposophical Society in Melbourne in 1932.

== Collaboration with Aleister Crowley ==
Crowley's Magick Without Tears was begun in 1943 and consists of Crowley's answers to questions from "an unnamed female pupil", referred to in the magical literature as The Unknown Soror. The primary correspondent was Anne Macky, whose A∴A∴ motto was Fiat Yod.

On 18 August, she informed him in a letter that her motto was in fact Fiat and the letter four, which is Yod, producing Soror "Fiat Yod", (811+20=831). The motto he came up with for her and the one she discovered on her own have the exact same numeration. Crowley accepted Fiat Yod as her motto and she is often referenced by a simple "FY" in his journals from that point on.

In late June 1943, Macky's correspondence with Crowley shows they discussed magick and a certain rite. From the information in his journals we can say she was undoubtedly a member of the A∴A∴ and was interested in joining the O.T.O. He sent her O.T.O. contact information for people who would initiate her into the order. She inquired further requesting more personal information about these members and he responded by telling her that the path is an individual one, that the O.T.O. was not a social organization.

In his journals Crowley states that he struck a bargain with Macky. He paid her the sum of 20 pounds on 26 October 1943. She was to write 50 letters with questions for him to answer and they would eventually be put into a book, Magick Without Tears. She accepted, and by 10 November of that same year he was working on responding to her eighth letter.

I am arranging to send you the official papers connected to the O.T.O. but the idea that you should meet other members first is quite impossible. Even after affiliation, you would not meet anyone unless it were necessary for you to work in cooperation with them. I am afraid you have still got the idea that the Great Work is a tea-party. Contact with other students only means that you criticize their hats, and then their morals; and I am not going to encourage this. Your work is not anybody else’s; and undirected chatter is the worst poisonous element in a humane society. – Aleister Crowley, Magick Without Tears.

One thing is certain, it is safe to say that the “Unknown Soror” mentioned by Karl Germer in his introduction to Magick Without Tears, undoubtedly now has a name, and she is Anne Macky, Soror Fiat Yod.
