= Dorneck Castle =

Castle in Dornach, Switzerland

- Dornach
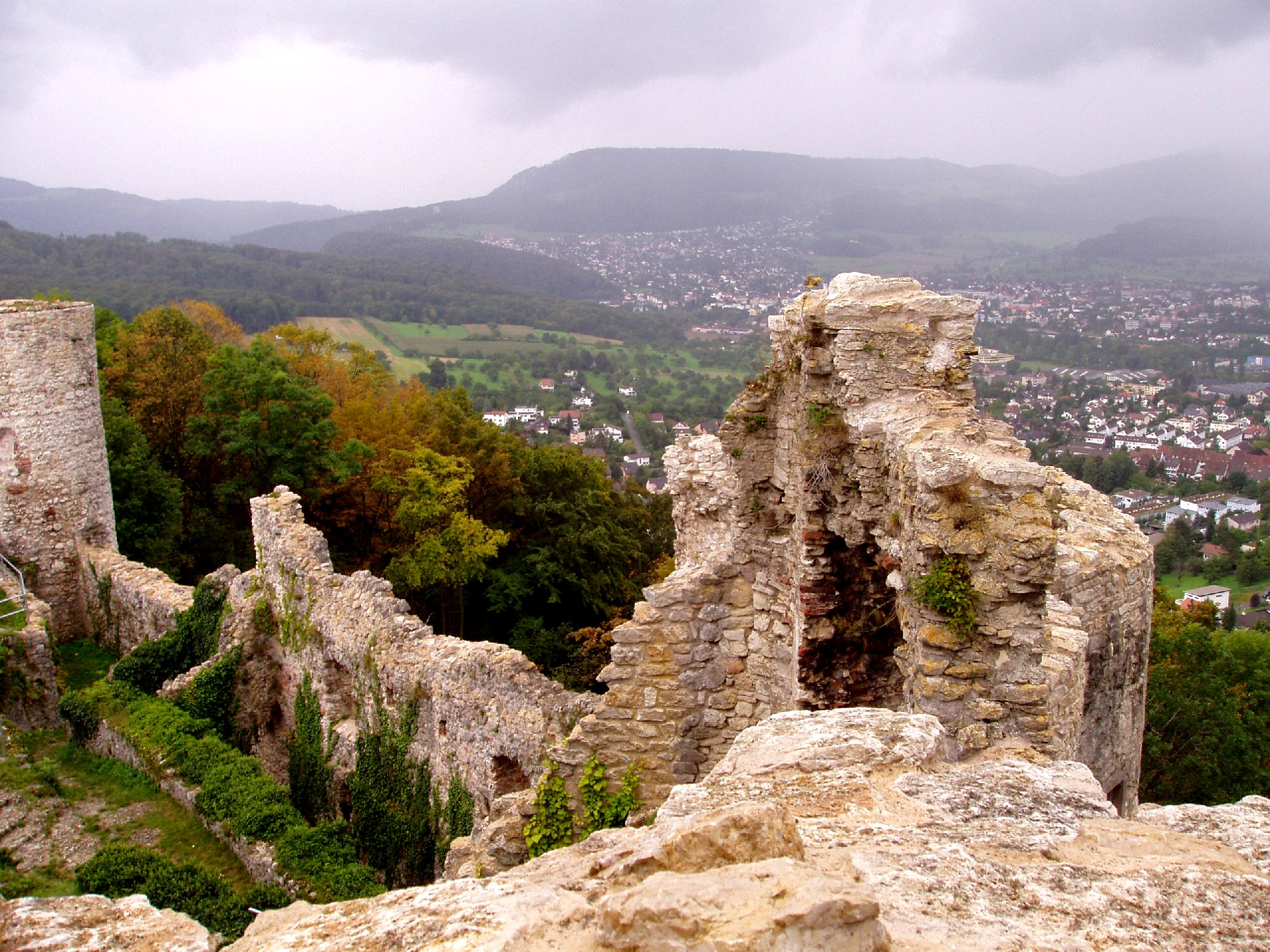
- Ruins of Dorneck Castle

Site information
- Type: hill castle
- Code: CH-SO
- Condition: ruin

Location
- Coordinates: 47°28′47.97″N 07°37′41.05″E
- Height: 490 m above the sea

Site history
- Built: c. 1050

Dorneck Castle is a castle in the municipality of Dornach of the Canton of Solothurn in Switzerland. It is a Swiss heritage site of national significance.

== See also ==
- List of castles in Switzerland
