= John Fentress Gardner =

American author and educator

John Fentress Gardner (1912–1998) was an American author and educator.

He wrote about education, spiritualism, and anthroposophy. He was the longtime headmaster of what is now called The Waldorf School of Garden City.

During his tenure as headmaster, the school was called "The Demonstration School of Adelphi College" and then the "Waldorf School of Garden City". The school is based on the teachings of Rudolf Steiner, a European proponent of alternative education, clairvoyance and mysticism.

He was married to Carol Hemingway Gardner, who was Ernest Hemingway's youngest sister.

== Selected works ==
- "American Heralds of the Spirit" (Hudson, NY: Lindisfarne Press, 1992),
- "Education in Search of the Spirit" (Hudson, NY: Anthroposophic Press, 1996),
- "The Experience of Knowledge: The Founding of Adelphi’s Waldorf School" (New York: The Myrin Institute Inc., 1962)
- "One Man's Vision: In Memoriam, H.A.W. Myrin" (New York: The Myrin Institute Inc., 1970),
- "The Idea of Man in America" (New York: The Myrin Institute, 1974),
- "Two Paths to the Spirit: Charismatic Christianity and Anthroposophy" (Great Barrington, MA: Golden Stone Press, 1990).
