= Uhlandshöhe =

Hill in Baden-Württemberg, Germany

Coordinates: 48°47′03″N 9°11′46″E

Highest point
- Elevation: 355 m (1,165 ft)

Geography
- Location: Baden-Württemberg, Germany

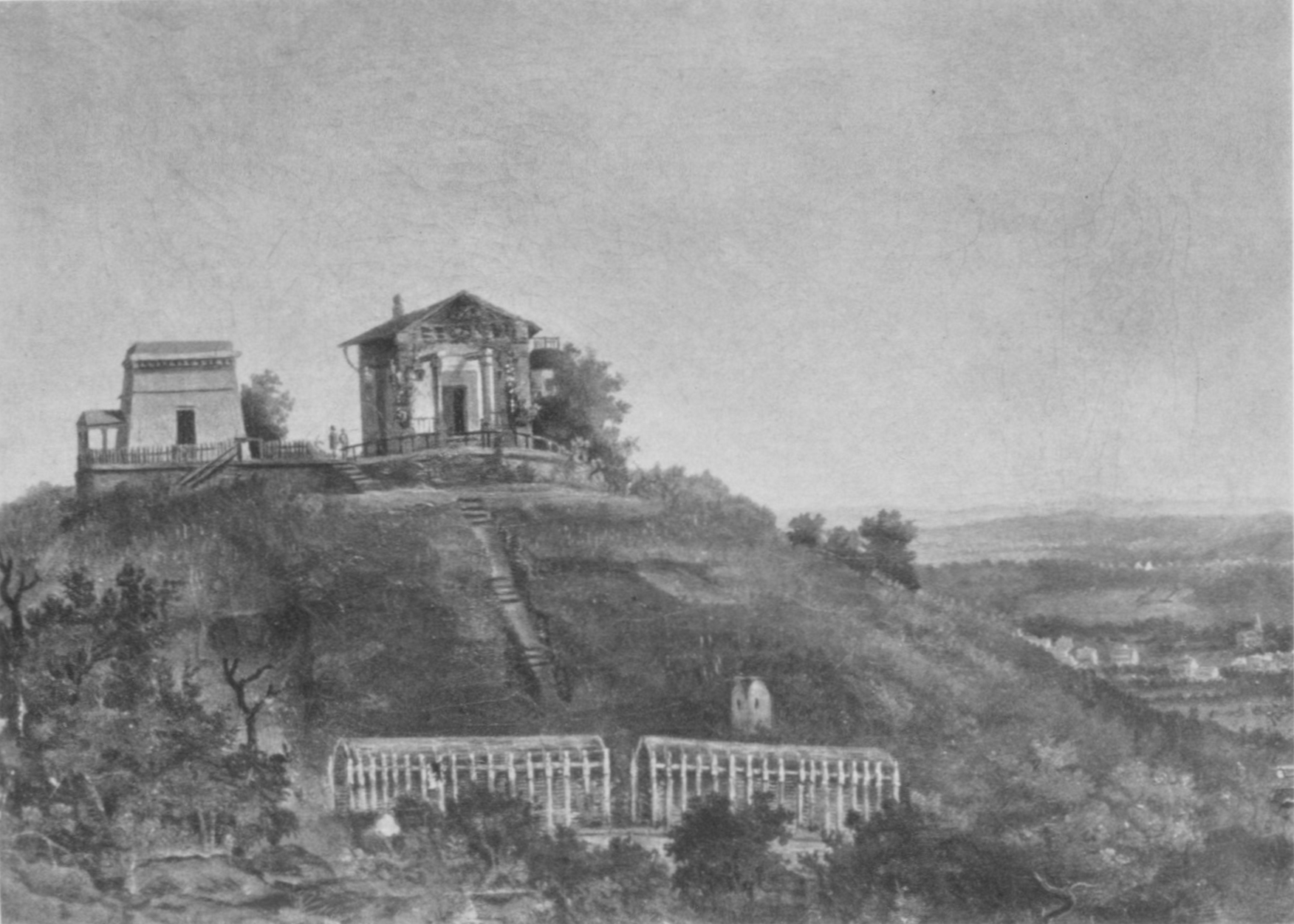
Uhlandshöhr circa 1860

The Uhlandshöhe is a hill in Baden-Württemberg, Germany.

The Uhlandshöhe in Stuttgart is a hill on the eastern edge of the city centre. The name of the hill was originally the Ameisenberg ("Ant Hill"), but in 1862 the name of a park was given to the whole area. Together with the districts of Gaisburg, Berg, Gablenberg, Ostheim, Frauenkopf, Stöckach and Gänsheide, it has been part of the inner city district of Stuttgart-Ost since 2001.

The Uhlandshöhe lies roughly in the triangle formed by the city centre, the historic quarter of Bad Cannstatt (on the River Neckar) and the Gänsheide.
