= Anthroposophical Society =

Spiritual organization

- Allgemeine Anthroposophische Gesellschaft
- Abbreviation: AS
- Formation: 1912 / 1923
- Founder: Rudolf Steiner
- Headquarters: Dornach SO, Switzerland
- Members: 46,157 in 35 national societies and 39 groups
- Board of directors: Justus Wittich, Joan Sleigh, Constanza Kaliks, Matthias Girke
- Website: www.goetheanum.org

The General Anthroposophical Society is an "association of people whose will it is to nurture the life of the soul, both in the individual and in human society, on the basis of a true knowledge of the spiritual world." As an organization, it is dedicated to supporting the community of those interested in the inner path of schooling known as anthroposophy, developed by Rudolf Steiner.

The Anthroposophical Society was founded on December 28, 1912 in Cologne, Germany, with about 3000 members. Central to this founding was Rudolf Steiner, who acted as an advisor and lecturer. The members of its original Executive Council were Marie von Sivers, Michael Bauer, and Carl Unger. The Society was re-founded as the General Anthroposophical Society in 1923/4 in Dornach, Switzerland. It includes an esoteric School of Spiritual Science.

The Society's headquarters is at the Goetheanum, located in Dornach, Solothurn, Switzerland. The Society has national Societies in many countries, including every English-speaking country. Its primary activities include organizing members' meetings and conferences, supporting research, and providing communication channels for a variety of purposes. The Society also encourages sustainable initiatives in the many practical fields in which its members are active.

As of 2013, the Society has approximately 52,000 members. Formal branches of the Society have been established in 50 countries, and smaller groups are active in 50 further countries. About 10,000 institutions base their work on anthroposophy, including schools, farms, medical practices, and communities for disabled people.

== Origins ==
The Anthroposophical Society traces its history back to 1902, when Rudolf Steiner became General Secretary of the German branch of the Theosophical Society. Prior to this time, Theosophy had made little headway in Germany; despite some visits by Helena Blavatsky, a founder of the Theosophical Society, to Germany and its prominent Theosophists, it was not until after her death in 1891 that a single Berlin Lodge was officially chartered in 1894. Its nominal leadership by Wilhelm Hübbe-Schleiden was supported by the ongoing efforts of Count and Countess Brockdorff, under whose auspices Steiner was first asked to lecture to an audience including German Theosophists in August 1900. His spiritual ideas found a responsive audience here, as many German Theosophists had found in Theosophy only an imperfect reflection of their own beliefs.

Throughout Steiner's term in office, the German branch worked quite independently of the rest of the Theosophical Society; in particular, Steiner sought to link to European philosophy and science and to Christian esoteric traditions, while the Theosophical Society was both geographically and spiritually based in Adyar, India.

Besant's tolerance for the differences in their approaches grew strained over the years. By 1907, Steiner had shifted from Theosophical terminology to his own vocabulary, and the uniqueness of his approach was becoming increasingly apparent, for example at the International Congress at Munich in May 1907. Later that year, "by mutual consent", the esoteric circle Steiner had founded as an offshoot of the Theosophical Society's Esoteric Section (E. S.) became a wholly independent institution.

Gathering tensions over a variety of issues, including the rapid growth of the German section and its increasing activity in areas outside of Germany, came to a head when the leadership of the Theosophical Society declared that they had found the reincarnated Christ in a young boy named Jiddu Krishnamurti. Followers of Krishnamurti, most of whom were Theosophists, founded the Order of the Star in the East in 1911. Steiner's opposition to this order was made unmistakable by his 1912 declaration that no member of the new Order could remain a member of the German Theosophical Society. By the end of that year, Besant had induced the General Council of the Theosophical Society to revoke the charter for the German Section, which was under Steiner's leadership. In February 1913, Steiner and a group of prominent German theosophists founded a new society, the Anthroposophical Society, with the intent of pursuing a more Western path of spirituality than that nurtured in the Theosophical Society.

The German branch had numbered only a single Lodge and a few individual members when Steiner became its head in 1902. By 1913, it had burgeoned to 69 Lodges, 55 of which (about 2,500 people) left with Steiner to be part of the new Anthroposophical Society. The General Council of the Theosophical Society issued a new charter to the 14 Lodges which remained in the Theosophical Society, which were once again led by Hübbe-Schleiden. The early Anthroposophical Society was predominantly German-speaking, though there were some founding members from other European countries, particularly the Netherlands. Its inaugural general meeting was held in January 1913 at Berlin. English anthroposophy was limited to a small anonymous club until after World War I.

After a split occurred between younger members, many of whom were founding or active in new initiatives such as a school, a curative home for the handicapped, a medical clinic, and a farm, and who had formed their own "Free Anthroposophical Society", and the older members, the anthroposophical society was formally refounded, with new leadership, in December 1923. Both groups came together in the new version of the society.

A conference was first called to refound the society. At this conference, which became known as the Christmas Conference, Steiner suggested that a meditative verse he had created for the occasion, the Foundation Stone Meditation, should become the spiritual cornerstone of a renewed anthroposophical movement. This movement should for the first time become unified with the Society that nurtured it. At this time, the Anthroposophical Society was renamed as the General Anthroposophical Society and affiliated national societies were formed.

Steiner gave a series of lectures on world history over the course of the eight-day conference, and established a School of Spiritual Science as his esoteric school, which became a new focus for 'esoteric' commitment and authority. While there was no requirement for membership in the General Anthroposophic Society, First Class members had to have been members of the General Society for 2 years, and accept 'inner responsibility' for Anthroposophy."

== History ==
As Cristina Burack put it, "Steiner's contradictory views meant that anthroposophy was both attractive and a threat to the Nazi movement." According to Staudenmaier, "He sometimes held antisemitic views and philosemitic views at the same time". On November 1, 1935, the National Socialist regime banned the society in Germany for its "close relations with foreign freemasons, Jews and pacifists." The order issued by Reinhard Heydrich stated that, as a result of its opposition to the National Socialistic idea of Volk, the activities of the Anthroposophical Society endangered the National Socialistic state. Jewish teachers at the Waldorf schools were consequently dismissed. Jehovah's Witnesses were treated much more aggressively than Anthroposophists. (Note: Meaning that after 1942, Jehovah's Witnesses were spared from harsh treatment. Jehovah's Witnesses could escape persecution and personal harm by signing a document indicating renunciation of their faith, submission to state authority, and support of the German military.)

From the 1930s until the 1960s, disputes over two separate issues, publishing rights for Steiner's books and the spiritual direction of the society, led to the Anthroposophical Society being effectively divided into several groups with little connection. Through efforts on all sides, the splinter groups merged again into the present Society in the early 1960s. While married to Marie Steiner-von Sivers, Steiner had a mistress, Ita Wegman. After Steiner's death, the Anthroposophical Society was divided between his wife and his mistress.

== Organization ==
=== United States ===
The Anthroposophical Society in America, headquartered in Ann Arbor, Michigan, is one of over seventy national societies of the international General Anthroposophical Society, headquartered at the Goetheanum in Dornach, Switzerland. The American Society has branches, groups, and sections in over 36 states.

The goal of the Anthroposophical Society in America is to further the work of Rudolf Steiner. It is a non-sectarian, non-political association devoted to such ends. It supports study groups, regional branches, the School for Spiritual Science in North America, and the Rudolf Steiner Library.

The administrative offices for the U.S. Society are located at the Rudolf Steiner House, 1923 Geddes Avenue, Ann Arbor, Michigan.

The U.S. Society is governed by a General Council. Current members of the General Council are

- Mary Stewart Adams, General Secretary and President
- Leah Walker, Secretary
- Gino Ver Eecke, Interim Chair and Eastern Region Representative
- Christine Burke, Western Region Representative
- Margaret Runyon, Member at large.

A partial list of branches follows:

- The Chicago Branch
- The Los Angeles Branch
- The New York City Branch
- The Seattle Branch

=== Great Britain ===
The Anthroposophical Society in Great Britain, headquartered in Rudolf Steiner House in London, is one of over seventy national societies of the international General Anthroposophical Society, headquartered at the Goetheanum in Dornach, Switzerland. The ASinGB has branches, groups, and sections all across Great Britain.

There is a separate society for Ireland.

== Principles ==
The founding principles of the society were:

1. The Anthroposophical Society is to be an association of people whose will it is to nurture the life of the soul, both in the individual and in human society, on the basis of a true knowledge of the spiritual world.
2. The persons gathered at the Goetheanum in Dornach at Christmas, 1923, both the individuals and the groups represented, form the nucleus of the Society. They are convinced that there exists in our time a genuine science of the spiritual world, elaborated for years past, and in important particulars already published; and that the civilisation of today is lacking the cultivation of such a science. This cultivation is to be the task of the Anthroposophical Society. It will endeavour to fulfill this task by making the anthroposophical spiritual science cultivated at the Goetheanum in Dornach the centre of its activities, together with all that results from this for brotherhood in human relationships and for the moral and religious as well as the artistic and cultural life.
3. The persons gathered in Dornach as the nucleus of the Society recognise and endorse the view of the leadership at the Goetheanum (represented by the Vorstand [Executive Council] formed at the Foundation Meeting): 'Anthroposophy, as fostered at the Goetheanum, leads to results which can serve every human being as a stimulus to spiritual life, whatever his nation, social standing or religion. They can lead to a social life genuinely built on brotherly love. No special degree of academic learning is required to make them one's own and to found one's life upon them, but only an open-minded human nature. Research into these results, however, as well as competent evaluation of them, depends upon spiritual-scientific training, which is to be acquired step by step. These results are in their own way as exact as the results of genuine natural science. When they attain general recognition in the same way as these, they will bring about comparable progress in all spheres of life, not only in the spiritual but also in the practical realm.'
4. The Anthroposophical Society is in no sense a secret society, but is entirely public. Anyone can become a member, without regard to nationality, social standing, religion, scientific or artistic conviction, who considers as justified the existence of an institution such as the Goetheanum in Dornach, in its capacity as a School of Spiritual Science. The Anthroposophical Society rejects any kind of sectarian activity. Party politics it considers not to be within its task.
5. The Anthroposophical Society sees the School of Spiritual Science in Dornach as a centre for its activity. The School will be composed of three classes. Members of the Society will be admitted to the School on their own application after a period of membership to be determined by the leadership at the Goetheanum. They enter in this way the First Class of the School of Spiritual Science. Admission to the Second or Third Classes takes place when the person requesting this is deemed eligible by the leadership at the Goetheanum.
6. Every member of the Anthroposophical Society has the right to attend all lectures, performances and meetings arranged by the society, under conditions to be announced by the Vorstand.
7. The organising of the school of Spiritual Science is, to begin with, the responsibility of Rudolf Steiner, who will appoint his collaborators and his possible successor.
8. All publications of the Society shall be public, in the same sense as are those of other public societies. The publications of the School of Spiritual Science will form no exception as regards this public character; however, the leadership of the School reserves the right to deny in advance the validity of any judgment on these publications which is not based on the same training from which they have been derived. Consequently, they will regard as justified no judgement which is not based on an appropriate preliminary training, as is also the common practice in the recognised scientific world. Thus, the publications of the School of Spiritual Science will bear the following note: 'Printed as manuscript for members of the School of Spiritual Science, Goetheanum, … Class. No one is considered competent to judge the content, who has not acquired - through the School itself or in a manner recognised by the School as equivalent - the requisite preliminary knowledge. Other opinions will be disregarded, to the extent that the authors of such works will not enter into a discussion about them.'
9. The purpose of the Anthroposophical Society will be the furtherance of spiritual research; that of the School of Spiritual Science will be this research itself. A dogmatic stand in any field whatsoever is to be excluded from the Anthroposophical Society.
10. The Anthroposophical Society shall hold a regular General Meeting at the Goetheanum each year, at which time the Vorstand shall present a full report with accounting. The agenda for this meeting shall be communicated by the Vorstand to all members, together with the invitation, six weeks before the meeting. The Vorstand may call special meetings and fix the agenda for them. Invitations to such meetings shall be sent to members three weeks in advance. Motions proposed by individual members or groups of members shall be submitted one week before the General Meeting.
11. Members may join together in smaller or larger groups on any basis of locality or subject. The headquarters of the Anthroposophical Society is at the Goetheanum. From there the Vorstand shall bring to the attention of the members or groups of members what it considers to be the task of the Society. The Vorstand communicates with officials elected or appointed by the various groups. Admission of members will be the concern of the individual groups; the certificate of membership shall, however, be placed before the Vorstand in Dornach, and shall be signed by them out of their confidence in the officials of the groups. In general, every member should join a group. Only those for whom it is quite impossible to find entry to a group should apply directly to Dornach for membership.
12. Membership dues shall be fixed by the individual groups; each group shall, however, submit 15 Swiss Francs for each of its members to the central leadership of the Society at the Goetheanum.
13. Each working group formulates its own statutes, but these must not be incompatible with the Statutes of the Anthroposophical Society.
14. The organ of the society is the weekly "Das Goetheanum", which for this purpose is provided with a supplement containing the official communications of the Society. This enlarged edition of "Das Goetheanum" will be supplied to members of the Anthroposophical Society only.
15. The Founding Vorstand will be:

- President: Dr. Rudolf Steiner
- Vice-President: Albert Steffen
- Recorder: Dr. Ita Wegman
- Members: Marie Steiner and Dr. Elisabeth Vreede
- Secretary and Treasurer: Dr. Guenther Wachsmuth

These principles were originally intended to serve as statutes as well; the legal requirements of registering such societies led to an expanded set of statutes, however.

The only requirement to become a member is to recognize the existence of an institution such as the Goetheanum as justified, as laid out in the Statutes. According to the general secretary of the Anthroposophical Society in Great Britain "There are no prerequisites to being a member. Anyone can join and nothing is expected other than to consider that spiritual science as practiced at the Goetheanum in Switzerland, and other places, is justified. If this were not the case one would be joining the wrong Society."

According to the Waldorf teacher Sune Nordwall, "membership in the Anthroposophical Society is incompatible with membership in any organization advocating nationalist or racists ideals."

== See also ==
- Anthroposophy
- Biodynamic agriculture
- Camphill Movement
- New religious movement
- Threefold social order
- Waldorf education

== Bibliography ==
- Kurlander, Eric (2015). "The Nazi Magicians' Controversy: Enlightenment, "Border Science," and Occultism in the Third Reich". Central European History. 48 (4). [Cambridge University Press, Central European History Society]: 498–522. doi:10.1017/S0008938915000898. ISSN 1569-1616. JSTOR 43965203.
- Staudenmaier, Peter (2014). Between Occultism and Nazism: Anthroposophy and the Politics of Race in the Fascist Era. Aries Book Series. Brill. ISBN 978-90-04-27015-2.
- Zander, Helmut (2011). Rudolf Steiner: Die Biografie (in German). München Zürich: Piper. ISBN 978-3-492-05448-5. OCLC 698166064.
