= Goetheanum =

Building in Dornach in the canton of Solothurn, Switzerland

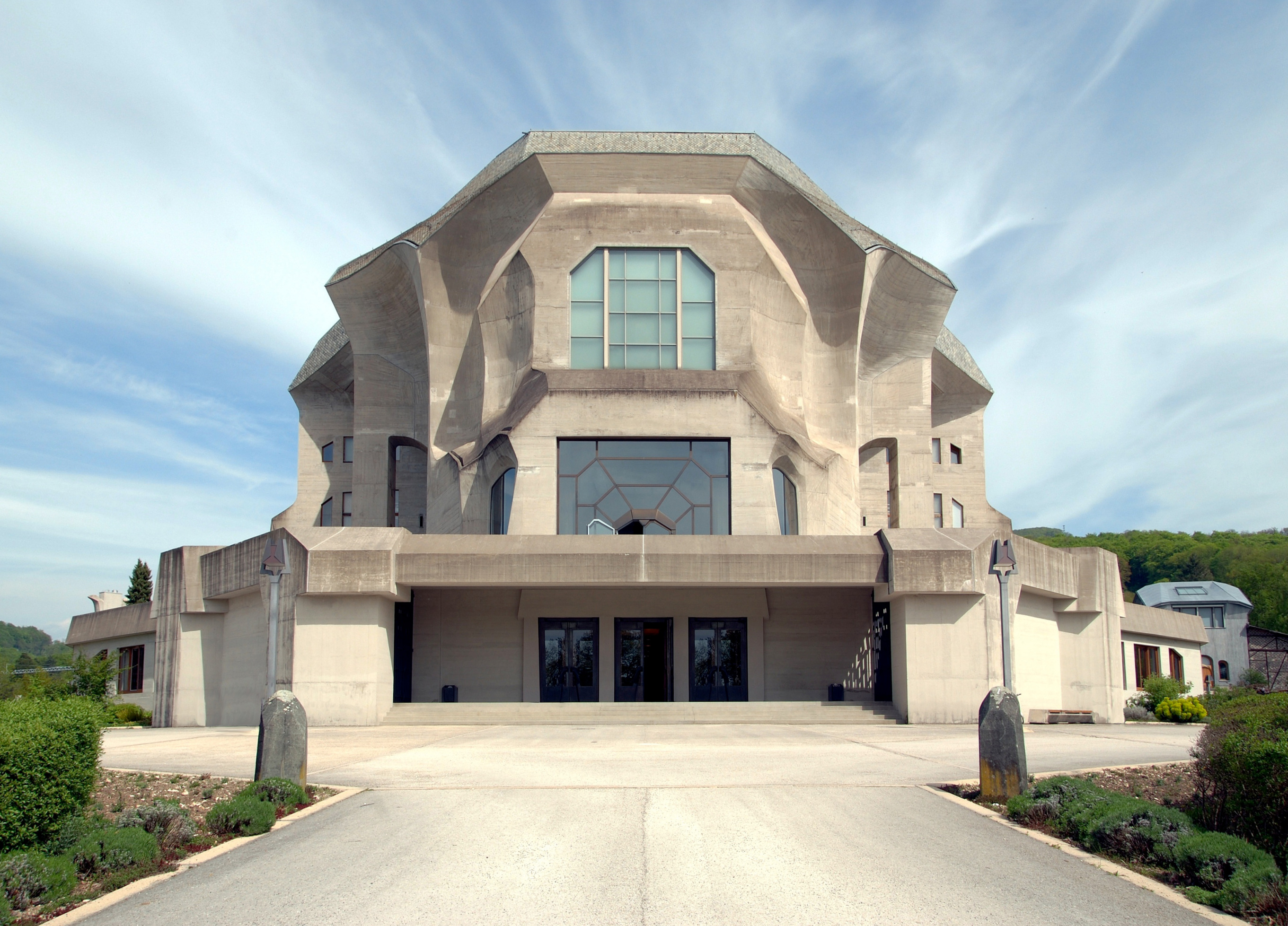

- Location within Switzerland

General information
- Location: Dornach, Switzerland
- Coordinates: 47°29′10″N 7°37′13″E

The Goetheanum, located in Dornach, in the canton of Solothurn, Switzerland, is the world center for the anthroposophical movement. The term refers to two structures, the first was in use 1919 to 1922 and destroyed by fire; the second was completed in 1928 and has been in use since.

The building was designed by Rudolf Steiner, the founder of anthroposophy, and named after Johann Wolfgang von Goethe. It includes two performance halls (1,500 seats), gallery and lecture spaces, a library, a bookstore, and administrative spaces for the Anthroposophical Society; neighboring buildings house the society's research and educational facilities. Conferences focusing on themes of general interest or directed toward teachers, farmers, doctors, therapists, and other professionals are held at the center throughout the year.

The Goetheanum is open for visitors seven days a week and offers tours several times daily.

== First Goetheanum ==
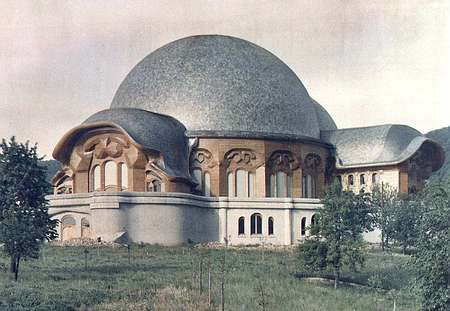
First Goetheanum

The First Goetheanum, a timber and concrete structure designed by Rudolf Steiner, was one of seventeen buildings Steiner designed between 1908 and 1925. It was intended as a Gesamtkunstwerk (the synthesis of diverse artistic media and sensory effects) infused with spiritual significance. Begun in 1913 to house the annual summer theater events of the Anthroposophical Society, it rapidly became the center of a small colony of spiritual seekers located in Dornach and based around Steiner. Numerous visual artists contributed to the building: architects created the unusual double-dome wooden structure over a curving concrete base, stained glass windows added color into the space, painters decorated the ceiling with motifs depicting the whole of human evolution, and sculptors carved huge column bases, capitals, and architraves with images of metamorphoses.

Already during the construction, musicians, actors, and movement artists began performing a wide variety of pieces in a neighboring workshop. When the Goetheanum hall was completed, in 1919, these performances moved onto the stage located under the Goetheanum's smaller cupola. The auditorium was located under the larger cupola. The building was opened on September 26, 1920.

This building was destroyed by fire on New Year's Eve, December 31, 1922 – January 1, 1923, and some claim by arson, but that is not proven.

== Second Goetheanum ==
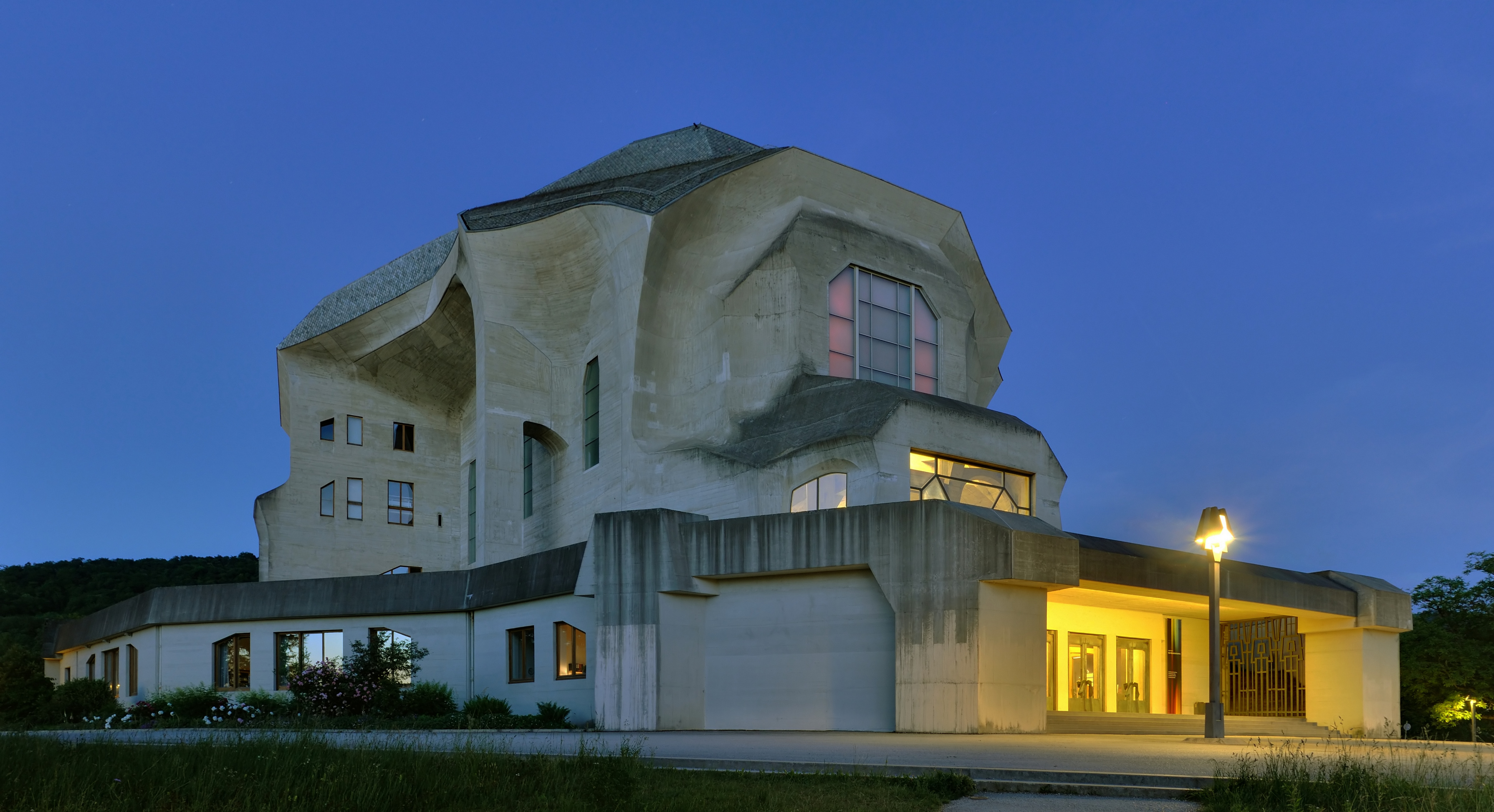
Second Goetheanum, western front and north side at dusk

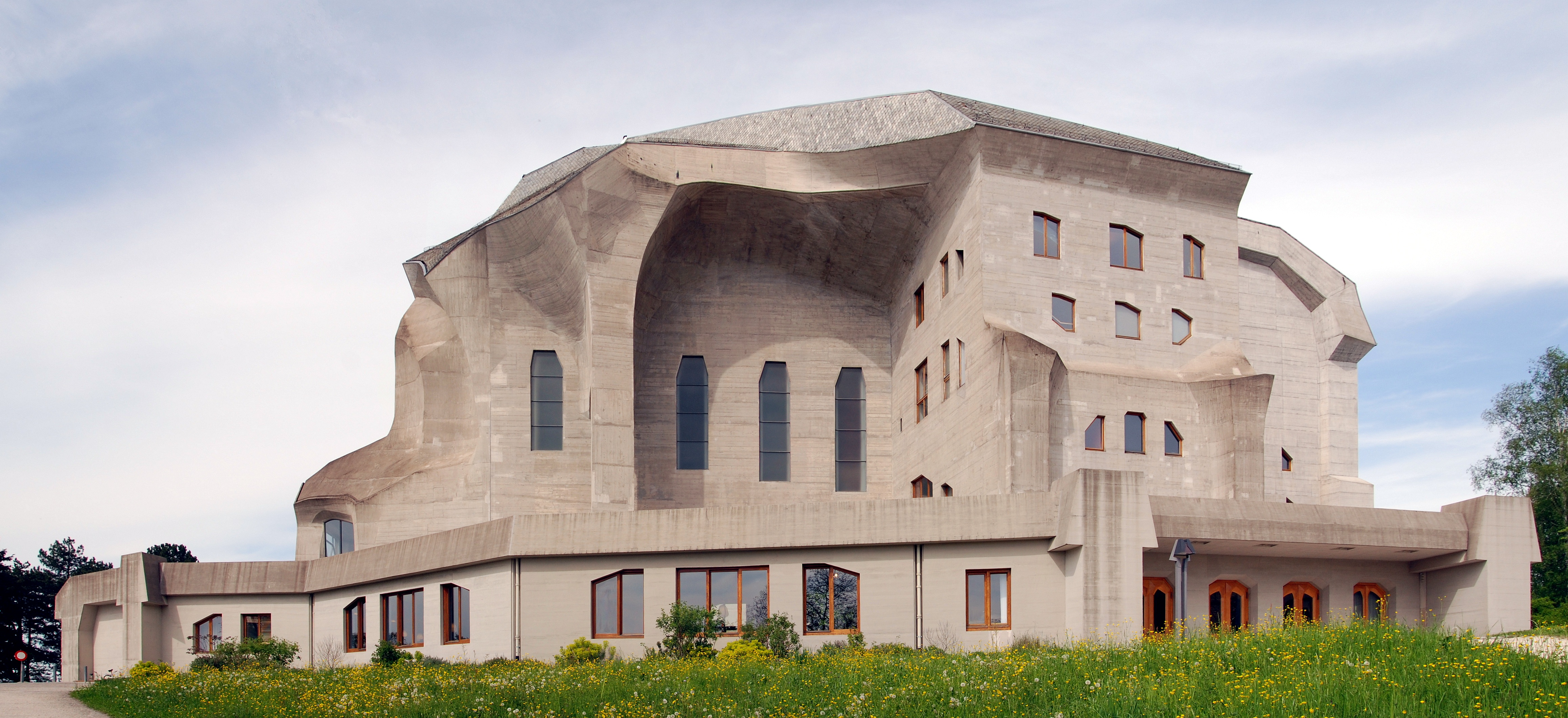
Second Goetheanum, south side view

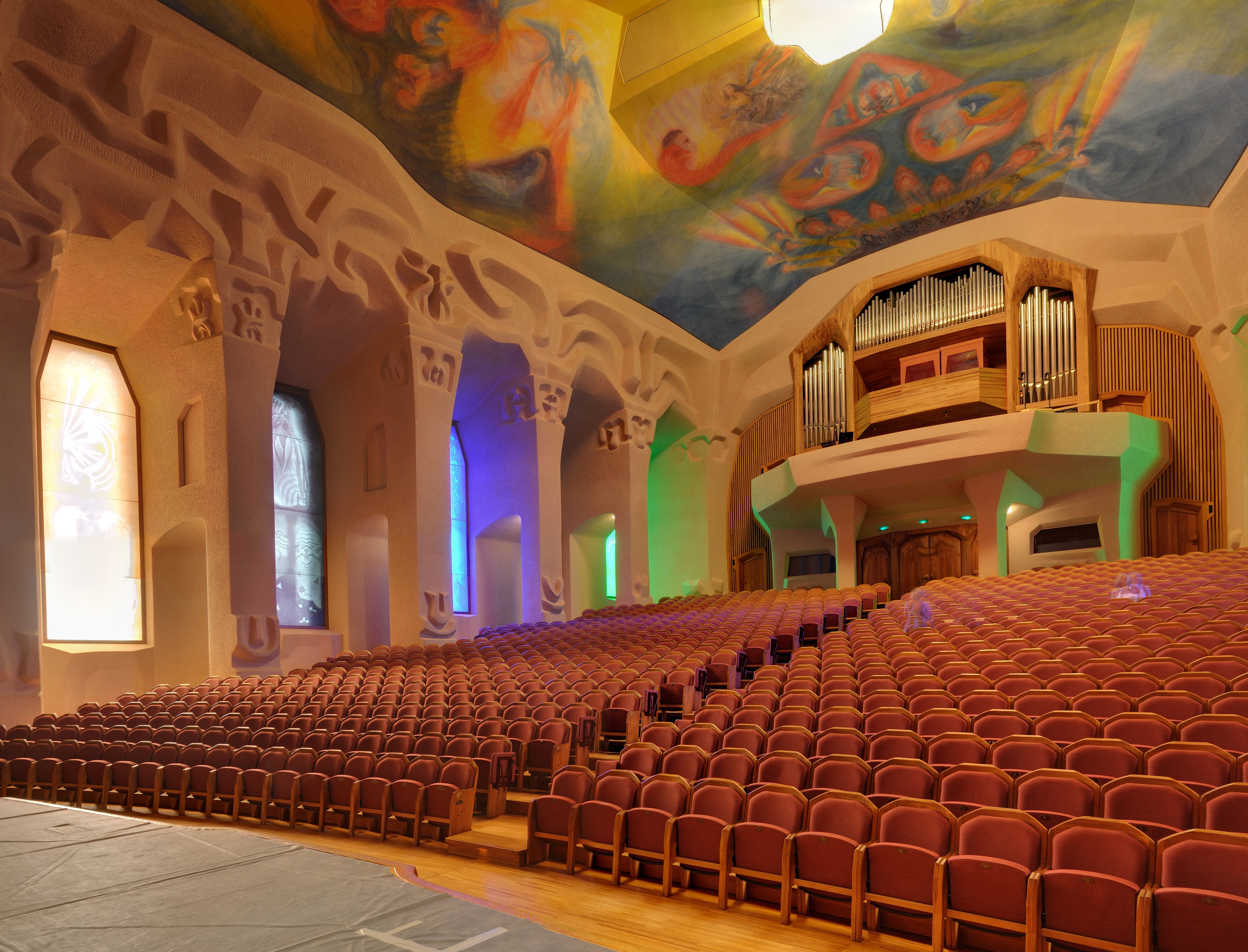
Performance hall showing carved columns, stained-glass windows, and painted ceiling

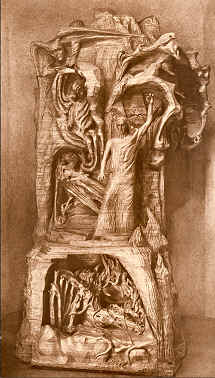
The Representative of Humanity, a sculpture by Steiner and Maryon on view in the building (detail)

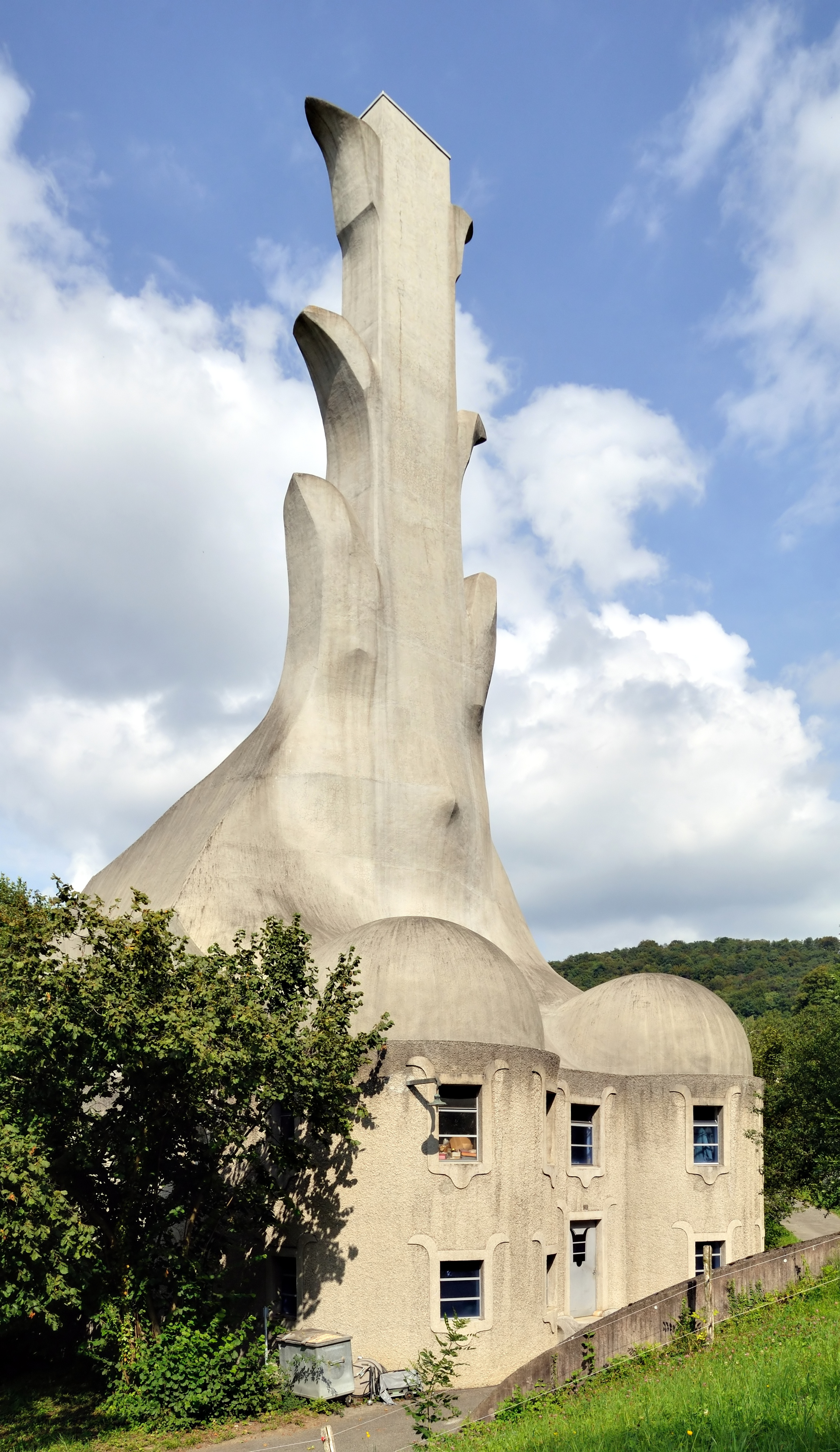
The boiler house, showing its unusual decorative chimney stack

Octocopter flight over the Goetheanum

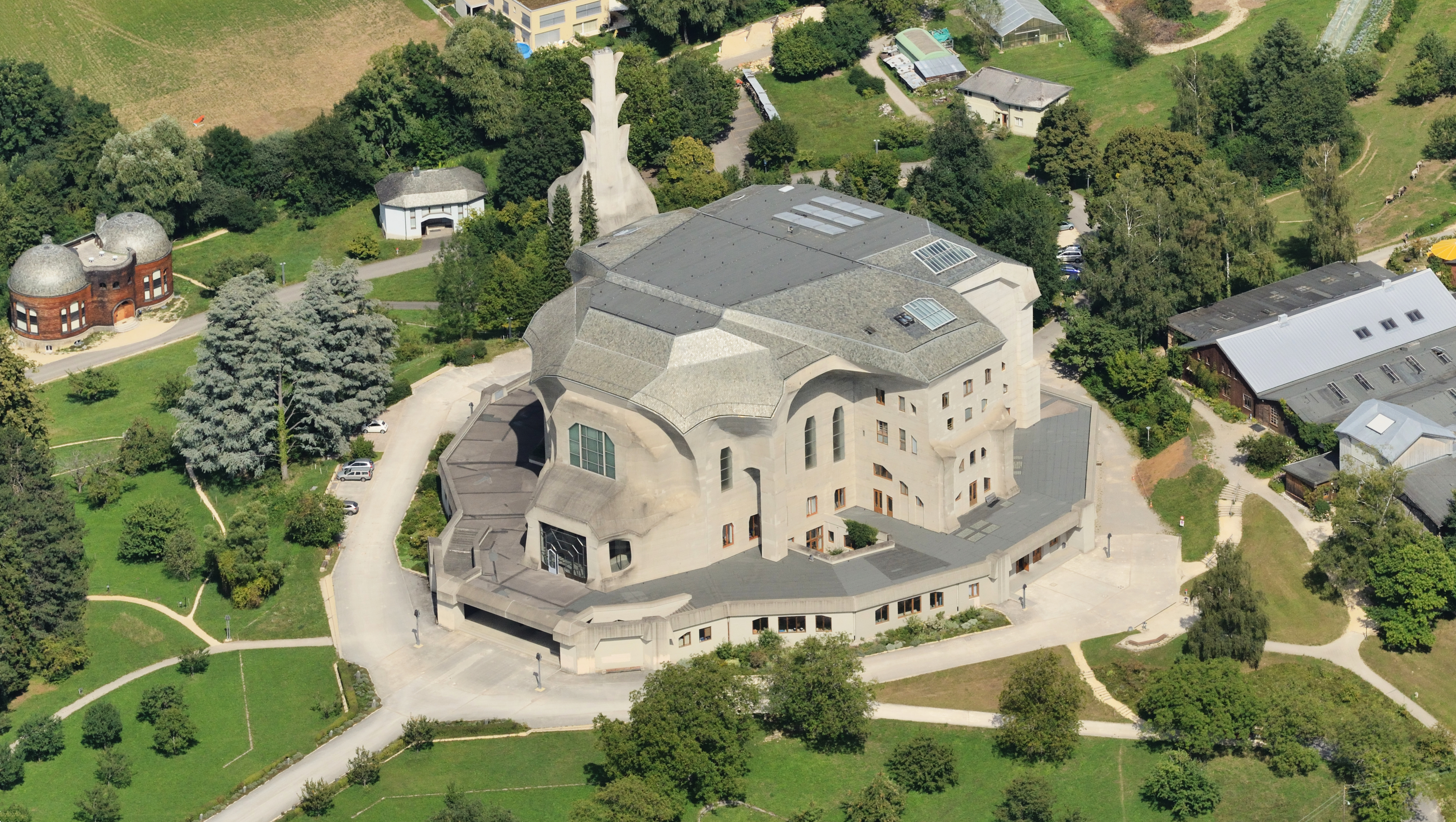
Aerial view of Goetheanum

In the course of 1923, Steiner designed a building to replace the original. This building, now known as the Second Goetheanum, was built wholly of cast concrete. Begun in 1924, the building was not completed until 1928, after the architect's death. It represents a pioneering use of visible concrete in architecture and has been granted protected status as a Swiss national monument. Art critic Michael Brennan has called the building a "true masterpiece of 20th-century expressionist architecture".

The present Goetheanum houses a 1,000-seat auditorium, now the center of an active artistic community incorporating performances of its in-house theater and eurythmy troupes as well as visiting performers from around the world. Full remodelings of the central auditorium took place in the mid-1950s and again in the late 1990s. The stained glass windows in the present building date from Steiner's time; the painted ceiling and sculptural columns are contemporary replications or reinterpretations of those in the First Goetheanum.

In a dedicated gallery, the building also houses a nine-meter-high wooden sculpture, The Representative of Humanity, by Edith Maryon and Rudolf Steiner.

== Architectural principles ==
Steiner's architecture is characterized by a liberation from traditional architectural constraints, especially through the departure from the right-angle as a basis for the building plan. For the first Goetheanum he achieved this in wood by employing boat builders to construct its rounded forms; for the second Goetheanum by using concrete to achieve sculptural shapes on an architectural scale. The use of concrete to achieve organically expressive forms was an innovation for the times; in both buildings, Steiner sought to create forms that were spiritually expressive.

Steiner suggested that he had derived the sculptural forms of the first Goetheanum from spiritual inspirations.

Architects who have visited and praised the Goetheanum's architecture include Henry van de Velde, Frank Lloyd Wright, Hans Scharoun, and Frank Gehry.

Steiner designed approximately 12–13 other built structures, including both institutional structures and residences in and around Dornach.
