= Marie Steiner-von Sivers =

Baltic German actress (1867–1948)

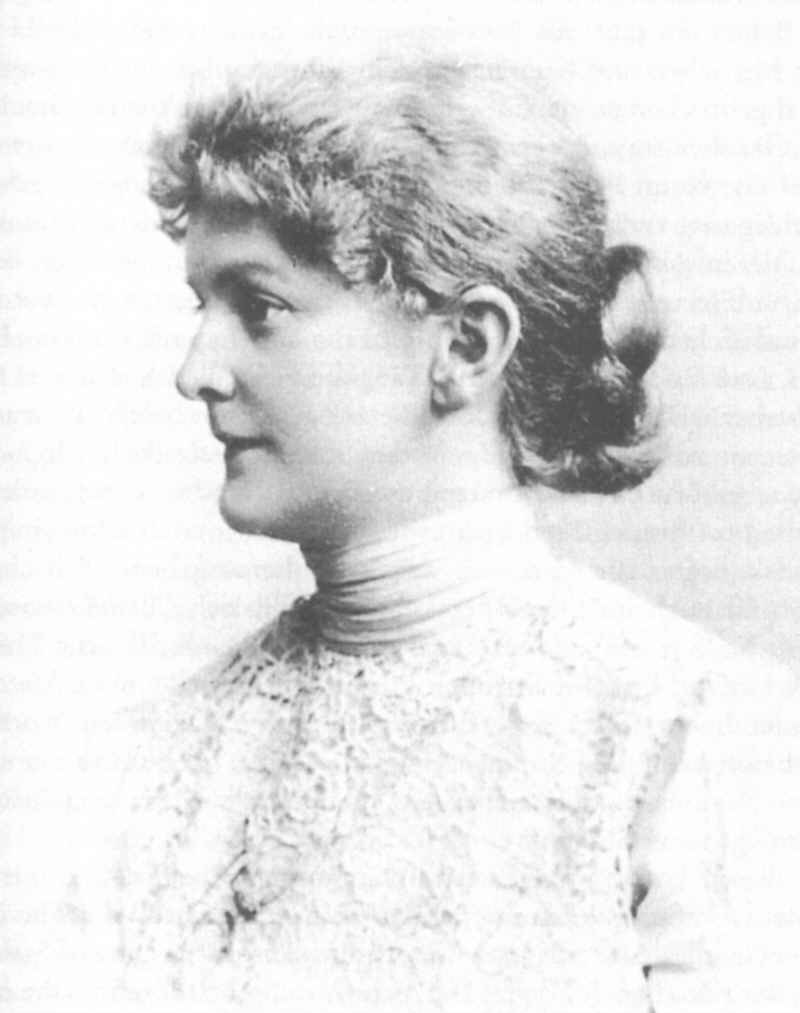
Marie Steiner-von Sivers 1903

Marie Steiner-von Sivers (14 March 1867 – 27 December 1948) was a Baltic German actress, the second wife of Rudolf Steiner and one of his closest colleagues. She made a great contribution to the development of anthroposophy, particularly in her work on the renewal of the performing arts (eurythmy, speech and drama), and the editing and publishing of Rudolf Steiner's literary estate.

== Life and work ==
Marie Steiner-von Sivers was born to an aristocratic family in Włocławek (then part of Imperial Russia's Poland). She was well-educated and was fluent in Russian, German, English, French and Italian. She studied theater and recitation with several teachers in Europe.

=== Relationship to Rudolf Steiner ===
Von Sivers "appeared one day" at one of Rudolf Steiner's early lectures in 1900. In the autumn of 1901, she posed the question to Steiner, "Would it be possible to create a spiritual movement based on European tradition and the impetus of Christ?" Rudolf Steiner later reported:

With this, I was given the opportunity to act in a way that I had only previously imagined. The question had been put to me, and now, according to spiritual laws, I could begin to answer it.

Steiner-von Sivers collaborated with Steiner for the rest of Steiner's life and carried his work beyond his death in 1925 until her own death in 1948. She accompanied him and helped him as secretary, translator, editor, and organizer of his lecture tours and other public activities. She assisted Steiner's work with her own resources and in 1908 founded the Philosophical-Theosophical Press (later Philosophical-Anthroposophical) to publish Steiner's work.

On 24 December 1914, she married Rudolf Steiner. Anna Eunicke Steiner, Steiner's first wife, had died in 1911. In fact, Marie moved into Rudolf's home while he was still married to Anna, which caused Anna to separate from her husband (she divorced him in June 1904). Beginning in 1914, Steiner drew up a succession of wills naming Marie Steiner-von Sivers as heir to his entire work and property and his successor in the leadership of the anthroposophical movement.

=== Eurythmy and speech formation ===
Starting in 1912, Rudolf Steiner developed the art of eurythmy. With Steiner-von Sivers' guidance, it developed in three directions: as a stage art, as an integral part of Waldorf pedagogy, and as a therapeutic method. Under her tutelage, two schools of eurythmy were founded, in Berlin and in Dornach, Switzerland.

Steiner-von Sivers, who had been trained in recitation and elocution, and made a study of purely artistic speaking. She gave introductory poetry recitals at Steiner's lectures and assisted him in the development of the four Mystery Dramas (1910–1913). With her help, Steiner conducted several speech and drama courses with the aim of raising these forms to the level of true art.

=== Politics ===
Marie Steiner had a complex and problematic relationship with National Socialism. She, Guenther Wachsmuth, and Albert Steffen, had publicly expressed sympathy for the Nazi regime since its beginnings; led by such sympathies of their leadership, the Swiss and German Anthroposophical organizations chose for a path conflating accommodation with collaboration, which in the end ensured that while the Nazi regime hunted the esoteric organizations, Gentile Anthroposophists from Nazi Germany and countries occupied by it were let be to a surprising extent. Of course they had some setbacks from the enemies of Anthroposophy among the upper echelons of the Nazi regime, but Anthroposophists also had loyal supporters among them, so overall Gentile Anthroposophists were not badly hit by the Nazi regime. When Rudolf Hess flew to UK, their most powerful protector was gone, but Anthroposophists were still not left without supporters among higher-placed Nazis.

The non-Aryan, the non-German, and the antifascist members of the direction board of the Anthroposophical Society were purged from it; it is unclear if that happened due to Nazi ideology or for other reasons, but the purge clearly brought the Anthroposophic Society closer to Nazism.

Yet when Hitler threatened to suppress the Anthroposophical Society, its executive council—which had recently expelled much of its membership—chose to collaborate rather than resist. Marie Steiner, Günther Wachsmuth, and Albert Steffen knew of Hitler’s violent intentions toward the Jewish people, since Hitler’s attacks on anthroposophy included the accusation that anthroposophy was aligned with the Jews. Rather than standing in solidarity with Hitler’s other targets, they disavowed any sympathy for Judaism and assured Nazi leaders that both they and Steiner were of pure Aryan heritage.^{44}

— McKanan 2017, p. 196

compare the 1944 remarks by Marie Steiner railing against “the financially powerful Jewish circles who control the press”: Marie Steiner, foreword to Rudolf Steiner, Die Weihnachtstagung zur Begründung der Allgemeinen Anthroposophischen Gesellschaft (Dornach: Philosophisch-Anthroposophischer Verlag am Goetheanum, 1944), 7. The passage appears unabridged in the current edition of the book from 1994.

— Staudenmaier 2014, p. 170 fn. 92

== See also ==
- Édouard Schuré

== Biographical resources ==
- Wilfried Hammacher, Marie Steiner: Lebensspuren einer Individualität, Stuttgart: Verlag Freies Geistesleben, 1998 (German); ISBN 3-7725-1798-6.
- Lindenberg, Christophe (2011). Rudolf Steiner – Eine Biographie. 1861-1925 (in German). Verlag Freies Geistesleben. ISBN 978-3-7725-4000-4.
- Hans Peter van Manen, Marie Steiner: Her place in world karma, London: Temple Lodge, 1995; ISBN 0-904693-76-7.
- McKanan, Dan (2017). "Ecology. The Boundaries of Anthroposophy". Eco-Alchemy: Anthroposophy and the History and Future of Environmentalism. University of California Press. ISBN 978-0-520-29006-8.
- Marie Savitch, Marie Steiner-von Sivers: Fellow worker with Rudolf Steiner, London: Rudolf Steiner Press, 1967; ISBN 0-85440-057-5.
- Staudenmaier, Peter (2014). Between Occultism and Nazism: Anthroposophy and the Politics of Race in the Fascist Era. Aries Book Series. Brill. p. 18. ISBN 978-90-04-27015-2. "Though raised Catholic, Büchenbacher had partial Jewish ancestry and was considered a "half-Jew" by Nazi standards. He emigrated to Switzerland in 1936. According to his post-war memoirs, "approximately two-thirds of German anthroposophists more or less succumbed to National Socialism." He reported that various influential anthroposophists were "deeply infected by Nazi views" and "staunchly supported Hitler." Both Guenther Wachsmuth, Secretary of the Swiss-based General Anthroposophical Society, and Marie Steiner, the widow of Rudolf Steiner, were described as "completely pro-Nazi." Büchenbacher retrospectively lamented the far-reaching "Nazi sins" of his colleagues.^{59}"
- Zander, Helmut (2007). Anthroposophie in Deutschland: Theosophische Weltanschauung und gesellschaftliche Praxis 1884–1945 (in German). Göttingen: Vandenhoeck & Ruprecht. ISBN 978-3-525-55452-4.
- Zander, Helmut (2011). Rudolf Steiner: Die Biografie (in German). München Zürich: Piper. ISBN 978-3-492-05448-5. OCLC 698166064.
