= Dornach =

- Municipality
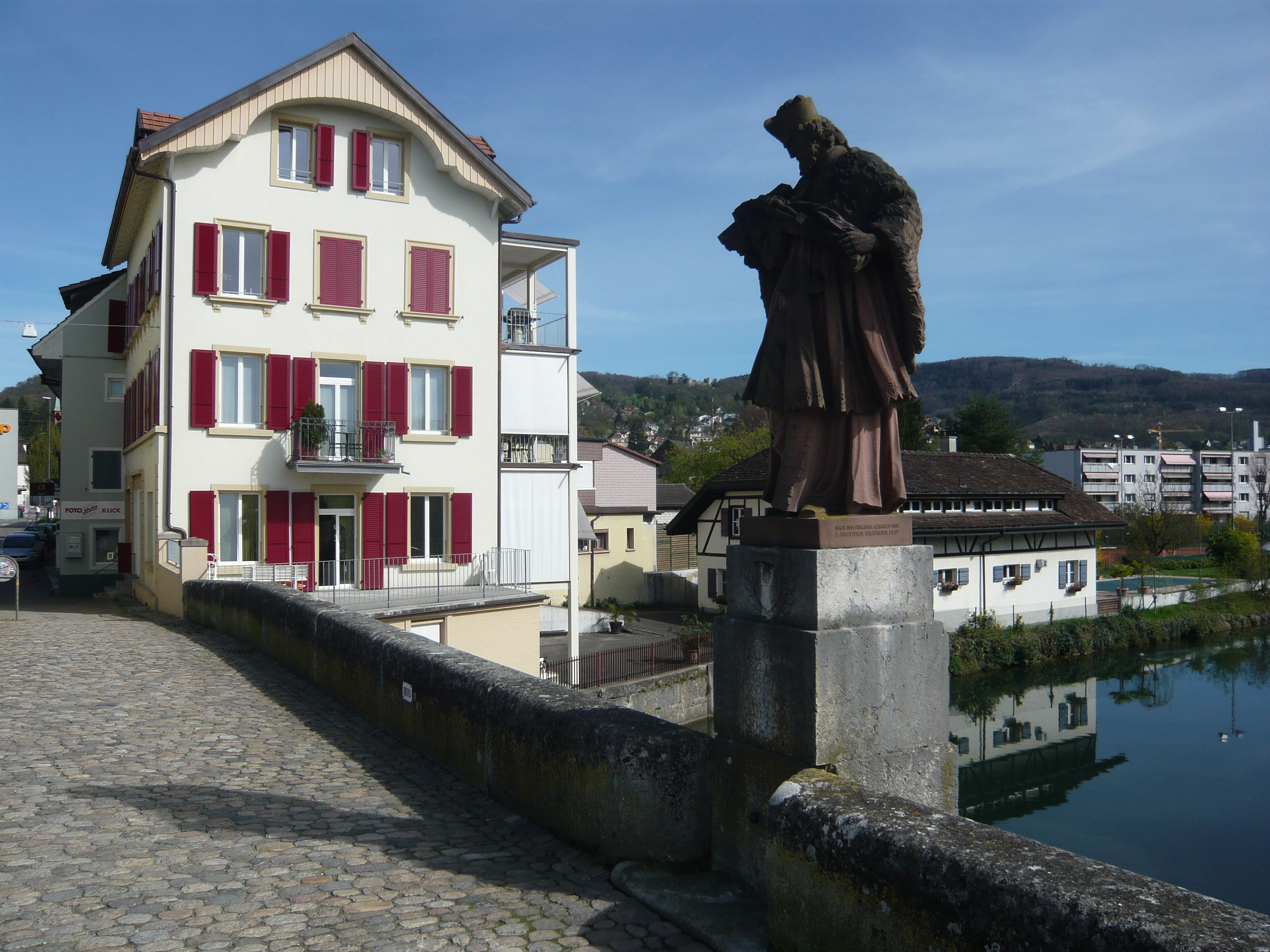

- Coat of arms
- Location of Dornach
- Location within Switzerland Location within Canton of Solothurn
- Coordinates: 47°29′N 7°37′E
- Country: Switzerland
- Canton: Solothurn
- District: Dorneck

Area
  - Total: 5.77 km^{2} (2.23 sq mi)
- Elevation: 338 m (1,109 ft)

Population (December 2020)
  - Total: 6,882
  - Density: 1,190/km^{2} (3,090/sq mi)
- Time zone: UTC+01:00 (CET)
  - Summer (DST): UTC+02:00 (CEST)
- Postal code: 4143
- SFOS number: 2473
- ISO 3166 code: CH-SO
- Surrounded by: Aesch (BL), Arlesheim (BL), Duggingen (BL), Gempen, Hochwald, Reinach (BL)
- Website: www.dornach.ch

Dornach (Swiss German: Dornech) is a municipality in the district of Dorneck in the canton of Solothurn in Switzerland.

== History ==
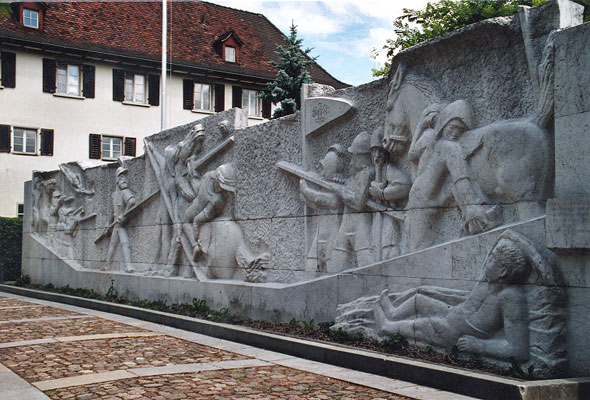
Memorial to the Battle of Dornach

Dornach is first mentioned in 1223 as de Tornacho. In 1307 it was mentioned as zu Dornach. It has been settled since at least 1223 when a local lay priest was known as Johannes de Tornacho (thought to mean "from the estate of Turnus").

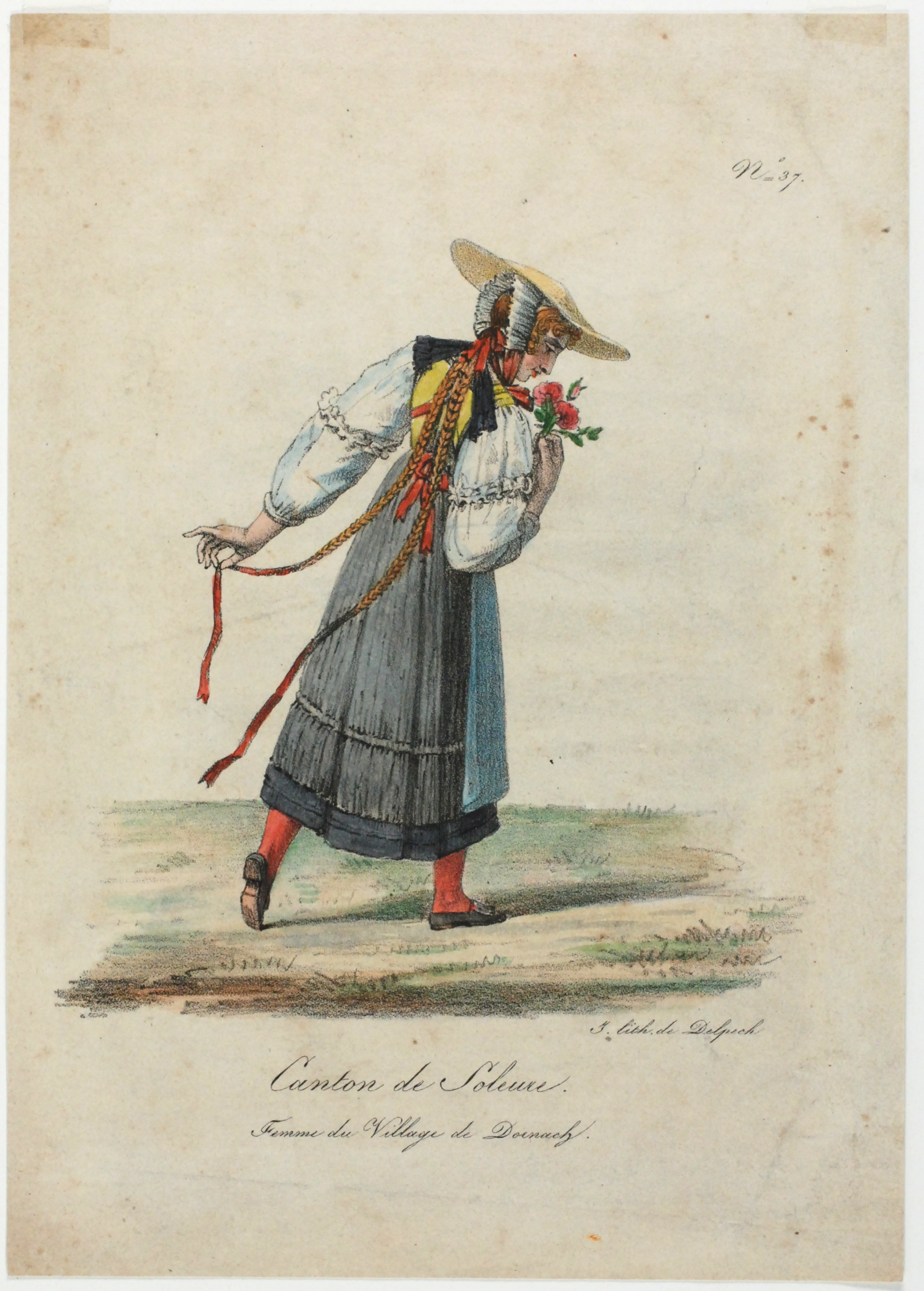
Woman from Dornach wearing a traditional costume.

The site was the location of the decisive 1499 Battle of Dornach, which ended the Swabian War and effectively ensured the independence of the Old Swiss Confederacy from the Holy Roman Empire. The battle is memorialized in a 1949 relief wall.

Today Dornach is famous for the Goetheanum and is home to the international headquarters of the Anthroposophical movement founded by Rudolf Steiner.

== Geography ==
Dornach has an area, as of 2009, of 5.77 square kilometers (2.23 sq mi). Of this area, 1 km^{2} (0.39 sq mi) or 17.3% is used for agricultural purposes, while 2.67 km^{2} (1.03 sq mi) or 46.3% is forested. Of the rest of the land, 2.05 km^{2} (0.79 sq mi) or 35.5% is settled (buildings or roads), 0.02 km^{2} (4.9 acres) or 0.3% is either rivers or lakes and 0.01 km^{2} (2.5 acres) or 0.2% is unproductive land.

Of the built-up area, industrial buildings made up 3.6% of the total area while housing and buildings made up 22.4% and transportation infrastructure made up 6.8%. while parks, green belts and sports fields made up 2.3%. Out of the forested land, 44.2% of the total land area is heavily forested and 2.1% is covered with orchards or small clusters of trees. Of the agricultural land, 6.1% is used for growing crops and 8.0% is pastures, while 3.3% is used for orchards or vine crops. All the water in the municipality is flowing water.

The municipality is in the Dorneck district. It consists of the village of Dornach which is made up of two villages, Dornachdorf (also known as Oberdornach) and Dornachbrugg. Until the last quarter of the 19th century the two villages were completely separate.

== Coat of arms ==
The blazon of the municipal coat of arms is Argent two Fish-hooks inverted and addorsed Sable.

== Demographics ==
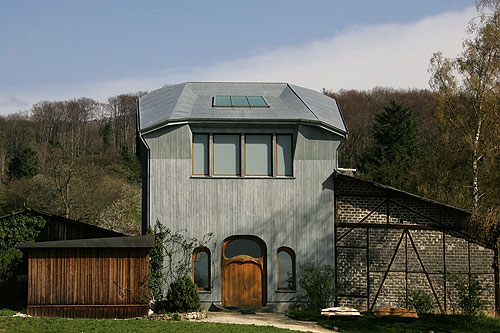
A building near the Goetheanum

Dornach has a population (as of December 2020) of 6,882. As of 2008, 23.8% of the population are resident foreign nationals. Over the last 10 years (1999–2009 ) the population has changed at a rate of 4.2%.

Most of the population (as of 2000) speaks German (5,212 or 88.5%), with Italian being second most common (137 or 2.3%) and French being third (91 or 1.5%). There are six people who speak Romansh.

As of 2008, the gender distribution of the population was 47.7% male and 52.3% female. The population was made up of 2,221 Swiss men (35.4% of the population) and 771 (12.3%) non-Swiss men. There were 2,463 Swiss women (39.3%) and 819 (13.1%) non-Swiss women. Of the population in the municipality 1,343 or about 22.8% were born in Dornach and lived there in 2000. There were 304, or 5.2%, who were born in the same canton, while 2,464 or 41.9% were born somewhere else in Switzerland, and 1,544 or 26.2% were born outside of Switzerland.

In 2008 there were 41 live births to Swiss citizens and 15 births to non-Swiss citizens, and in same time span there were 36 deaths of Swiss citizens and five non-Swiss citizen deaths. Ignoring immigration and emigration, the population of Swiss citizens increased by five while the foreign population increased by 10. There were four Swiss men who immigrated back to Switzerland and 12 Swiss women who emigrated from Switzerland. At the same time, there were 51 non-Swiss men and 25 non-Swiss women who immigrated from another country to Switzerland. The total Swiss population change in 2008 (from all sources, including moves across municipal borders) was a decrease of 33 and the non-Swiss population increased by 50 people. This represents a population growth rate of 0.3%.

The age distribution, as of 2000, in Dornach is; 413 children or 7.0% of the population are between 0 and 6 years old and 837 teenagers or 14.2% are between 7 and 19. Of the adult population, 240 people or 4.1% of the population are between 20 and 24 years old. 1,795 people or 30.5% are between 25 and 44, and 1,604 people or 27.3% are between 45 and 64. The senior population distribution is 722 people or 12.3% of the population are between 65 and 79 years old and there are 275 people or 4.7% who are over 80.

As of 2000, there were 2,427 people who were single and never married in the municipality. There were 2,719 married individuals, 359 widows or widowers and 381 individuals who are divorced.

As of 2000, there were 2,619 private households in the municipality, and an average of 2.1 persons per household. There were 998 households that consist of only one person and 151 households with five or more people. Out of a total of 2,710 households that answered this question, 36.8% were households made up of just one person and there were 18 adults who lived with their parents. Of the rest of the households, there are 745 married couples without children, 659 married couples with children There were 146 single parents with a child or children. There were 53 households that were made up of unrelated people and 91 households that were made up of some sort of institution or another collective housing.

In 2000 there were 922 single-family homes (or 65.0% of the total) out of a total of 1,418 inhabited buildings. There were 310 multi-family buildings (21.9%), along with 118 multi-purpose buildings that were mostly used for housing (8.3%) and 68 other use buildings (commercial or industrial) that also had some housing (4.8%). Of the single-family homes, 65 were built before 1919, while 121 were built between 1990 and 2000. The greatest number of single-family homes (218) were built between 1971 and 1980.

In 2000 there were 2,836 apartments in the municipality. The most common apartment size was the rooms, of which there were 738. There were 171 single-room apartments and 856 apartments with five or more rooms. Of these apartments, a total of 2,536 apartments (89.4% of the total) were permanently occupied, while 191 apartments (6.7%) were seasonally occupied and 109 apartments (3.8%) were empty. As of 2009, the construction rate of new housing units was 2 new units per 1000 residents. The vacancy rate for the municipality, in 2010, was 1.72%.

The historical population is given in the following chart:

== Heritage sites of national significance ==
The Goetheanum with surrounding buildings, the De Jaager House, the Duldeck House and the ruins of Dorneck Castle are listed as Swiss heritage sites of national significance. The entire Goetheanum site is part of the Inventory of Swiss Heritage Sites.

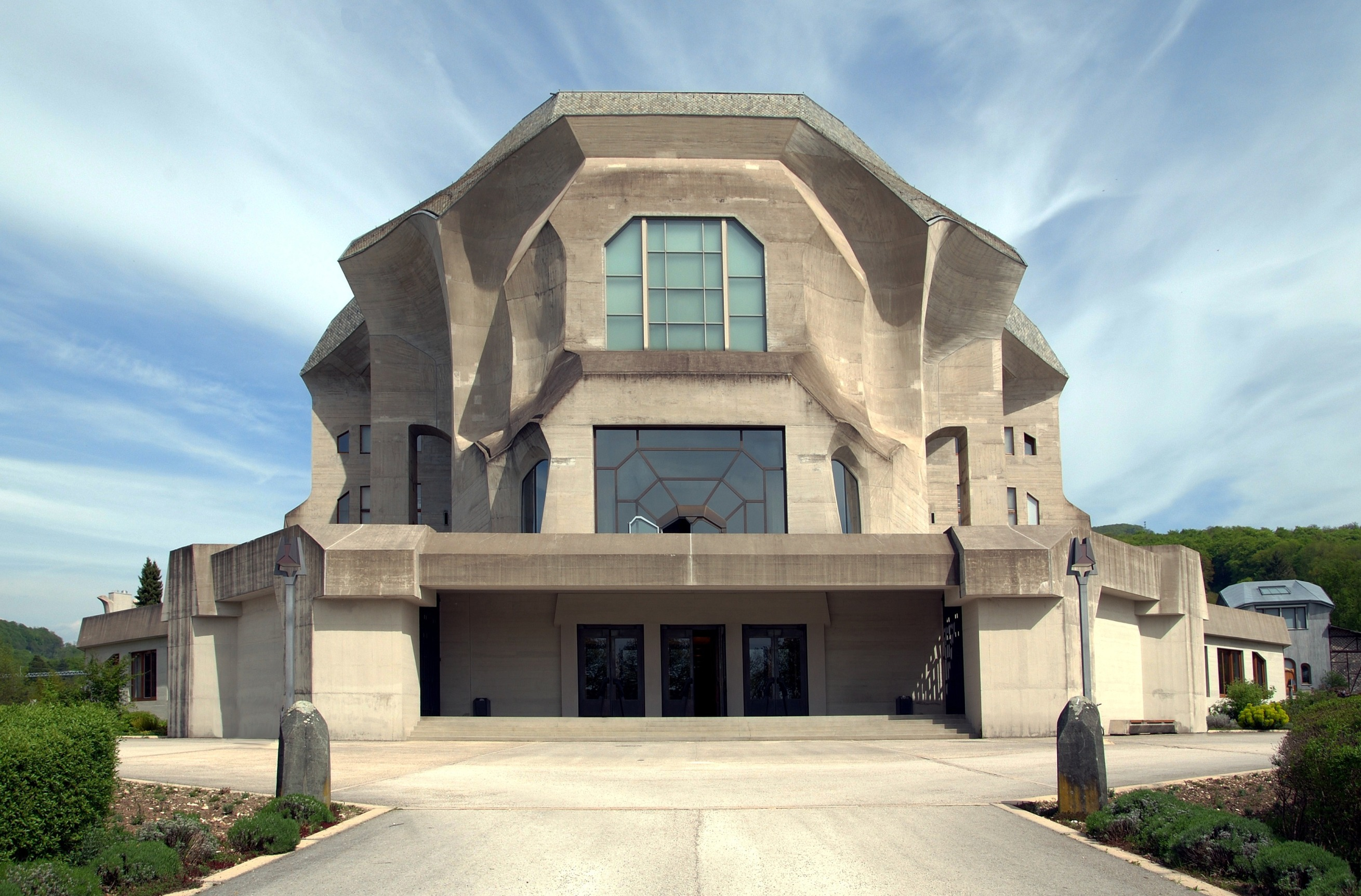
Goetheanum

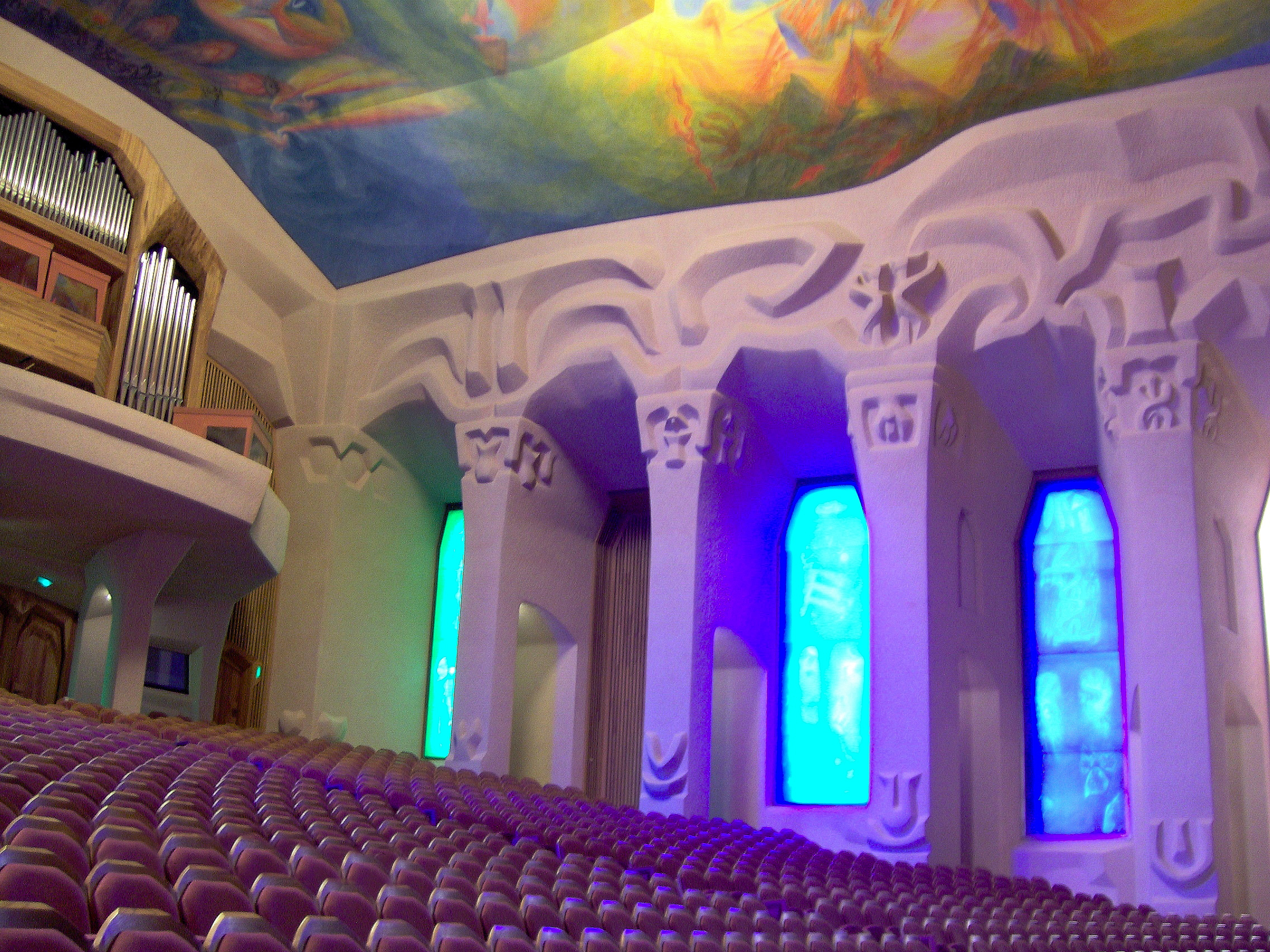
Goetheanum main hall

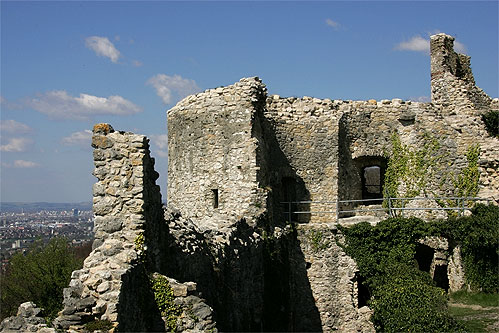
Ruins of Dorneck Castle

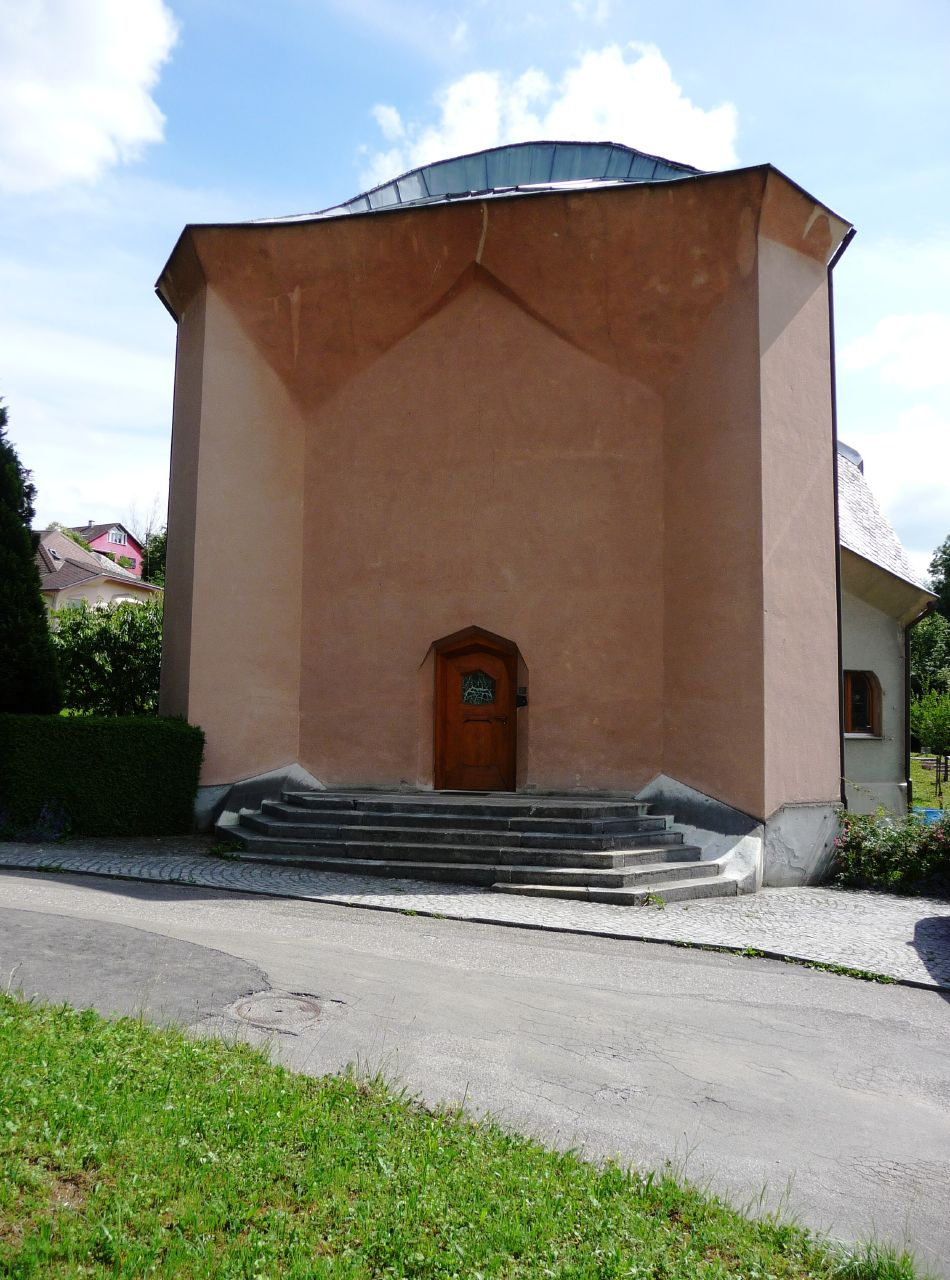
De Jaager house

== Politics ==
In the 2007 federal election the most popular party was the SP which received 28.33% of the vote. The next three most popular parties were the Green Party (22.52%), the SVP (18.97%) and the FDP (14.93%). In the federal election, a total of 2,051 votes were cast, and the voter turnout was 53.7%.

== Economy ==
As of 2010, Dornach had an unemployment rate of 3.1%. As of 2008, there were 24 people employed in the primary economic sector and about 7 businesses involved in this sector. A total of 605 people were employed in the secondary sector, and there were 51 businesses in this sector. 1,578 people were employed in the tertiary sector, with 190 businesses in this sector. There were 2,946 residents of the municipality who were employed in some capacity, of which females made up 46.3% of the workforce.

In 2008 the total number of full-time equivalent jobs was 1,822. The number of jobs in the primary sector was 17, of which 13 were in agriculture and four were in forestry or lumber production. The number of jobs in the secondary sector was 586, of which 504 or (86.0%) were in manufacturing and 80 (13.7%) were in construction. The number of jobs in the tertiary sector was 1,219. In the tertiary sector; 264 or 21.7% were in wholesale or retail sales or the repair of motor vehicles, 25 or 2.1% were in the movement and storage of goods, 102 or 8.4% were in a hotel or restaurant, 43 or 3.5% were in the information industry, 32 or 2.6% were the insurance or financial industry, 66 or 5.4% were technical professionals or scientists, 45 or 3.7% were in education and 368 or 30.2% were in health care.

In 2000, there were 1,992 workers who commuted into the municipality and 2,045 workers who commuted away. The municipality is a net exporter of workers, with about 1.0 workers leaving the municipality for every one entering. About 21.4% of the workforce coming into Dornach are coming from outside Switzerland, while 0.2% of the locals commute out of Switzerland for work. Of the working population, 26.8% used public transportation to get to work, and 43.9% used a private car.

== Religion ==
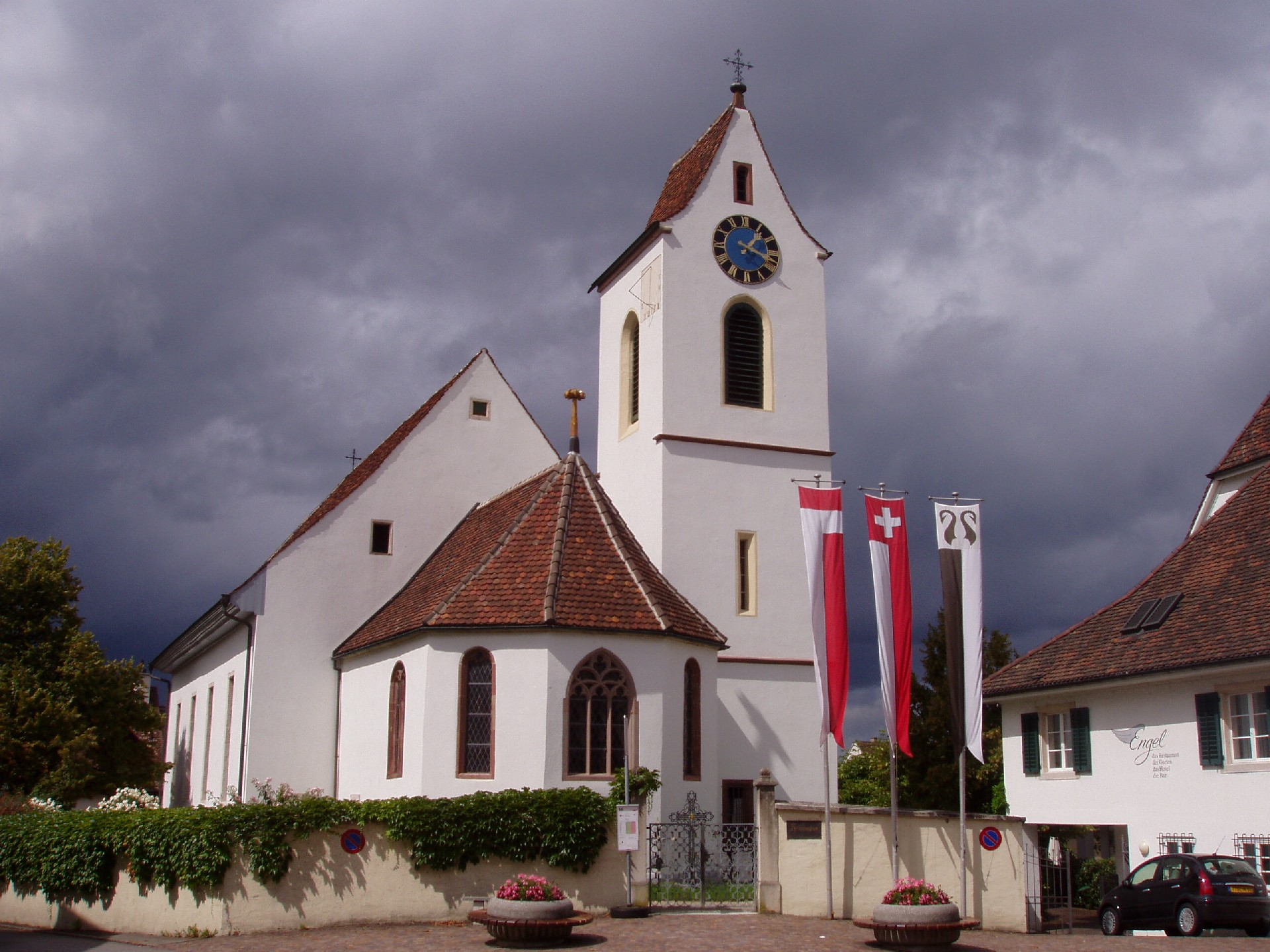
Church in Dornach

From the 2000 census, 2,039 or 34.6% were Roman Catholic, while 1,319 or 22.4% belonged to the Swiss Reformed Church. Of the rest of the population, there were 53 members of an Orthodox church (or about 0.90% of the population), there were 27 individuals (or about 0.46% of the population) who belonged to the Christian Catholic Church, and there were 375 individuals (or about 6.37% of the population) who belonged to another Christian church. There were 160 (or about 2.72% of the population) who were Islamic. There were 11 individuals who were Buddhist, 32 individuals who were Hindu and six who belonged to another church. A total of 1,551 (or about 26.35% of the population) belonged to no church, are agnostic or atheist, and 313 individuals (or about 5.32% of the population) did not answer the question.

== Transport ==
Dornach sits on the Basel–Biel/Bienne line and is served by local trains at Dornach-Arlesheim. It is also served by Line 10 of the Basel tramway network.

== Education ==
In Dornach about 2,181 or (37.1%) of the population have completed non-mandatory upper secondary education, and 1,223 or (20.8%) have completed additional higher education (either university or a Fachhochschule). Of the 1,223 who completed tertiary schooling, 45.2% were Swiss men, 23.5% were Swiss women, 14.1% were non-Swiss men and 17.1% were non-Swiss women.

During the 2010-2011 school year there were a total of 444 students in the Dornach school system. The education system in the Canton of Solothurn allows young children to attend two years of non-obligatory Kindergarten. During that school year, there were 83 children in kindergarten. The canton's school system requires students to attend six years of primary school, with some of the children attending smaller, specialized classes. In the municipality there were 288 students in primary school and 5 students in the special, smaller classes. The secondary school program consists of three lower, obligatory years of schooling, followed by three to five years of optional, advanced schools. A total of 68 lower secondary students attend school in Dornach.

As of 2000, there were 40 students in Dornach who came from another municipality, while 457 residents attended schools outside the municipality.

== Sport ==
SC Dornach is the municipality's football club.
