= Hugh Quigley =

Scottish economist and statistician (1895–1979)

- Hugh Quigley by Howard Coster. National Portrait Gallery, London.
- Born: 6 August 1895; Stirling, Scotland
- Died: 30 January 1979 (aged 83)
- Education: Lanark Grammar School
- Alma mater: University of Glasgow
- Occupations: Economist, statistician, farmer, author
- Known for: Passchendaele and the Somme: A diary of 1917 (1928); Housing and Slum Clearance in London (1934)

Hugh Quigley (6 August 1895 – 30 January 1979) was a Scottish economist, statistician, farmer, and author. His diary of his service with the 12th Royal Scots Regiment of the British Army at Passchendaele and the Somme during the First World War was published in 1928.

A scholar of Italian literature and Carnegie research fellow at the University of Glasgow, he later entered the electricity industry where he became a senior economist and statistician and advocated the greater use of Scottish hydro-electric power distributed through the newly constructed National Grid. He wrote on German history, the electricity industry, the advantages of central planning in housing and industry, and on topographical subjects, such as the two books he produced on his native Scotland.

He was closely associated with the British Labour Party and a member of the influential XYZ Club that fed financial intelligence to the party in the 1930s.

== Early life and family ==
Hugh Quigley was born in Stirling, Scotland, on 6 August 1895, the eldest son of James and Catherine Quigley. He was educated at Lanark Grammar School and then the University of Glasgow. He also studied in Naples and Munich. He served in the 12th Royal Scots Regiment of the British Army during the First World War and was at Passchendaele and the Somme where he was injured. His "unvarnished" diary of his service was published "without modification" by Methuen in 1928. He received his MA from the University of Glasgow in 1919 and was a Carnegie research fellow in modern languages from 1919 to 1921.

He married Marion Sommerville (died 1974) and they had two sons and one daughter. Tragically losing Hugh at the age of 5, the middle of the three children and buried in Esher close to the Claremont Estate where the family lived.

== Career ==
Quigley worked as an economist in the research department of the Metropolitan-Vickers Electrical Company from 1922 to 1924 and was head of the economic and statistical department of the British Electrotechnical and Allied Manufacturers' Association from 1924 to 1930. He was chief statistical officer of the Central Electricity Board from 1931 to 1943, and later, chief economist of the Central Electricity Authority.

He was involved in the production of Paul Rotha's documentary film The Face of Britain (1935) which was sponsored (uncredited) by the Central Electricity Board. He saw the potential for power from Scottish hydro-electrical sources, distributed by the newly built National Grid (1928–33), to play a major role in the reorganisation of British industry that was also one of the themes of Rotha's film.

== Politics ==
Quigley was associated with the Labour Party and an advocate generally of central planning and government intervention, arguing in respect of housing for instance that the planned city was a "necessity of the modern world; it takes the place of an economic scheme based on laissez-faire, which has been unequal to the task of maintaining the population, absorbing its natural increase and creating a higher standard of living". He was a member of the XYZ Club, formed in 1932, which met in secret at first and existed to provide financial intelligence to the Labour Party. It drew up plans for the nationalisation of the Bank of England, and these were put into practice in 1946 when the Attlee ministry, a Labour government, came to power immediately after the End of World War II in Europe.

== Writing ==
In 1927 he published Towards Industrial Recovery, a survey of post-First World War industrial conditions and organisation in Britain, France and Germany. Barbara Wootton, in reviewing the work, summarised Quigley's recommendations for more competitive industry as "closer horizontal combination by the formation of trusts or central selling and purchasing agencies, closer association of finance and industry and the establishment of a council like the German Reichswirtschaftsrat."

In the 1920s and 1930s, he was a regular reviewer of books about Germany and Italy for the Journal of the Royal Institute of International Affairs.

In 1934 he wrote, with Ismay Goldie, on Housing and Slum Clearance in London, comparing the developments of the London County Council at Kennington and Stamford Hill, the Duchy of Cornwall's building at Kennington, the development at Somers Town by the St Pancras House Improvement Society, and others favourably with the new schemes built in Austria, Germany and the Netherlands. The authors concluded that piecemeal slum clearance by private developers was insufficient and that more comprehensive development should begin while "cheap money, cheap material, and idle labour are procurable."

His topographical works included a study of Lombardy, the Tyrol and the Trentino (1925), a book about the Rhône (1927), and two on his native Scotland: an anthology of Lanarkshire (1929) and a volume on the Scottish Highlands in Batsford's The Face of Britain series (1936). In that book, despite mainly covering the natural environment, Quigley returned regularly to the contribution that electrification could make to national prosperity, advocating, for instance, the electrification of Highland railways using hydro-electric power. A long standing member of the Savage Club in London named after the poet Richard Savage and founded in 1857 . Members drawn from the fields of Art, drama, law, literature, music and science.

== Later life ==
In his later years, Quigley lived and farmed at Melchet Park Farm, near Sherfield English, north of Southampton. In 1947 he published New Forest Orchard, a description of the creation of an orchard at Melchet Park. In 1971 he published Melchet. He died on 30 January 1979.

== Selected publications ==
=== Literature ===
- Italy and the Rise of a New School of Criticism in the 18th Century (With special reference to the work of Pietro Calepio). Munro & Scott, Perth, 1921.

=== Economics/history/politics ===
- Electrical Power and National Progress, etc. George Allen & Unwin, London, 1925.
- Combines and Trusts in the Electrical Industry. British Electrotechnical and Allied Manufacturers' Association, London, 1927.
- Towards Industrial Recovery. Methuen, London, 1927.
- Republican Germany. A political and economic study &c. Methuen, London, 1928. Reprinted 1968. (With R. T. Clark)
- The Electrical Industry of Great Britain. British Electrotechnical and Allied Manufacturers' Association, London, 1929.
- Power Resources of the World (Potential and Developed). World Power Conference, London, 1929.
- "German History from 1900 to 1931" in Bithell, Jethro. (Ed.) (1932) Germany. A companion to German studies. Methuen, London, 1932.
- Housing and Slum Clearance in London. Methuen, London, 1934. (With Ismay Goldie)
- A Plan for the Highlands. Proposals for a Highland Development Board, etc. Methuen, London, 1936.
- End Monopoly Exploitation. A policy for industry. Kegan Paul & Co., London, 1941.

=== Diary ===
- Passchendaele and the Somme: A diary of 1917. Methuen, London, 1928. Revised edition 1965.

=== Topographical ===
- Lombardy Tyrol and the Trentino. Methuen, London, 1925.
- The Land of the Rhone: Lyons and Provence. Methuen, London, 1927.
- Lanarkshire in Prose and Verse: An Anthology. E. Mathews & Marrot, London, 1929.
- The Highlands of Scotland. The Face of Britain series. B. T. Batsford, London, 1936. Photographs by Robert M. Adam.
- New Forest Orchard. Methuen, London, 1947.
- A Small Community. 1970.
- Melchet. Melchet Park, Romsey, 1971.

== See also ==
- Daniel Nicol Dunlop
