= The Face of Britain =

The Face of Britain may refer to:

- The Face of Britain (book series), 1930s–1950s topographical book series
- The Face of Britain (film), 1935 short documentary by Paul Rotha
- Simon Schama's works:
  - The Face of Britain: The Nation Through Its Portraits (2015 book)
  - The Face of Britain by Simon Schama (2015 TV series)
