= Walter Johannes Stein =

Austrian philosopher and teacher

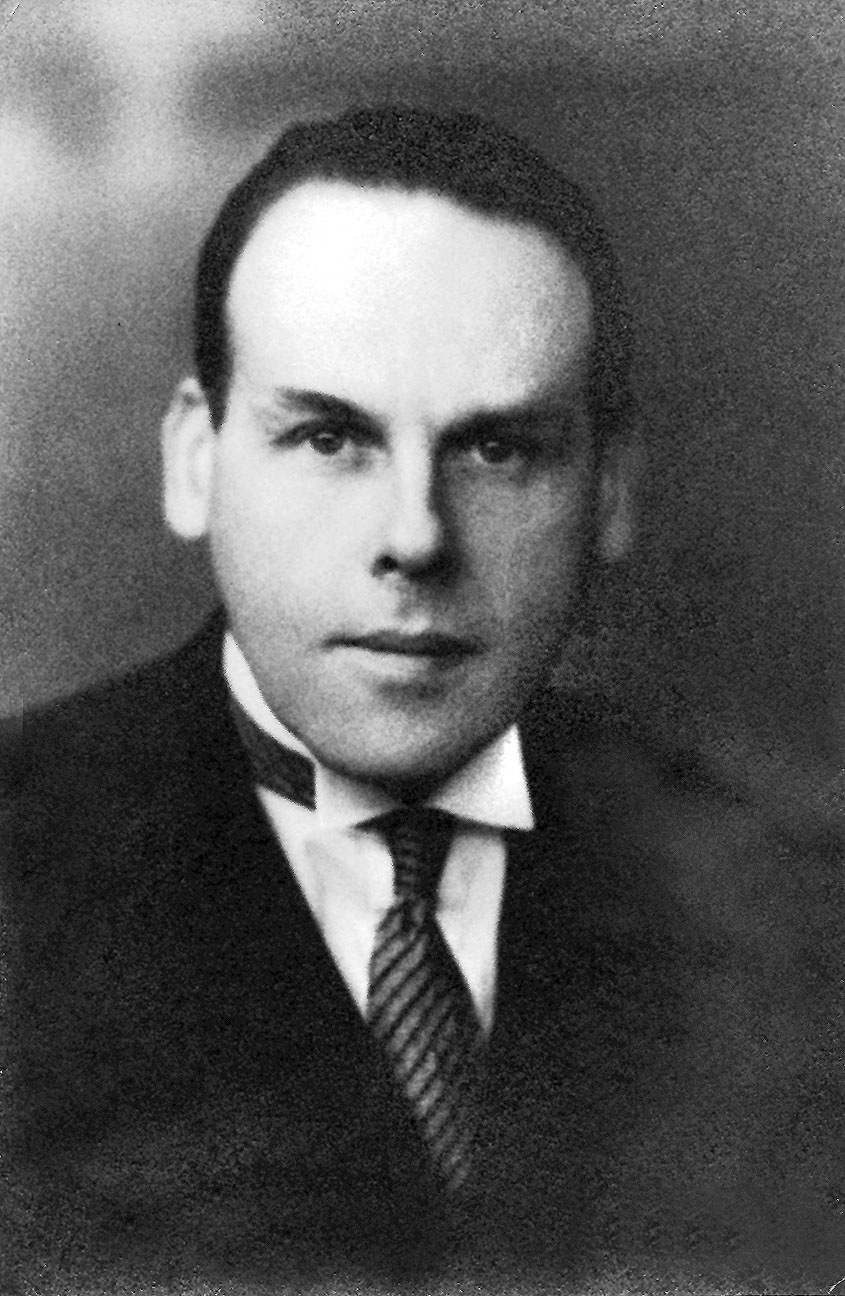
Walter Johannes Stein, circa 1930

Walter Johannes Stein (6 February 1891, in Vienna – 7 July 1957, in London) was an Austrian philosopher, Waldorf school teacher, Grail researcher, and one of the pioneers of anthroposophy.

== Biography ==
Of Jewish descent, Stein studied mathematics, physics, and philosophy at Vienna University, before completing a doctorate in philosophy at the end of the First World War, having continued work on it throughout his service in an artillery unit in the war. He became a personal student of Rudolf Steiner from about the age of 21, and enjoyed the unofficial supervision of Steiner while writing his dissertation. Broadly speaking, the dissertation was an attempt to write a theory of cognition for spiritual knowledge.

After the First World War, Stein assisted Steiner in promoting Social Threefolding. When it became apparent in 1919 that these efforts were not going to succeed, Steiner asked Stein to teach history and German literature at the first Waldorf School in Stuttgart. It was as part of this work that Stein began his research on the Grail, which culminated in 1928 with his book The Ninth Century and the Holy Grail. In this work, he attempted to identify historical people and events represented in the Grail epic and to interpret Parzival as an esoteric document representing the human path of inner development. Stein also wrote various articles on these themes.

Stein lectured extensively on anthroposophy and related themes from the early 1920s onward, giving up to 300 lectures a year. He also contributed many articles to The Present Age and similar periodicals, and wrote a number of short books including The Principle of Reincarnation, Gold: in History and in Modern Times, West-East: A Study in National Relationships, Labour: in History and in Modern Times, and The British: Their Psychology and Destiny. Stein claimed to have had a spiritual breakthrough in 1924 using the meditative methods of Steiner and to have attained some insight into his own karmic background.

Stein moved to London in 1933, at the invitation of the theosophist-turned-anthroposophist Daniel Nicol Dunlop. Dunlop was director of the British Electrical and Allied Manufacturers' Association (BEAMA), and chairman of the executive council of the World Power Conference. Dunlop had called Stein to London to take up a post in research for the World Power Conference; he had apparently founded the World Power Conference as a precursor to a World Economic Conference, and he had called Stein to London to assist him especially with this latter, more ambitious, project. Dunlop died in 1935 before this plan could be brought to fruition, but Stein did bring about Dunlop's wish for an independent cultural journal in the form of The Present Age. Stein, having taken up various studies in economics, geography, and geology for his collaborative work with Dunlop, was able to bring together the results of this work in a special issue of the journal under the title The Earth as a Basis of World Economy. The publication of the journal ceased with the start of the Second World War.

== See also ==
- List of Austrian writers
