= BEAMA =

BEAMA logo

BEAMA, formerly the British Electrotechnical and Allied Manufacturers' Association, is a trade association for energy infrastructure companies in the United Kingdom.

== History ==
The organisation was established in 1902 as the National Electrical Manufacturers' Association before changing its name to the British Electrotechnical and Allied Manufacturers' Association in 1911.

The first director was Daniel Nicol Dunlop, also chairman of the first World Power Conference (now the World Energy Council) in 1924.

A collection of the organisation's records for the period 1905 to 1986 is held in the Modern Records Centre of the University of Warwick covering the subjects of trolley buses, electric welding, electric railroads, the electric industries, and the training of electrical engineers.

== Activities ==
BEAMA lobbies on behalf of energy infrastructure companies in the United Kingdom.

== Selected publications ==
- "Combines and Trusts in the Electrical Industry". The Spectator. 27 August 1927.
- The Electrical Industry of Great Britain (1929)
- "The British Electrical and Allied Manufacturers' Association ('Beama')". Nature. 132 (3322): 23. 1 July 1933. Bibcode:1933Natur.132Q..23.. doi:10.1038/132023a0.

== See also ==
- Hugh Quigley
