= Robert M. Adam =

Scottish photographer and botanist

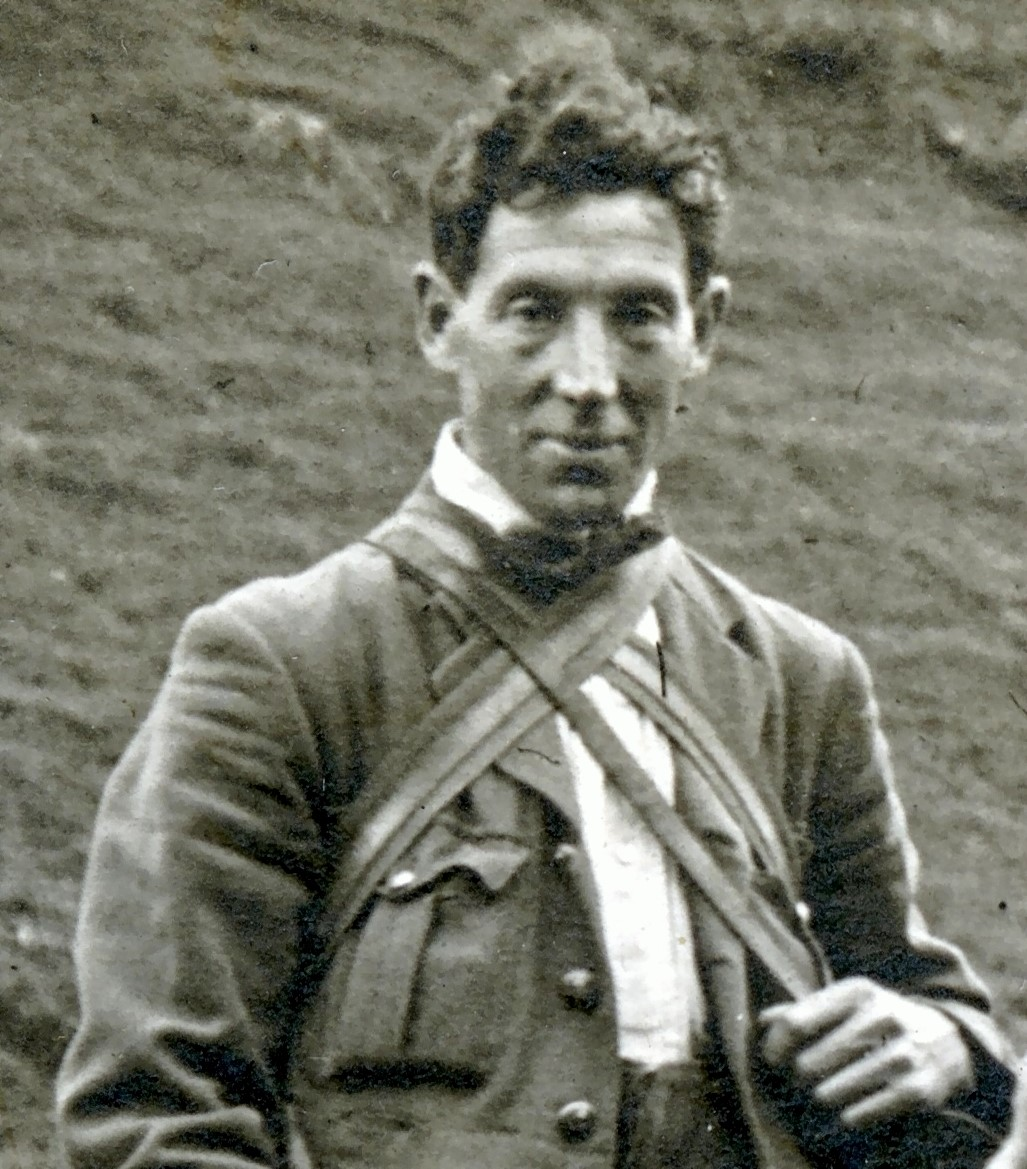
- Robert Moyes Adam, c. 1929
- Born: 1 January 1885; Carluke, Scotland
- Died: 13 November 1967 (aged 82); Edinburgh, Scotland
- Education: Heriot-Watt College & Edinburgh College of Art
- Occupations: Photographer, botanist

Robert Moyes Adam (1 January 1885 – 13 November 1967) was a Scottish photographer and botanist known for his work with the Royal Botanic Garden Edinburgh.

He acquired his first camera, a quarter plate model, when he was fourteen and upgraded to a half plate model in 1908 that was made for him and that he used for the rest of his life. He started work at the Royal Botanic Garden Edinburgh in 1903 prepared illustrations for lectures by Isaac Bayley Balfour, becoming a permanent employee in 1914 and working there until his retirement.

He was the official artist to the Botanical Society of Edinburgh and provided photographic illustrations for books, articles and calendars. He developed all his photographs himself, amassing a large collection of plates and prints that he sold to D. C. Thomson who subsequently donated it to the University of St Andrews in 1987.

== Early life and family ==
Robert Adam was born on 1 January 1885 at the Evangelical Union manse in Carluke, Lanarkshire, Scotland, to the reverend John Adam (1841 – c. 1916) of the Evangelical Union church, and his wife Isabella Adam (née Moyes).

His childhood was spent in Edinburgh where his father was a minister at the Kirk Memorial, Abbeymount. He acquired his first camera, a quarter plate model, when he was fourteen and acquired a half plate camera in 1908 that was made to his specification. He began to keep records of his photographs in 1901. He studied science at Heriot-Watt College and drawing at the Edinburgh College of Art.

He married Anne Stewart and they had two children.

== Career ==
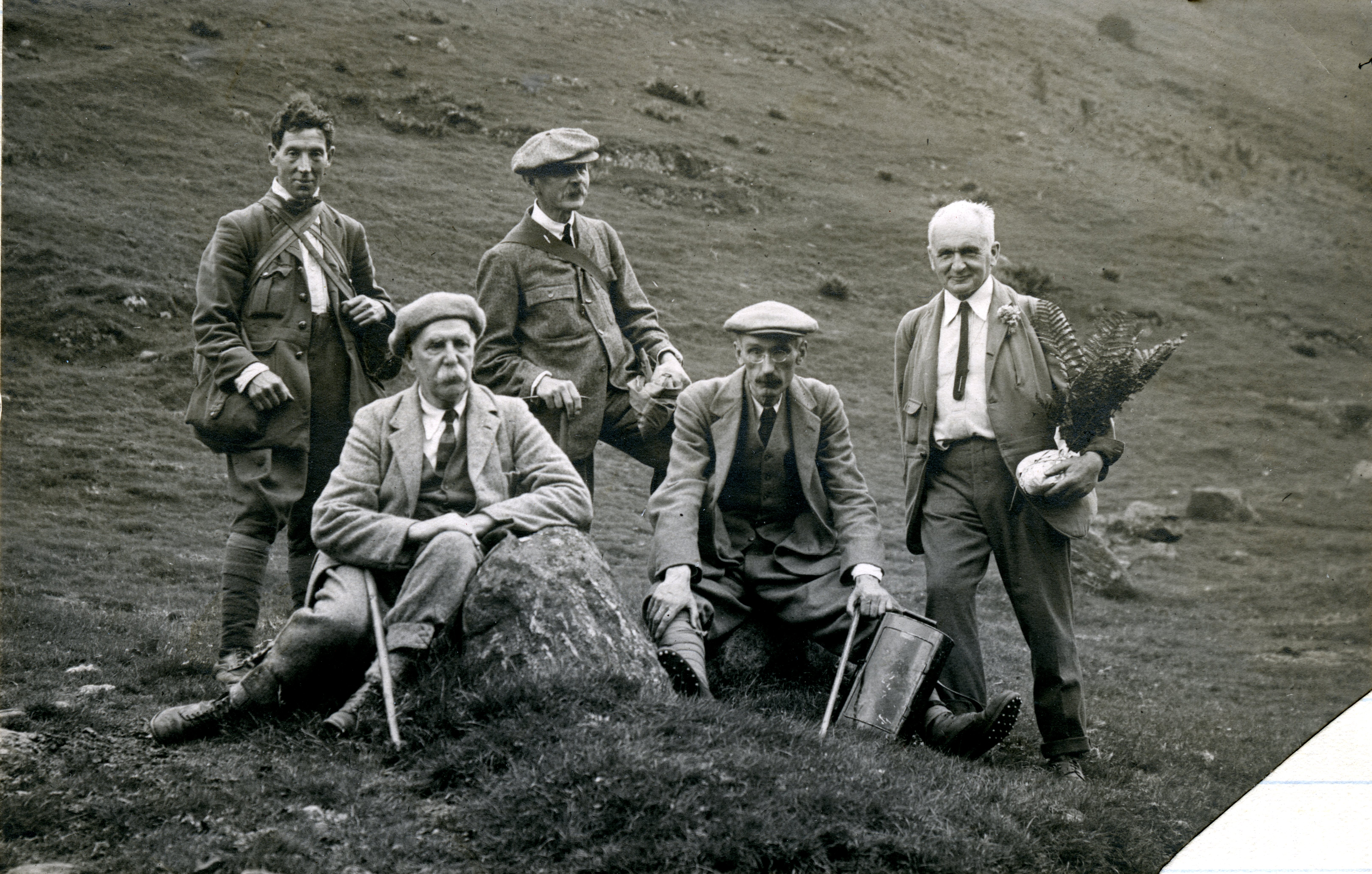
Robert Moyes Adam (left) on a Scottish Alpine Botanical Society expedition c. 1929 with Regius keeper William Wright Smith. (2nd from right).

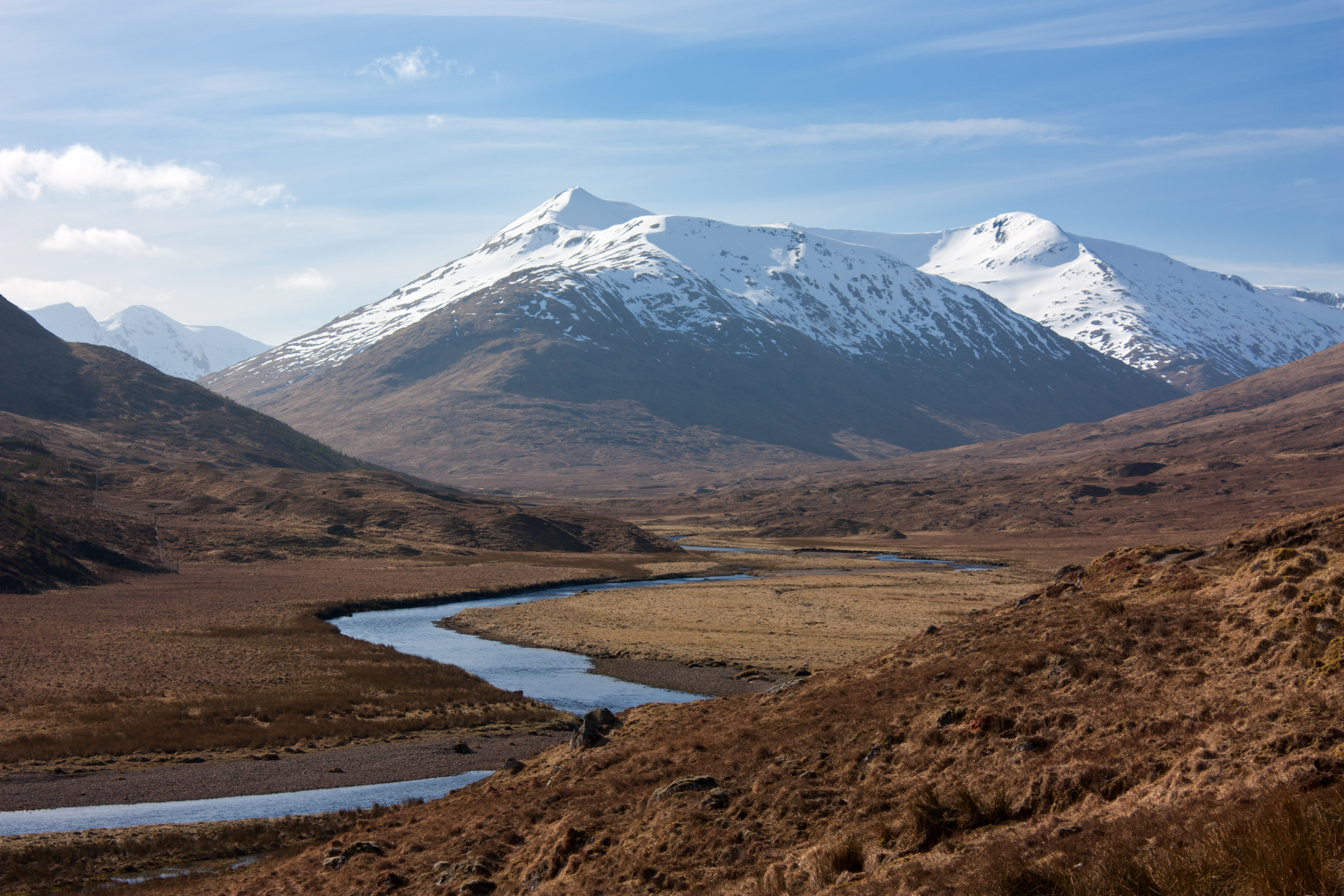
Beinn Fhada and Glen Affric

Adam began work at the Royal Botanic Garden Edinburgh in 1903 where one of his early jobs was to prepare illustrations for lectures by Isaac Bayley Balfour. He studied botany at the University of Edinburgh and became a permanent employee of the botanic gardens in 1914 as assistant in charge of the studio. He was promoted to botanist in 1915, a grade he held until the end of his career.

During the First World War he served in the Royal Garrison Artillery as a gunner and later as a photographer in the Royal Flying Corps. His older brother was killed during the war.

He was official artist to the Botanical Society of Edinburgh and secretary of its offshoot, the Scottish Alpine Botanical Society which combined botany with mountain climbing. In 1929, he campaigned to protect Glen Affric from damage by a proposed hydro-electric scheme by photographing the natural beauty of the area and sending the prints to the newspapers and each Scottish member of Parliament. His work resulted in significant changes to the proposals.

He photographed the botanic gardens and provided photographic illustrations for books, articles and calendars. His work covered botany, landscapes, and the people and life of the Highlands. In 1905, he was one of the last people to photograph the island of Mingulay before it was abandoned. His work appeared in Picture Post, The Scots Magazine, and The Scotsman. He provided the photographs for Hugh Quigley's The Highlands of Scotland (1936) in The Face of Britain series, and F. Fraser Darling's Crofting Agriculture – Its Practice in the West Highlands and Islands (1945).

Throughout his career he used almost exclusively the same half-plate camera that he acquired in 1908. Using 6 1/2 × 4 3/4 inch glass plates and mounted on a wooden tripod, the whole weighed around 30 lbs. The weight of the camera, the inflexibility of the system, and Adam's naturally meticulous nature, meant that photographs had to be planned a long time in advance, leaving little room for spontaneity or improvisation. But it also produced highly distinctive images that had a high depth of field due to the camera's small aperture. He developed all his prints himself, not even letting assistants at the gardens learn his methods.

== Later life and legacy ==
In 1949, Adam retired and left Edinburgh for Kingussie, taking 14,000 of his negatives with him through a blizzard. In 1956, he suffered a heart attack while at Glenfinnan and subsequently moved back to Edinburgh. In 1958 he sold his personal collection of plates and prints to D. C. Thomson, publishers of The Scots Magazine, from where they entered the collection of the University of St Andrews library in 1987. He died in an Edinburgh hospital on 13 November 1967.
