= Vaughan Berry =

British financier and military administrator

- Born: Henry Vaughan Berry; 28 March 1891; Madras, British Raj, India
- Died: 27 February 1979 (aged 87); Bath, Somerset
- Education: Gonville and Caius College, Cambridge
- Spouses: Dorothy Loveday (m. 1921; died 1959) Joan Ogilvie Kirke (m. 1960)

Sir Henry Vaughan Berry (28 March 1891 – 27 February 1979) was a British financier, intelligence officer and military administrator, noted for his close association with senior figures in the Labour Party prior to World War II and for his role afterwards as Regional Commissioner of Hamburg in British-occupied Germany.

== Background and early career ==
Vaughan Berry was born in India in 1891, the son of a banker based in Madras (now Chennai). His paternal family originated from Melksham, Wiltshire, and he spent part of his childhood in nearby Bath, Somerset. He was educated at the City of London School, where he was head boy, and in 1909 won a Daily Mail scholarship which allowed him to live for a year abroad in Germany and Paris. Upon his return to Britain he won a further scholarship to read French and German at Gonville and Caius College, Cambridge, graduating in 1913 with a second class in the medieval and modern languages tripos.

On coming down from Cambridge, Berry obtained a commission in the Royal Army Service Corps. During World War I, he spent two years with the Somerset Light Infantry before being transferred to the Intelligence Corps, and was wounded in France shortly before the war's end in 1918. Following a chance encounter with his college tutor, from 1919 to 1925 he was on the staff of the Inter-Allied Rhineland High Commission, which had been established by the Treaty of Versailles to oversee the occupation of the Rhineland. During his service in the commission he held the temporary rank of captain, reaching the regular rank of lieutenant in 1922. His experiences as a District Officer for the village of Benrath, near Düsseldorf, led him to sympathise with the Germans rather than with the French, and to foresee that the penury and hunger he witnessed could become a breeding ground for xenophobic, nationalist politics.

After re-entering civilian life, Berry became a manager and later a director of the Union Discount Company Ltd., a joint-stock discount house with offices at Cornhill in the City of London. There he maintained the habits of an archetypal "City gent," walking to work every day wearing a top hat. When he took early retirement from the company in December 1945, The Times reported that the news was met with "regret in discount market circles... his wide knowledge had brought him many friendships."

== The XYZ Club ==
Although his career as a City financier was reasonably successful, Berry arguably made a greater impact in politics. Unusually for a man of his education and background, he joined the Labour Party in the aftermath of World War I. However, as the world lurched into economic depression in the early 1930s, he became increasingly dissatisfied with the orthodox economic policy being pursued by Labour Prime Minister Ramsay MacDonald and Chancellor of the Exchequer Philip Snowden. In January 1932, believing the party to be "woefully short on expert knowledge of the City's financial institutions", Berry launched the XYZ Club, a discussion group (Note: Also described as a "study group" (by Roy Hattersley), a "small dining circle" (by John Campbell) and a "quasi-conspiratorial group of City experts" (by Andrew Thorpe). See Roy Hattersley, Choose Freedom : the Future for Democratic Socialism (London: M. Joseph, 1987), p. 212; John Campbell, Roy Jenkins: an Autobiography (London: Weidenfeld and Nicolson, 1983), p. 57; Andrew Thorpe, A History of the British Labour Party, 2nd edition (Basingstoke: Palgrave, 2001), p. 74.) devoted to supplying an "intelligence service on City activities" that would shape the party's economic doctrines. (Note: Brian Brivati argues that Berry founded the Club on his own initiative. Ben Pimlott, on the other hand, suggests that the New Statesman columnist Nicholas Davenport was also involved from the beginning, while Noel Thompson adds the name of Cecil Spriggs, then City Editor of the Manchester Guardian. See Brian Brivati, Hugh Gaitskell (London: Richard Cohen Books, 1996), p. 32; Ben Pimlott, Labour and the Left in the 1930s (Cambridge: Cambridge University Press, 1977), p. 37; Noel W. Thompson, Political Economy and the Labour Party: the Economics of Democratic Socialism, 1884-1995 (London: UCL Press, 1996), p. 87.) As he later recalled:

I invited a few men to dinner to discuss the possibility of forming a small group which would meet regularly to discuss financial problems from a socialist point of view, and be ready to offer its help to the Labour Party... I had been horrified by the Labour Party's ignorance of the city machinery and their complete lack of contacts with the banking world. I felt that something must be done to break this apartheid.

The name ‘XYZ Club’ was adopted to “preserve anonymity” in an environment hostile to socialist values. Although its membership was never large – initial meetings were held in a room above a pub – the Club hosted a number of eminent Labour politicians and supporters: original patrons included the senior parliamentary figures Hugh Dalton and Frederick Pethick-Lawrence, the stockbroker C. F. Chance, financial journalist Francis Williams, and George Strauss of Strauss & Co., metal merchants. They were joined in 1934 by several ambitious young socialist intellectuals, most notably Hugh Gaitskell (a future leader of the party), Douglas Jay and Evan Durbin, who were at the forefront of attempts by Labour's "revisionist" social-democratic wing to introduce Keynesian economic thinking to the party. The Club's influence steadily grew throughout the 1930s and early 1940s, and when Labour was returned to power in 1945 its members advised Dalton during his time as Chancellor, providing assistance in the implementation of the Treasury's economic proposals (such as the bill that nationalised the Bank of England in 1946, which Gaitskell's biographer Philip Williams alleges was drafted on the Club's premises).

== Regional Commissioner of Hamburg, 1946–49 ==
During World War II, Berry was appointed chairman of the Southern Region Manpower Board. This experience, although relatively short in duration, proved an invaluable introduction to the demands of wartime administration. Following his retirement from the Union Discount Company in 1945, he hoped to be made a director of the Bank of England; instead, he was recruited by the Attlee Government to become one of the four new heads of the Regional Commissions it had established to govern the British occupation zone in Germany prior to returning it to fully democratic control. Berry insisted that such an opportunity had come about purely by chance: bumping into the secretary of the Labour Party, Morgan Phillips, following a meeting of the XYZ Club in Westminster, he was first offered the governorship of an unidentified "small colony" and then, when he demurred, was asked by Phillips if he would "like to be a Commissioner in Germany?"

Assigned in May 1946 to the province of Westphalia, when that small and under-populated region was absorbed into the new state (Land) of North Rhine-Westphalia a few months later Berry was redeployed to Hamburg. He arrived in the city at a time of great crisis: there had already been widespread protest at the continuing military requisitioning of houses in the area, and the oncoming winter was to be the worst in living memory. Although eager, above all else, to keep order and represent British interests, Berry was also anxious to develop good relations with the citizenry. The municipal elections in October 1946 were, in this respect, rather fortuitous, for they resulted in a victory for the Social Democratic Party (SPD), thereby allowing Berry to work closely with the city's new reformist mayor (burgomaster), Max Brauer, and assist his administration in bequeathing to post-war Hamburg what they viewed as the complementary political traditions of liberal democracy and moderate socialism.

Although not always successful in conquering the afflictions of a city ravaged by warfare, Berry navigated his way through many of the problems he faced and was by most accounts a highly popular "Gouverneur". Patricia Meehan described the nature of his appeal thus:

His performance in his post was impressive. Publicly loyal to British policy, when he disagreed with it he would challenge the authorities in forthright terms. He was much respected by the Germans for his capability, common sense, compassion and absolute integrity.

The Hamburg newspaper Die Zeit, in an encomium following Berry's departure from the city in 1949, demonstrated this respect when it described him as "an Englishman who embodies all the proverbial but not always encountered characteristics of his compatriots: fairness, humour, simplicity, objectivity and prudence". A similar assessment was made years later by the future West German Chancellor Helmut Schmidt, who had as a student once been invited by Berry to attend an informal discussion on economics at the latter's home. Confessing to a youthful "attachment to Britain" in a 1983 article for The Times, Schmidt recalled that it was his

... experience in postwar Hamburg under British occupation that confirmed my childhood impressions. A distinguished military governor, Sir Henry Vaughan Berry, did much to introduce young Hamburg politicians into the British tradition of democracy, fairness and pragmatism.

In 1949, Berry was made an honorary senator of the University of Hamburg, where an academic prize still exists in his name. That same year, he was knighted in the King's Birthday Honours for "services as Regional Commissioner, Hansestadt Hamburg, Control Commission for Germany, British Element". He was also a founding member of the Anglo-German Club in Hamburg, and was the Club's first chairman.

== Later years ==
Back in England, Berry was the British delegate to the International Authority for the Ruhr, and became a full-time member of the Iron and Steel Corporation of Great Britain for three years. In retirement, he frequently wrote letters to The Times, where he expressed his long-standing aversion to currency speculation, his objection to criticisms of the Labour Party made by the apostate former MP Ronald Chamberlain, and his solutions to the problems of Northern Ireland in the wake of The Troubles.

With his first wife, Dorothy Loveday, Berry had two sons, both of whom died at the end of World War II. Dorothy herself died in 1959, and in the following year Berry remarried, to Joan Ogilvie Kirke. Having lived for some years in Aylesbury, Buckinghamshire, he returned latterly to Bath. There he died in February 1979, to be commemorated in a Die Welt obituary as the man who had led Hamburg "safely through the ravages of the post-war period". One of those who paid his respects was Helmut Schmidt, who rang James Callaghan, then the Prime Minister, to ensure that his condolences were passed on to Berry's widow. Lady Berry died in Bath on 20 May 1980.
