= Daniel Nicol Dunlop =

Scottish entrepreneur

Daniel Nicol Dunlop (28 December 1868, Kilmarnock, Scotland – 30 May 1935, London) was a Scottish entrepreneur, founder of the World Power Conference and other associations, and a theosophist-turned-anthroposophist. He was the father of artist Ronald Ossory Dunlop.

== Life and work ==
=== Childhood, education, marriage and children ===
Dunlop was born on 28 December 1868 in Kilmarnock as the only child of Alexander Dunlop and Catherine Nicol (1847–1873). His father was an architect and a Quaker preacher. He lost his mother at the age of five and was brought up by his grandfather on the Isle of Arran, where he learnt the trade of fishing. After his grandfather died in turn, he returned to his father in Kilmarnock once again, attending the local school. On completing his schooling, he did an apprenticeship with an engineering company in Ardrossan, Ayrshire in western Scotland.

After some differences of opinion with his father, he left home in 1886, taking a job in a bicycle shop in Glasgow. He moved to Dublin 1889, working for a tea and wine merchant, where he befriended the poets Æ (George William Russell) and William Butler Yeats, and became active in the Irish Theosophical Society. He was also known to James Joyce, who mentioned him in Ulysses.

In 1891 he married Eleanor Fitzpatrick (c. 1867–1932); becoming the father of three children, Ronald Ossory Dunlop, a well-known painter, and daughters Edith, the mother of the sociologist Michael Young, Baron Young of Dartington, and Aileen.

=== In business ===
Dunlop moved to America, and in 1896 was employed by the American Westinghouse Electric Company, becoming later assistant manager, and then manager of its European Publicity Department. In 1899 he returned to Britain with his family in this capacity. In 1911, with Sebastian Ziani de Ferranti and others, Dunlop helped to found the British Electrical and Allied Manufacturers' Association (BEAMA) in London, which still exists today. While Ferranti became its first chairman (to 1913) Dunlop was at first its secretary and later its director. A year or two after World War I, Dunlop began to organise the World Power Conference, the precursor to the World Energy Council, which met for the first time on 11 July 1924 and of which he was elected chairman. Towards the close of his life he was elected independent chairman of the Electrical Fair Trading Council and chairman of the executive council of the World Power Conference. He was appointed an Officer of the Order of the British Empire (OBE) in the 1928 Birthday Honours.

=== His work for Theosophy ===
Shortly after leaving home for Glasgow in 1886, Dunlop began to study works on occultism and philosophy. This was greatly stimulated by his friendship with Æ and led to their lifelong connection. After moving to Dublin, he became a member of the local lodge of the Theosophical Society. Together with Æ and Yeats he attended meetings of the Hermetic Society and in 1892 founded the magazine "The Irish Theosophist", which he edited until his departure from Dublin in 1897 for the United States.

When the Theosophical Society split in 1895, Dunlop became a member of the Theosophical Society in America, where he at intervals functioned as secretary to its president, Katherine Tingley, At the end of 1899 he resigned from the Theosophical Society in America, or was perhaps, expelled, the documentation being unclear on this point, and joined the Theosophical Society Adyar in London. He published many articles in the "Theosophical Review" and "The Vahan". In 1909 he initiated the Summer Schools, regular international meetings with theosophical lecture cycles and events where participants got to know one another more intimately. In 1910 he founded the Blavatsky Institute in Manchester in the same year, together with Charles Lazenby, the magazine "the Path". He also founded his own theosophical lodge under the auspices of the Theosophical Society with the name "Light on the Path" and became its president.

=== Meeting with Anthroposophy ===
Dunlop saw Rudolf Steiner for the first time while the latter was still General Secretary of the German Section of the Theosophical Society. He did not, however, join the Anthroposophical Society until 1920, at which time he called into being the anthroposophical "Human Freedom Group", which he led. Here once again, he introduced the idea of, this time, anthroposophical Summer Schools that were realised in 1923 and again in 1924. After personally meeting with Rudolf Steiner, both of them expressed their intimate spiritual connection and respect for one another. In 1928 he organised the first and only World Conference on Anthroposophy and in 1929 he was elected General Secretary of the Anthroposophical Society in Great Britain. He was on terms of intimate friendship with Eleanor Merry (1873–1956), who supported his work, especially after the death of his own wife, Eleanor in 1932. As a result of conflicts and power struggles within the General Anthroposophical Society, leading to its splintering in April 1935, Dunlop was expelled together with a number of other leading members. He died shortly afterwards of an appendicitis. Dunlop enlisted the help of fellow anthroposophist Walter Johannes Stein in the hope of founding a World Economic Organisation, but his death prevented this.

== Selected published work ==
- Protean Man, London 1912
- Symbols of Magic, London 1915
- Studies in the Philosophy of Lorenz Oken. London 1916
- Duty, London 1919
- The Path of Knowledge, London 1920
- Nature-Spirits and the Spirits of the Elements, London 1920

== Literature ==
- Thomas Meyer: D. N. Dunlop, A Man of Our Time. Temple Lodge Publishing (1 October 1996) ISBN 978-0904693386
- Eleanor C. Merry: Erinnerungen an Rudolf Steiner und D. N. Dunlop. Perseus, Basel 1992, ISBN 3-907564-11-1
