= Ronald Ossory Dunlop =

Irish writer and painter

- Born: 28 June 1894; Dublin, Ireland
- Died: 18 May 1973 (aged 78); Chichester, Sussex, England
- Education: Manchester School of Art; Wimbledon College of Art
- Occupations: Author; painter

Ronald Ossory Dunlop RA (28 June 1894 – 18 May 1973) was an Irish writer and painter in oil of landscapes, seascapes, figure studies, portraits and still life.

== Life and career ==
Dunlop was born in Dublin, Ireland, to a Scottish-Irish Anthroposophical-Quaker family. His mother painted in watercolour. He studied at Manchester School of Art, at Wimbledon College of Art and in Paris, having spent some time working in an advertising agency. He became a prolific exhibitor, venues including the Royal Academy, the New English Art Club, Leicester and Redfern Galleries, the Royal Society of Arts, the Royal Hibernian Academy and the Royal Glasgow Institute of the Fine Arts. In 1916 he was granted exemption from military service as a conscientious objector, and worked on the land in the General Service section of the Friends' Ambulance Unit.

His first one-man show (1928) was at the Redfern Gallery in Cork Street, London. In 1923 he had founded the Emotionist Group of writers and artists, and his own work is characterised by a painterly exuberance. He joined The London Group of artists in 1931. Dunlop's work is in a number of public galleries, including the Tate.

Most of his life was spent in England, latterly at Barnham, West Sussex, close to Chichester. He achieved fame in his lifetime, having been elected a full member of the Royal Academy in 1950, and his work is quite distinctive. In the decades after his death, it has been noted that counterfeits of his work have appeared on the market.

Alex Fraser of Vancouver was Dunlop's dealer in London and again later in Canada once Fraser had emigrated in the 1940s.

Dunlop's mother, Eleanor (née Fitzpatrick) was herself a watercolour artist. His father Daniel Nicol Dunlop (1868–1935), was a great friend of W. B. Yeats, James Stephens and George Russell (Æ). Yeats, Russell, and Daniel Nicol Dunlop had together published The Irish Theosophist from the home of Eleanor's father, the Shakespearean scholar R. H. Fitzpatrick.

Thus, Dunlop grew up surrounded by the seminal figures of the Irish Literary Renaissance, in an atmosphere smacking of mysticism and Spiritualism. The Dunlop family moved to New York in 1899, then London three years later. From here, they made the annual pilgrimage back to Dublin during Horse Show week, with Dunlop's father returning to London clutching two or three more 'Æ' canvasses each time. Dunlop trained in art in London, associating with a group of young artists who exhibited at the Hurricane Lamp Gallery in Chelsea. In 1928 the group published a journal called Emotionism: Dunlop supplied a rather vague manifesto ("Art is the expression of the essence of life"), a poem, and an illustration of one of his paintings, "The Fish Market". Dunlop soon expanded his exhibiting circle, showing with the New English Art Club and later with the Royal Academy and the Royal Society of British Artists. He maintained his Irish connections, returning periodically to paint in Dublin and submitting a number of works to the RHA in the 1940s and 1950s.

Frances Spalding described Dunlop as an 'alla prima' painter of traditional subjects. At some stage he settled in Barnham, West Sussex, and in 1947 or 1948 exhibited at Bognor Regis, which led to a connection with Bibby (see below).

He generally signed his work "Dunlop" and his correspondence "R O Dunlop", and as a result his given names were not widely known.

Dunlop's paintings can be seen at the Crawford Gallery in Cork, at the Tate Gallery in London, at the Cheltenham Art Gallery & Museum and the National Portrait Gallery, London.

== Books ==
In addition to painting, Dunlop was a prolific author; his books include:

- Modern Still Life Painting in Oil (London, 1938)
- Understanding Pictures (London, 1948)
- Painting for Pleasure (London, 1951)
- Sketching for Pleasure (London, 1952)
- How to Paint for Pleasure (New York, 1953)
- Ancient Arundel (London, 1953)
- Landscape Painting: Ma Yuan to Picasso (London, 1954)
- Struggling with Paint: Some Reminiscences (London, 1956, autobiography)
