= Eleanor Merry =

British Anthroposophist

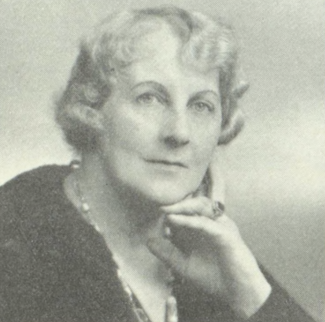
- Born: 17 December 1873; Eton, Berkshire
- Died: 16 June 1956 (aged 82); Frinton-on-Sea
- Occupation: Anthroposophist

Eleanor Merry (17 December 1873 – 16 June 1956) was an English poet, artist, musician and anthroposophist interested in esotericism. She studied in Vienna and met Rudolf Steiner in 1922 after becoming interested in his teachings. She later organized Summer Schools at which Steiner gave lectures, and was secretary for the World Conference on Spiritual Science in London in 1928.

== Biography ==
=== Early years and marriage ===
Her father was a classical scholar and professor of Ancient Greek, Herbert Snow aka Kynaston. She began to attend school at the age of 13.

She married a surgeon, Merry, and they had a son and daughter. In 1922 her husband died of pneumonia.

She was present at the founding of the new General Anthroposophical Society at the Goetheanum in Dornach, Switzerland at New Year 1923/24. It is likely that the theme of the ensuing Summer School at Torquay in 1924, "True and False Paths in Spiritual Investigation" (GA 243) stemmed from a conversation she had with Rudolf Steiner on this occasion.

=== Later years ===
In Britain after Rudolf Steiner's death she acted as secretary of the anthroposophical World Conference in London of 1928 which led to the establishing of Biodynamic agriculture in Britain.

She died on 16. June 1956 in Frinton-on-Sea, Essex.

== Publications ==
- Odrun: The Rune of the Depths: Given in Dramatic Pictures (1928), The Orient-Occident Publishing Co.
- Spiritual knowledge: The Reality and its Shadow (1936).
- The Flaming Door: The Mission of the Celtic Folk-soul (1936), Rider & Co.
- Easter: The Legends and the Fact (1938), King.
- The Dream Song of Olaf Asteson (1943).
- I Am: the Ascent of Mankind (1944), Rider & Co.
- Pure Colour (1946) by Maria Schindler and Eleanor C. Merry, New Culture Publications.
- The Year and its Festivals, from the standpoint of natural human thought and experience (1952), Anthroposophical Publishing Co.
- Remembered Gods and Other Poems (1954) Anthroposophical Publishing Co.
- Art: Its Occult Basis and Healing Value (1961) New Knowledge Books.
- A Man a Maiden and a Tree, A Christmas Mystery-Play Founded on the Medieval English Mystery-Cycles (1986), Eleanor Merry with Isabel Wyatt, The Michael Press.
