= Origin Housing =

UK housing association

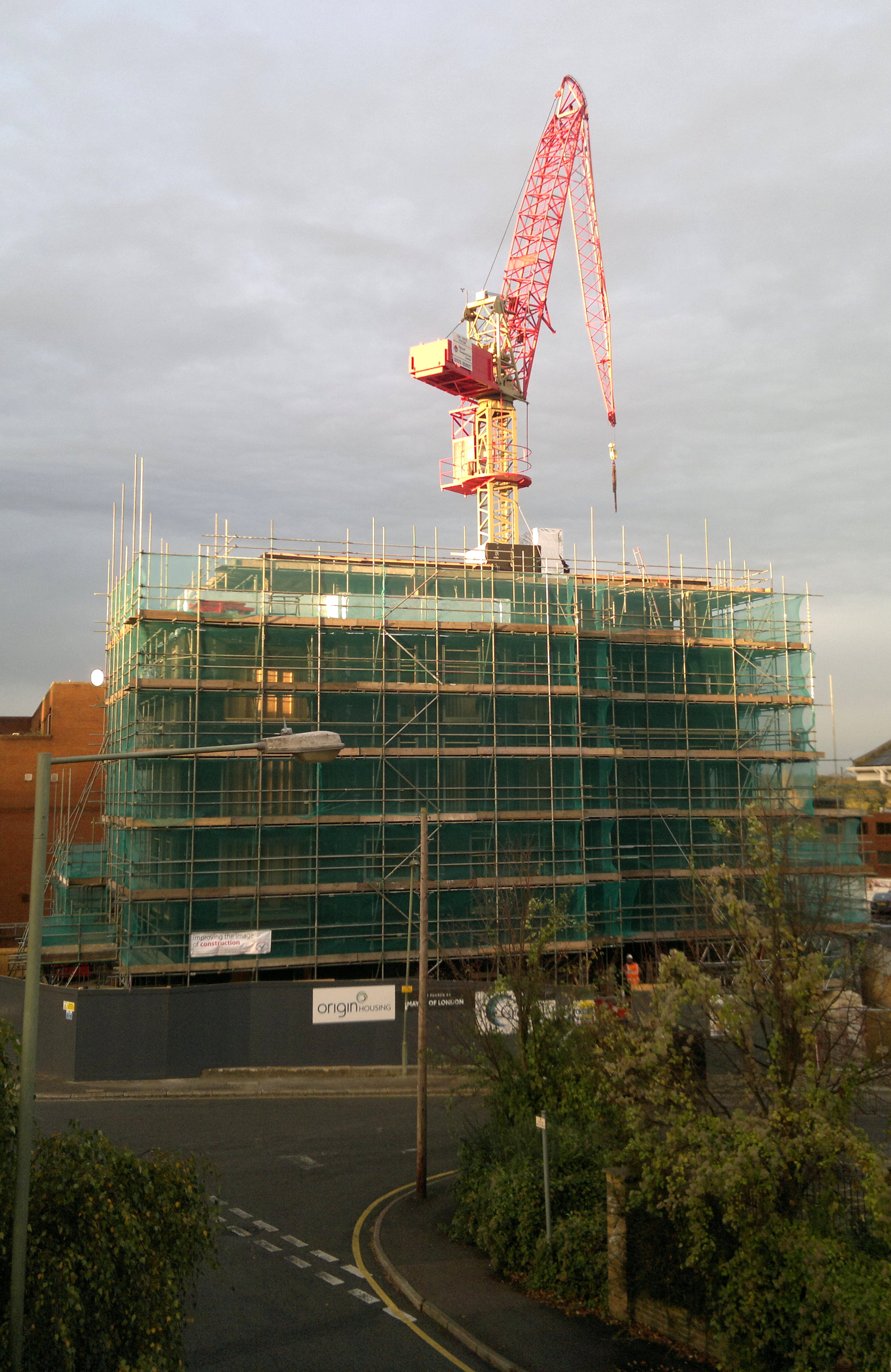
A newbuild Origin Housing project on site in New Barnet

Origin Housing was a housing association operating in London and Hertfordshire in the United Kingdom. Origin Housing owned and managed over 7,000 homes and has a turnover of approximately £57.9 million.

The current structure was formed in 2010 following the merger of Origin Group (Origin Housing Group Ltd.), SPH Housing (St. Pancras & Humanist Housing Association Ltd.,) and Griffin Homes (the Griffin Housing Association).

The St. Pancras Housing Association, the longest established of the antecedents of Origin, was founded in 1923 by Fr. Basil Jellicoe. It was managed for many years by Irene Barclay, the first woman in the British Isles to qualify as a chartered surveyor. St Pancras merged with Humanist Housing Association (originally established by the British Humanist Association) to form St Pancras and Humanist Housing association. Over the years a number of smaller housing bodies have merged into Origin, including Stevenage Housing Association, Greenwoods Almshouses Trust and St Pancras Home Ownership.

In December 2023 the Regulator of Social Housing found serious failings in Governance and Viability at Origin Housing, awarding non-compliant grades of G3 and V3 respectively. Among other things the Regulator's determination cited 'inadequate resourcing and data errors in financial reporting to the board'.

In April 2024 Origin Housing announced its rescue by Places For People under which it now operates as a subsidiary company.
