= The Face of Britain (book series) =

Topographical book series

Cover of Lancashire and the Pennines by Frank Singleton. Designed by Brian Cook.

The Face of Britain was a series of topographical books published by B. T. Batsford from the 1930s to the 1950s that has been described as playing a part in the construction of English identity in that period. The series is notable for the covers by Brian Batsford, who worked under the name Brian Cook.

== Volumes ==
This list may be incomplete.

=== England ===
- Chiltern Country by H. J. Massingham (1940)
- Cotswold Country by H. J. Massingham (1941)
- East Anglia: A survey of England's eastern counties, etc. by Doreen Wallace (1939, 2nd 1943)
- English Downland by H. J. Massingham (1936)
- English Lakeland by Doreen Wallace (1940)
- The Home Counties by S. P. B. Mais (1942) (2nd edition 1947)
- The Islands of England: A survey of the islands around England and Wales, and the Channel Islands by J. H. Ingram (1952)
- Lancashire and the Pennines. A survey of Lancashire, and parts of Northumberland, Durham, Cumberland, Westmorland and Yorkshire. by Frank Singleton (1952)
- Lincolnshire and the Fens by M. W. Barley (1952)
- Midland England by W. G. Hoskins (1949)
- North Country by Edmund Vale (1937)
- North Midland Country: A survey of Cheshire, Derbyshire, Leicestershire, Nottinghamshire and Staffordshire by J. H. Ingram (1948)
- Shakespeare's Country by John Russell (1942)
- South-Eastern Survey. A last look round Sussex, Kent and Surrey ... Illustrated from the author's photographs. by Richard Wyndham (1940). Revised as South-East England by Ronald Jessup.
- Wessex: Dorset, Wiltshire, with West Berkshire & East Somerset by Ralph Dutton (1950)
- West Country by C. Henry Warren (1938)

=== Scotland ===
- The Highlands of Scotland by Hugh Quigley, photographs by Robert M. Adam. (1936)
- The Lowlands of Scotland by George Scott-Moncrieff (1939)
- Scottish Border Country: Roxburghshire and parts of Northumberland, Cumberland, Berwickshire, Selkirkshire and Dumfriesshire. by F. R. Banks (1951)

=== Wales ===
- The Face of Wales by Tudor Edwards (1950)
- Welsh Border Country by P. Thoresby Jones (1938)

=== (Northern) Ireland ===
- The Face of Ulster: Antrim, Londonderry, Fermanagh, Tyrone, Armagh, Monaghan, Cavan, Donegal and Down by Denis O`Donoghue Hanna (1952)

The television series "Penelope Keith's Hidden Villages" was based on the book series.

== See also ==
- County Books series
- The Regions of Britain
- The Regional Books
