= World Energy Council =

Think tank

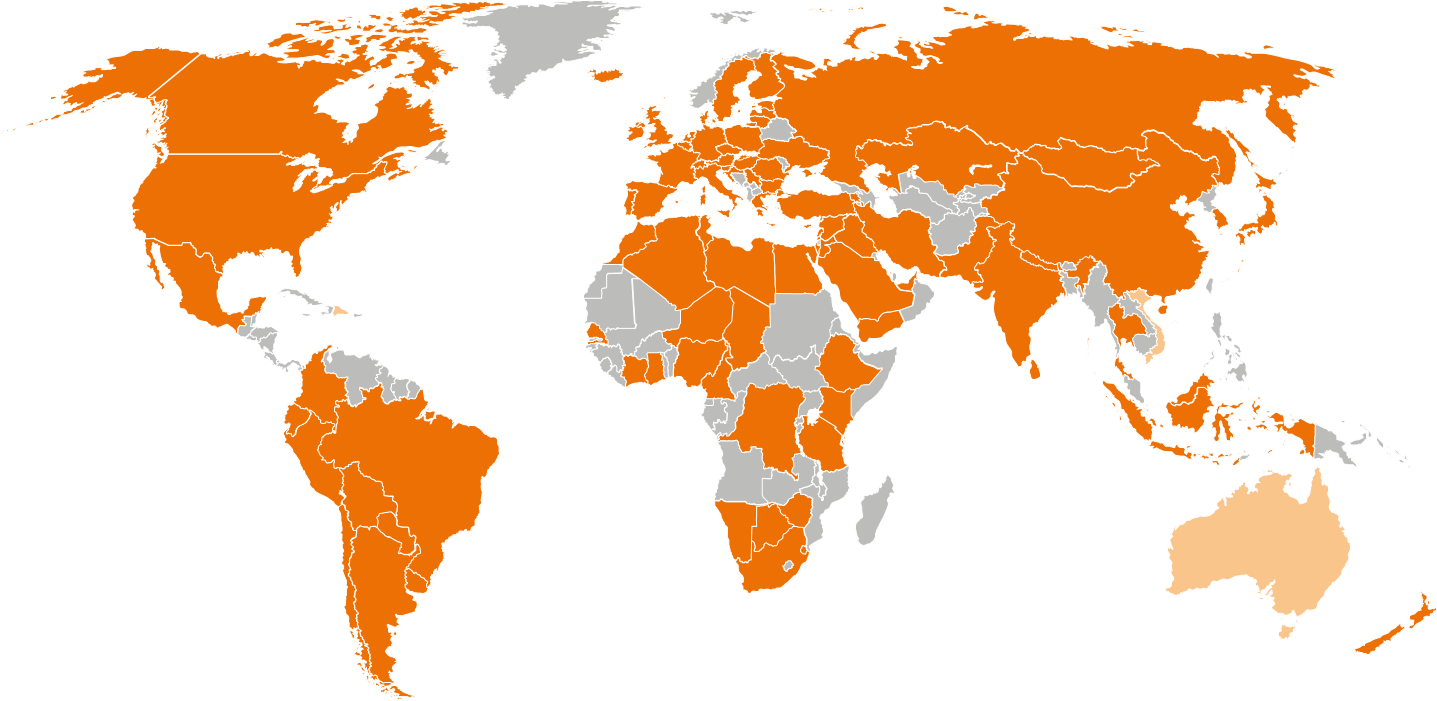
- Formation: 11 July 1924; 102 years ago
- Type: Charity
- Legal status: Foundation
- Purpose: Energy issues
- Headquarters: London, United Kingdom
- Region served: Global
- Members: Member Committees in 92 countries + 2 direct members
- General Secretary: Angela Wilkinson
- Chair: Michael Howard
- Main organ: World Energy Congress
- Affiliations: WEC Foundation; WEC Services Limited
- Website: www.worldenergy.org
- Formerly called: World Power Conference; World Energy Conference

The World Energy Council (WEC) is a global forum for thought-leadership and tangible engagement with headquarters in London. Its mission is 'To promote the sustainable supply and use of energy for the greatest benefit of all people'.

The idea for the foundation of the Council came from Daniel Nicol Dunlop in the 1920s. He wanted to gather experts from all around the world to discuss current and future energy issues. He organised in 1923 first national committees, which organised the first World Power Conference (WPC) in 1924. 1,700 experts from 40 countries met in London to discuss energy issues. The meeting was a success and the participants decided on 11 July 1924 to establish a permanent organisation named World Power Conference. Dunlop was elected as its first Secretary General. In 1968 the name was changed to World Energy Conference, and in 1989 it became the World Energy Council.

The World Energy Council is the principal impartial network of leaders and practitioners promoting an affordable, stable and environmentally sensitive energy system for the greatest benefit of all. Formed in 1923, the Council is the UN-accredited global energy body, representing the entire energy spectrum, with more than 3,000 member organisations located in over 90 countries and drawn from governments, private and state corporations, academia, NGOs and energy-related stakeholders. The World Energy Council informs global, regional and national energy strategies by hosting high-level events, publishing authoritative studies, and working through its extensive member network to facilitate the world’s energy policy dialogue. Today, the Council has Member Committees established in over 90 countries, which represent over 3,000 member organizations including governments, industry and expert institutions. The World Energy Council covers all energy resources and technologies of energy supply and demand.

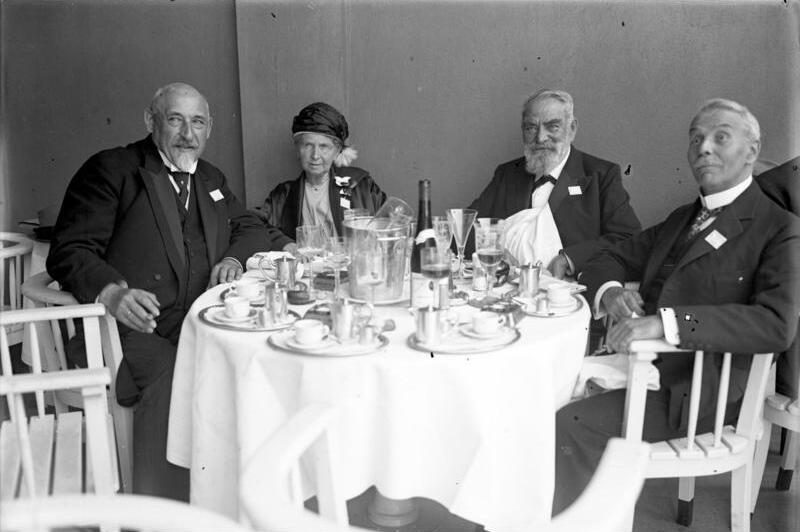
Presidium of the Second World Power Conference in Berlin, 1930 (from right to left): Edouard Tissot, Oskar von Miller and his wife Marie Seitz, Carl Köttgen

The World Energy Council hosts the World Energy Congress, which is the world's largest and most influential energy event covering all aspects of the energy agenda. Staged every three years, the Congress provides a platform for energy leaders and experts in all aspects of the sector to address the challenges and opportunities facing suppliers and consumers of energy. The 2019 edition took place in Abu Dhabi from 9–12 September, where it was announced that Saint Petersburg will be the host city for the next World Energy Congress in 2022.

The World Energy Council's publications include annual releases like the World Energy Trilemma Index, which compares Energy security, equity and environmental sustainability on a country-by-country basis (also available as an online tool), as well as Insights Briefs on current energy topics such as Blockchain.

== Member Committees ==
As of March 2019 the World Energy Council has 87 member committees and 2 countries which have direct membership. Organisations in countries where the World Energy Council does not yet have an active member committee can join the Council under a direct membership.

Caroline Haslett (left) and Gertrude Ruth Ziani de Ferranti of London are the only two women delegates representing organisations at Washington, D.C. on 8 September 1936.

Algeria
Argentina
Armenia
Austria
Bahrain
Belgium
Bolivia
Bosnia
Botswana
Brazil
Bulgaria
Cameroon
Canada
Chad
Chile
China
Colombia
Côte d’Ivoire
Croatia
Cyprus
DR Congo
Dominican Republic
Ecuador
Egypt
Estonia
eSwatini
Ethiopia
Finland
France
Germany
Greece
Hong Kong, China
Hungary
Iceland
India
Indonesia
Iran
Ireland
Italy
Japan
Jordan
Kazakhstan
Kenya
Korea
Latvia
Lebanon
Libya
Lithuania
Malaysia
Malta
Mexico
Monaco
Mongolia
Morocco
Namibia
Nepal
Netherlands
New Zealand
Niger
Nigeria
Pakistan
Panama
Paraguay
Poland
Portugal
Romania
Russian Federation
Saudi Arabia
Senegal
Serbia
Singapore
Slovakia
Slovenia
South Africa
Spain
Sri Lanka
Sweden
Switzerland
Syria
Tanzania
Thailand
Vietnam
Trinidad & Tobago
Tunisia
Turkey
Ukraine
United Arab Emirates
United States
Uruguay

== World Energy Congresses ==
1. London, 1924
2. Berlin, 1930
3. Washington, 1936
4. London, 1950
5. Vienna, 1956
6. Melbourne, 1962
7. Moscow, 1968
8. Bucharest, 1971
9. Detroit, 1974
10. Istanbul, 1977
11. Munich, 1980
12. New Delhi, 1983
13. Cannes, 1986
14. Montreal, 1989
15. Madrid, 1992
16. Tokyo, 1995
17. Houston, 1998
18. Buenos Aires, 2001
19. Sydney, 2004
20. Rome, 2007
21. Montreal, 2010
22. Daegu, 2013
23. Istanbul, 2016
24. Abu Dhabi, 2019
25. Rotterdam, 2024

== Chairs ==
- 1995–1998: John Baker
- 1998–2001: Jim Adam
- 2001–2004: Antonio del Rosario
- 2004–2007: André Caillé
- 2007–2013: Pierre Gadonneix
- 2013–2016: Marie-José Nadeau
- 2016–2019: Younghoon David Kim
- 2019–2022: Jean-Marie Dauger
- 2022–present: Michael Howard

== Secretaries General ==
- 1924–1928: Daniel Nicol Dunlop
- 1928–1966: Charles Gray
- 1966–1986: Eric Ruttley
- 1986–1998: Ian Lindsay
- 1998–2008: Gerald Doucet
- 2008–2009: Kieran O'Brian (acting)
- 2009–2019: Christoph Frei
- 2019–present: Angela Wilkinson

== Officers ==
- MICHAEL HOWARD, Chair
- LEONHARD BIRNBAUM, Chair – Studies Committee
- IBRAHIM AL-MUHANNA, Vice Chair – Special Responsibility Gulf States & Middle East
- MATAR AL NEYADI, Vice Chair – UAE Organizing Committee, World Energy Congress 2019, Abu Dhabi
- KLAUS-DIETER BARBKNECHT, Vice Chair – Finance
- ALEXANDRE PERRA, Vice Chair – Europe
- OLEG BUDARGIN, Vice Chair – Responsibility for Regional Development
- JOSÉ DA COSTA CARVALHO NETO, Chair – Programme Committee
- CLAUDIA CRONENBOLD, Vice Chair – Latin America&Caribbean
- ROBERT HANF, Vice Chair – North America
- ELHAM IBRAHIM, Vice Chair – Africa
- SHIGERU MURAKI, Vice Chair – Asia Pacific & South Asia
- JOSÉ ANTONIO VARGAS LLERAS, Chair – Communications & Strategy Committee
- YOUNGHOON DAVID KIM, Past Chair

== See also ==
- Global warming
- Greenhouse gas
