= XYZ Club =

The XYZ Club was a club established in 1932 by Nicholas Davenport and H. V. Berry to provide financial intelligence to the British Labour Party. The secretary was Hugh Gaitskell. It was credited by Ben Pimlott with being partly responsible for the acceptance by the party of Keynesian economics. To spare embarrassment to its members who worked in the City of London, it met in secret at first, in a room above a pub.

It also drew up plans for the nationalisation of the Bank of England. When a Labour government came to power after the end of the Second World War in 1945, it instituted the Bank of England Act 1946, one of a series of nationalisations undertaken by the post-war government of Clement Attlee.
