= Batsford Books =

British book publisher

- Parent company: Independent
- Founded: 1843
- Founder: Bradley Thomas Batsford
- Country of origin: United Kingdom
- Headquarters location: London, England
- Publication types: Books
- Nonfiction topics: Applied arts, bridge, chess, horticulture, industrial archaeology
- Imprints: Pitkin
- Owner: Polly Powell
- Official website: batsfordbooks.com

Batsford Books is an independent British book publisher.

Batsford was founded in 1843 by Bradley Thomas Batsford. For some time it was an imprint of Pavilion Books. Upon the purchase of Pavilion Books by HarperCollins, on 1 December 2021, B. T. Batsford Ltd once again became an independent publishing house, with Pitkin as an imprint. Polly Powell, former owner of Pavilion Books, became the owner of Batsford Books and John Stachiewicz was appointed chairman.

Harry Batsford, nephew of the founder Bradley Thomas Batsford, was the chairman but also an author for the company writing at least 11 books on English architecture and countryside (some reprinted into the 21st century). Many were co-authored by Charles Fry, Chief Editor and a director of the company. During the Depression years after 1928 there was a period when the firm tried to rely just on their books, illustrated by Batsford's nephew Brian Cook.

A prominent chairman of the firm from 1952 until 1974 was Brian Batsford, known as Brian Cook, who joined in 1928, and designed many of its dust-jackets. Notable series in past years have included The Face of Britain series, The British Heritage Series, The English Life Series, the Batsford Paperbacks series and Batsford's Half-Guinea Library.

Batsford publishes books in various specialty categories such as applied arts, bridge, chess, horticulture and industrial archaeology. Current publications include Millie Marotta's colouring books which have sold in excess of 5 million copies world-wide. Batsford has co-published books with organisations such as the Twentieth Century Society. Under Pavilion, Pitkin Publishing was bought from The History Press in 2017. Pitkin was founded c.1947 and publishes works on English cathedrals and other places of historic and cultural interest.

Batsford organises the Batsford Prize in conjunction with Cassart. The prize is an annual student award open to national and international undergraduate and postgraduate students of fine and applied art, fashion and illustration. There are five categories for entrants: Fine Art, Applied Arts, Fashion, Illustration and Children's Illustration.

In September 2023, it was announced Batsford had acquired the London-headquartered arts publisher Scala Arts & Heritage Publishers and its subsidiary Scala Arts Publishers Inc., for an undisclosed amount.

== Book series ==
- Algebraic Chess Openings
- Batsford Art and Crafts Books
- Batsford Bridge
- Batsford Britain
- Batsford Chess
- Batsford Craft Paperbacks
- Batsford Embroidery Paperbacks
- Batsford Paperbacks
- Batsford's Half-Guinea Library
- Batsford's Walking Guides
- British Battles
- British Cities
- British Heritage
- Buildings of Europe
- Complete Potter
- Contemporary Chess Openings
- Costume in Context
- Countries of Europe
- Discovering Chess
- English Life
- European Life
- Everyday Life
- Everything You Know About...
- The Face of Britain
- A History of Everyday Things in England
- Home Front Handbooks
- Introducing Series
- Learn Quickly
- Millie Marotta
- Past-into-Present
- The Pilgrims Library
- Studies in Cultural History Series
- Then and Now
- Think Like a Chess Master
- Victorian and Edwardian... from Old Photographs
