= The Face of Britain (film) =

1935 documentary by Paul Rotha

- Directed by: Paul Rotha
- Starring: Arthur John Cummings
- Cinematography: George Pocknall; Frank Bundy
- Production company: Gaumont-British Instructional
- Release date: 1935
- Running time: 19 minutes
- Country: United Kingdom
- Language: English

The Face of Britain is a 1935 British short documentary film directed by Paul Rotha for Gaumont-British Instructional. It was sponsored (uncredited) by the Central Electricity Board and included material showing how the newly built National Grid (1928–1933) could play a major role in the necessary reorganisation of British industry.

On its release the film, with accompanying teaching notes, was available for private hire.

== Synopsis ==
The film is in four parts. 1. The Heritage of the Past, showing the unspoilt beauty of the English countryside; 2. The Smoke Age, covering the development of industry, focussing on coal fields; 3. The New Power: electrical schemes in the Highlands of Scotland, including dams and reservoirs; 4. The New Age, arguing that the reliance of the electricity industry on coal can be reduced.

== Cast ==
- Arthur John Cummings as narrator

== Reception ==
The Geography Committee of The Monthly Film Bulletin wrote: "This is a very valuable documentary film, based on the effects of the industrial revolution on the countryside, and possible developments in the future. ... The treatment is impressionistic and stimulating, and the tempo is well adapted to the subjects. The production qualities are excellent, though the use of camera-angles is rather too frequent, and may be confusing to children. The teaching notes are adequate, and provide an excellent bibliography for those who wish to study further the problems raised. Suitability: A background film for Senior, Central and Secondary schools, and a general interest film of particular value to organisations with a civic purpose."

== Home media ==
The film was included on the DVD The Soviet Influence from Turksib to Night Mail (BFI, 2011).
